= List of number-one albums of 2019 (Spain) =

Top 100 España is a record chart published weekly by PROMUSICAE (Productores de Música de España), a non-profit organization composed by Spain and multinational record companies. This association tracks record sales (physical and digital) in Spain.

== Albums ==
Week	Chart date	Album	Artist(s)	Ref
1	January 3	La cruz del mapa	Manuel Carrasco	
2	January 10	La cruz del mapa	Manuel Carrasco	
3	January 17	La cruz del mapa	Manuel Carrasco	
4	January 24	Sinónimo	Rayden	
5	January 31	Sus Canciones	Alba Reche	
6	February 7	Vida	Luis Fonsi	
7	February 14	Héroes en Tiempos de Guerra	David Bustamante	
8	February 21	Extrapolaciones y dos preguntas 1989–2000	Fangoria	
9	February 28	Operación Triunfo 2018: Lo Mejor 2ª Parte	Various artists	
10	March 7	Oh Long Johnson	Miss Caffeina	
11	March 14	Ira Dei	Mägo de Oz	
12	March 21	Rebobinando (25 años)	Camela	
13	March 28	Nuclear	Leiva	
14	April 4	Nuclear	Leiva	
15	April 11	#ElDisco	Alejandro Sanz	
16	April 18	El azogue	Marea	
17	April 25	#ElDisco	Alejandro Sanz	
18	May 2	#ElDisco	Alejandro Sanz	
19	May 9	#ElDisco	Alejandro Sanz	
20	May 16	Ni descanso, ni paz!	La Polla Records	
21	May 23	Akelarre	Lola Indigo	
22	May 30	#ElDisco	Alejandro Sanz	
23	June 6	#ElDisco	Alejandro Sanz	
24	June 13	Spoiler	Aitana	
25	June 20	Western Stars	Bruce Springsteen	
26	June 27	Otras Alas	Natalia Lacunza	
27	July 4	Otras Alas	Natalia Lacunza	
28	July 11	Tour Santa Libertad	Pablo López	
29	July 18	No.6 Collaborations Project	Ed Sheeran	
30	July 25	Spoiler	Aitana	
31	August 1	BTS World: Original Soundtrack	BTS	
32	August 8	BTS World: Original Soundtrack	BTS	
33	August 15	We Are Not Your Kind	Slipknot	
34	August 22	#ElDisco	Alejandro Sanz	
35	August 29	Lover	Taylor Swift	
36	September 5	Emociones	Martina D'Antiochia	
37	September 12	Salto al color	Amaral	
38	September 19	Amuza	Miki Núñez	
39	September 26	Pero No Pasa Nada	Amaia	
40	October 3	Abbey Road: 50 Anniversario	The Beatles	
41	October 10	Per la bona gent	Manel	
42	October 17	Mes excentricités, Vol. 1	Mónica Naranjo	
43	October 24	Fuego	Estopa	
44	October 31	El Danzar de las Mariposas	El Barrio	
45	November 7	El Danzar de las Mariposas	El Barrio	
46	November 14	Antidoto	Antonio José	
47	November 21	Renaissance	Mónica Naranjo	
48	November 28	Le cruz de mapa	Manuel Carrasco	
49	December 5	10:20:40	Melendi	
50	December 12	#ElDisco	Alejandro Sanz	
51	December 19	Tributo a Sabina: Ni tan Joven ni tan Viejo	Various artists	
52	December 26	Tributo a Sabina: Ni tan Joven ni tan Viejo	Various artists	
