= Spain in the Eurovision Song Contest 2019 =

- Eurovision Song Contest 2019
- Participating broadcaster: Radiotelevisión Española (RTVE)
- Country: Spain
- Selection process: Operación Triunfo 2018: Gala Eurovisión
- Selection date: 20 January 2019

Competing entry
- Song: "La venda"
- Artist: Miki
- Songwriters: Adrià Salas

Placement
- Final result: 22nd, 54 points

Participation chronology

Spain was represented at the Eurovision Song Contest 2019 with the song "La venda", written by Adrià Salas and performed by Miki. The Spanish participating broadcaster, Radiotelevisión Española (RTVE), selected its entry through the tenth series of the reality television music competition Operación Triunfo. Ten artists and songs ultimately qualified to compete in the Eurovision selection show of the competition where a public televote exclusively selected "La venda" performed by Miki as the winner, receiving 34% of the votes.

As a member of the "Big Five", Spain automatically qualified to compete in the final of the Eurovision Song Contest. Performing as the closing performance of the show in position 26, Spain placed twenty-second out of the 26 participating countries with 54 points.

== Background ==
Prior to the 2019 contest, Televisión Española (TVE) until 2006, and Radiotelevisión Española (RTVE) since 2007, had participated in the Eurovision Song Contest representing Spain fifty-eight times since TVE's first entry in 1961. They have won the contest on two occasions: in 1968 with the song "La, la, la" performed by Massiel and in 1969 with the song "Vivo cantando" performed by Salomé, the latter having won in a four-way tie with France, the Netherlands, and the United Kingdom. They have also finished second four times, with "En un mundo nuevo" by Karina in 1971, "Eres tú" by Mocedades in 1973, "Su canción" by Betty Missiego in 1979, and "Vuelve conmigo" by Anabel Conde in 1995. In 2018, RTVE placed twenty-third out of twenty-six countries with the song "Tu canción" performed by Amaia and Alfred.

As part of its duties as participating broadcaster, RTVE organises the selection of its entry in the Eurovision Song Contest and broadcasts the event in the country. RTVE confirmed its intentions to participate at the 2017 contest on 14 September 2018. In 2016 and 2017, RTVE organised a national final featuring a competition among several artists and songs to select both the artist and song. In 2018, RTVE used the reality television singing competition Operación Triunfo (the Spanish version of Star Academy) to select both the artist and song that would represent Spain, a procedure which was continued for its 2019 entry after RTVE's Governing Board approved the renewal of the competition for a further series.

== Before Eurovision ==
=== Operación Triunfo 2018 ===
The Spanish entry for the Eurovision Song Contest 2019 was selected through Operación Triunfo, a Spanish reality television music competition consisting of training sixteen contestants in a boarding academy in order to find new singing talent. The tenth series, also known as Operación Triunfo 2018, took place from 19 September 2018 to 19 December 2018 at the Parc Audiovisual de Catalunya in Terrassa (Barcelona), hosted by Roberto Leal. The competition was broadcast on La 1 and TVE International as well as online via RTVE's official website rtve.es. Unlike previous editions, all sixteen contestants that entered the academy were eligible to compete in the Eurovision selection show, Gala Eurovisión, that took place on 20 January 2019. A song submission period for Gala Eurovisión was open from 1 November 2018 until 15 November 2018. In addition to the public call, RTVE and the production company Gestmusic invited established songwriters to submit songs. Songs were required to contain lyrics in one of the official languages of Spain. Songwriters could propose their ideal performer(s) for their songs from among the eligible contestant(s) of Operación Triunfo 2018, but the suggestion was not binding. More than 1,000 songs were received at the conclusion of the submission period, 953 of which were submitted through the public call. Natalia received the highest number of performer proposals from songwriters (266 songs), followed by Alba Reche (217) and Famous (197).

A five-member committee consisting of Zahara (singer and composer), Alberto Jiménez (singer of the band Miss Caffeina), José Juan Santana (member of the Spanish branch of the international OGAE fan club), José Luis Amo (member of the Spanish AEV fan club) and Irene Mahía (representative of RTVE Digital) evaluated the songs received from the public call and selected a maximum of ten songs, while an alternative five-member committee consisting of Ana María Bordas (Co-Head of the Delegation for Spain at Eurovision), Antonio Losada (Co-Head of the Delegation for Spain at Eurovision), Irene Mahía (representative of RTVE Digital), Noemí Galera (director of the Operación Triunfo 2018 academy) and Manu Guix (music director of Operación Triunfo 2018) evaluated the songs received from invited songwriters and also selected a maximum of ten songs. A total of 17 songs were selected for Gala Eurovisión and allocated by the teaching staff of the academy, in collaboration with RTVE, to thirteen of the eligible contestants either as solo acts or in duet combinations. The competing songs and the allocations were announced on 11 December 2018, while one-minute demo versions of the competing songs recorded by the contestants were previewed by RTVE on their official website on 19 December 2018 for an Internet vote.

Contestant was eligible for Gala Eurovisión and was allocated at least one song
Contestant was eligible for Gala Eurovisión but was not allocated any song

Contestant	Age	Residence	Episode of elimination	Place finished (Overall ranking)
Famous	19	Seville	Gala Final	1st
Alba Reche	20	Alicante	Gala Final	2nd
Natalia	19	Pamplona	Gala Final	3rd
Sabela	24	A Coruña	Gala Final	4th
Julia	23	Cádiz	Gala Final	5th
Miki	22	Barcelona	Gala 12	6th
Marta	18	Málaga	Gala 11	7th
María	26	Madrid	Gala 10	8th
Marilia	18	Las Palmas	Gala 9	9th
Carlos Right	25	Barcelona	Gala 8	10th
Noelia	22	Málaga	Gala 7	11th
Damion	21	Tenerife	Gala 6	12th
Dave	20	Cádiz	Gala 5	13th
Joan Garrido	22	Palma	Gala 4	14th
África	22	Madrid	Gala 3	15th
Alfonso	22	Madrid	Gala 2	16th
Rodrigo	25	Huelva	Gala 0	Not selected
Luis	19	Barcelona	Gala 0	Not selected

==== Internet vote ====
Internet users had between 20 December 2018 and 2 January 2019 to vote for their three favourite demos on RTVE's official website. 190,513 votes were received at the conclusion of the voting, and the top three entries qualified for Gala Eurovisión. A five-member committee evaluated the remaining fourteen entries and selected an additional seven qualifiers for Gala Eurovisión.

Internet vote qualifier
Evaluation committee qualifier

Internet vote – 20 December 2018 – 2 January 2019
Artist	Song	Songwriter(s)	Place	Result
Alba Reche	"¿Qué será luego?"	Aitana López	6	—N/a
Carlos Right	"Nunca fui"	Lolo Álvarez	15	—N/a
Carlos Right	"Se te nota"	Juan Pablo Isaza; Juan Pablo Villamil	12	Qualified
Damion	"Sale"	Víctor Arbelo; Adri Mena	13	—N/a
Famous	"No puedo más"	Leroy Sánchez; Louis Biancaniello; Nolan Sipe	4	Qualified
Joan Garrido and Marilia	"A tu lado"	Ángel Reyero; Fernando Fú	16	—N/a
Julia	"¿Qué quieres que haga?"	David Santisteban; India Martínez	11	Qualified
María	"Muérdeme"	Juan Suárez; David Feito; Victoria Riba; Nuria Azzouzi; Rosa Martínez	1	Qualified
Marilia	"Todo bien"	Sananda; Chris Wahle; Andreas Öhrn; Juan Carlos Fuguet López	7	Qualified
Marta	"Vuelve"	Santi Fontclara; Lydia Torrejón	8	—N/a
Miki	"El equilibrio"	Diego Cantero; Sergio Bernal; Tato Latorre; Francesco Severino; Alejandro Martínez	17	—N/a
Miki	"La venda"	Adrià Salas	5	Qualified
Miki and Natalia	"Nadie se salva"	María Peláe; Nil Moliner; Javi Garabatto	9	Qualified
Natalia	"La clave"	Merche; Ander Pérez; Nuria Azzouzi; Rosa Martínez	3	Qualified
Noelia	"Hoy vuelvo a reír otra vez"	Jacobo Calderón; Álex Ubago	2	Qualified
Sabela	"Dímelo de frente"	Raquel del Rosario; David Fernández	14	—N/a
Sabela	"Hoy soñaré"	Jesús Cañadilla; Alejandro de Pinedo	10	Qualified

==== Gala Eurovisión ====
Gala Eurovisión took place on 20 January 2019. The winner, "La venda" performed by Miki, was selected exclusively through a public vote via telephone, SMS and the official Operación Triunfo app.

The four members of the expert panel that commented on the entries were:

- Manuel Martos – musician, music executive, artistic director at Universal Music Spain
- Pastora Soler – singer, represented Spain in 2012
- Tony Aguilar – radio DJ, television presenter, Spanish commentator for the Eurovision Song Contest
- Doron Medalie – Israeli songwriter, composer, artistic director, songwriter of "Toy", the Eurovision winning song for Israel in 2018

In addition to the performances of the competing entries, guest performers included Eleni Foureira, the Eurovision runner-up for Cyprus in 2018, performing "Fuego" and "Tómame". The competing contestants performed "Toy", and Alfred and Amaia who both represented Spain in 2018 were also present to announce the winner. Gala Eurovisión was watched by 1.892 million viewers in Spain with a market share of 11.6%.

Gala Eurovisión – 20 January 2019
R/O	Artist	Song	Televote	Place
1	Marilia	"Todo bien"	6%	6
2	Sabela	"Hoy soñaré"	2%	9
3	Famous	"No puedo más"	5%	7
4	Natalia	"La clave"	6%	5
5	Julia	"Qué quieres que haga"	3%	8
6	Miki	"La venda"	34%	1
7	Noelia	"Hoy vuelvo a reír otra vez"	7%	4
8	Carlos Right	"Se te nota"	1%	10
9	Miki and Natalia	"Nadie se salva"	14%	3
10	María	"Muérdeme"	22%	2

=== Preparation ===
The official video of the song, directed by Adrià Pujol and Fèlix Cortés, was filmed on 13 February 2019 at the Mercantic antique market in Sant Cugat del Vallès (Barcelona) and was released on 7 March 2019.

=== Promotion ===
Miki made appearances across Europe to specifically promote "La venda" as the Spanish Eurovision entry. He performed at the Eurovision in Concert event at the AFAS Live venue in Amsterdam, Netherlands on 6 April; the London Eurovision Party at the Café de Paris venue in London, United Kingdom on 14 April, and the Moscow Eurovision Party at the Vegas City Hall venue in Moscow, Russia on 24 April.

In addition to his international appearances, Miki performed "La venda" as a guest on competitive dance reality television series Fama, a bailar, aired on #0, on 26 March. On 30 March, he performed the song at the Plaza de Oriente in Madrid on occasion of the Earth Hour. On 20 April, he performed during the Eurovision-Spain Pre-Party event which was held at the Sala La Riviera venue in Madrid. On 8 May, the special concert event Miki y amigos, which aired on RTVE's official website and YouTube channel, centered on him, accompanied by guest performers.

== At Eurovision ==
The Eurovision Song Contest 2019 took place at Expo Tel Aviv in Tel Aviv, Israel and consisted of two semi-finals on 14 and 16 May and the final on 18 May 2019. According to Eurovision rules, all nations with the exceptions of the host country and the "Big Five" (France, Germany, Italy, Spain and the United Kingdom) are required to qualify from one of two semi-finals in order to compete for the final; the top ten countries from each semi-final progress to the final. As a member of the "Big Five", Spain automatically qualifies to compete in the final. In addition to their participation in the final, Spain is also required to broadcast and vote in one of the two semi-finals. During the semifinal allocation draw on 28 January 2019, Spain was allocated to air and vote in the first semi-final on 14 May.

In Spain, TVE broadcast both semi-finals on La 2, and the final on La 1 with commentary by Tony Aguilar and Julia Varela; in addition, and for the first time since 2002, Radio Nacional de España (RNE) aired the final on Radio Nacional and Radio 5 with commentary by Daniel Galindo; with all the shows also broadcast internationally on TVE Internacional and the final on Radio Exterior. For the second consecutive year, the final was broadcast live in cinemas across the country due to an agreement with cinema chain Cinesa. RTVE appointed Nieves Álvarez as its spokesperson to announce during the final the top 12-point score awarded by the Spanish jury, for the third year in a row. The Spanish song placed 22nd in the final with 54 points.

=== Staging and performance ===
The staging director for the Spanish performance was Fokas Evangelinos, who had previously worked with the delegations of Greece, Russia, Ukraine, Belarus, and Azerbaijan in a similar role, including the winning performances of Greece in 2005 and Russia in 2008. Miki was joined in stage by backing singers and dancers Mikel Hennet (who represented Spain in 2007 as part of D'Nash), Ernesto Santos, Fran Guerrero, María Acosta and Mary Martínez.

=== Voting ===
Voting during the three shows involved each country awarding two sets of points from 1–8, 10 and 12: one from their professional jury and the other from televoting. Each participating broadcaster assembles a five-member jury panel consisting of music industry professionals who are citizens of the country they represent, with their names published before the contest to ensure transparency. This jury judged each entry based on: vocal capacity; the stage performance; the song's composition and originality; and the overall impression by the act. In addition, no member of a national jury was permitted to be related in any way to any of the competing acts in such a way that they cannot vote impartially and independently. The individual rankings of each jury member, as well as the nation's televoting results, were released shortly after the grand final.

==== Points awarded to Spain ====
Points awarded to Spain (Final)
Score	Televote	Jury
12 points	Portugal	
10 points		
8 points		
7 points	France	
6 points	Belgium	
5 points	Israel; Switzerland	
4 points	Cyprus; Greece	
3 points	Netherlands	
2 points	Azerbaijan; Serbia; United Kingdom	
1 point	Denmark	Russia

==== Points awarded by Spain ====
Points awarded by Spain (Semi-final 1)
Score	Televote	Jury
12 points	Portugal	Australia
10 points	Iceland	Greece
8 points	San Marino	Czech Republic
7 points	Australia	Belarus
6 points	Estonia	Cyprus
5 points	Czech Republic	Belgium
4 points	Belgium	Slovenia
3 points	Slovenia	Serbia
2 points	Greece	Finland
1 point	Cyprus	Estonia

Points awarded by Spain (Final)
Score	Televote	Jury
12 points	Italy	Sweden
10 points	Switzerland	Australia
8 points	Netherlands	Netherlands
7 points	Norway	Azerbaijan
6 points	Sweden	Czech Republic
5 points	Australia	Cyprus
4 points	France	Italy
3 points	Iceland	Switzerland
2 points	Russia	Russia
1 point	Azerbaijan	Slovenia

==== Detailed voting results ====
The following members comprised the Spanish jury:

- María Soledad Giménez Muñoz (Sole Giménez; jury chairperson) – composer, author, singer
- Elena Gómez – radio music coordination at Radio 3
- Ricardo Luis Merino Urdiales (Ricky Merino) – singer, dancer, television host
- Raúl Gómez García (Raúl Gómez) – composer, singer, pianist
- David Feito (singer) – songwriter, producer, represented Spain in 2013 as member of El Sueño de Morfeo

Detailed voting results from Spain (Semi-final 1)
R/O	Country	Jury							Televote	
R/O	Country	S. Giménez	E. Gómez	R. Merino	R. Gómez	D. Feito	Rank	Points	Rank	Points
01	Cyprus	15	2	1	11	5	5	6	10	1
02	Montenegro	5	10	16	17	12	12		17	
03	Finland	13	7	8	13	7	9	2	16	
04	Poland	11	15	10	7	11	13		13	
05	Slovenia	1	12	17	4	9	7	4	8	3
06	Czech Republic	4	9	4	1	3	3	8	6	5
07	Hungary	7	11	9	9	13	11		12	
08	Belarus	12	4	3	3	4	4	7	11	
09	Serbia	6	8	6	12	6	8	3	14	
10	Belgium	3	3	7	6	10	6	5	7	4
11	Georgia	8	16	15	14	17	16		15	
12	Australia	2	6	2	5	1	1	12	4	7
13	Iceland	14	14	12	10	14	15		2	10
14	Estonia	10	5	13	16	8	10	1	5	6
15	Portugal	17	17	11	8	16	14		1	12
16	Greece	9	1	5	2	2	2	10	9	2
17	San Marino	16	13	14	15	15	17		3	8

Detailed voting results from Spain (Final)
R/O	Country	Jury							Televote	
R/O	Country	S. Giménez	E. Gómez	R. Merino	R. Gómez	D. Feito	Rank	Points	Rank	Points
01	Malta	12	17	7	9	23	14		14	
02	Albania	20	19	19	19	25	24		25	
03	Czech Republic	5	21	10	2	4	5	6	13	
04	Germany	7	22	22	17	19	17		20	
05	Russia	15	4	6	16	9	9	2	9	2
06	Denmark	10	23	20	12	14	18		11	
07	San Marino	25	25	25	25	24	25		21	
08	North Macedonia	4	18	15	21	12	12		19	
09	Sweden	2	3	3	4	2	1	12	5	6
10	Slovenia	3	24	23	10	17	10	1	22	
11	Cyprus	23	10	1	13	5	6	5	15	
12	Netherlands	8	2	9	1	3	3	8	3	8
13	Greece	19	13	13	11	20	19		24	
14	Israel	21	15	14	22	15	21		16	
15	Norway	13	11	8	23	6	11		4	7
16	United Kingdom	14	16	21	24	16	22		18	
17	Iceland	24	20	16	15	22	23		8	3
18	Estonia	18	8	24	18	11	16		12	
19	Belarus	22	9	11	8	21	15		17	
20	Azerbaijan	9	1	4	3	10	4	7	10	1
21	France	17	6	12	14	13	13		7	4
22	Italy	6	5	18	5	7	7	4	1	12
23	Serbia	11	14	17	20	18	20		23	
24	Switzerland	16	12	2	7	8	8	3	2	10
25	Australia	1	7	5	6	1	2	10	6	5
26	Spain									
