= The Coffee Table =

- Film poster
- Spanish: La mesita del comedor
- Directed by: Caye Casas
- Written by: Caye Casas; Cris Borobia
- Produced by: Norbert Llaràs; Diego Rodríguez; Mª José Serra
- Starring: Josep Riera; David Pareja; Estefanía de los Santos; Claudia Riera
- Cinematography: Alberto Morago Muñoz
- Edited by: Caye Casas
- Music by: Bambikina
- Production companies: La Charito Films; Alhena Production; Apocalipsis Producciones
- Release dates: 30 November 2022 (PÖFF); 1 December 2023 (Spain)
- Running time: 91 minutes
- Country: Spain
- Language: Spanish

The Coffee Table (Spanish: La mesita del comedor, lit. 'The dining room's small table') is a 2022 Spanish black comedy film directed by Caye Casas and written by Casas and Cristina Borobia. It stars David Pareja and Estefanía de los Santos.

== Plot ==
Jesús Casas and María go to a furniture store with their newborn son Cayetano, nicknamed Cayetanín, to purchase a new coffee table. The salesman, also named Cayetano, offers them an expensive but supposedly high-quality table. María refuses, disbelieving the salesman's promise of unbreakable glass. Jesús complains that María has not allowed him to choose anything throughout their marriage, including their son's name, and purchases the table nonetheless.

Jesús begins building the table in the apartment he inherited from his grandmother. He is visited by his upstairs neighbor, a 13-year-old girl named Ruth who continuously threatens to frame him for pedophilia as he rebuffs her advances. Jesús notices a screw missing from the table and calls Cayetano to request another one; in the meantime, he places the glass pane right-side-up. María leaves to buy groceries and wine in preparation for the visit of Jesús's brother Carlos and his new eighteen-year-old girlfriend Cristina, leaving Jesús alone with Cayetanín for the first time. As Jesús tries to calm an incessantly crying Cayetanín, the glass pane, despite Cayetano's promise, breaks, decapitating Cayetanín and injuring Jesús.

A shell-shocked Jesús begins cleaning up the blood and places Cayetanín's headless body in his crib, but is too scared to pick up the severed head, which is underneath a chair. He borrows bleach from Ruth, who is suspicious. Cayetano arrives at Jesús's apartment door with the missing screw and tries to arrange a date with him. When María returns home, Jesús repeatedly manages to prevent her from entering Cayetanín's room. He eventually tells her that the table's glass pane has broken, amusing her, though he does not admit that Cayetanín has died.

During dinner with Carlos and Cristina, Jesús behaves noticeably erratically and avoids answering questions. Cristina eventually reveals that she is pregnant with a baby girl. Jesús does not react to the news; upon being pressed, he lashes out, asserting that Carlos has ruined Cristina's life by getting her pregnant at such a young age.

Jesús leaves the dining room to record a suicide note for María in the bathroom in which he reveals what happened to Cayetanín. Carlos overhears him, prompting Jesús to bring him into Cayetanín's nursery to show him the corpse. As they prepare to finally tell María the truth, Ruth arrives with her dog and falsely tells María that Jesús kissed her in the elevator. Tensions mount as María continually demands an explanation from Jesús. Ruth's dog then sniffs out Cayetanín's severed head; at the sight of the head, Cristina vomits and Ruth begins hysterically screaming, while Jesús enters a catatonic state. Holding Cayetanín's head in her hands, María opens the door to the balcony.

Some time later, police officers gather outside the apartment discussing a case involving a dead couple and their decapitated baby. Carlos sits in the back of a police car; an officer reports that he is catatonic and has only been able to repeat one phrase – "the coffee table."

== Cast ==
- Estefanía de los Santos as María
- David Pareja as Jesús
- Claudia Riera as Cristina
- Josep Maria Riera as Carlos
- Gala Flores as Ruth
- Eduardo Antuña as vendedor ('salesman')
- Itziar Castro
- Emilio Gavira
- Claudia Font
- Cristina Dilla
- Paco Benjumea

== Production ==
The film was produced by La Charito Films alongside Alhena Production and Apocalipsis Producciones. It was shot in Terrassa. The helmer, Caye Casas, pitched his film as "an uncomfortable, politically incorrect film with extremely black humor and a brutal tragedy". Casas stated while he enjoyed horror films he was not actually scared by the traditional supernatural trappings of the genre and wanted to create a film based on the random cruelty of real life that comes from destiny or bad luck rather than any overtly antagonistic force. With no money or backing, Casas shot the film over the course of ten days at a house a friend let him use.

== Release ==
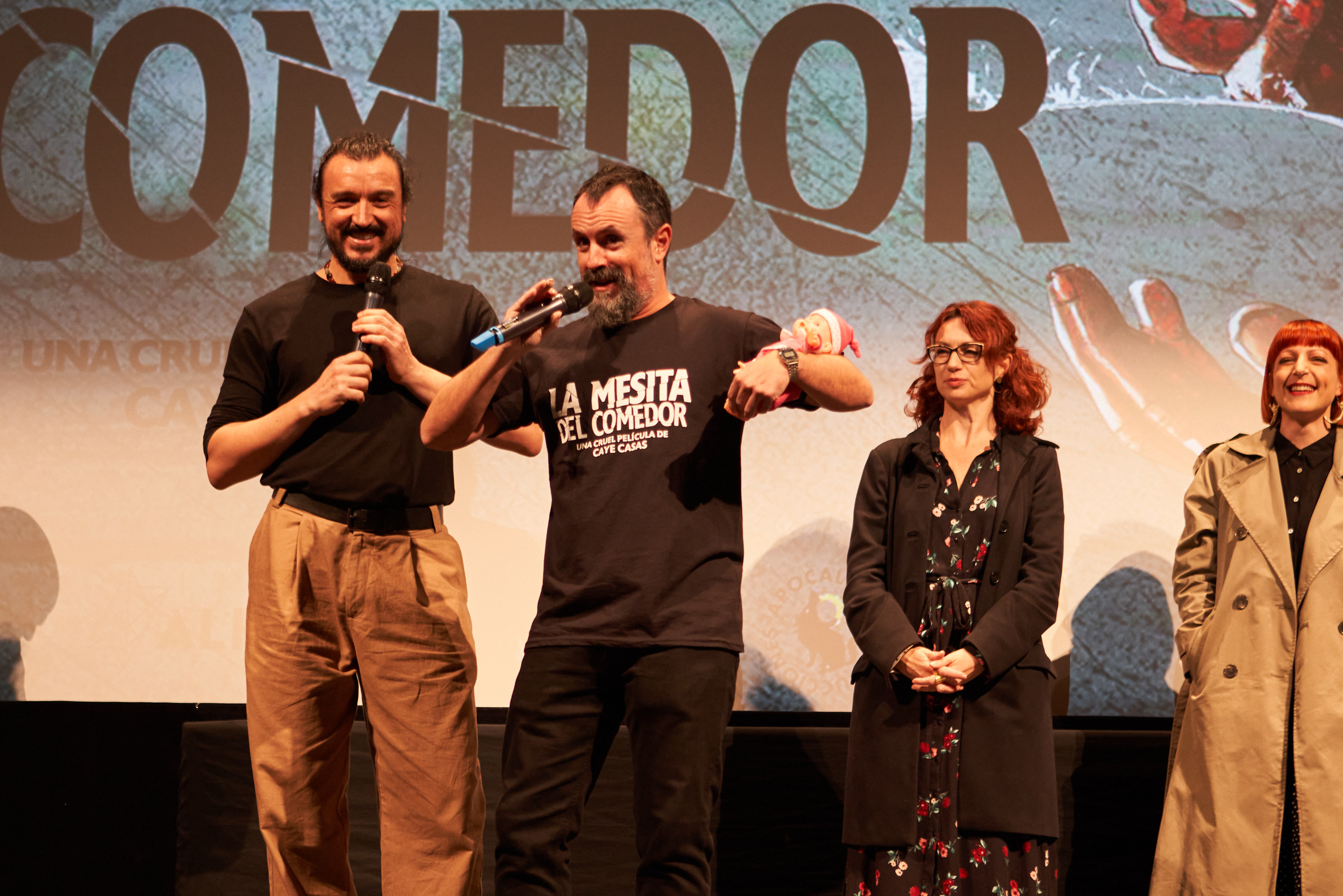
David Pareja and Caye Casas attending a presentation of the film at the San Sebastian Horror and Fantasy Film Festival in 2023

The film was presented in the 'Rebels with a Cause' slate of the 2022 Tallinn Black Nights Film Festival (PÖFF). It also made it to the slate of the 2023 Fantaspoa for its Latin-American premiere, and to the 2023 Fantastic Fest lineup for its North-American premiere. MGM Premium boarded rights to the film. Cinephobia Releasing picked up North American rights to the film. Following the invisible theatrical run in Spain, with the film being self-distributed by Casas in few screens, The Coffee Table earned some buzz in the country after Stephen King recommended the film and Filmin then proceeded to pick up streaming rights.

== Reception ==
According to the review aggregation website Rotten Tomatoes, The Coffee Table has an 89% approval rating based on 37 reviews from critics, with an average rating of 7.8/10. Metacritic, which uses a weighted average, assigned the film a score of 72 out of 100, based on 6 critics, indicating "generally favorable" reviews.

Rafael Motamayor of /Film gave the film a 10 out of 10 rating deeming it to be "one of the bleakest, meanest, most unbearably cruel movies you could ever see".

Stephen King praised the film, describing it as "horrible and also horribly funny. Think the Coen Brothers' darkest dream". Curry Barker cited the movie as one of his favorite films, telling Triple J "it's a horror movie [...] in the human way".

=== Top ten lists ===
The film also appeared on the following top ten list of the best Spanish films of 2023:

- 10th — El Mundo (Luis Martínez)

== Accolades ==
Year	Award	Category	Nominee(s)	Result	Ref.
2023	41st Brussels International Fantastic Film Festival	Best Film ('White Raven' competition)		Won	

== Remake ==
Cam Sehpa, a Turkish remake of The Coffee Table, was reported to have wrapped filming in February 2025.

== See also ==
- List of Spanish films of 2023
