= Me Vale =

Single by Miki Núñez

from the album Iceberg
- Released: May 8, 2020
- Recorded: March 2020
- Length: 3:15
- Label: Universal Music Spain
- Songwriter(s): Diego Arroyo Bretano; Jaime Summers Blanco; Miguel Núñez Pozo
- Producer(s): Paco Salazar

Miki Núñez singles chronology
"Tira de la manta" (2020)	"Me Vale" (2020)	"El Dia de la Victòria" (2020)

"Me Vale" (transl. I Do Not Care) is a song by Spanish singer Miki Núñez. It was released as a single on 8 May 2020 by Universal Music Spain. The song peaked at number 95 on the Spanish Singles Chart. The song was written by Diego Arroyo Bretano, Jaime Summers Blanco and Miguel Núñez Pozo.

== Music video ==
A music video to accompany the release of "Me Vale" was first released onto YouTube on 8 May 2020. Miki Núñez directed the music video during quarantine because of the COVID-19 pandemic. The video centers on himself enjoying life as best as he can in his house, and also features his parents and brother.

== Personnel ==
Credits adapted from Tidal.

- Paco Salazar – producer, bass guitar, guitar, keyboards, programmer, recording arranger, recording engineer, studio personnel
- Diego Arroyo Bretano – composer, lyricist, associated performer, recording arranger
- Jaime Summers Blanco – composer, lyricist, associated performer, guitar, recording arranger
- Miguel Núñez Pozo – composer, lyricist, associated performer, voice
- Paco Salazar – associated performer
- Toni Mateos – associated performer, drums, recording engineer, studio personnel
- Carlos Hernández – mastering engineer, studio personnel
- Felipe Guevara – mixer, studio personnel

== Charts ==
Chart (2020)	Peak position
Spain (PROMUSICAE)	95
