= Alba Reche =

Spanish singer-songwriter

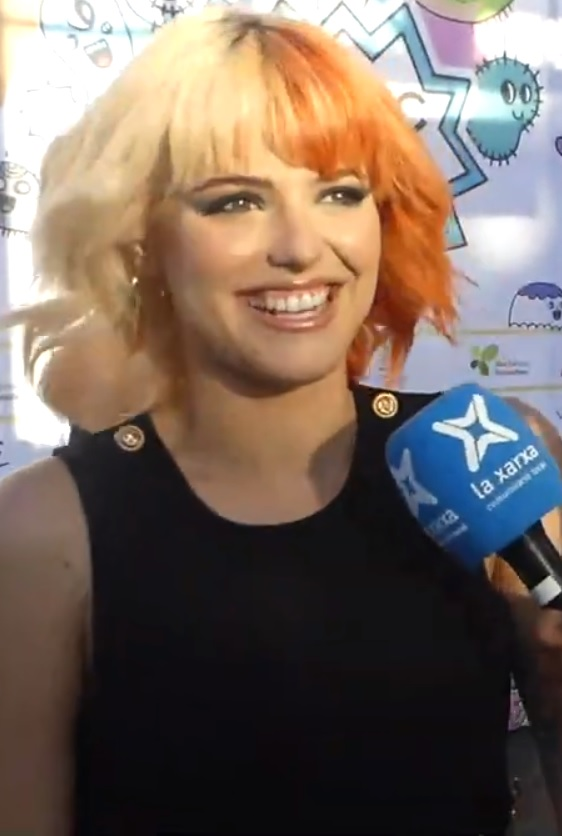
- Reche in 2021
- Born: Alba Martínez Reche; December 17, 1997 (age 28); Elche, Valencian Community, Spain
- Education: Technical University of Valencia
- Occupations: Singer, songwriter
- Years active: 2018–present
- Television: Operación Triunfo
- Height: 160 cm (5 ft 3 in)
- Musical career
- Genres: Synth-pop; pop; Latin R&B
- Label: Universal

Alba Martínez Reche (born 17 December 1997) is a Spanish singer-songwriter from Elche, Alicante. She first gained national recognition in 2018 placing as the runner-up in series ten of the Spanish reality television talent competition Operación Triunfo, behind Famous Oberogo. After exiting the show, Reche signed a record deal with Universal Music and released her debut studio album Quimera (2019) which peaked on the third position on the PROMUSICAE musical chart, sold more than a twenty thousand copies, charted more than thirty weeks and scored a Latin Grammy nomination for Best Engineered Album.

== Early life ==
Reche was born in Elche on December 17, 1997. Daughter of Miguel Ángel Martínez y Rafaela Reche García, she has a little sister named Marina, who is also a singer. Reche started manifesting her passion for music, dancing and, in general, fine arts, at an early age. This led her to enter a dancing academy and to study Fine Arts at the Technical University of Valencia as well. Parallelly, the singer worked as a waitress at a musical pub in Valencia where she used to perform during midnight sessions. In 2018, Reche dropped out of college after being accepted to participate as a contestant on the Spanish musical reality television contest Operación Triunfo.

== Career ==
=== 2018–2019: Operación Triunfo ===
Pushed by her sister, Reche auditioned alongside her relative to take part of the upcoming season of Operación Triunfo. After being selected, she entered the contest in September 2018. Reche was once chosen by the audience as favorite after covering "La Llorona", a traditional Mexican folk song. The performance was critically acclaimed due to its "strength and excellent vocal interpretation". Her performance of Sara Bareilles's "She Used to be Mine" earned her the praise of the singer and a page on The New York Times. After covering "Je Veux" by French singer Zaz, the singer invited the Spanish to perform with her on the show's final gala as well as on her sold-out concert at the WiZink Center in Madrid. In December, the singer was placed second in the show, with the 35% of the popular vote.

Reche was pre-contracted to audition to represent Spain at the 2019 Eurovision Song Contest, with "¿Qué Será Luego?", a track fully written by Aitana López. However, the song didn't make it to the final. In January, Reche topped the PROMUSICAE chart after releasing the compilation album of her performances on Operación Triunfo. Reche co-headlined a 13-date arena concert tour with her fifteen talent show companions in 2019. The tour (named OT 2018 en concierto) began on February 8 at the WiZink Center and ended in Cádiz in August after the last two shows were cancelled due to low ticket sales. Over 120,000 fans attended the tour.

=== 2019–present: Quimera ===
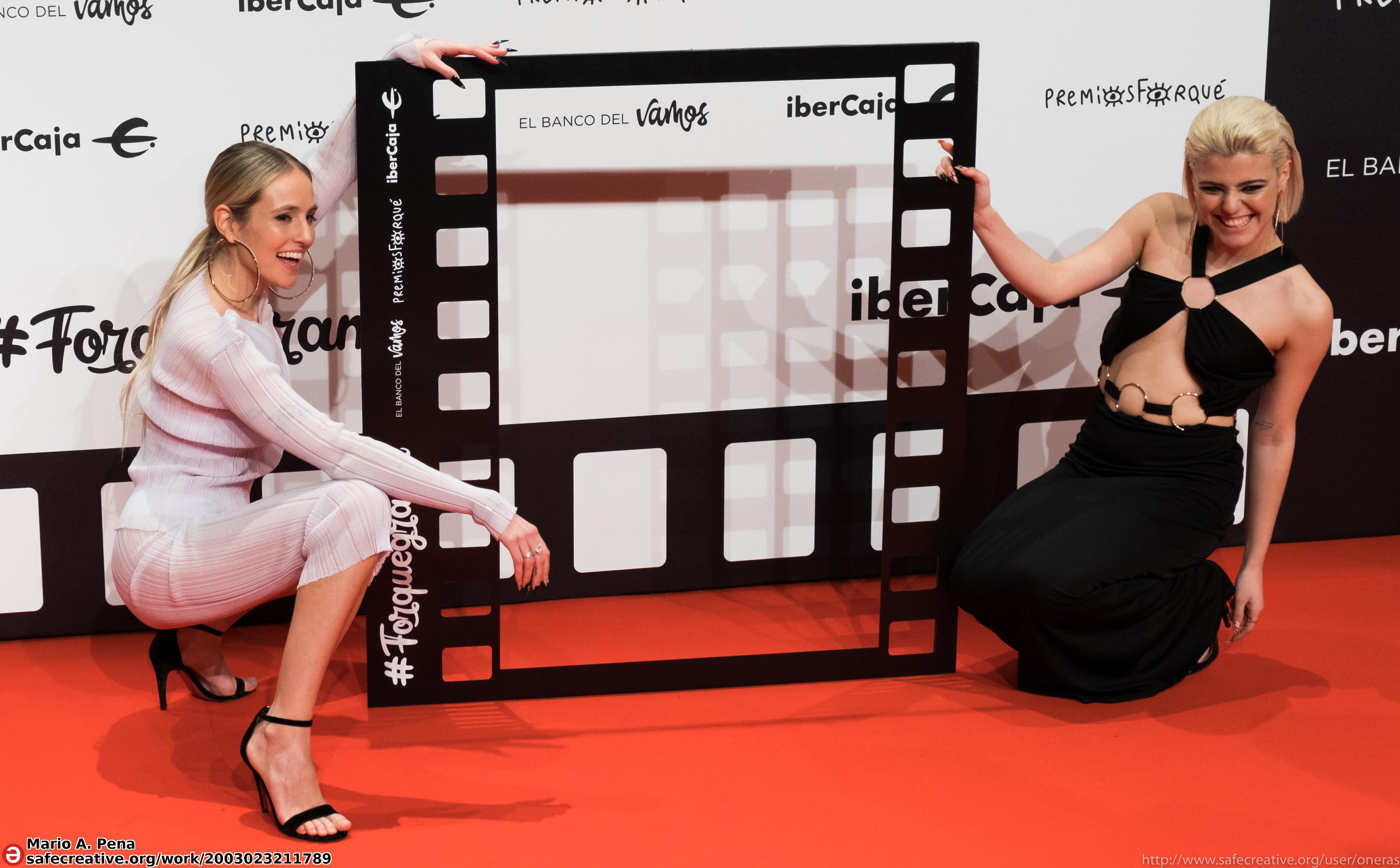
Reche (right) with fellow OT contestant María Villar during the 2019 Forqué Awards

After the talent show ended, Reche signed a record deal with Universal Music. On October 4, 2019, she released "Medusa", the lead single of her debut album after previewing it at the Coca-Cola Music Experience. The track became a top 70 hit in Spain and showcased the new musical direction Reche was taking, a more synth-pop/R&B orientated sound. "Caronte" was released two weeks later as the album's second official single, which peaked on the 68th position on the PROMUSICAE musical chart. On October 25, 2019, her debut album, Quimera, was released on digital download and streaming platforms. The album revolves around Greek mythology stories, while its cover art resembles Eros and Psique. It peaked at number three on the Spanish albums chart. In April 2020, a live acoustic EP titled Sobre Quimera recorded at the Reina Sofía Museum was released on streaming platforms. A week before, a music video for the title track was released on YouTube and began to have radio impact.

In December, the tour that promoted the album, the Quimera Tour, began with two consecutive sold-out shows at the Gran Teatro in Elche. The tour was paused on March 11, 2020 due to concerns over the COVID-19 pandemic in Spain. Many concerts were cancelled or postponed. Alternatively, she embarked on a coronavirus-friendly summer concert tour that respected the social distance dictated by the World Health Organization. During that time, she collaborated with many other artists on the benefit cover song "Escriurem (Jo Em Corono)" (originally sung by Miki Núñez), whose benefits went to Bonaventura Clotet's medical foundation. Previously she had taken part of the "People in Red" gala in Barcelona, which raised 926,000 euros "to invest them in research projects that are being carried out such as the preventive HIV vaccine, but which also helps other diseases such as cancer or Alzheimer's to benefit".

== Personal life ==
Reche currently lives in an apartment in Madrid due to her career. She is bisexual. She was a headliner at the capital's Pride Parade alongside other LGBT artists. She also identifies as a feminist.

As for politics, Reche identifies as left-wing oriented. In November 2019, following a second election within six months in Spain, the singer expressed rejection to the 3,5 million people who had voted for far-right nationalist political party Vox by saying "you guys are not needed" on Twitter. In May 2020 she accused the same party of appropriating the Spanish flag after a big car nationalist protest occurred in a few cities in the country. Reche spoke about the Catalan independence movement with 20 Minutos and stated that "the Government isn't allowing people to express what they believe in". After many protests in Barcelona after the trial of the Catalan independence leaders, the singer tweeted in Valencian "only the people can save the people". In June 2020 she attended the Madrid protest in favor of racial equality and against police brutality and the murder of George Floyd alongside singer and friend Natalia Lacunza.

== Discography ==
Studio albums

- Quimera (2019)
- La Pequeña Semilla (2021)
- No soy tu hombre (2025)

EP

- Sobre Quimera (2020)
- Honestamente Triste (2022)

Singles

- "Medusa" (2019)
- "Caronte" (2019)
- "Quimera" (2020)
- "Que Bailen" (with Cami) (2020)
- "Pido Tregua" (2021)

Guest appearances

- "Moonlight" (2020) (with Cruz Cafuné)
- "Escriurem (Jo Em Corono)" (2020) (with various artists)
- "La Posada (2020)" (with Sebastián Cortés)

== Tour ==
Headlining

- Quimera Tour (2019–20)
- Tour Sobre Quimera (2020)
- No Soy Tu Hombre Tour (2025)

Co-headlining

- OT 2018 en concierto (2019)
