= Celébrate =

Single by Miki Núñez

from the album Amuza
- Released: 28 June 2019
- Recorded: 2019
- Genre: Catalan rumba; Ska
- Length: 3:39
- Label: Universal Music Spain
- Songwriter(s): Miki Núñez; Nil Moliner Abellán
- Producer(s): Roger Rodes

Miki Núñez singles chronology
| "La venda" (2019) | "Celébrate" (2019) | "La Sortida" (2019) |

"Celébrate" (transl. Celebrate yourself) is a song by Spanish singer Miki Núñez. It was released as a single on 28 June 2019 by Universal Music Spain as the first single from Nuñez's debut studio album Amuza, released on 13 September 2019. The song peaked at number 62 on the Spanish Singles Chart. The song was written by Miki Núñez, Nil Moliner Abellán and produced by Roger Rodes.

== Music video ==
A music video to accompany the release of "Celébrate" was first released onto YouTube on 27 June 2019 at a total length of three minutes and forty-one seconds.

== Track listing ==
Digital download
| No. | Title | Length |
|---|---|---|
| 1. | "Celébrate" | 3:39 |

== Charts ==
| Chart (2019) | Peak position |
|---|---|
| Spain (PROMUSICAE) | 62 |
