= Amuza =

Studio album by Miki Núñez
- Released: 13 September 2019
- Recorded: December 2018 – July 2019
- Studio: Medusa Recording (Barcelona, Spain)
- Genre: Folk pop; Catalan rumba
- Length: 41:11
- Language: Spanish; Catalan
- Label: Universal Music Spain
- Producer: Roger Rodés; Oriol Padrós

Miki Núñez chronology
Amuza (2019)	Iceberg (2020)

Singles from Amuza
- 1. "La Venda" Released: 7 March 2019; 2. "Celébrate" Released: 28 June 2019; 3. "Escriurem" Released: 15 September 2019; 4. "Coral del Arrecife" Released: 29 November 2019

Amuza (Esperanto for "fun") is the debut studio album by Spanish singer Miki Núñez. The album was released through Universal Music Spain on 13 September 2019. The 13-track album includes songs in Spanish and Catalan language. The album is produced by Roger Rodés and Oriol Padrós. The album has spawned two singles so far; "La Venda", released as a single on 7 March 2019 and served as the Spanish song for the 2019 Eurovision Song Contest and "Celébrate", which was released on 28 June 2019. The album debuted atop the Spanish PROMUSICAE albums chart.

== Background ==
Miki began composing the album in December 2018 short after leaving the Operación Triunfo musical academy. After performing in Tel Aviv as part of the 2019 Eurovision Song Contest, Núñez stated that "this has only been the beginning. I am composing the album at the moment which I want to be the huge party like "La Venda" is. I am going to be loyal to my thoughts and principles. The festive genre is the one I feel the most comfortable with and I only want the people to go to my concerts to dance and have fun. I also want them to feel like my songs are theirs so we can dance and cry together."

On 24 June 2019 Núñez announced the release date of the album's lead single. "Celébrate" was released four days after the announcement was made. In August 2019 the singer announced on the radio that over 40 songs had been sent to the record label to select from in order to make an LP. Núñez announced the release date of the album on 2 September 2019 through his social media profiles.

The cover art depicts Núñez "connected to different elements of nature, such as branches or stones" by a red thread, a reference to the East Asian concept of the red thread of fate, and is intended to show "that he is attached to his roots". The album has been described as "very personal" and "full of positivism and happiness" by ¡Hola!, with Núñez previously stating that he wanted to make a "happy" record that could "drown [listeners'] sorrows".

== Promotion ==
=== Singles ===
The final version of "La Venda" was released on 7 March 2019 as the lead single from Amuza. The music video, filmed in Barcelona and Sant Cugat del Vallès and directed by Adrià Pujol and Fèlix Cortés, received over a million views in its first 24 hours. The song peaked at 13 on the PROMUSICAE musical chart.

"Celébrate" was released on 28 June 2019 as the album's second single. The song peaked at 62 on the Spanish PROMUSICAE singles chart.

=== Tour ===
The Amuza Tour is set to begin on 25 October 2019 at the Teatro Zentral in Pamplona and is set to conclude on 18 January 2020 in Alicante.

== Track listing ==
No.	Title	Length
1.	"Celébrate"	3:39
2.	"Eterno Verano" (with Adrià Salas and Arnau Griso featuring Nil Moliner)	3:27
3.	"Nadie Se Salva"	2:45
4.	"Vivir al 100%"	2:44
5.	"Per Tu"	2:48
6.	"Coral del Arrecife" (with Sofia Ellar)	3:13
7.	"Apaga la Luz"	2:51
8.	"La Venda"	2:58
9.	"Tanto Tiempo"	3:05
10.	"La Última Palabra"	2:57
11.	"La Cabaña"	3:13
12.	"Escriurem"	3:45
13.	"Y Escribir"	3:46
Total length:		41:11

== Charts ==
=== Weekly charts ===
Weekly chart performance for Amuza
Chart (2019)	Peak position
Spanish Albums (PROMUSICAE)	1

=== Year-end charts ===
Year-end chart performance for Amuza
Chart (2019)	Position
Spanish Albums (PROMUSICAE)	60

== Release history ==
Region	Date	Format(s)	Label
Various	13 September 2019	CD; digital download; streaming	Universal Music
