= The Boarding School: Las Cumbres =

2021 Spanish mystery television series

- Spanish: El Internado: Las Cumbres
- Genre: Mystery; Thriller; Teen drama
- Created by: Laura Belloso; Asier Andueza
- Directed by: Jesús Rodrigo; Carles Torrens; Denis Rovira
- Ending theme: "Corre" by Natalia Lacunza
- Country of origin: Spain
- Original language: Spanish
- No. of seasons: 3
- No. of episodes: 22

Production
- Running time: 50 min (approx.)
- Production companies: Atresmedia Studios; Globomedia

Original release
- Network: Amazon Prime Video
- Release: 19 February 2021 – 7 April 2023

Related
- El Internado

The Boarding School: Las Cumbres (Spanish: El Internado: Las Cumbres) is a Spanish mystery and teen drama-thriller television series, which premiered on Amazon Prime Video on 19 February 2021. Produced by Atresmedia Studios and Globomedia (The Mediapro Studio), it is a reboot of the popular series El Internado, which originally aired from 2007 to 2010.

== Premise ==
The fiction takes place in a boarding school for troubled teenagers located in an ancient monastery isolated from the world in which the students endure strict discipline. Four students (Manuel Villar, Amaia Torres, Paul Uribe, and his sister Adele Uribe) plot to run away from Las Cumbres, a boarding school for "problem children". Adele backs out at the last minute and Paul cannot bring himself to leave his sister behind, so Amaia and Manuel run off into the woods. Manuel stumbles and is knocked out. Amaia watches in disbelief as a dark figure resembling a plague doctor, wearing a crow's mask picks him up and carries him away. When she is caught shortly afterwards by Mara the headmistress and Mario the gym teacher, they dismiss her claims as hysterical nonsense and fantasy. Amaia and Paul, and later their friends, take it upon themselves to find out what happened to Manuel Villar. Their efforts lead to an ancient secret society, La Logia del Nido del Cuervo—the "Raven's Nest" (or "Crow's Nest") Lodge— and to other mysteries at Las Cumbres.

== Cast ==
Key
Main cast (credited)
Recurring cast (3 or more episodes)
Guest cast (1–2 episodes)

Main characters, by credits order of performer
Actor	Character	Seasons		
Actor	Character	1	2	3
Asia Ortega	Amaia Torres	Main	Main	Also starring
Albert Salazar	Paul Uribe	Main	Main	Main
Ramiro Blas	Darío Mendoza	Main	Main	
Joel Bosqued	Álvaro León	Main	Main	Main
Alberto Amarilla	Elías	Main		
Mina El Hammani	Elvira	Main	Main	Main
Claudia Riera	Inés Mendoza Vázquez/Alicia Bernal	Main	Main	Main
Carlos Alcaide	Manuel "Manu" Villar	Main	Main	Main
Paula del Río	Paz Espinosa	Main	Main	
Daniela Rubio	Adele Uribe	Main	Main	Main
Daniel Arias	Eric Guerrero	Main	Main	
Gonzalo Díez	Julio Ramírez	Main	Main	
Natalia Dicenta	Mara	Main	Main	Main
Lucas Velasco	Mario Salazar	Recurring	Recurring	Main
Lydia Pavón	Zoe Cruz			Main
Yon González	Iván Noiret León	Guest		
Blanca Suárez	Julia Medina Jiménez	Guest		

- Carlos Alcaide as Manuel Villar
- Daniela Rubio as Adele Uribe
- Daniel Arias as Eric
- Claudia Riera as Inés/Alicia
- Gonzalo Díez as Julio
- Paula del Río as Paz
- Francisca Aronsson as Rita
- Natalia Dicenta as Mara, director of the boarding school
- Lucas Velasco as Mario, physical education teacher
- Mina El Hammani as Elvira, science teacher
- Joel Bosqued as León, music teacher
- Alberto Amarilla as Elías, monk and Latin teacher
- Kandido Uranga as Arturo, the monastery abbot

Introduced in season 2

- Irene Anula
- Nicolas Cazale
- Annick Weerts
- Alberto Berzal
- Asier Hernández
- Clara Galle

== Episodes ==
=== Series overview ===
Series	Episodes	Originally released	Network
1	8	19 February 2021	Amazon Prime Video
2	8	1 April 2022	Amazon Prime Video
3	6	7 April 2023	Amazon Prime Video

=== Season 1 (2021) ===
No. overall	No. in season	Title	Directed by	Written by	Original release date
1	1	"Episode 1"	Jesús Rodrigo	Story by : Asier Andueza and Laura Belloso; Teleplay by : Laura Belloso	19 February 2021
2	2	"Episode 2"	Jesús Rodrigo	Story by : Asier Andueza, Sara Belloso and Laura Belloso; Teleplay by : Asier Andueza and Laura Belloso	19 February 2021
3	3	"Episode 3"	Carles Torrens	Story by : Verónica Marzá, Asier Andueza, Sara Belloso and Laura Belloso; Teleplay by : Sara Belloso	19 February 2021
4	4	"Episode 4"	Denis Rovira	Story by : Sara Belloso, Abraham Sastre, Asier Andueza and Laura Belloso; Teleplay by : Asier Andueza and Laura Belloso	19 February 2021
5	5	"Episode 5"	Denis Rovira	Abraham Sastre, Sara Belloso, Asier Andueza and Laura Belloso	19 February 2021
6	6	"Episode 6"	Carles Torrens	Story by : Laura Belloso, Asier Andueza, Abraham Sastre and Sara Belloso; Teleplay by : Abraham Sastre and Sara Belloso	19 February 2021
7	7	"Episode 7"	Denis Rovira	Story by : Abraham Sastre, Sara Belloso, Asier Andueza and Laura Belloso; Teleplay by : Laura Belloso and Asier Andueza	19 February 2021
8	8	"Episode 8"	Carles Torrens	Story by : Abraham Sastre, Sara Belloso, Asier Andueza and Laura Belloso; Teleplay by : Laura Belloso and Asier Andueza	19 February 2021

=== Season 2 (2022) ===
No. overall	No. in season	Title	Directed by	Written by	Original release date
9	1	"Episode 1"	Denis Rovira	Laura Belloso, Asier Andueza and Sara Belloso	1 April 2022
10	2	"Episode 2"	Denis Rovira	Sara Belloso, Asier Andueza and Laura Belloso	1 April 2022
11	3	"Episode 3"	Mikel Rueda	Sara Belloso, Arantxa Cuesta and Laura Belloso	1 April 2022
12	4	"Episode 4"	Mikel Rueda	Asier Andueza, Sara Belloso, Eva Mir and Laura Belloso	1 April 2022
13	5	"Episode 5"	Denis Rovira	Story by : Laura Belloso, Eva Mir, Sara Belloso, Asier Andueza and Jesús Mesas Silva; Teleplay by : Sara Belloso and Jesús Mesas Silva	1 April 2022
14	6	"Episode 6"	Mikel Rueda	Story by : Sara Belloso, Eva Mir, Asier Andueza, Jesús Mesas Silva and Laura Belloso; Teleplay by : Asier Andueza and Eva Mir	1 April 2022
15	7	"Episode 7"	Denis Rovira	Story by : Sara Belloso, Jesús Mesas Silva, Asier Andueza, Eva Mir and Laura Belloso; Teleplay by : Sara Belloso and Jesús Mesas Silva	1 April 2022
16	8	"Episode 8"	Mikel Rueda	Story by : Asier Andueza, Eva Mir, Jesús Mesas Silva, Sara Belloso and Laura Belloso; Teleplay by : Asier Andueza, Eva Mir and Laura Belloso	1 April 2022

=== Season 3 (2023) ===
No. overall	No. in season	Title	Directed by	Written by	Original release date
17	1	"Episode 1"	Alexandra Graf	Story by : Asier Andueza, Sara Belloso, Eva Mir, Guillermo Cisneros and Laura Belloso; Teleplay by : Laura Belloso, Asier Andueza and Eva Mir	7 April 2023
18	2	"Episode 2"	Oriol Ferrer	Story by : Sara Belloso, Guillermo Cisneros, Asier Andueza, Eva Mir and Laura Belloso; Teleplay by : Sara Belloso and Guillermo Cisneros	7 April 2023
19	3	"Episode 3"	Alexandra Graf	Story by : Sara Belloso, Guillermo Cisneros, Asier Andueza, Eva Mir and Laura Belloso; Teleplay by : Laura Belloso, Asier Andueza and Eva Mir	7 April 2023
20	4	"Episode 4"	Oriol Ferrer	Story by : Sara Belloso, Guillermo Cisneros, Asier Andueza, Eva Mir and Laura Belloso; Teleplay by : Sara Belloso and Guillermo Cisneros	7 April 2023
21	5	"Episode 5"	Laura Belloso	Asier Andueza, Eva Mir and Laura Belloso	7 April 2023
22	6	"Episode 6"	Oriol Ferrer	Laura Belloso, Guillermo Cisneros and Sara Belloso	7 April 2023

== Production and release ==
Created by Laura Belloso and Asier Andueza and produced by Atresmedia Studios and Globomedia, the series is a reboot of the series El internado, originally aired from 2007 to 2010, and of which Belloso and Andueza were respectively co-creator and screenwriter. Asier Andueza, Laura Belloso, Sara Belloso and Abraham Sastre were charged with writing the screenplay. Denis Rovira, Carles Torrens and Jesús Rodrigo directed the episodes. The rolling credits feature the theme "Corre" performed by Natalia Lacunza. Filming started in Navarre on 3 March 2020. Shooting locations included the Monastery of Irache in Navarre, San Sebastián, Hondarribia, Lazkao, Usurbil, Ergoien, Bilbao, Anglet and sets in the Zinealdea complex in Oiartzun. The first season consisted of 8 episodes with a running time of roughly 50 minutes. On 6 May 2021, cast additions for season 2 were announced. Directed by Denis Rovira and Mikel Rueda, shooting of the 8-episode season had already begun by then.

== Reception ==
Professional ratings
Review scores
Source	Rating
Hobby Consolas	84/100
Noticias	3.5/5 stars

Reviewing for SensaCine before the series' general release, Alicia P. Ferreirós highlighted among the things working well in the first season aspects such as the presentation in the pilot episode, the mythology building, the scare factor and the season finale, while she negatively assessed the late and irregular development of some plots other than the central one as well as the appearance of some expendable secondary characters. Likewise, Mariló Delgado of Hobby Consolas praised the mystery, the well-timed scares and the good performances by the cast members, while mentioning secondary plots having trouble getting started and apparently going nowhere as downside, giving it 84 out of 100. Álvaro Cueva of Milenio considered the series as "all the greatness of El Internado, the original, but with today's editorial and technical possibilities".
