= Claudia Riera =

Andorran actress (born 1995)

- Born: Clàudia Riera i Bertran; 1995 (age 30–31); Andorra
- Education: Institut del Teatre
- Occupation: actor

Claudia Riera or Clàudia Riera i Bertran (born 1995) is an Andorran actress. She has appeared in Catalan plays as well as in cinema and TV series.

== Early life ==
Riera was born in Andorra in 1996. She was trained and educated at the Institut del Teatre in Barcelona. During her studies, Riera opted to follow her talents and focused on theatre plays rather than musicals. One of her offered Riera the role of a robot in a Catalan play titled Alba (or the Garden of Delights) that he was directing. She subsequently decided to professionally pursue a career in acting and took a break from her studies to fully dedicate herself to her role in the play.

== Career ==
Riera's early work involved roles as a hockey player in the TV3 series, which she got through a partnership with her university. The series narrated the story of a struggling women's hockey team that aimed at feminist teenagers and treated contemporary social issues.

Her appearance in the 2020 Catalan film The Offering was described by critics as "magnetic". That same year she worked in the fifth and final season of the TV series Vis a vis.

Riera was cast for the black comedy film The Coffee Table in 2022 portrays one of the main characters. Between 2021 and 2023, she played a main cast role in the 22-episode Amazon TV mystery series The Boarding School: Las Cumbres. The series was shot at a monastery in Navarra and was produced as a reboot from another channel. In 2023, Riera was cast for the TV3 teen drama Jo mai mai, which premiered in January 2024.
