= Operación Triunfo series 10 =

Operación Triunfo
- Series 10
- Hosted by: Roberto Leal
- Judges: Manuel Martos; Joe Pérez-Orive; Ana Torroja
- Winner: Famous Oberogo
- Runner-up: Alba Reche
- Location: Parc Audiovisual de Catalunya, Terrassa, Barcelona

Release
- Original network: La 1
- Original release: 19 September – 19 December 2018

Series chronology
- ← Previous; Series 9 Next → Series 11

The tenth series of Operación Triunfo, also known as Operación Triunfo 2018, began airing on La 1 on 19 September 2018, presented by Roberto Leal.

In addition to the Galas or weekly live shows on La 1, the side show El Chat aired on La 1 after each weekly Gala, hosted by Noemí Galera and Ricky Merino. The activities of the contestants at "The Academy" or La Academia were streamed live via YouTube.

Famous Oberogo was announced the winner on 19 December 2018. Alba Reche came second.

As in the previous season, the series served as the platform to select the Spanish entry at the Eurovision Song Contest 2019. A special live show of Operación Triunfo 2018 was held on 20 January 2019 to select the Spanish entrant and song for Eurovision. Miki Núñez was selected with the song "La venda".

== Headmaster, judges and presenter ==
It was announced that Roberto Leal would continue as host when the series was renewed on 28 February 2018. Noemí Galera confirmed she would continue as the headmaster of the Academy on 13 July 2018. On 23 August 2018, Mónica Naranjo announced that she would be leaving the judging panel; the same day it was confirmed that marketing director Joe Pérez-Orive and music executive and producer Manuel Martos would return as judges. On 10 September 2018, it was announced that singer Ana Torroja would join Pérez-Orive and Martos on the judging panel. As in the previous season, the three regular judges were accompanied every week by a guest panelist from the music industry.

== Auditions ==
Open casting auditions began on 30 May 2018 in Barcelona and concluded on 10 July 2018 in Madrid. The minimum age to audition was 18.

Summary of open auditions
Location	Date(s)	Venue
Barcelona	30 May 2018	Palau Sant Jordi
Alicante	4 June 2018	Port of Alicante
Valencia	7 June 2018	Port of Valencia
Palma	12 June 2018	Palacio de Congresos del Pueblo Español
San Sebastián	18 June 2018	Kursaal Congress Centre and Auditorium
Vigo	21 June 2018	Museo do Mar de Galicia
Santa Cruz de Tenerife	26 June 2018	Auditorio de Tenerife
Málaga	2 July 2018	Fycma
Seville	5 July 2018	Fibes
Madrid	10 July 2018	Technical University of Madrid

A total of 16,769 candidates participated in the open auditions. After the open auditions, 85 candidates were called for the final closed-door auditions that took place from 28 August 2018 to 30 August 2018 in Barcelona. 18 candidates advanced to the introduction live show or "Gala 0".

== Contestants ==
The 18 contestants that appeared on the introduction live show or Gala 0 were announced on 14 September 2018.

Contestant	Age	Residence	Episode of eviction	Place finished
Famous	19	Bormujos	Final Gala	Winner
Alba Reche	21	Elche	Final Gala	Runner-up
Natalia	19	Pamplona	Final Gala	3rd
Sabela	24	As Pontes	Final Gala	4th
Julia	23	San Fernando	Final Gala	5th
Miki	22	Terrassa	Gala 12	6th
Marta	18	Torre del Mar (Vélez-Málaga)	Gala 11	7th
María	26	Madrid	Gala 10	8th
Marilia	18	Gáldar	Gala 9	9th
Carlos Right	25	Esplugues de Llobregat	Gala 8	10th
Noelia	22	Málaga	Gala 7	11th
Damion	21	Adeje	Gala 6	12th
Dave	20	Sanlúcar de Barrameda	Gala 5	13th
Joan Garrido	22	Bunyola	Gala 4	14th
África	22	Madrid	Gala 3	15th
Alfonso	22	Madrid	Gala 2	16th
Rodrigo	25	San Juan del Puerto	Gala 0	Not selected
Luis	19	El Masnou	Gala 0	Not selected

== Galas ==
The Galas or live shows began on 19 September 2018. In the introduction live show or Gala 0, 18 candidates were presented to enter the "Academy." Each contestant performed a cover version of a popular song of their choice, and two of the candidates were eliminated. For the regular galas, the contestants are assigned a popular song to perform in a duet or solo. The audience votes for their favourite performer, and the contestant with the most votes is exempt for nominations. The jury panel comments on the performances and nominates four contestants for elimination. The Academy's staff meeting saves one of the nominees, and the safe contestants save another of the nominees. The two remaining nominees prepare the performance of a song of their choice each for next week's live show, where one of the contestants is saved by the audience via televote, sms and app voting. Each gala features a guest judge and guest performers.

=== Results summary ===
Colour key

–	The contestant was the weekly public's favourite and was exempt for nominations.
–	The contestant was one of the most voted as the public's favourite.
–	The contestant was up for the nomination but was saved by the teachers.
–	The contestant was up for the nomination but was saved by the contestants.
–	The contestant was nominated to leave the academy.
–	The contestant was up for the eviction but was immediately saved by the public votes.

	Gala 0	Gala 1	Gala 2	Gala 3	Gala 4	Gala 5	Gala 6	Gala 7	Gala 8	Gala 9	Gala 10	Gala 11	Gala 12	Final
Famous	Saved	Saved	Saved	Saved	Saved	Saved	Saved	Favourite	Saved	Saved	Saved	Saved; Mark: 8.75	Finalist	Winner
Alba	Saved	Saved	Saved	Saved	Saved	Saved	Favourite	Saved	Saved	Saved	Saved	Nominated; Mark: 9.25	Saved	Runner-up
Natalia	Saved	Saved	Favourite	Saved	Saved	Saved	Saved	Saved	Saved	Saved	Saved	Saved; Mark: 10	Finalist	3rd Place
Sabela	Saved	Nominated	Saved	Saved	Saved	Saved	Saved	Saved	Favourite	Saved	Nominated	Nominated; Mark: 8.25	Saved	4th Place
Julia	Saved	Saved	Saved	Favourite	Saved	Saved	Saved	Saved	Saved	Saved	Saved	Nominated; Mark: 9.25	Saved	5th Place
Miki	Saved	Saved	Saved	Saved	Saved	Favourite	Saved	Saved	Saved	Favourite	Saved	Nominated; Mark: 7.75	Eliminated	
Marta	Saved	Saved	Saved	Saved	Saved	Nominated	Saved	Saved	Nominated	Nominated	Nominated	Eliminated		
María	Saved	Saved	Saved	Saved	Favourite	Saved	Saved	Saved	Saved	Nominated	Eliminated			
Marilia	Saved	Saved	Saved	Saved	Saved	Saved	Nominated	Nominated	Nominated	Eliminated				
Carlos	Saved	Saved	Saved	Saved	Nominated	Saved	Saved	Nominated	Eliminated					
Noelia	Saved	Favourite	Saved	Saved	Saved	Saved	Nominated	Eliminated						
Damion	Saved	Saved	Saved	Nominated	Saved	Nominated	Eliminated							
Dave	Saved	Saved	Nominated	Saved	Nominated	Eliminated								
Joan	Saved	Saved	Saved	Nominated	Eliminated									
África	Saved	Saved	Nominated	Eliminated										
Alfonso	Saved	Nominated	Eliminated											
Rodrigo	Eliminated													
Luis	Eliminated													
Up for elimination	Carlos; Luis; Rodrigo; Sabela	África; Alfonso; Joan; Sabela	África; Dave; Joan; María	Damion; Dave; Joan; Miki	Carlos; Dave; Noelia; Sabela	Carlos; Damion; Marilia; Marta	María; Marilia; Miki; Noelia	Carlos; Julia; Marilia; Miki	Famous; María; Marilia; Marta	Famous; Julia; María; Marta	Alba; Marta; Miki; Sabela	Alba; Famous; Julia; Miki; Sabela	None	Famous; 36% to win (out of 3)
Saved by the teachers	Sabela	África	María	Miki	Noelia	Marilia	Miki	Julia	Famous	Famous	Alba	Famous	None	Famous; 36% to win (out of 3)
Saved by the contestants	None	Joan; 6 of 13 votes to save	Joan; 5* of 12 votes to save	Dave; 5 of 11 votes to save	Sabela; 5 of 10 votes to save	Carlos; 5 of 9 votes to save	María; 3* of 8 votes to save	Miki; 3* of 7 votes to save	María; 4 of 6 votes to save	Julia; 3 of 5 votes to save	Miki; 2 of 4 votes to save	None	None	Alba; 35% to win (out of 3)
Saved by jury	None												Alba; 3 of 3 votes to save	Alba; 35% to win (out of 3)
Saved by public vote	Carlos; 42% to save	None	Sabela; 78.8% to save	Dave; 80% to save	Damion; 65% to save	Carlos; 62% to save	Marta; 59% to save	Marilia; 50.2% to save	Marilia; 57% to save	Marta; 53% to save	Marta; 57% to save	Sabela; 64% to save	Sabela; 43% to save	Natalia; 29% to win (out of 3)
Saved by public vote	Carlos; 42% to save	None	Sabela; 78.8% to save	Dave; 80% to save	Damion; 65% to save	Carlos; 62% to save	Marta; 59% to save	Marilia; 50.2% to save	Marilia; 57% to save	Marta; 53% to save	Marta; 57% to save	Sabela; 64% to save	Julia; 37% to save	Natalia; 29% to win (out of 3)
Evicted	Rodrigo; 37% to save	None	Alfonso; 21.2% to save	África; 20% to save	Joan; 35% to save	Dave; 38% to save	Damion; 41% to save	Noelia; 49.8% to save	Carlos; 43% to save	Marilia; 47% to save	María; 43% to save	Marta; 36% to save	Miki; 20% to save	Sabela; 12% to win (out of 5)
Evicted	Luis; 21% to save	None	Alfonso; 21.2% to save	África; 20% to save	Joan; 35% to save	Dave; 38% to save	Damion; 41% to save	Noelia; 49.8% to save	Carlos; 43% to save	Marilia; 47% to save	María; 43% to save	Marta; 36% to save	Miki; 20% to save	Julia; 10% to win (out of 5)

=== Gala 0 ===
- Musical guests: Contestants from Operación Triunfo 2017 ("Camina")

Gala 0 – 19 September 2018
R/O	Contestant	Song	Result
1	Marilia	"Piel canela"	Saved by the jury
2	Damion	"What Do You Mean?"	Saved by the jury
3	Julia	"Vuelves"	Saved by the jury
4	Famous	"Faith"	Saved by the jury
5	Natalia	"Crazy"	Saved by the jury
6	Rodrigo	"El sitio de mi recreo"	Proposed by the jury Evicted by the public
7	María	"Cry to Me"	Saved by the jury
8	Carlos Right	"Cómo mirarte"	Proposed by the jury Saved by the public
9	Alba Reche	"Dangerous Woman"	Saved by the jury
10	Alfonso	"Pégate"	Saved by the jury
11	Noelia	"River"	Saved by the jury
12	Dave	"Sea"	Saved by the jury
13	Sabela	"Bachata Rosa"	Proposed by the jury Saved by the teachers
14	Miki	"Prefiero"	Saved by the jury
15	Luis	"Carita de buena"	Proposed by the jury Evicted by the public
16	Marta	"Superstar"	Saved by the jury
17	Joan Garrido	"Let's Stay Together"	Saved by the jury
18	África	"Tuyo"	Saved by the jury

=== Gala 1 ===
- Group performance: "This Is Me"
- Musical guests:
  - Malú ("Todos los secretos")
  - Aitana ("Teléfono")
- Guest judge: Tony Aguilar

Gala 1 – 26 September 2018
R/O	Contestant	Song	Result
1	Carlos Right	"El ataque de las chicas cocodrilo"	Saved by the jury
1	Miki	"El ataque de las chicas cocodrilo"	Saved by the jury
2	África	"Perfect"	Proposed by the jury Saved by the teachers
2	Damion	"Perfect"	Saved by the jury
3	Alfonso	"Échame la Culpa"	Proposed by the jury Nominated
3	Sabela	"Échame la Culpa"	Proposed by the jury Nominated
4	Dave	"Alfonsina y el mar"	Saved by the jury
4	Marilia	"Alfonsina y el mar"	Saved by the jury
5	Alba Reche	"Respect"	Saved by the jury
5	Noelia	"Respect"	Public's favourite
6	María	"Ella"	Saved by the jury
6	Marta	"Ella"	Saved by the jury
7	Joan Garrido	"Vuelvo a verte"	Proposed by the jury Saved by the contestants
7	Julia	"Vuelvo a verte"	Saved by the jury
8	Famous	"Feel It Still"	Saved by the jury
8	Natalia	"Feel It Still"	Saved by the jury

=== Gala 2 ===
- Group performance: "Bonito es"
- Musical guests:
  - Lola Indigo ("Ya no quiero ná")
  - Tequila (Greatest Hits' medley)
- Guest judges:
  - Rosana (substituting Ana Torroja)
  - Julia Gómez Cora

Gala 2 – 3 October 2018
R/O	Contestant	Song	Result
Up for eviction
1	Alfonso	"All of Me"	Evicted by the public
2	Sabela	"Benditas feridas"	Saved by the public Saved by the jury
Regular performances
3	Dave	"Volando voy"	Proposed by the jury Nominated
3	Noelia	"Volando voy"	Saved by the jury
4	África	"Friends"	Proposed by the jury Nominated
4	María	"Friends"	Proposed by the jury Saved by the teachers
5	Alba Reche	"Alma mía"	Saved by the jury
5	Miki	"Alma mía"	Saved by the jury
6	Joan Garrido	"Another Day of Sun"	Proposed by the jury Saved by the contestants
6	Marilia	"Another Day of Sun"	Saved by the jury
7	Damion	"Déjala que baile"	Saved by the jury
7	Famous	"Déjala que baile"	Saved by the jury
8	Marta	"Tainted Love"	Saved by the jury
8	Natalia	"Tainted Love"	Public's favourite
9	Carlos Right	"Mi historia entre tus dedos"	Saved by the jury
9	Julia	"Mi historia entre tus dedos"	Saved by the jury

=== Gala 3 ===
- Group performance: "Viva la Vida"
- Musical guest: Blas Cantó ("Él no soy yo")
- Guest judge: Wally López

Gala 3 – 10 October 2018
R/O	Contestant	Song	Result
Up for eviction
1	África	"God Is a Woman"	Evicted by the public
2	Dave	"Rock and roll bumerang"	Saved by the public Proposed by the jury Saved by the contestants
Regular performances
3	Alba Reche	"Just Give Me a Reason"	Saved by the jury
3	Marta	"Just Give Me a Reason"	Saved by the jury
4	Carlos Right	"Contigo"	Saved by the jury
4	María	"Contigo"	Saved by the jury
5	Famous	"What a Fool Believes"	Saved by the jury
5	Noelia	"What a Fool Believes"	Saved by the jury
6	Damion	"Lo siento"	Proposed by the jury Nominated
6	Natalia	"Lo siento"	Saved by the jury
7	Joan Garrido	"Friday I'm in Love"	Proposed by the jury Nominated
7	Miki	"Friday I'm in Love"	Proposed by the jury Saved by the teachers
8	Marilia	"Cómo quieres que te quiera"	Saved by the jury
8	Sabela	"Cómo quieres que te quiera"	Saved by the jury
9	Julia	"Born This Way"	Public's favourite

=== Gala 4 ===
- Group performance: "I Am What I Am"
- Musical guests:
  - Mon Laferte ("Mi buen amor")
  - Álvaro Soler ("La cintura") (with the contestants)
- Guest judge: David Otero

Gala 4 – 17 October 2018
R/O	Contestant	Song	Result
Up for eviction
1	Damion	"Give Me Love"	Saved by the public Saved by the jury
2	Joan Garrido	"Bed I Made"	Evicted by the public
Regular performances
3	Dave	"Vivir"	Proposed by the jury Nominated
3	Julia	"Vivir"	Saved by the jury
4	Marilia	"Lo echamos a suertes"	Saved by the jury
4	Marta	"Lo echamos a suertes"	Saved by the jury
5	Famous	"Take Me to Church"	Saved by the jury
6	María	"Quédate en Madrid"	Public's favourite
6	Miki	"Quédate en Madrid"	Saved by the jury
7	Carlos Right	"Estrella polar"	Proposed by the jury Nominated
7	Sabela	"Estrella polar"	Proposed by the jury Saved by the contestants
8	Noelia	"La tormenta"	Proposed by the jury Saved by the teachers
9	Alba Reche	"Toxic"	Saved by the jury
9	Natalia	"Toxic"	Saved by the jury

=== Gala 5 ===
- Group performance: "Me encanta"
- Musical guests:
  - Vance Joy ("Riptide")
  - Miriam Rodríguez and Pablo López ("No!")
- Guest judge: Javier Llano

Gala 5 – 24 October 2018
R/O	Contestant	Song	Result
Up for eviction
1	Carlos Right	"Tip Toe"	Saved by the public Proposed by the jury Saved by the contestants
2	Dave	"Créeme"	Evicted by the public
Regular performances
3	Alba Reche	"Fast Car"	Saved by the jury
3	Famous	"Fast Car"	Saved by the jury
4	Miki	"El patio"	Public's favourite
5	María	"Ex's & Oh's"	Saved by the jury
5	Noelia	"Ex's & Oh's"	Saved by the jury
6	Marta	"Y nos dieron las diez"	Proposed by the jury Nominated
7	Damion	"Volar"	Proposed by the jury Nominated
7	Sabela	"Volar"	Saved by the jury
8	Julia	"Pienso en tu mirá"	Saved by the jury
8	Natalia	"Pienso en tu mirá"	Saved by the jury
9	Marilia	"Rather Be"	Proposed by the jury Saved by the teachers

=== Gala 6 ===
- Group performance: "Vivir así es morir de amor"
- Musical guest: Tom Walker ("Leave a Light On")
- Guest judge: Carlos Jean

Gala 6 – 31 October 2018
R/O	Contestant	Song	Result
Up for eviction
1	Damion	"God's Plan"	Evicted by the public
2	Marta	"Leave Me Alone"	Saved by the public Saved by the jury
Regular performances
3	Famous	"1, 2, 3"	Saved by the jury
3	María	"1, 2, 3"	Proposed by the jury Saved by the contestants
4	Sabela	"Set Fire to the Rain"	Saved by the jury
5	Carlos Right	"Lucky"	Saved by the jury
5	Marilia	"Lucky"	Proposed by the jury Nominated
6	Alba Reche	"La Llorona"	Public's favourite
7	Julia	"Tú y yo volvemos al amor"	Saved by the jury
7	Noelia	"Tú y yo volvemos al amor"	Proposed by the jury Nominated
8	Miki	"Shallow"	Proposed by the jury Saved by the teachers
8	Natalia	"Shallow"	Saved by the jury

=== Gala 7 ===
- Group performance: "Don't Stop Me Now"
- Musical guests:
  - Eros Ramazzotti ("Hay vida")
  - CNCO ("Llegaste Tú" / "Reggaetón Lento (Bailemos)")
- Guest judge: Brisa Fenoy

Gala 7 – 7 November 2018
R/O	Contestant	Song	Result
Up for eviction
1	Marilia	"María se bebe las calles"	Saved by the public Proposed by the jury Nominated
2	Noelia	"Stone Cold"	Evicted by the public
Regular performances
3	María	"Voy en un coche"	Saved by the jury
4	Famous	"Nobody but You"	Public's favourite
5	Miki	"No olvidarme de olvidar"	Proposed by the jury Saved by the contestants
5	Sabela	"No olvidarme de olvidar"	Saved by the jury
6	Natalia	"Flames"	Saved by the jury
7	Alba Reche	"Contamíname"	Saved by the jury
7	Carlos Right	"Contamíname"	Proposed by the jury Nominated
8	Julia	"Love On Top"	Proposed by the jury Saved by the teachers
8	Marta	"Love On Top"	Saved by the jury

=== Gala 8 ===
- Group performance: "Enamorado de la moda juvenil"
- Musical guests:
  - David Bisbal & Greeicy ("Perdón")
  - James Arthur ("Empty Space")
  - Carlos Baute & Marta Sánchez ("Te sigo pensando")
- Guest judge: Ruth Lorenzo

Gala 8 – 14 November 2018
R/O	Contestant	Song	Result
Up for eviction
1	Carlos Right	"Everything"	Evicted by the public
2	Marilia	"Hasta la Raíz"	Saved by the public Proposed by the jury Nominated
Regular performances
3	Famous	"September"	Proposed by the jury Saved by the teachers
3	Marta	"September"	Proposed by the jury Nominated
4	Natalia	"Aunque no sea conmigo"	Saved by the jury
5	María	"I Want to Hold Your Hand"	Proposed by the jury Saved by the contestants
5	Sabela	"I Want to Hold Your Hand"	Public's favourite
6	Julia	"90 minutos"	Saved by the jury
7	Miki	"Can We Dance"	Saved by the jury
8	Alba Reche	"Je veux"	Saved by the jury

=== Gala 9 ===
- Group performance: "Spice Up Your Life"
- Musical guests:
  - Manuel Carrasco ("Me dijeron de pequeño")
  - Vanesa Martín ("Inventas")
  - C. Tangana & Niño de Elche ("Un veneno")
- Guest judge: Pastora Soler

Gala 9 – 21 November 2018
R/O	Contestant	Song	Result
Up for eviction
1	Marilia	"Only Girl (In the World)"	Evicted by the public
2	Marta	"I Want to Know What Love Is"	Saved by the public Proposed by the jury Nominated
Regular performances
3	Natalia	"Lush Life"	Saved by the jury
4	Miki	"Una lluna a l'aigua"	Public's favourite
5	Julia	"Me Muero"	Proposed by the jury Saved by the contestants
6	María	"Amorfoda"	Proposed by the jury Nominated
7	Alba Reche	"Allí donde solíamos gritar"	Saved by the jury
8	Famous	"El reloj"	Proposed by the jury Saved by the teachers
9	Sabela	"Next to Me"	Saved by the jury

=== Gala 10 ===
From this week, voting for the favourite of the audience was put on hold for the final stretch of the series, and no contestant was exempt from nominations.

- Group performance: "Somos" (all sixteen contestants)
- Musical guests:
  - Ana Belén ("Esta vida es un regalo")
  - Cepeda ("Por ti estaré")
- Guest judge: Paco Tomás

Gala 10 – 28 November 2018
R/O	Contestant	Song	Result
Up for eviction
1	María	"Because the Night"	Evicted by the public
2	Marta	"Like a Prayer"	Saved by the public Proposed by the jury Nominated
Regular performances
3	Sabela	"Te necesito"	Proposed by the jury Nominated
4	Alba Reche	"Lost on You"	Proposed by the jury Saved by the teachers
5	Miki	"Promesas que no valen nada"	Proposed by the jury Saved by the contestants
6	Julia	"A que no me dejas"	Saved by the jury
7	Natalia	"The Scientist"	Saved by the jury
8	Famous	"Uptown Funk"	Saved by the jury

=== Gala 11 ===
This episode determined the first two contestants that qualified for the final. Each of the four members of the jury panel gave marks to the contestants (from 5 to 10). The contestant with the highest score was saved. The Academy's staff saved a second contestant. The four remaining contestants were up for elimination.

- Group performance: "Ni tú ni nadie"
- Musical guests:
  - Alfred García ("De la Tierra hasta Marte")
  - Rosana ("En la memoria de la piel")
- Guest judges:
  - Ana Belén (substituting Ana Torroja)
  - Javier Llano

Gala 11 – 5 December 2018
R/O	Contestant	Song	Result
Up for eviction
1	Marta	"One More Try"	Evicted by the public
2	Sabela	"El cuarto de Tula"	Saved by the public Nominated
Regular performances
3	Famous	"Problem"	Saved by the teachers Finalist
4	Julia	"Sober"	Nominated
5	Miki	"Hijos de la tierra"	Nominated
6	Natalia	"Bang Bang (My Baby Shot Me Down)"	Finalist
7	Alba Reche	"Crazy in Love"	Nominated

Detailed Jury Marks
Contestant	M. Martos	A. Belén	J. Pérez-Orive	J. Llano	Total
Alba Reche	9	10	10	8	37
Famous	9	9	9	8	35
Julia	9	9	10	9	37
Miki	8	8	8	7	31
Natalia	10	10	10	10	40
Sabela	8	9	8	8	33

=== Gala 12 ===
The episode determined the last three contestants that advanced to the final and joined the two contestants who had already qualified the previous week. The judging panel saved one of the four contestants that were up for elimination. The public saved two of the remaining three contestants in a voting window that took place during the live show.

- Group performance: "Human"
- Musical guests:
  - Laura Pausini and Biagio Antonacci ("El valor de seguir adelante")
  - Ana Guerra ("Bajito")

Gala 12 – 12 December 2018
R/O	Contestant	Solo Song	R/O	Trio Song	Result
1	Alba Reche	"She Used To Be Mine"	5	"Este amor ya no se toca"	Saved by the jury Finalist
4	Julia	"Ya lo sabes"	5	"Este amor ya no se toca"	Saved by the public Finalist
7	Natalia	"Seven Nation Army"	5	"Este amor ya no se toca"	Finalist
2	Miki	"Some Nights"	8	"Calypso"	Evicted by the public
3	Sabela	"Negro Caravel"	8	"Calypso"	Saved by the public Finalist
6	Famous	"Sólo tú"	8	"Calypso"	Finalist

=== Final Gala ===
In the final, the winner of the series was decided by public vote. Each finalist performed a popular song of their choice, and after that, the first round of voting ended. The two finalists with the fewest votes were eliminated. A second round of voting began to determine the winner of the series, and the three remaining finalists performed the song they had sung on "Gala 0".

- Group performances:
  - "The Edge of Glory"
  - "Somos" (all sixteen contestants)
- Musical guests:
  - Rozalén and David Otero ("Baile")
  - Pablo Alborán ("Tu refugio")
  - Amaia Romero ("Un nuevo lugar")

Final Gala – 19 December 2018
R/O	Contestant	Final Song	R/O	Gala 0 Song	Result
1	Alba Reche	"Creep"	6	"Dangerous Woman"	Runner-Up
2	Famous	"And I Am Telling You I'm Not Going"	7	"Faith"	Winner
3	Julia	"Déjame ser"	—N/a		5th place
4	Natalia	"Never Enough"	8	"Crazy"	3rd Place
5	Sabela	"Tris Tras"	—N/a		4th place

== Specials ==
=== Christmas Gala ===
A Christmas special aired on La 1, where the five finalists of the tenth series performed one of the songs they had performed during the competition alongside its original artist. The special also focused on the five finalists from the ninth series of Operación Triunfo and the start of their solo careers.

- Group performances (all sixteen contestants):
  - "Somos"
  - "Buenas noches"
- Musical guests:
  - Gisela ("Amigos")
  - Alfred García ("Et vull veure" / "De la Tierra hasta Marte" / "Wonder")
  - Luz Casal ("Miénteme al oído")
  - Aitana ("Vas a quedarte")
  - Amaia Romero ("Perdona (Ahora sí que sí)")
  - Ana Guerra ("Olvídame")

Christmas Gala – 26 December 2018
R/O	Contestant	Guest partner	Song
1	Julia	India Martínez	"90 minutos"
2	Sabela	Rosa Cedrón	"Negro caravel"
3	Natalia	Beret	"Lo siento"
4	Alba Reche	Zaz	"Je veux"
5	Famous	Cesár Sampson	"Nobody but You"

=== Eurovision Gala ===
Nine of the contestants from the series performed ten original songs with the goal of representing Spain at the Eurovision Song Contest 2019. Seventeen candidate songs were assigned to thirteen of the sixteen contestants in solo and duet combinations. An online vote took place from 20 December 2018 to 2 January 2019, and the three songs with the most votes advanced to the special live show "Gala Eurovisión"; an evaluation committee selected seven additional entries from the fourteen remaining songs for the live show. During the live show, the winner was selected by public vote. In case of a tie after the regular window of voting, a second round of voting would have been opened to decide the winner.

- Group performance: "Toy"
- Musical guest: Eleni Foureira ("Fuego" / "Tómame")
- Judges (feedback only):
  - Manuel Martos
  - Pastora Soler
  - Tony Aguilar
  - Doron Medalie

Eurovision Gala – 20 January 2019
R/O	Contestant	Song	Result
1	Marilia	"Todo bien"	6th
2	Sabela	"Hoy soñaré"	9th
3	Famous	"No puedo más"	7th
4	Natalia	"La clave"	5th
5	Julia	"Qué quieres que haga"	8th
6	Miki	"La venda"	1st
7	Noelia	"Hoy vuelvo a reír otra vez"	4th
8	Carlos Right	"Se te nota"	10th
9	Miki & Natalia	"Nadie se salva"	3rd
10	María	"Muérdeme"	2nd

== Tour ==
Following the finale, all 16 contestants reunited for a tour across arenas and stadiums in Spain, performing live. The tour was troubled by low ticket sales in later shows, which resulted in two shows being changed to smaller venues while the final two concerts were cancelled.

Colour key:

- Cancelled tour date

Dates of the Operación Triunfo 2018 tour
Date	Venue
8 February 2019	WiZink Center, Madrid
3 May 2019	Navarra Arena, Pamplona
24 May 2019	Coliseum da Coruña, A Coruña
31 May 2019	Palau Sant Jordi, Barcelona
1 June 2019	Bizkaia Arena, Barakaldo
8 June 2019	Estadio Benito Villamarín, Sevilla
15 June 2019	Palacio de Deportes de Granada, (Note: The Granada concert venue was changed from Plaza de toros de Granada due to low ticket sales.) Granada
22 June 2019	Pabellón de Deportes, (Note: The Palancia concert venue was changed from Nueva Balastera Stadium due to low ticket sales.) Palencia
27 June 2019	Poliesportiu Mateu Cañellas, Inca
29 June 2019	Port of Valencia, Valencia
6 July 2019	Auditorio Municipal Cortijo de Torres, Málaga
21 July 2019	Recinto Gijón Life, Gijón
10 August 2019	Muelle Ciudad del Puerto, Cádiz
~~15 August 2019~~ (Note: The Pineda De Mar concert was cancelled due to low ticket sales.)	~~Festival Arts D'Estiu Espai Marítim, Pineda de Mar~~
~~21 August 2019~~ (Note: The Almería concert was cancelled due to low ticket sales.)	~~Recinto Ferial, Almería~~

== Ratings ==
Operación Triunfo 2018 consolidated viewership and adjusted position Colour key: – Highest rating during the season (nominal) – Lowest rating during the season (nominal)
Episode	Original airdate	Timeslot	Viewers (millions)	Share	Night Rank	Source
"Gala 0"	19 September 2018	Wednesday 10:30 pm	2.32	20.5%	#1	
"Gala 1"	26 September 2018	Wednesday 10:30 pm	2.10	16.6%	#2	
"Gala 2"	3 October 2018	Wednesday 10:30 pm	1.88	15.8%	#2	
"Gala 3"	10 October 2018	Wednesday 10:30 pm	2.03	17.0%	#2	
"Gala 4"	17 October 2018	Wednesday 10:30 pm	1.96	16.9%	#4	
"Gala 5"	24 October 2018	Wednesday 10:30 pm	1.90	15.9%	#4	
"Gala 6"	31 October 2018	Wednesday 10:30 pm	1.74	14.1%	#3	
"Gala 7"	7 November 2018	Wednesday 10:30 pm	1.84	15.3%	#5	
"Gala 8"	14 November 2018	Wednesday 10:30 pm	1.89	15.3%	#3	
"Gala 9"	21 November 2018	Wednesday 10:30 pm	1.93	16.2%	#4	
"Gala 10"	28 November 2018	Wednesday 10:30 pm	1.91	16.0%	#3	
"Gala 11"	5 December 2018	Wednesday 10:30 pm	1.89	15.3%	#3	
"Gala 12"	12 December 2018	Wednesday 10:30 pm	1.78	15.4%	#3	
"Final Gala"	19 December 2018	Wednesday 10:30 pm	2.23	19.4%	#2	
"Christmas Gala"	26 December 2018	Wednesday 10:05 pm	1.79	12.7%	#3	
"Eurovision Gala"	20 January 2019	Sunday 10:05 pm	1.89	11.6%	#3	
