= Seis peniques =

Studio album by Sofia Ellar
- Released: 24 February 2017
- Recorded: 2016–2017
- Length: 40:22
- Language: Spanish; English
- Label: Sofia Ellar S.L

Seis peniques (Six pennies) is the debut album by English singer and songwriter Sofia Ellar. It was released 24 February 2017. The record is a collection of pop and folk she wrote during several years, with themes inspired from her past experiences. The name of the album pays tribute to a former pub in Madrid, Spain.

== Track listing ==
No.	Title	Writer(s)	Length
1.	"El Rayo Verde"	Sofia Ellar	4:03
2.	"Segundas partes entre suicidas"	Sofia Ellar	3:51
3.	"Amor de anticuario"	Sofia Ellar	3:56
4.	"G&T's"	Sofia Ellar	2:43
5.	"Fire of fame"	Sofia Ellar	4:29
6.	"Seis peniques"	Sofia Ellar	3:11
7.	"Hace dos perdices"	Sofia Ellar	3:01
8.	"The mad man"	Sofia Ellar	3:55
9.	"Rock'n'rolles de chiquillos"	Sofia Ellar	3:33
10.	"Spirit Love"	Sofia Ellar	5:02
11.	"Así no"	Sofia Ellar	3:48
12.	"Mundos"	Sofia Ellar	4:16
