= Miki Núñez =

Spanish singer (born 1996)

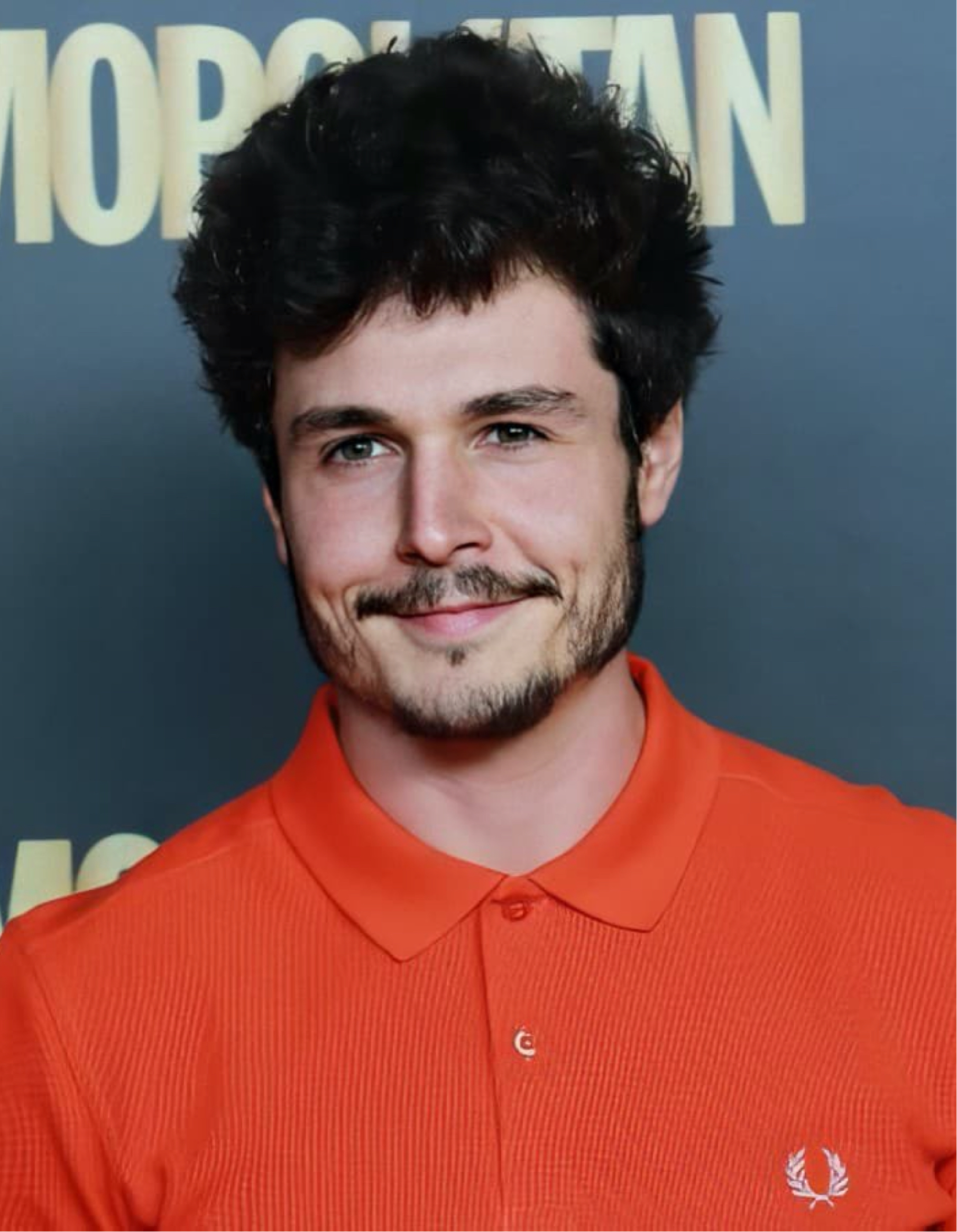
- Núñez in 2020

Background information
- Born: Miguel Núñez Pozo; 6 January 1996 (age 30); Terrassa, Catalonia, Spain
- Genres: Catalan rumba; ska; folk pop
- Occupations: Singer; television presenter
- Years active: 2018–present
- Label: Universal

Miguel "Miki" Núñez Pozo (born 6 January 1996) is a Catalan singer and television personality from Terrassa. He gained national recognition after placing sixth in series ten of the television talent competition Operación Triunfo. Núñez consequently represented Spain at the Eurovision Song Contest in 2019, with the song "La Venda". The singer would release two studio albums afterwards through Universal Music, Amuza (2019) and Iceberg (2020) to great commercial success.

== Career ==
=== 2018–2019: Operación Triunfo and Eurovision Song Contest ===
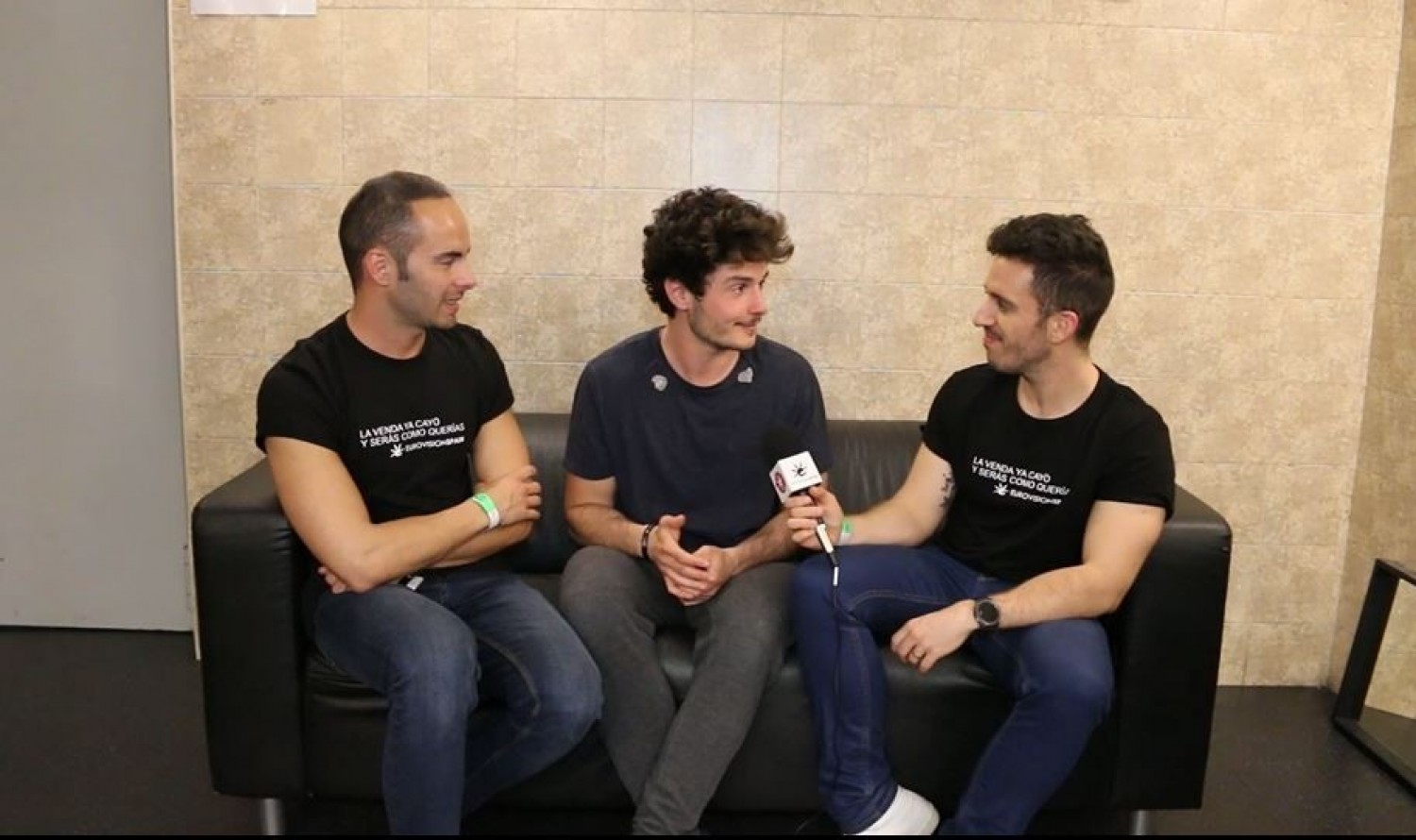
Miki Núñez in an interview in 2019

Before Operación Triunfo, Miki studied guitar and piano, as well as getting a degree as a primary education teacher. He also was a vocalist in the cover band Dalton Bang, with whom he toured Catalonia.

In 2018, Núñez auditioned for the tenth series of Operación Triunfo, being one of the 18 contestants selected for the opening show. He finished in sixth place, reaching the semi-finals of the show.

In 2019, he was one of the 13 Operación Triunfo contestants selected for the show's side competition to choose Spain's entry to the Eurovision Song Contest. He was given a total of three songs: "Nadie se salva", a duet with Natalia Lacunza, and solo songs "El equilibrio" and "La venda". While "El equilibrio" failed to make the first cut, "Nadie se salva" and "La venda" advanced to the Eurovision Gala, making him and Lacunza the only contestants with more than one song to perform in the national final. On 20 January 2019, Núñez received the 34% by audience vote and was selected to represent Spain in the Eurovision Song Contest 2019 with "La venda".

He was the last act to perform at the Eurovision final that year, held in Tel Aviv, Israel. He placed twenty-second out of the 26 participating countries with 54 points: 1 given from the professional juries and 53 from the public televote.

=== 2019: Amuza ===
Núñez released a single titled "Celébrate" on 28 June 2019. The single preceded the release of his first studio album, titled Amuza, on 13 September 2019. The album debuted at number one on the Spanish Albums Chart. The release of the album was followed by a tour in fourteen cities across Spain.

=== 2020–present: Iceberg and television projects ===
On 8 May 2020, Núñez released a single titled "Me Vale". The song was included in his second studio album, titled Iceberg, that was released on 20 November 2020 and debuted at number four on the Spanish Albums Chart.

In October 2020, Núñez debuted as television presenter for the TV3 reality television music competition Cover. In 2022, he hosted another TV3 music talent show, Eufòria, alongside Marta Torné, which he continued to host for seasons 2 and 3. Also in 2022, Telecinco announced Núñez as the host for the online casting of Got Talent España. In January and February 2023, Nuñez, alongside Aitor Albizua, hosted La Noche del Benidorm Fest, the side show of the television song contest Benidorm Fest 2023.

In 2023, Núñez was cast in the supporting role of David in the TV3 teen drama Jo mai mai, which marked his acting debut on television.

== Discography ==
=== Albums ===
Title	Details	Peak position
Title	Details	SPA
Amuza	Released: 13 September 2019; Formats: Digital download, CD; Label: Universal Music Spain	1
Iceberg	Released: 20 November 2020; Formats: Digital download, CD, LP; Label: Universal Music Spain	4
121	Released: 9 June 2023; Formats: Digital download, CD, LP; Label: Universal Music Spain	20
Setlist - Gira 121	Released: 16 December 2023; Formats: Digital download, CD, LP; Label: UMG Recordings, Inc.	—

=== Extended plays ===
Title	Details	Peak position
Title	Details	SPA
La Partida	Released: 29 November 2024; Formats: Digital download; Label: Universal Music Spain	—

=== Singles ===
==== As lead artist ====
Title	Year	Peak chart position	Album or EP
Title	Year	SPA	Album or EP
"La venda"	2019	13	Amuza
"Nadie se salva" (with Natalia Lacunza)	2019	41	Amuza
"Celébrate"	2019	62	Amuza
"Escriurem"	2019	—	Amuza
"Coral del Arrecife" (with Sofia Ellar)	2019	—	Amuza
"Me vale"	2020	95	Iceberg
"Un estiu que no s'acaba"	2020	—	Non-album single
"Viento y vida" (with Despistaos)	2020	—	Iceberg
"No m'ho esperava"	2021	—	Iceberg
"Sin noticias de Gurb"	2021	— (Note: "Sin noticias de Gurb" did not enter the official Spanish Top 100 Songs chart, but peaked at No. 14 on the Spanish Top 50 Radio Airplay chart.)	Iceberg
"10 Minutos"	2022	— (Note: "10 Minutos" did not enter the official Spanish Top 100 Songs chart, but peaked at No. 12 on the Spanish Top 50 Radio Airplay chart.)	121
"Dime que no duele"	2022	— (Note: "Dime que no duele" did not enter the official Spanish Top 100 Songs chart, but peaked at No. 18 on the Spanish Top 50 Radio Airplay chart.)	121
"Electricitat" (with Alfred García)	2022	—	121
"Ahora"	2022	—	Non-album singles
"Ara"	2022	—	Non-album singles
"La mitad" (with Paula Koops)	2023	—	121
"Entre un millón"	2023	— (Note: "Entre un millón" did not enter the official Spanish Top 100 Songs chart, but peaked at No. 31 on the Spanish Top 50 Radio Airplay chart.)	121
"Suerte" (with Carlos Sadness)	2023	—	121
"Gelat"	2023	—	Non-album singles
"Dins del meu cap"	2024	—	Non-album singles
"Tiraria enrere"	2024	—	Non-album singles
"—" denotes a recording that did not chart or was not released.

==== As featured artist ====
Title	Year	Album or EP
"La sortida" (Sense sal featuring Miki Núñez)	2019	Non-album singles
"Tira de la manta" (Emlan featuring Miki Núñez)	2020	Non-album singles
"El Dia de la Victòria" (Buhos featuring Miki Núñez, Suu & Lildami)	2020	Non-album singles
"¿Qué Tal?" (Manel Navarro and Miki Núñez)	2021	Cicatriz
"El tren del temps" (Txarango featuring Miki Núñez and Dave Zulueta)	2021	El Gran Ball
"Barcelona" (Marmi featuring Miki Núñez)	2022	Plan Z
"He tocat el cel" (Sergio Dalma featuring Miki Núñez)	2023	Sonríe porque estás en la foto

==== Promotional singles ====
Title	Year	Peak position	Album or EP
Title	Year	SPA	Album or EP
"El ataque de las chicas cocodrilo" (with Carlos Right)	2018	58	Operación Triunfo 2018: Lo Mejor, Parte 1
"Alma mía" (with Alba Reche)	2018	—	Operación Triunfo 2018: Lo Mejor, Parte 1
"Friday I'm In Love" (with Joan Garrido)	2018	—	Operación Triunfo 2018: Lo Mejor, Parte 1
"Quédate en Madrid" (with Maria Villar)	2018	—	Operación Triunfo 2018
"El patio"	2018	—	Operación Triunfo 2018
"Shallow" (with Natalia Lacunza)	2018	—	Operación Triunfo 2018: Lo Mejor, Parte 2
"No olvidarme de olvidar" (with Sabela Ramil)	2018	—	Operación Triunfo 2018
"Can We Dance"	2018	—	Operación Triunfo 2018
"Una lluna a l'aigua"	2018	88	Operación Triunfo 2018: Lo Mejor, Parte 2
"Promesas que no valen nada"	2018	—	Operación Triunfo 2018
"Hijos de la tierra"	2018	—	Operación Triunfo 2018: Lo Mejor, Parte 2
"Some Nights"	2018	—	Operación Triunfo 2018
"Calypso" (with Famous Oberogo and Sabela Ramil)	2018	—	Operación Triunfo 2018: Lo Mejor, Parte 2
"—" denotes a recording that did not chart or was not released.

== Filmography ==
=== Television ===
Year	Title	Role	Notes
2018–2019	Operación Triunfo	Himself / contestant	16 episodes
2019	Eurovision Song Contest 2019	Himself / Spanish entrant	2 episodes
2019	Paquita Salas	Himself	1 episode
2019	La mejor canción jamás cantada	Himself / Guest contestant	2 episodes
2020	Tu cara me suena	Guest performer / Santiago Auserón impersonator	2 episodes
2020	La casa fuerte	Himself / guest	1 episode
2020	Operación Triunfo	Himself / guest performer	1 episode
2020	Cover	Himself / host	10 episodes
2021	L’au pair	Himself	1 episode
2021	Family Feud: La batalla de los famosos	Himself / contestant	1 episode
2021	Persona infiltrada	Himself	1 episode
2022	Secret Story	Himself / guest	1 episode
2022-present	Eufòria	Himself / host	17 episodes
2022	Got Talent España	Himself / online casting host	
2022–2023	Campanades 2023 TV3	Himself / host	New Year's Eve broadcast
2023	La Noche del Benidorm Fest	Himself / host	
2024	Jo mai mai	David	Supporting role

== Awards and nominations ==
=== Los 40 Music Awards ===
Year	Nominated work	Category	Result	Ref.
2020	Miki Núñez	Best New Artist	Nominated	

== Notes ==
Awards and achievements
Preceded by Amaia & Alfred with "Tu canción"	Spain in the Eurovision Song Contest; 2019	Succeeded by Blas Cantó
