= Jo mai mai =

- Genre: Teen drama; Coming of age
- Created by: Sergi Pompermayer; Mar Picó Seijo; Marc Roma; Uri Garcia
- Based on: Go!azen by ETB 1
- Starring: Claudia Riera; Maria Morera Colomer; Berta Rabascall; Imén Akandouch; Pere Ponce; Jan Buxaderas; Zoé Arnao; Biel Rossell Pelfort
- Country of origin: Spain
- Original language: Catalan
- No. of seasons: 2
- No. of episodes: 16

Original release
- Network: TV3
- Release: January 22, 2024

Jo mai mai (English: Never have I ever, lit. 'I never never') (Note: The title of the series is a play on words that combines the protagonist's name, 'Mai,' with the Catalan expression 'Jo mai mai,' which refers to the game Never Have I Ever) is a Catalan-language Spanish teen drama television series that premiered on TV3 on January 22, 2024. An adaptation of the Basque musical series Go!azen broadcast on ETB 1, the series stars Claudia Riera alongside a young cast and follows a group of teenagers who spend their holidays at summer camp.

Filmed mainly in the Vallès Oriental, Catalonia, the series includes covers of well-known songs by Catalan artists and groups on its soundtrack. In late May 2024, it was renewed for a second season, which premiered on February 10, 2025.

== Premise ==
Mai García Roselló (Claudia Riera), a young woman in her twenties, returns to her parents' house and works as a counselor at their summer camp. The story follows Mai and eight teenagers dealing with love, self-discovery, and friendship.

== Cast ==
=== Main ===
- Claudia Riera as Mai García Roselló
- Maria Morera Colomer as Rita Plana Schepper
- Imén Akandouch as Noor Alaoui
- Berta Rabascall as Èlia Picó Martínez
- Biel Rossell Pelfort com a Ramon Vilardell Coll "Billy"
- Aleix Otem as Oriol Prats González
- Albert Salazar as Manu (season 2)
- Adrià Salazar as Guim (season 2)
- Júlia Westermeyer as Martina (season 2)
- Júlia Padonou as Gio (season 2)
- Jan Buxaderas as Èric Picó Martínez (season 1)
- Zoé Arnao as Sofia Rodríguez (season 1)
- Joel Cojal as Yabsera "Yab" Martí Moral (season 1)

=== Recurring ===
- Miki Núñez as David (season 1)
- Pere Ponce as Pere Garcia
- Mireia Aixalà as Eva Rosselló
