= Famous Oberogo =

- Born: July 23, 1999 (age 27); Amsterdam, the Netherlands
- Genres: Pop; Urban; Afrobeat; Funk; Reggaeton; Soul; Gospel
- Instrument: Voice
- Years active: 2018-present
- Label: independent

Famous Oberogo (born 23 July 1999) is a Spanish singer and songwriter, known for winning Operación Triunfo 2018. He has also worked as a television and musical theater actor.

== Early life ==
Of Nigerian parents, he was born in the capital of the Netherlands, but due to inconveniences that presented to them soon after, they moved back to Nigeria. At the age of 6, he moved to the municipality of Bormujos, in the province of Seville, where he grew up.

He studied art at the Baccalaureate in Bormujos. He combined studies with a passion for music as he sang African gospel in church.

He became interested in music as a field of work as a result of an arm injury, which made it impossible for him to play basketball. As he explained to La Vanguardia, this crushed him and he took refuge in music listening to Alicia Keys and Adele, among others.

== Career ==
In 2018, at the age of 19, he competed in Operación Triunfo as one of the youngest in the edition. His career in the program captivated the audience and the professional jury, with which he reached the final and was proclaimed winner of the contest by popular vote.

After a tour of Spain with the other contestants, he focused on the production and release of his own songs. In August 2019, his first single, "Bulla", was released, which did not have much of an impact. Among others, he has collaborated with Disney and Loterías y Apuestas del Estado.

In February 2020, he left the Universal Music label to join Aloma Music Worldwide. Later, he founded the record label World Famous Music in Nigeria. Currently, however, he is an independent artist.

In October 2022, it was announced its participation in Benidorm Fest 2023, the contest that would select the Spanish entrant for the Eurovision Song Contest, to be held in Liverpool in May 2023. He presented the unpublished song "La Lola", choreographed in part by Juan Montero, who stands out for having worked with Lola Índigo. It is the second time that he tried to represent Spain in Eurovision: when he competed in Operación Triunfo he submitted the song No puedo más. In fact, it is the primary reason why he participated in the talent. However, in 2023 he could not get past the semi-final and was awarded 87 points.

He has established himself as an artist who mixes pop, urban sounds, Afrobeat and reggaeton, soul and gospel. It has also been influenced by soul and funk, his main inspirations are Jason Derulo, Bruno Mars, Pharrell Williams and Loïc Nottet.

Outside of music, he has dabbled in the world of acting as the secretary of the Madrid LGBT association COGAM in an episode of the third season of Paquita Salas in 2019. In addition, he is part of the cast of the musical The Lion King as Mufasa in Madrid in 2022. He also played Déu in La llamada between May and June 2019 in the Sala Cándido Lara of the Lara Theater in Madrid.

The singer has spoken out strongly against racism and xenophobia. In particular, in 2020 he took a position against the Trumpism of the Spanish far-right party Vox through Twitter. Famous currently resides in Madrid.

== Discography ==
=== Albums ===
- Sus canciones (2018)

=== Singles ===
- "I Can't Take It Anymore" (2018)
- "Bulla" (2019)
- "Not Today" (2020)
- "Pamela" (2020)
- "If Love Speaks" (2020)
- "Something" (with Blaq Jerzee) (2021)
- "La Lola" (2022)
