= Oh Long Johnson (album) =

Studio album by Miss Caffeina
- Released: 2019
- Genre: Pop
- Label: DRO 0190295493530 (LP); DRO 0190295493547 (CD)
- Producer: Max Dingel

Miss Caffeina chronology
| Detroit (2016) | Oh Long Johnson (2019) |

Oh Long Johnson is a 2019 album by Spanish pop group Miss Caffeina.

== Background ==
The title of the album was inspired by the famous viral video of the Oh Long Johnson cat. The album was produced by British producer, Max Dingel.

== Chart performance ==
The album was in the Spanish charts for ten weeks, peaking at No. 1 in March 2019.

== Track listing ==
| No | Title | Composer | Time |
|---|---|---|---|
| 01 | "Oh Long Johnson" | Javier Vidal, Sergio Sastre | 3:29 |
| 02 | "Merlí" | Sergio Sastre | 3:32 |
| 03 | "Fiesta Nacional" | "Sergio Delgado, Alberto Jiménez | 3:14 |
| 04 | "Calambre" | Sergio Delgado, Alberto Jiménez | 4:06 |
| 05 | "Reina" | Sergio Delgado, Alberto Jiménez | 3:21 |
| 06 | "Prende" | Javier Vidal, Sergio Sastre | 3:29 |
| 07 | "Planta De Interior" | Alberto Jiménez, – Antonio Poza, Javier Vidal | 3:00 |
| 08 | "Cola De Pez (Fuego)" | Alberto Jiménez, Antonio Poza | 3:34 |
| 09 | "Bitácora" | Alberto Jiménez, Javier Vidal, Sergio Sastre | 3:13 |
| 10 | "El Gran Temblor" | Alberto Jiménez, Javier Vidal, Sergio Sastre | 3:50 |
| 11 | "Ausentes Presentes" | Elvira Sastre, Javier Vidal, Sergio Sastre | 3:58 |
