= La venda =

2019 song by Miki Núñez

Single by Miki Núñez

from the album Amuza
- Language: Spanish
- Released: 18 January 2019; 7 March 2019 (Eurovision ver.)
- Genre: Catalan rumba; Ska
- Length: 3:03
- Label: Universal Music Spain
- Songwriter: Adrià Salas
- Producer: Oriol Padrós

Miki Núñez singles chronology
"La venda" (2019)	"Celébrate" (2019)

Music video
- "La venda" on YouTube

Eurovision Song Contest 2019 entry
- Country: Spain
- Artist: Miki
- Language: Spanish
- Composer: Adrià Salas
- Lyricist: Adrià Salas

Finals performance
- Final result: 22nd
- Final points: 54

Entry chronology
- ◄ "Tu canción" (2018)
- "Universo" (2020) ►

Official performance video
- "La venda" (Final) on YouTube

"La venda" ([la ˈβenda]; transl. The blindfold) is a song performed by Spanish singer Miki written and composed by Adrià Salas. It represented Spain in the Eurovision Song Contest 2019 in Tel Aviv. It finished in 22nd place with 54 points.

== Background ==
=== Conception ===
"La venda" was written and composed by Adrià Salas, who is the lead vocalist of the Latin Grammy-nominated Spanish band La Pegatina.

=== Selection ===
On 14 September 2018, Radiotelevisión Española (RTVE) confirmed that they would use the 10th edition of the music reality program Operación Triunfo to select their act for the 64th edition of the Eurovision Song Contest. Interested and invited songwriters were able to submit their song demos from 1 November 2018 to 15 November 2018. Seventeen selected songs (via the public call and via invitation) were allocated by the talent show's boarding academy's staff to thirteen of the sixteen eligible contestants in solo and duet combinations. The allocation was announced on 11 December 2018. The contestants recorded a one-minute demo of their respective songs. The demos were made available to the public via RTVE's official website on the night between 19 December 2018 and 20 December 2018, during the finale when the regular winner of the season was determined. An online public vote ran until 2 January 2019, enabling each user to vote for their three favorite entries each day.

The three entries with the most votes advanced to the special live show "Gala Eurovisión", the special live show where the Spanish public would choose both the song and its performers for Eurovision. A five-member evaluation committee — consisting of two members representing RTVE's management, a member from the digital branch of RTVE, and two teachers from Operación Triunfo's boarding academy — selected seven additional entries from the fourteen remaining songs, "La venda" among them, for "Gala Eurovisión."

Miki performed it live for the first time on "Gala Eurovisión" on 20 January 2019. The song won the competition with 34% of the public vote becoming the Spanish entrant, and Miki the performer, for Eurovision.

=== Promotion ===
The official video featuring the final version of the song, directed by Adrià Pujol and Fèlix Cortés, was filmed on 13 February 2019 at the Mercantic antique market in Sant Cugat del Vallès and was released on 7 March 2019.

Miki made appearances across Europe to specifically promote "La venda" as the Spanish Eurovision entry. He performed at the Eurovision in Concert event at the AFAS Live venue in Amsterdam, Netherlands on 6 April; the London Eurovision Party at the Café de Paris venue in London, United Kingdom on 14 April, and the Moscow Eurovision Party at the Vegas City Hall venue in Moscow, Russia on 24 April.

In addition to his international appearances, Miki performed "La venda" as a guest on competitive dance reality television series Fama, ¡a bailar!, aired on #0, on 26 March. On 30 March, he performed the song at the Plaza de Oriente in Madrid on occasion of the Earth Hour. On 20 April, he performed during the Eurovision-Spain Pre-Party event which was held at the Sala La Riviera venue in Madrid. On 8 May, the special concert event Miki y amigos, which aired on RTVE's official website and YouTube channel, centered on him, accompanied by guest performers.

=== Eurovision ===
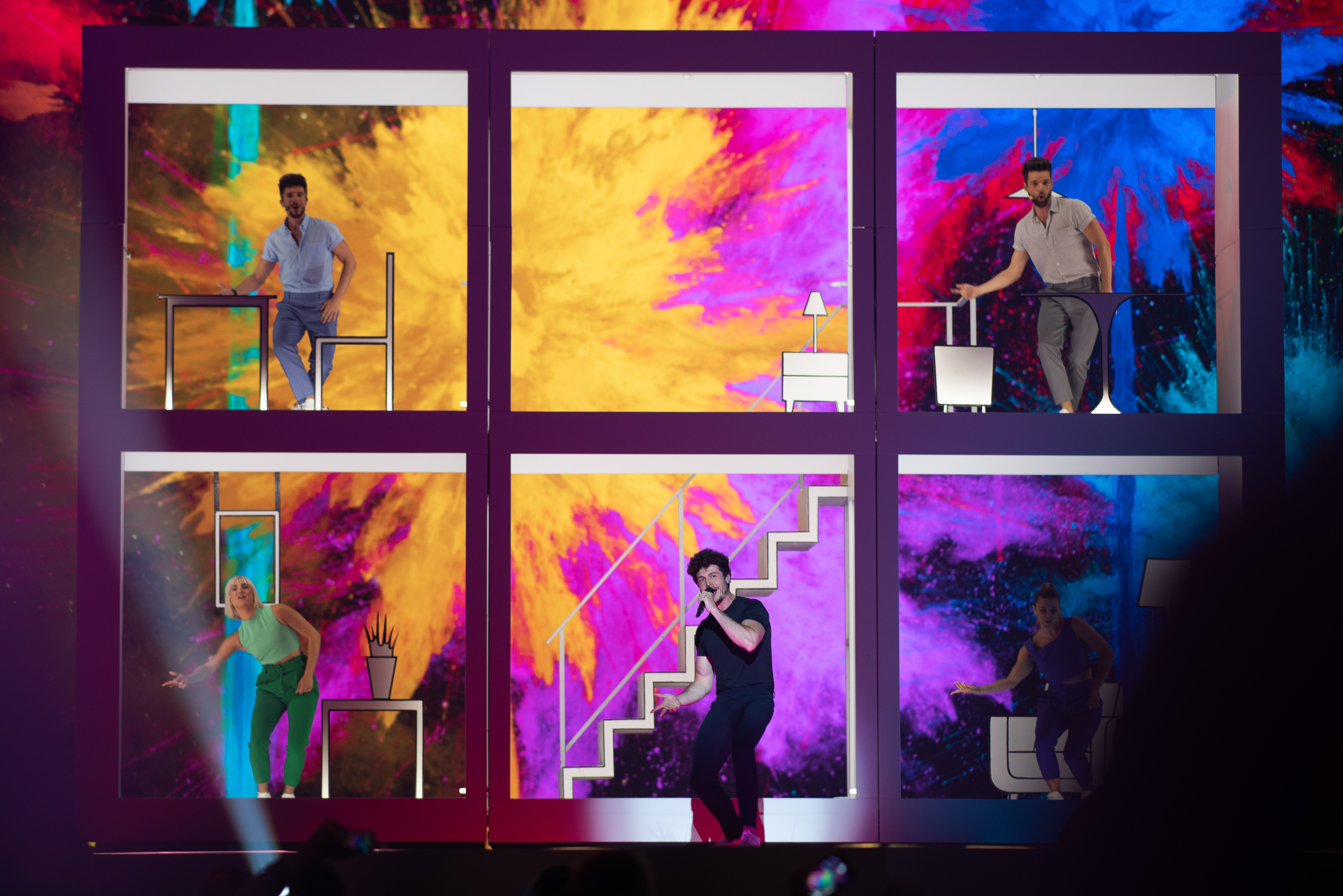
Miki performing "La venda" in Eurovision.

On 18 May 2019, the grand final of the Eurovision Song Contest was held at the Expo Tel Aviv in Tel Aviv hosted by the Israeli Public Broadcasting Corporation (IPBC/Kan). As Spain is a member of the "Big Five", the song automatically advanced to the final. Miki performed "La venda" twenty-sixth and last on the evening. The performance was staged by Fokas Evangelinos. Miki was joined in stage by backing singers and dancers Mikel Hennet (who represented Spain in the 2007 Contest as part of D'Nash), Ernesto Santos, Fran Guerrero, María Acosta, and Mary Martínez.

At the end of voting, the song finished in twenty-second place with 54 points: 1 from the professional juries and 53 from the televote.

== Critical response ==
Judy Cantor-Navas of Billboard described "La venda" as a "rousing party anthem, the kind of popular Spanish song that typically animates both soccer stadiums and neighborhood festivals" and as a Eurovision entry that "will please the crowd" rather than "depend on the artist's vocal talent to wow the judges and audience voters".

== Track listing ==
Digital download
No.	Title	Length
1.	"La venda"	3:03

Digital download - Revamped version
No.	Title	Length
1.	"La venda (Eurovision Song Contest / Tel Aviv 2019)"	2:59

== Charts ==
Chart (2019)	Peak position
Spain (PROMUSICAE)	13

== Release history ==
Region	Date	Format	Version	Label
Various	18 January 2019	Digital download	Original	Universal Music Spain
Various	7 March 2019	Digital download	Revamped	Universal Music Spain
