= Miss Caffeina =

Indie rock and pop music group

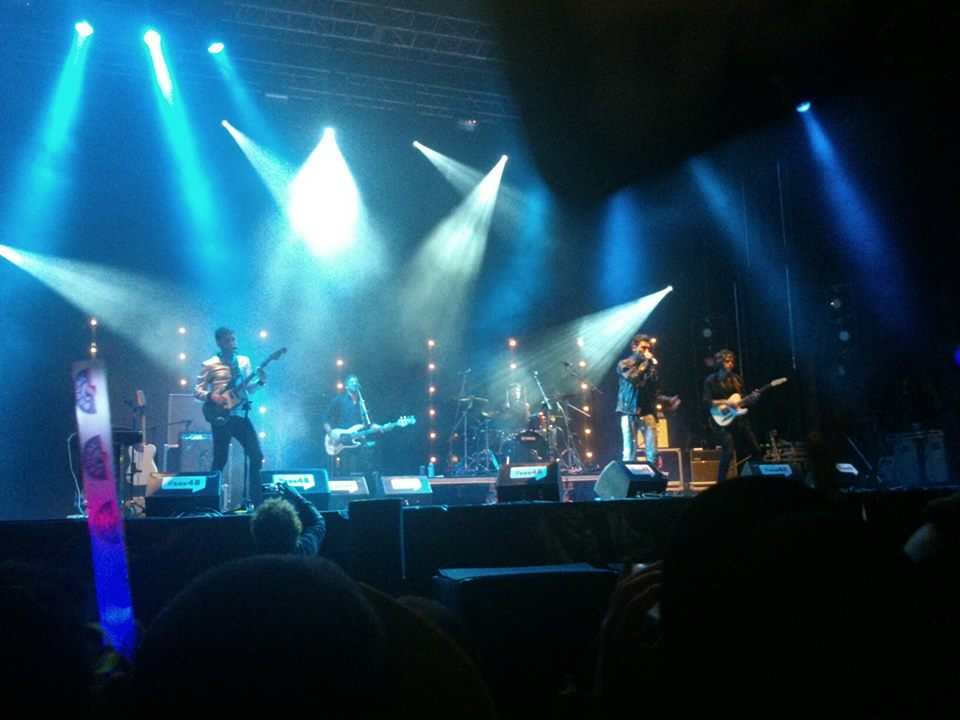
- Picture of Miss Caffeina in the SOS, 2014

Background information
- Origin: Spain
- Genres: Pop
- Years active: 2006 to present
- Label: DRO
- Members: Alberto Jiménez; Antonio Poza; Sergio Sastre
- Past members: Álvaro Navarro; Román Méndez

Miss Caffeina are a pop group from Spain who have released a number of singles since 2007. They have also released four albums since 2010. In 2019, their latest album reached number one in Spanish charts.

== Background ==
Formed in Spain in 2006, their style ranges from pop, rock, indie, and Spanish styled music.

== Career ==
Their debut album, Imposibilidad Del Fenómeno, was released in 2010.

In 2019, they released the album, Oh Long Johnson. The inspiration for the album title came from the Oh Long Johnson viral cat video. The reasoning was that it served as a reminder on how people concentrate on absurd things while the important things pass by. The album was a hit. It stayed in the Spanish charts for a total of ten weeks, peaking at #1 in March 2019.

Miss Caffeina competed in Benidorm Fest 2024, the Spanish selection for the Eurovision Song Contest 2024, with the song "Bla bla bla". They came fourth in their semi-final on 30 January 2024, qualifying for the final, where they finished last.

In 2024 they composed "Cuando acabe el verano" as the official theme song of the Vuelta a España, a professional cycling race. They performed the song live after the final stage on September 8th.

== Discography ==
AlbumsSpanish releases unless indicated otherwise
Title	Catalogue	Year	Notes #
Imposibilidad Del Fenómeno	Gig'n'Tik Music Records 88697822922; Octubre 88697822922; Sony Music 88697822922	2010	
De Polvo Y Flores	DRO 25646511167	2013	CD & LP
Detroit	DRO 2564648480	2016	
Oh Long Johnson	DRO 0190295493547	2019	DRO 0190295493530 (LP)
