= Tony Aguilar (radio personality) =

Spanish presenter and television presenter

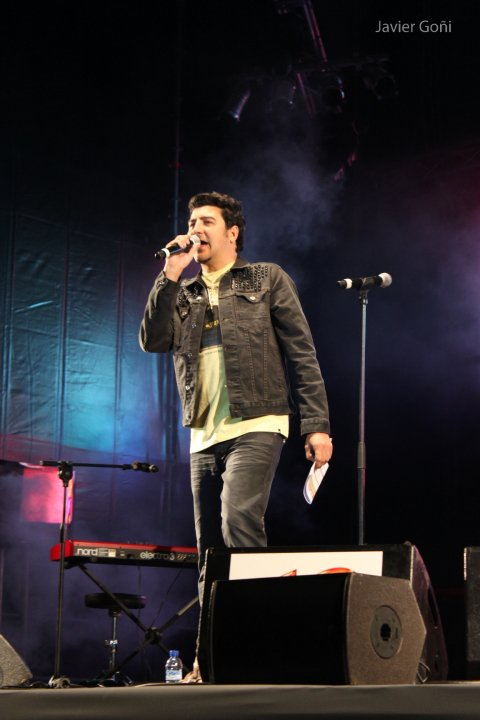
- Born: Antonio Aguilar Rodríguez; 4 May 1973 (age 52); Cornellà de Llobregat (Barcelona), Spain
- Occupation(s): Radio DJ, television presenter

Antonio "Tony" Aguilar Rodríguez (born 4 May 1973) is a Spanish radio DJ and television presenter.

== Career ==
=== Radio ===
In the early 1990s, Aguilar was the runner-up in a national disc jockey contest, and as a result he was hired for the local broadcast of Los 40 in Radio Barcelona.

In 1995, Aguilar debuted in nationwide radio with radio breakfast show Anda ya on Los 40, which he hosted until 1998. He also presents the hitlist show Del 40 al 1 since 1995. In 1998, Aguilar started to present 40 Principales Radio Show.

Since 2015, Aguilar hosts 40 Global Show, a music programme that airs in twelve (eleven before the creation of Los 40 Nicaragua in 2017) Spanish-speaking countries of the Los 40 radio network.

=== Television ===
In television, Aguilar hosted the music shows Leña al mono que es de goma on Antena 3 in 1993, and Zona franca, alongside Arancha de Benito, on TVE in 1995. On 40 TV, he hosted Fórmula Weekend alongside Joaquín Luqui in 1999, as well as Los 40 Principales between 2000 and 2005, and the television version of the hitlist show Del 40 al 1 until the channel's closure in 2017. Aguilar then hosted Coca Cola Music Experience on Cuatro.

In 2014, Aguilar was an occasional panelist for the talk show ¡Qué tiempo tan feliz!, hosted by María Teresa Campos on Telecinco. In 2017, he was a panelist on the Spanish version of the talent show Fantastic Duo, on La 1. In 2017 and 2018, Aguilar was also an occasional panelist for the talk show Viva la vida, on Telecinco. In 2019, Aguilar was a judge on the La 1 music show La mejor canción jamás cantada, as well as a regular panelist on the La 1 talk show A partir de hoy.

Since 2018, Aguilar has been the Spanish co-commentator for the Eurovision Song Contest and Junior Eurovision Song Contest alongside Julia Varela. The 2020 Junior Contest and the Eurovision: Europe Shine a Light special were both commented on together with journalists Eva Mora and Víctor Escudero.

== Awards ==
In 2011, Aguilar was nominated for a National Radio Award for Best Music Presenter. In 2016, Aguilar won the Ondas Award for Best Music Programme for Del 40 al 1.
