= Sofia Ellar =

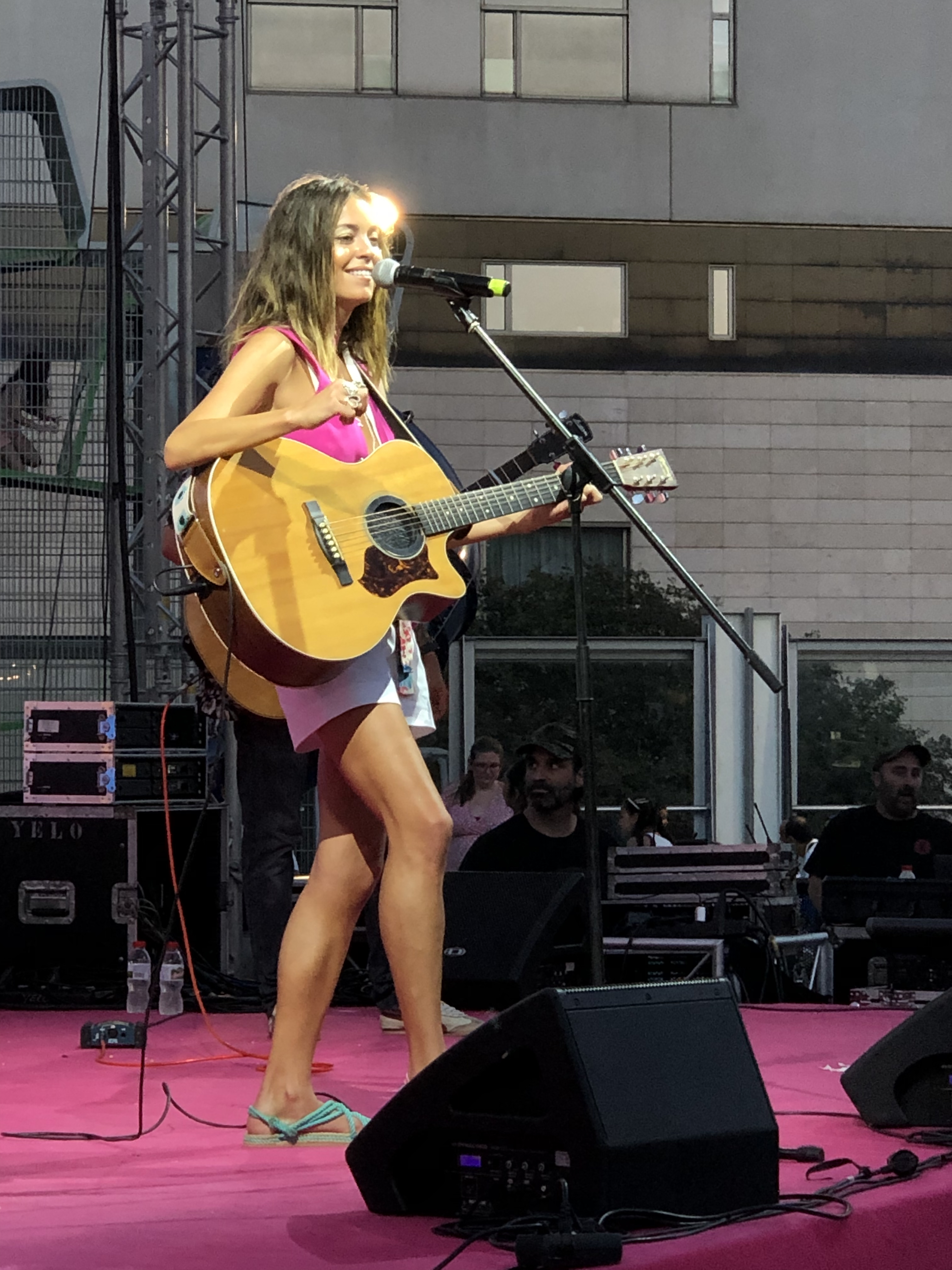
- Performing at Barcelona, 2023
- Born: Sofía Lecubarri y Ruigómez; 15 November 1993 (age 32); London, England
- Occupations: Singer; Songwriter
- Years active: 2016–present
- Musical career
- Genres: Pop
- Instruments: Vocals; Guitar
- Website: sofiaellar.com

Sofía Lecubarri Ruigómez (born 15 November 1993) known professionally as Sofia Ellar (/ˈɛlɑːr/), is a British-Spanish singer and songwriter. Born and raised for her first years in London, she started performing in various small singing concerts as a child in the early 2000s, when she moved to Madrid. She graduated from IE University with a degree in business administration and has continued with her musical career since. Ellar is praised for her close connection with fans, notably visible in her concerts, where she can often be seen intimately surrounded by the audience.

== Career ==
She has been the host of numerous radio and television interviews, and has participated in various tours around Spain. As of September 2017, her videos on YouTube reached several million views and her tracks on Spotify, three million.

On 24 February 2017, her first album, Seis peniques, was released. Its first single, entitled Segundas partes entre suicidas, marked her entrance to Spotify.

In December 2017 Sofia Ellar announced that all the revenue obtained from her single, titled Humanidad en Paro, would be destined to different charities supporting homelessness.

== Discography ==
=== Albums ===
- Seis peniques (2017)
- Nota en Do (2018)

=== Singles ===
- Verano con Lima (2017)
- Cenas que Acaban en Juerga (2017)

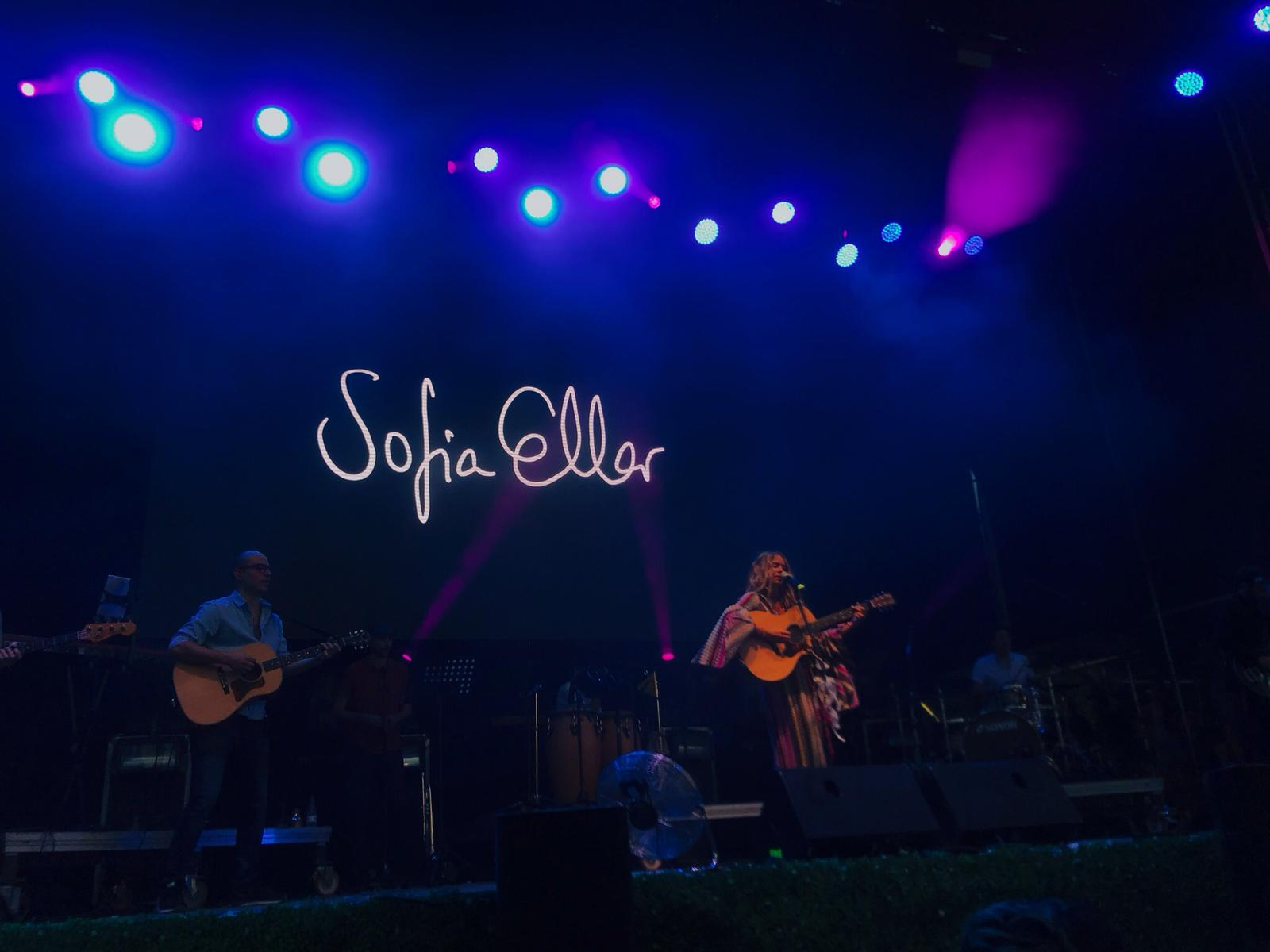
Ellar performing in Málaga, 2018

- Humanidad en Paro (2017)
- Tus Movidas (2018)
- Versión de Cobarde (2018)
- No Fue Mentira - Sesiones Moraima (2018)
- Bañarnos en Vaqueros (2019)
- Ahora Dime (2019)
- La Revolución (2019)
- Media Tinta (2019)
- Ana - ft. Ana (2019)
- Barrer a casa (2020)
- Si es roma Amor (2020)

== Filmography ==
- The Angry Birds Movie 2 (2019)
- Si yo fuera rico (2019)

== Tours ==
- Bañarnos en Vaqueros Tour (2019)
