= Natalia Lacunza =

Spanish singer-songwriter (born 1999)

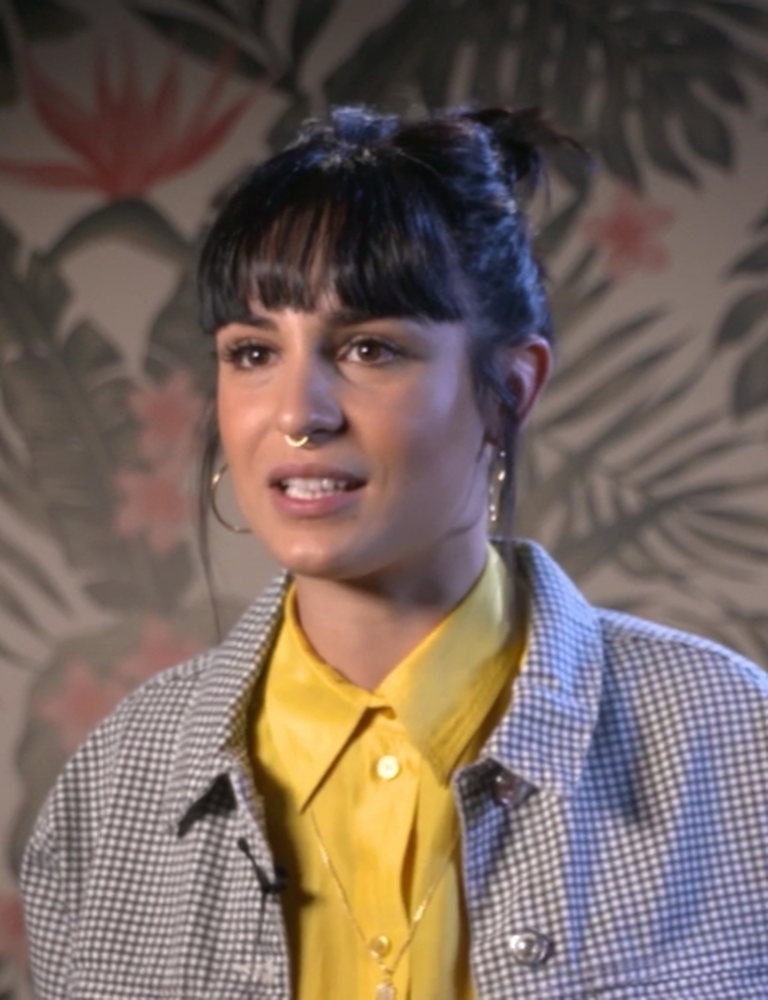

Background information
- Born: Natalia Lacunza Sanabdón; 10 January 1999 (age 27); Pamplona, Spain
- Genres: Indie pop; alternative pop; bedroom pop
- Occupations: Singer, model
- Instruments: Vocals; guitar; fiddle; piano
- Years active: 2018–present
- Partner: Mikel D. Etxeberría (2017–2018) Alba Reche (2018–2019) María Lázaro (2020–2021)

Natalia Lacunza Sanabdón (born 10 January 1999) is a Spanish singer-songwriter. She first gained national recognition in 2018, placing third in series 10 of the Spanish reality television talent competition Operación Triunfo, behind Alba Reche and Famous Oberogo. While competing in Operación Triunfo, she announced a tour in Córdoba. In spring 2019, she signed a record deal with Universal Music Spain and released her debut extended play, Otras Alas, in June 2019. The EP featured her debut single "Nana Triste", which features Spanish indie pop singer Guitarricadelafuente. The song reached the fourth position on the PROMUSICAE chart while the EP topped it for two consecutive weeks and earned a gold certification in less than a month. Her second EP, which she titled EP2, was released on March 13, 2020, topped the Spanish Albums chart for a week and spawned three singles.

== Early life ==
Natalia Lacunza was born in Pamplona, Spain, on 10 January 1999. Even since her early years, Natalia felt an emotional connection to music. As a child, she studied fiddle at her local conservatory. Coming from a family of musicians and actors, Natalia started playing minor roles in small theatre productions, since one of her uncles owned a theatre company. That was when she discovered her passion for entertainment and musical theatre. As a teen, she also learned to play the guitar and continued attending dance lessons, something she had been doing since childhood. Even though she did ballet at first, Lacunza has shown a particular love for contemporary and modern dance.

Barely two years into university life, she quit studying audiovisual communication at the University of Navarra to focus on her musical career. She started as a singer under the stage name Elian Bay, which was inspired by James Bay, one of her favorite artists. In 2017 she auditioned for the musical television contest La Voz. She sang "I Lived" by One Republic but was disqualified after the blind auditions. In June 2018 she auditioned for series ten of the Spanish reality television musical contest Operación Triunfo. She auditioned with the release of the self-written track "Don't Ask", which was written in English. The audition was successful and she entered the show in September 2018. Lacunza would end up becoming one of the contest's favorite acts, which would eventually get her to the finale, shortly before Christmas. She earned herself third place overall. In January 2019, she was picked as a candidate to represent Spain at the 2019 Eurovision Song Contest. In the end, Lacunza's spot was taken by Miki Núñez, which didn't seem to bother her in the slightest. When asked why, Lacunza told the media about the pressure and liability of partaking in such a prolific contest as a new artist.

== Career ==
=== 2019–2021: Otras Alas and EP2 ===
After leaving Operación Triunfo in December 2018 and failing to represent Spain at the 2019 Eurovision Song Contest, she began working on her solo projects. In February a co-headlining tour with her talent show peers started in Madrid. Said tour ended in Cádiz in August, comprising 13 concerts and reuniting over 120,000 fans. In the spring, Lacunza signed a record deal with Universal Music Spain to release an extended play. Thus, on June 4, 2019, the singer revealed that she would be releasing her debut single alongside Spanish guitarist and novel artist Guitarricadelafuente on June 14. "Nana Triste" received very positive reviews by press and general public and impulsed the careers of both artists. One week later, on June 21, she released her debut EP "Otras Alas" which featured underground artists Guitarricadelafuente and Marem Ladson and drew comparisons to Billie Eilish. The project was certified gold in Spain for selling over 20,000 copies after two weeks. The EP also topped the Spanish Album charts for two consecutive weeks. In July "Tarántula" was released as its second single. Throughout the year, the singer promoted her record at a special gala at Joy Eslava, at the Coca-Cola Music Experience or even at the 2019 New Year's Eve special TVE programme.

In January 2020 Lacunza was nominated for 'Best New Artist', 'Best Female Act' and 'Best Album' for Otras Alas at the 2020 Premios Odeón. She also started teasing her next project. On January 24 she released its respective lead single "Olvídate de Mí" on streaming and music download platforms. She performed the song at Operación Triunfo's eleventh edition. In February she released its second single titled 'Algo Duele Más' featuring BRONQUIO and collaborated on "En Llamas" alongside 2018 X-Factor winner Pol Granch. The EP, which she titled EP2 (and a raining cloud emoji) was released on March 13, 2020, physically and digitally. Lacunza was scheduled to do a few signing parties in selected cities in Spain and to tour the country from March 26 to late summer. However, due to the COVID-19 pandemic, all these plans were cancelled. The tour is set to begin in October 2020. EP2 debuted atop the Spanish Album chart. On June 19, Lacunza released a live extended play titled "En Casa", which includes four songs from EP2 performed in an acoustic version at her house. That same day a 2-side single vinyl that includes "Olvídate de Mí" and "Algo Duele Más" was commercialized in selected stores as part of the "Record Store Day" campaign, which hopes to save CD stores from closing.

=== 2022–2023: Debut album and Duro EP ===
On June 10, 2022, Lacunza released her debut studio album, "Tiene Que Ser Para Mí" after being announced in May and being preceded by the single "Todo Va A Cambiar". On November 11, she began the Tiene Que Ser Para Mí Tour, starting in Zaragoza and ending on March 2 in Pamplona, after 12 shows. The songs "Intro (Duro)" and "Nunca Llega 05" were released on 9 June and 30 June, respectively. Both songs featured on their third EP, "DURO", released on 29 September. Before its release, a third single "Verdadero" was released on 27 September. The EP was released on digital platforms and 10" vinyl format only.

== Discography ==
=== EPs ===
- otras alas (2019)
- ep2 (2020)
- DURO (2023)

=== Albums ===
- Tiene Que Ser Para Mí (2022)

=== Live albums ===
- En Casa (2020)

=== Singles ===
==== Lead ====
Year	Single	Collaboration	Best positions in the tables ESP	Albums
2018	Don't Ask	—	-	—N/a
2019	Nana Triste	Guitarricadelafuente	4	Otras Alas
2019	Tarantula	—	52	Otras Alas
2020	Olvídate de Mí	—	64	EP2
2020	Algo Duele Más	BRONQUIO	-	EP2
2020	A Otro Lado	—	91	EP2
2020	Nuestro Nombre	—	-	—N/a
2021	Quiero Dormir Contigo	Trashi	-	—N/a
2021	Cuestión de Suerte	—	-	-
2021	Todo Lamento	—	-	-
2025	Un Castigo	Jesse Baez		
2025	Apego Feroz	--	--	--

==== Other Songs ====
- La Clave (2019)
- "Corre" (El Internado: Las Cumbres OST) (2020)

=== Collaborations ===
- Nadie se salva (with Miki Núñez) (2019)
- "Otras Alas" (with Marem Ladson) (2019)
- "llueve" (with Mori) (2020)
- "Modo avión" (with Cariño) (2020)
- "Enfance80" (with Videoclub) (2020)
- "Cuando Te Fuiste" (with Aitana) (2020)
- "Si Volvemos a Querernos" (with Chill Chicos) (2020)
- "No estás" (with Maria Blaya) (2021)
- "Pensar en Ti" (with Gange) (2022)
- "Me He Pillao x Ti" (with Ana Mena) (2023)

== Tours ==
=== Headlining ===
- Tiny Tour (2020)
- A Otro Lado Tour (2020–2021)
- Tiene Que Ser Para Mí Tour (2022–2023)

=== Co-headlining ===
- OT 2018 en concierto (2019)
