= Latvia in the Eurovision Song Contest 2019 =

- Eurovision Song Contest 2019
- Country: Latvia
- Selection process: Supernova 2019
- Selection date: 16 February 2019

Competing entry
- Song: "That Night"
- Artist: Carousel
- Songwriters: Mārcis Vasiļevskis; Sabīne Žuga

Placement
- Semi-final result: Failed to qualify (15th)

Participation chronology

Latvia was represented at the Eurovision Song Contest 2019 with the song "That Night" written by Mārcis Vasiļevskis and Sabīne Žuga. The song was performed by the band Carousel. The Latvian broadcaster Latvijas Televīzija (LTV) organized the national final Supernova 2019 in order to select the Latvian entry for the 2019 contest in Tel Aviv, Israel. 16 songs were selected to compete in the national final, which consisted of three shows: two semi-finals and a final. In the semi-finals on 26 January and 2 February 2019, four entries were selected to advance from each show. Eight songs ultimately qualified to compete in the final on 16 February 2019 where a public televote and a five-member jury panel selected "That Night" performed by Carousel as the winner.

Latvia was drawn to compete in the second semi-final of the Eurovision Song Contest which took place on 16 May 2019. Performing during the show in position 5, "That Night" was not announced among the top 10 entries of the second semi-final and therefore did not qualify to compete in the final. It was later revealed that Latvia placed fifteenth out of the 18 participating countries in the semi-final with 50 points.

== Background ==
Prior to the 2019 contest, Latvia had participated in the Eurovision Song Contest nineteen times since its first entry in 2000. Latvia won the contest once in 2002 with the song "I Wanna" performed by Marie N. Following the introduction of semi-finals for the 2004, Latvia was able to qualify to compete in the final between 2005 and 2008. Between 2009 and 2014, the nation had failed to qualify to the final for six consecutive years before managing to qualify to the final in 2015 and 2016. In 2017 and 2018, Latvia had failed to qualify to the final for two consecutive years including with their 2018 entry "Funny Girl" performed by Laura Rizzotto.

The Latvian national broadcaster, Latvijas Televīzija (LTV), broadcasts the event within Latvia and organises the selection process for the nation's entry. LTV confirmed their intentions to participate at the 2019 Eurovision Song Contest on 27 July 2018. Latvia has selected their entries for the Eurovision Song Contest through a national final. Since their debut in 2000 until 2012, LTV had organised the selection show Eirodziesma. In a response to the nation's failure to qualify to the final at Eurovision since 2008, between 2013 and 2014, the competition was rebranded and retooled as Dziesma. After failing to produce successful entries those two years, LTV developed and had organised the Supernova national final since 2015. In late August 2018, the broadcaster announced that they would organise Supernova 2019 in order to select the Latvian entry for the 2019 contest.

== Before Eurovision ==
=== Supernova 2019 ===
Supernova 2019 was the fifth edition of Supernova, the music competition that selects Latvia's entries for the Eurovision Song Contest. The competition commenced on 26 January 2019 and concluded with a final on 16 February 2019. All shows in the competition took place at the Riga Film Studio in Riga, hosted by Dagmāra Legante, Ketija Šēnberga and Mārtiņš Kapzems and broadcast on LTV1 as well as online via the streaming platform Replay.lv.

==== Format ====
The format of the competition consisted of four shows: two semi-finals and a final. The two semi-finals, held on 26 January and 2 February 2019, each featured eight competing entries from which four advanced to the final from each show. The final, held on 16 February 2019, selected the Latvian entry for Tel Aviv from the remaining eight entries. Results during the semi-final and final shows were determined by the 50/50 combination of votes from a jury panel and a public vote. Both the jury and public vote assigned points from 1 to 8 based on ranking, with the first place receiving one point and last place receiving seven points. Ties were decided in favour of the entries that received higher points from the public. Viewers were able to vote once per each phone number via telephone, via SMS. The online vote conducted through the official Supernova website allowed users to vote once per each accepted social network account: Draugiem.lv, Facebook and Twitter. Votes conducted through Spotify were based on unique listener counts, with each stream counting as one vote for each entry. Between 6 and 16 February 2019, the public was also able to vote for the eight finalists via the Overly mobile application, which was organised by LTV in cooperation with Alfa Park. In addition to selecting the Latvian entry for Eurovision, a monetary prize of €5,000 was awarded to the winning artist by the financial institution Ondo.lv.

The jury participated in each show by providing feedback to the competing artists and selecting entries to advance in the competition. The panel consisted of:

- Rūdolfs Budze–DJ Rudd – DJ and producer
- Artis Dvarionas – producer at Radio SWH
- Linda Leen – singer, songwriter and producer
- Ralfs Eilands – musician, member of 2013 Latvian Eurovision entrants PeR
- Petri Mannonen – representative of Universal Music Finland and the Baltics

==== Competing entries ====
Artists and songwriters were able to submit their entries to the broadcaster between 3 September 2018 and 21 October 2018. 64 valid entries out of 83 were submitted at the conclusion of the submission period. A jury panel appointed by LTV evaluated the submitted songs and shortlisted 33 entries. Auditions in front of an alternate jury panel took place on 21 and 22 November 2018, and performances of the 33 shortlisted entries were listed online on the official Supernova YouTube channel and website supernova.lsm.lv, the latter allowing users to either select the "For", "Against" or "Abstain" option for each entry between 26 and 30 November 2018. The jury panel for the auditions that determined the sixteen performers and songs while taking the results of the online vote into consideration consisted of Ilze Jansone (producer of Supernova), Agnese Cimuška-Rekke (Executive Director of the Latvian Music Development Society) and two members of the jury panel during the live shows: Artis Dvarionas and Rūdolfs Budze–DJ Rudd. The sixteen competing artists and songs were announced on 5 December 2018.

Artist	Song	Songwriter(s)
Adriana Miglāne	"Scared of Love"	Jānis Driksna, Monta Ķimene
Aivo Oskis	"Somebody's Got My Lover"	Ruslans Kuksinovičs, Aivo Oskis
Alekss Silvērs	"Fireworks"	Aminata Savadogo
Carousel	"That Night"	Mārcis Vasiļevskis, Sabīne Žuga
Double Faced Eels	"Fire"	Mārtiņš Gailītis, Reinis Straume
Dziļi Violets feat. Kozmens	"Tautas dziesma"	Nauris Brikmanis, Valters Osis, Viesturs Butāns, Edgars Jercums, Jānis Skutelis, Mārtiņš Kozlovskis
Edgars Kreilis	"Cherry Absinthe"	Edgars Kreilis, Jūlijs Melngailis, Arnis Račinskis
Elza Rozentāle	"You Came on Tiptoe"	Māra Upmane-Holšteine, Mārtiņš Gailītis, Jānis Niedra, Elza Rozentāle, Reinis Straume
Kris and Oz	"Midnight Streets"	Artūrs Osipovs, Kristīna Morins, Aleksandrs Solovjovs
Kristiāna	"Remedy"	Kristiāna Bumbiere
Laika Upe	"Listen to the Way that I Breathe"	Armands Varslavāns, Annemarija Linka
Laime Pilnīga	"Awe"	Ervīns Ramiņš, Mārcis Vasiļevskis, Elvijs Mamedovs, Jānis Olekšs
Līga Rīdere	"Būšu tepat"	Arnis Ieviņš, Līga Rīdere
Markus Riva	"You Make Me So Crazy"	Markus Riva, Roman Nepomiashchyi
Peress	"Smaragdi un pelni"	Kristīne Pastare, Ieva Katkovska, Iluta Alsberga
Samanta Tīna	"Cutting the Wire"	Arnis Račinskis, Lisbee Stainton, Samanta Tīna

==== Shows ====
===== Semi-finals =====
The two semi-finals took place on 26 January and 2 February 2019. In each semi-final eight acts competed and four entries qualified to the final based on the combination of votes from a jury panel and the Latvian public.

Semi-final 1 – 26 January 2019
R/O	Artist	Song	Jury rank	Public vote rank	Place
1	Kris and Oz	"Midnight Streets"	8	8	8
2	Alekss Silvērs	"Fireworks"	6	7	7
3	Līga Rīdere	"Būšu tepat"	6	5	6
4	Laime Pilnīga	"Awe"	1	3	1
5	Edgars Kreilis	"Cherry Absinthe"	2	2	2
6	Elza Rozentāle	"You Came on Tiptoe"	5	6	6
7	Aivo Oskis	"Somebody's Got My Lover"	3	4	4
8	Samanta Tīna	"Cutting the Wire"	4	1	3

Semi-final 2 – 2 February 2019
R/O	Artist	Song	Jury rank	Public vote rank	Place
1	Dziļi Violets feat. Kozmens	"Tautas dziesma"	4	4	4
2	Peress	"Smaragdi un pelni"	2	8	5
3	Laika Upe	"Listen to the Way that I Breathe"	8	6	8
4	Carousel	"That Night"	1	3	1
5	Kristiāna	"Remedy"	5	7	6
6	Double Faced Eels	"Fire"	3	2	2
7	Adriana Miglāne	"Scared of Love"	7	5	6
8	Markus Riva	"You Make Me So Crazy"	5	1	3

===== Final =====
The final took place on 16 February 2019. The eight entries that qualified from the semi-finals competed. The song with the highest number of votes based on the combination of votes from a jury panel and the public, "That Night" performed by Carousel, was declared the winner. In addition to the performances of the competing entries, the show featured guest performances by singers Patrisha and VIŅA.

Final – 16 February 2019
R/O	Artist	Song	Jury rank	Public vote rank	Place
1	Markus Riva	"You Make Me So Crazy"	5	1	2
2	Edgars Kreilis	"Cherry Absinthe"	4	7	6
3	Aivo Oskis	"Somebody's Got My Lover"	8	8	8
4	Double Faced Eels	"Fire"	3	4	4
5	Dziļi Violets feat. Kozmens	"Tautas dziesma"	7	3	5
6	Laime Pilnīga	"Awe"	2	5	3
7	Samanta Tīna	"Cutting the Wire"	6	6	7
8	Carousel	"That Night"	1	2	1

Detailed public vote
R/O	Song	Public Vote	Internet	Spotify streams	Overly app	Rank
1	"You Make Me So Crazy"	23.86%	17.38%	24.48%	42.25%	1
2	"Cherry Absinthe"	3.68%	3.53%	6.30%	1.94%	7
3	"Somebody's Got My Lover"	1.22%	0.85%	12.00%	1.94%	8
4	"Fire"	5.44%	8.64%	39.46%	11.24%	4
5	"Tautas dziesma"	13.46%	17.88%	4.59%	17.05%	3
6	"Awe"	18.33%	14.85%	4.80%	6.20%	5
7	"Cutting the Wire"	8.73%	10.61%	3.80%	10.85%	6
8	"That Night"	25.28%	26.26%	4.57%	8.53%	2

==== Ratings ====
Viewing figures by show
Show	Date	Viewing figures		Ref.
Show	Date	Nominal	Share	Ref.
Final	24 February 2018	127,800	6.8%	

=== Promotion ===
Prior to the contest, Carousel specifically promoted "That Night" as the Latvian Eurovision entry on 14 April 2019 by performing during the London Eurovision Party, which was held at the Café de Paris venue in London and hosted by Nicki French and Paddy O'Connell. In addition to their international appearance, on 12 April, Carousel performed during the Eurovision PreParty Riga, which was organised by OGAE Latvia and held at the Crystal Club Concert Hall in Riga.

== At Eurovision ==
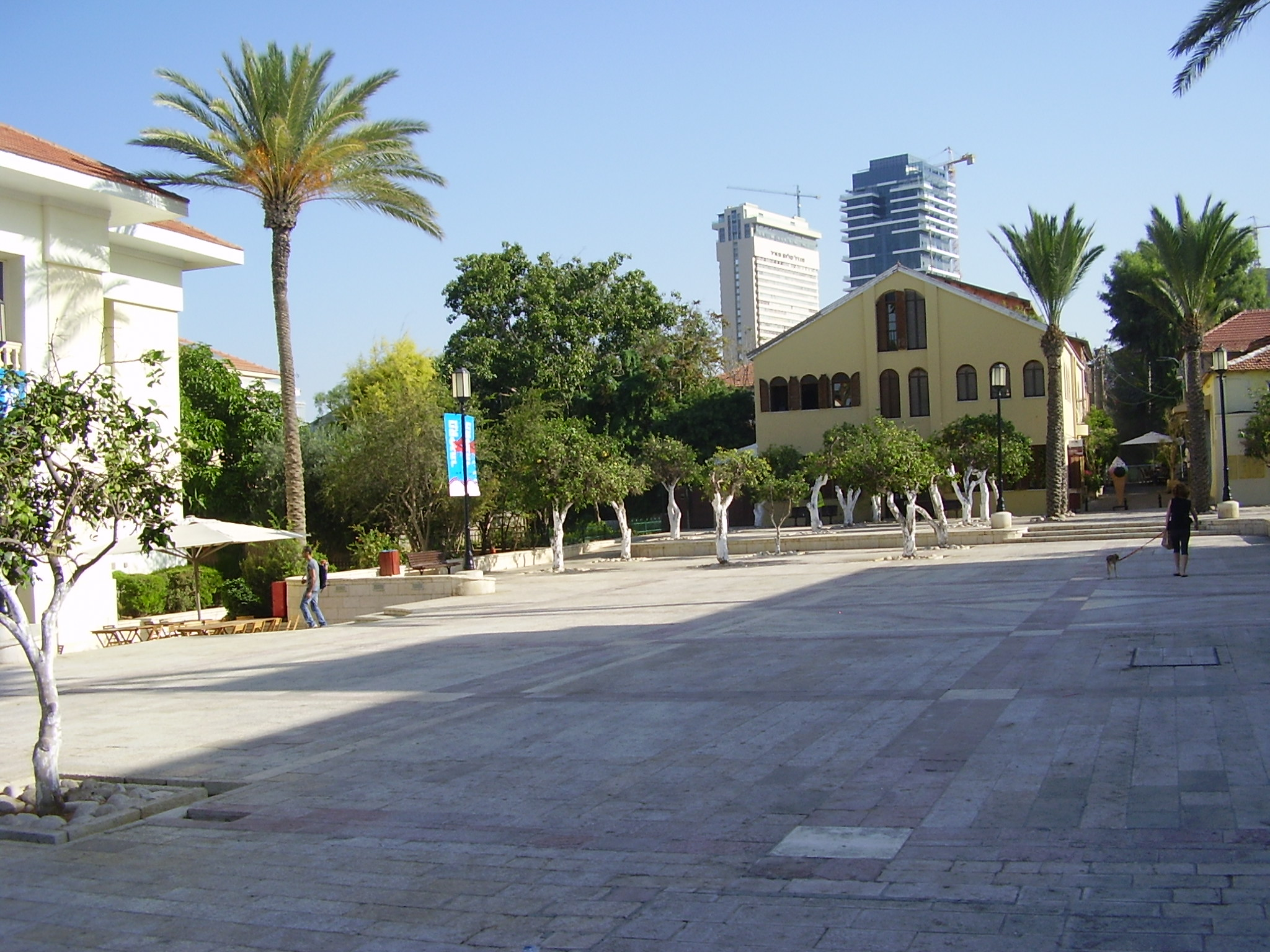
A video postcard introduced Carousel's performance in the first semi-final of the Eurovision Song Contest 2019. The postcard was filmed at the Suzanne Dellal Centre for Dance in Tel Aviv and featured Carousel performing a themed dance.

According to Eurovision rules, all nations with the exceptions of the host country and the "Big Five" (France, Germany, Italy, Spain and the United Kingdom) are required to qualify from one of two semi-finals in order to compete for the final; the top ten countries from each semi-final progress to the final. The European Broadcasting Union (EBU) split up the competing countries into six different pots based on voting patterns from previous contests, with countries with favourable voting histories put into the same pot. On 28 January 2019, a special allocation draw was held which placed each country into one of the two semi-finals, as well as which half of the show they would perform in. Latvia was placed into the second semi-final, to be held on 16 May 2019, and was scheduled to perform in the first half of the show.

Once all the competing songs for the 2019 contest had been released, the running order for the semi-finals was decided by the shows' producers rather than through another draw, so that similar songs were not placed next to each other. Latvia was set to perform in position 5, following the entry from Switzerland and before the entry from Romania.

The two semi-finals and the final were broadcast in Latvia on LTV1 with all shows featuring commentary by Toms Grēviņš and Ketija Šēnberga. The Latvian spokesperson, who announced the top 12-point score awarded by the Latvian jury during the final, was Laura Rizzotto.

=== Semi-final ===
Carousel took part in technical rehearsals on 6 and 10 May, followed by dress rehearsals on 15 and 16 May. This included the jury show on 15 May where the professional juries of each country watched and voted on the competing entries.

The Latvian performance featured the members of Carousel performing on stage in a band set-up dressed in outfits designed by Latvian designers Līga Banga and Ksenia Danilova. The LED screens transitioned from dark tones to lighter hues including floating yellow bubbles and ultimately a bright orange sun. The staging directors for the Latvian performance were Filip Adamo and Rennie Mirro. Carousel were joined by two backing vocalists: Annemarija Moiseja and Zane Biķe-Slišāne.

At the end of the show, Latvia was not announced among the top 10 entries in the second semi-final and therefore failed to qualify to compete in the final. It was later revealed that Latvia placed fifteenth in the semi-final, receiving a total of 50 points: 13 points from the televoting and 37 points from the juries.

=== Voting ===
Voting during the three shows involved each country awarding two sets of points from 1-8, 10 and 12: one from their professional jury and the other from televoting. Each nation's jury consisted of five music industry professionals who are citizens of the country they represent, with their names published before the contest to ensure transparency. This jury judged each entry based on: vocal capacity; the stage performance; the song's composition and originality; and the overall impression by the act. In addition, no member of a national jury was permitted to be related in any way to any of the competing acts in such a way that they cannot vote impartially and independently. The individual rankings of each jury member as well as the nation's televoting results were released shortly after the grand final.

Below is a breakdown of points awarded to Latvia and awarded by Latvia in the second semi-final and grand final of the contest, and the breakdown of the jury voting and televoting conducted during the two shows:

==== Points awarded to Latvia ====
Points awarded to Latvia (Semi-final 2)
Score	Televote	Jury
12 points	Lithuania	
10 points		
8 points		
7 points		Lithuania; Switzerland
6 points		Denmark
5 points		Azerbaijan; Italy
4 points		
3 points		Armenia; North Macedonia
2 points		
1 point	Moldova	Norway

==== Points awarded by Latvia ====
Points awarded by Latvia (Semi-final 2)
Score	Televote	Jury
12 points	Russia	Sweden
10 points	Lithuania	Azerbaijan
8 points	Norway	Netherlands
7 points	Netherlands	Denmark
6 points	Azerbaijan	Lithuania
5 points	Denmark	North Macedonia
4 points	Sweden	Malta
3 points	Switzerland	Russia
2 points	Malta	Armenia
1 point	Croatia	Austria

Points awarded by Latvia (Final)
Score	Televote	Jury
12 points	Russia	Netherlands
10 points	Estonia	Sweden
8 points	Norway	North Macedonia
7 points	Iceland	Denmark
6 points	Australia	Azerbaijan
5 points	Netherlands	Estonia
4 points	Azerbaijan	Russia
3 points	Italy	Czech Republic
2 points	Slovenia	Italy
1 point	Switzerland	Malta

==== Detailed voting results ====
The following members comprised the Latvian jury:

- Rūdolfs Budze (DJ Rudd; jury chairperson) – head of music department, DJ, producer, songwriter
- Zigfrīds Muktupāvels – singer, instrumentalist, violinist, represented Latvia in the 2007 contest as member of Bonaparti.lv
- Aldis Hofmanis – music manager
- Ilze Jansone – producer
- Adriana Miglāne – singer, songwriter

Detailed voting results from Latvia (Semi-final 2)
R/O	Country	Jury							Televote	
R/O	Country	Z. Muktupavels	DJ Rudd	A. Hofmanis	I. Jansone	A. Miglane	Rank	Points	Rank	Points
01	Armenia	16	13	14	13	2	9	2	11	
02	Ireland	5	16	12	16	13	12		15	
03	Moldova	11	12	9	9	14	13		16	
04	Switzerland	9	11	17	11	10	14		8	3
05	Latvia									
06	Romania	17	9	11	14	17	15		14	
07	Denmark	6	8	3	8	3	4	7	6	5
08	Sweden	1	1	5	1	1	1	12	7	4
09	Austria	10	10	15	4	15	10	1	17	
10	Croatia	15	14	8	15	16	16		10	1
11	Malta	13	5	2	10	9	7	4	9	2
12	Lithuania	7	4	7	5	4	5	6	2	10
13	Russia	8	7	13	6	8	8	3	1	12
14	Albania	12	17	16	17	12	17		13	
15	Norway	14	15	6	12	11	11		3	8
16	Netherlands	4	3	1	3	6	3	8	4	7
17	North Macedonia	3	6	10	7	5	6	5	12	
18	Azerbaijan	2	2	4	2	7	2	10	5	6

Detailed voting results from Latvia (Final)
R/O	Country	Jury							Televote	
R/O	Country	Z. Muktupavels	DJ Rudd	A. Hofmanis	I. Jansone	A. Miglane	Rank	Points	Rank	Points
01	Malta	16	9	4	17	10	10	1	19	
02	Albania	11	22	23	25	16	20		22	
03	Czech Republic	6	16	16	4	17	8	3	15	
04	Germany	10	19	18	24	14	18		24	
05	Russia	18	7	14	5	5	7	4	1	12
06	Denmark	3	11	2	6	3	4	7	11	
07	San Marino	15	13	5	15	9	11		16	
08	North Macedonia	1	5	3	7	2	3	8	17	
09	Sweden	2	2	11	3	1	2	10	12	
10	Slovenia	19	20	24	14	23	22		9	2
11	Cyprus	21	8	22	16	11	15		21	
12	Netherlands	5	1	1	1	4	1	12	6	5
13	Greece	26	26	26	26	25	26		25	
14	Israel	20	25	13	22	24	23		18	
15	Norway	12	23	6	11	20	12		3	8
16	United Kingdom	14	21	17	23	19	21		26	
17	Iceland	24	17	10	10	26	17		4	7
18	Estonia	4	4	9	8	7	6	5	2	10
19	Belarus	13	12	20	18	18	19		13	
20	Azerbaijan	7	3	7	2	6	5	6	7	4
21	France	8	15	19	21	12	14		14	
22	Italy	9	6	8	12	13	9	2	8	3
23	Serbia	23	10	12	13	8	13		23	
24	Switzerland	25	18	21	19	21	24		10	1
25	Australia	17	14	15	9	15	16		5	6
26	Spain	22	24	25	20	22	25		20	
