= Eurovision Song Contest 2019 =

International song competition

- Dare to Dream

Dates and venue
- Semi-final 1: 14 May 2019
- Semi-final 2: 16 May 2019
- Final: 18 May 2019
- Venue: Expo Tel Aviv (Pavilion 2); Tel Aviv, Israel

Organisation
- Organiser: European Broadcasting Union (EBU)
- Executive supervisor: Jon Ola Sand

Production
- Host broadcaster: Israeli Public Broadcasting Corporation (IPBC/Kan)
- Directors: Amir Ukrainitz; Sivan Magazanik; Yuval Cohen
- Executive producer: Zivit Davidovich
- Presenters: Erez Tal; Bar Refaeli; Assi Azar; Lucy Ayoub

Participants
- Number of entries: 41
- Number of finalists: 26
- Non-returning countries: Bulgaria; Ukraine
- Participation map: Finalist countries Countries eliminated in the semi-finals Countries that participated in the past but not in 2019

Vote
- Voting system: Each country awards two sets of 12, 10, 8–1 points to ten songs.
- Winning song: Netherlands "Arcade"

The Eurovision Song Contest 2019 was the 64th edition of the Eurovision Song Contest. It consisted of two semi-finals on 14 and 16 May and a final on 18 May 2019, held at Expo Tel Aviv in Tel Aviv, Israel, and presented by Erez Tal, Assi Azar, Lucy Ayoub, and Bar Refaeli. It was organised by the European Broadcasting Union (EBU) and host broadcaster the Israeli Public Broadcasting Corporation (IPBC/Kan), which staged the event after winning the 2018 contest for Israel with the song "Toy" by Netta.

Broadcasters from forty-one countries participated in the contest, with Bulgaria and Ukraine not returning after their participation in the previous edition. Bulgarian National Television (BNT) cited financial difficulties as the reason for its absence, while the Public Broadcasting Company of Ukraine (UA:PBC), which had originally planned to participate, ultimately withdrew as a result of a controversy surrounding its national selection.

The winner was the Netherlands with the song "Arcade", performed by Duncan Laurence and written by Laurence along with Joel Sjöö, Wouter Hardy and Will Knox. Italy, Russia, Switzerland, and Sweden rounded out the top five; due to a voting error, Norway was originally placed fifth, but placed sixth after a correction. The Netherlands won the combined vote, but placed third in the jury vote after North Macedonia and Sweden, and second in the televote after Norway. Further down the table, North Macedonia and San Marino achieved their best results to date, finishing seventh and 19th respectively.

The EBU reported that the contest had an audience of 182 million viewers in 40 European markets, a decrease of four million viewers from the previous edition. However, an increase of two percent in the 15–24 year old age range was reported. The lead-up to the contest was met with controversy on multiple fronts, primarily on issues surrounding the Israeli–Palestinian conflict, eventually leading to demonstrations by interval act performer Madonna and Icelandic entrants Hatari during the broadcast of the final.

== Location ==
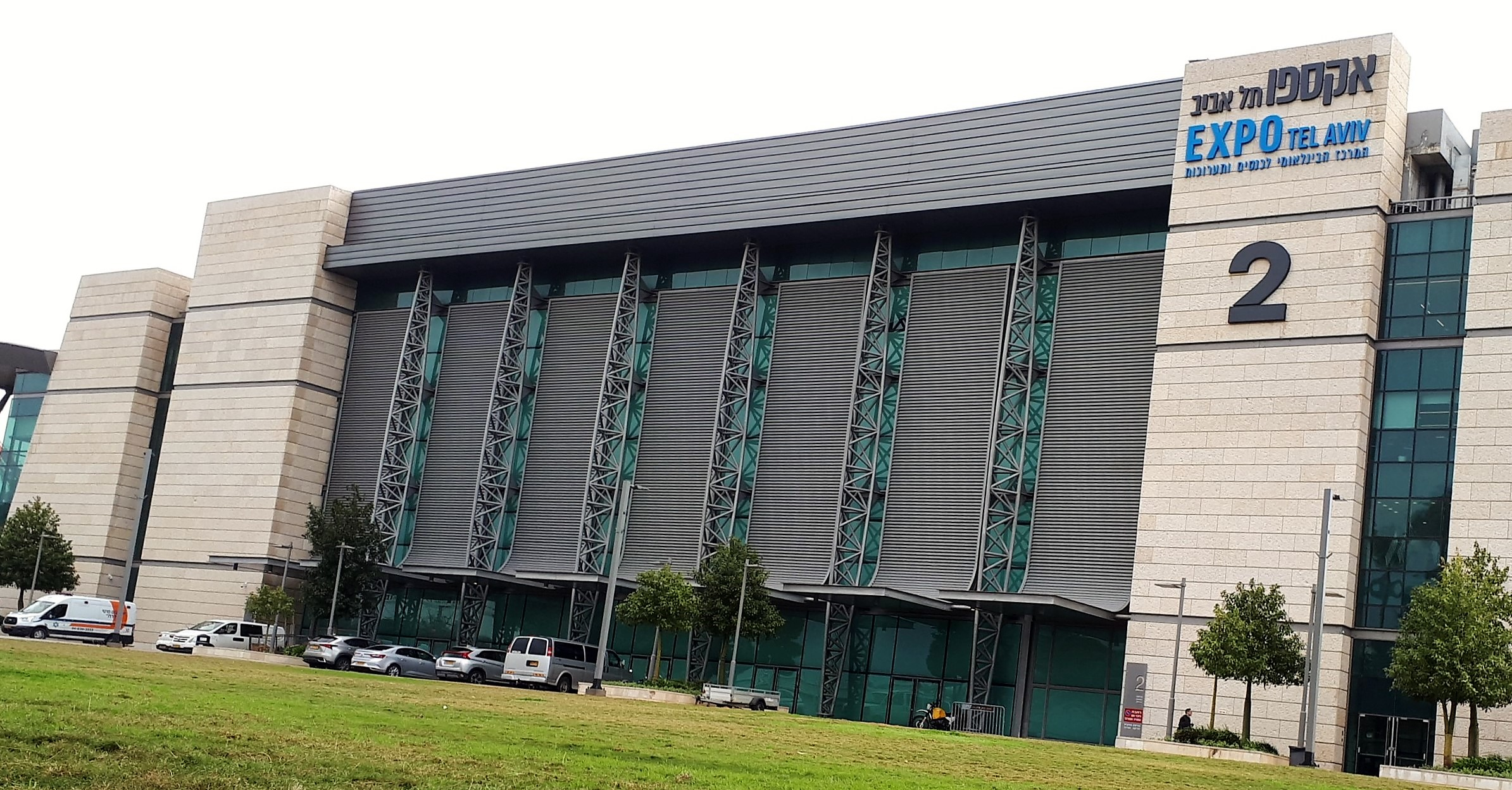
Expo Tel Aviv (Pavilion 2) – host venue of the 2019 contest

The Israeli Public Broadcasting Corporation (IPBC/Kan) staged the 2019 contest in Tel Aviv, after winning the 2018 contest for Israel with the song "Toy" performed by Netta. It was the third time that the contest was held in Israel, after the 1979 and 1999 contests in Jerusalem. The selected venue was Expo Tel Aviv's 7,300-seat congress and convention centre in "Bitan 2" (Pavilion 2), which was opened in January 2015. Located on Rokach Boulevard in northern Tel Aviv, the convention centre serves as a venue for many events, including concerts, exhibitions, trade fairs, and conferences. The fairground has ten halls and pavilions, plus a large outdoor space. The new pavilion had recently hosted the 2018 European Judo Championships from 26 to 28 April.

=== Bidding phase ===
Locations of the candidate cities: the chosen host city is marked in blue. The shortlisted cities are marked in green, while the eliminated cities are marked in red.

After Netta's win in the 2018 contest, both she and the Israeli prime minister Benjamin Netanyahu expressed confidence that the 2019 contest could be held in Jerusalem. Israeli finance minister Moshe Kahlon also said in an interview that the event would be held solely in Jerusalem and estimated its cost at 120 million Israeli new shekels (approximately €29 million). The mayor of Jerusalem, Nir Barkat, mentioned Pais Arena and Teddy Stadium as possible venues to host the event. The municipality of Jerusalem confirmed that because it lacked the seating capacity, the contest would not be held at the International Convention Centre, which had hosted the contest in 1979 and 1999. The event organisers, the European Broadcasting Union (EBU) and incoming host broadcaster Kan, made no comment on the matter.

The EBU had allowed Kan to participate in the 2018 contest without having yet become a full member of the union, while its membership application was being reviewed. On 18 June 2018, Netanyahu stated that the Israeli government had committed to remaining in compliance with EBU rules regarding the constitution of member broadcasters, so as not to affect Kan's right to host the 2019 contest; the broadcaster's establishment included a condition that news programming would be delegated later to a second public broadcasting entity, which would have violated EBU rules requiring member broadcasters to have their own internal news departments. The following day, Kan was officially confirmed as the host broadcaster for 2019, and on 24 June, it formally opened the bidding process for cities interested in hosting the event. Israeli deputy minister Michael Oren stated to Malta's TVM that Jerusalem did not have the resources to host the contest on 28 July, reiterating that Tel Aviv was the more likely host. Oren also indicated that hosting the contest in Tel Aviv would "solve the whole problem"; TVM interpreted this as a nod to the disputed status of Jerusalem, with both Israel and Palestine claiming the city as their capital.

Soon afterwards, reports surfaced of the government not providing the €12 million downpayment requested by Kan to cover hosting expenses and security. Following a tense back-and-forth between Kan and the government, a compromise between the two parties was reached on 29 July 2018 that would see Kan paying the €12 million to the EBU and the Finance Ministry covering expenses should complications arise. The mayor of Tel Aviv, Ron Huldai, stated that the city would be willing to pay for the convention centre itself, should it be chosen as the host city.

In the week of 27 August 2018, executive supervisor Jon Ola Sand led a handful of EBU delegates around Israel to look at potential venues in Jerusalem and Tel Aviv and to hear the bid from Eilat. On 30 August, Sand stated in an interview with Kan that Eilat was no longer in the running to host, leaving Jerusalem and Tel Aviv as the remaining cities in the running. He added that there was no serious discussion among EBU members about boycotting the event. On 13 September, the EBU announced Tel Aviv as the host city, with Expo Tel Aviv as the chosen venue for the 2019 contest. On 7 December, the EBU General Assembly approved Kan's membership application.

Key: † Host venue ‡ Shortlisted venues

| City | Venue | Notes |
|---|---|---|
| Eilat | Hangars on the port | Proposal intended to connect two hangars to a hall, in order to meet the EBU's capacity and venue requirements. |
| Haifa | Sammy Ofer Stadium | Candidacy had been dependent on the construction of a roof. |
| Jerusalem | Pais Arena ‡ | Indoor arena similar to the venues of recent contests. It was Jerusalem's preferred venue, in case it was chosen to be the host city. |
| Jerusalem | Teddy Stadium | Candidacy had been dependent on the construction of a roof. |
| Tel Aviv | Expo Tel Aviv (Pavilion 2) † | The IPBC expected Pavilion 2 to have room for up to 9,000 attendees, while an additional 1,500 fans will be able to gather in the greenroom. |

=== Other sites ===
Location of host venue (red) and other contest-related sites and events (blue)

Located at the Charles Clore Park in Tel Aviv, the Eurovision Village was the official Eurovision Song Contest fan and sponsors' area during the events week. It was open from 12 to 18 May 2019. There it was possible to watch performances by local artists, as well as the live shows broadcast from the main venue.

The EuroClub was located at Hangar 11 in Tel Aviv Port and was the venue for the official after-parties and private performances by contest participants. Unlike the Eurovision Village, access to the EuroClub was restricted to accredited fans, delegates, and press.

The "Orange Carpet" event, where the contestants and their delegations are presented before the accredited press and fans, took place at Habima Square in central Tel Aviv on 12 May 2019, followed by the Opening Ceremony at the Charles Bronfman Auditorium.

== Participants ==
Eurovision Song Contest 2019 – Participation summaries by country
- Albania; Armenia; Australia; Austria; Azerbaijan; Belarus; Belgium; Croatia; Cyprus; Czech Republic; Denmark; Estonia; Finland; France; Georgia; Germany; Greece; Hungary; Iceland; Ireland; Israel; Italy; Latvia; Lithuania; Malta; Moldova; Montenegro; Netherlands; North Macedonia; Norway; Poland; Portugal; Romania; Russia; San Marino; Serbia; Slovenia; Spain; Sweden; Switzerland; ~~Ukraine~~; United Kingdom

Eligibility for potential participation in the Eurovision Song Contest requires a national broadcaster with active EBU membership capable of receiving the contest via the Eurovision network and broadcasting it live nationwide. The EBU issued an invitation to participate in the contest to all active member broadcasters. The Israeli communications minister, Ayoob Kara, expressed interest in inviting other countries from the MENA region with which Israel either have tense or no diplomatic relations. He specifically named Tunisia, Saudi Arabia, and the United Arab Emirates. The EBU member in Tunisia is eligible to participate and is already invited every year, but has never participated in the contest, (Note: Tunisia had planned to participate in 1977, but withdrew before the contest.) while the national broadcasters of the Gulf states do not have EBU membership, which made them ineligible to participate.

The EBU initially announced on 7 November 2018 that broadcasters from 42 countries would participate in the contest, with Bulgarian National Television (BNT) representing Bulgaria opting not to participate due to financial reasons and to allow members of the delegation to moving onto other projects. The Public Broadcasting Company of Ukraine (UA:PBC) representing Ukraine announced its withdrawal from the contest on 27 February 2019 as a result of a controversy surrounding its national selection, thereby reducing the number of participants to 41.

On 6 March 2019, the EBU confirmed that North Macedonia would take part for the first time under its new name, instead of the previous name of Former Yugoslav Republic of Macedonia (F.Y.R. Macedonia) which had been used since the country's debut in 1998.

The contest featured five representatives who had performed previously as lead vocalists for the same countries. Two of them participated in 2016—Sergey Lazarev represented Russia, while Serhat represented San Marino. Joci Pápai represented Hungary in 2017. Tamara Todevska represented Macedonia in 2008 alongside Vrčak and Adrian, and provided backing vocals in 2004 and 2014 for Toše Proeski and Tijana Dapčević, respectively. Nevena Božović represented Serbia in 2013 as part of Moje 3, and also represented Serbia in the Junior Eurovision Song Contest 2007. The contest also featured a former backing vocalist representing his country for the first time—Jurij Veklenko provided backing for Lithuania in 2013 and 2015.

On the other hand, previous representatives returned to provide supporting vocals for their own or another country. Mikheil Javakhishvili, who represented Georgia in 2018 as part of Ethno-Jazz Band Iriao, backed Oto Nemsadze. Mikel Hennet, who represented Spain in 2007 as part of D'Nash, backed Miki. Stig Rästa, who represented Estonia in 2015 alongside Elina Born, backed Victor Crone. Mladen Lukić, who represented Serbia in 2018 as part of Balkanika, backed Nevena Božović. Sahlene, who represented Estonia in 2002, and provided backing for her native country Sweden in 1999, for Malta in 2000 and for Australia in 2016, backed for the United Kingdom this time. Jacques Houdek, who represented Croatia in 2017, backed Roko. Émilie Satt, who represented France in 2018 as part of Madame Monsieur, backed Bilal Hassani. Destiny Chukunyere, who won the Junior Eurovision Song Contest 2015 for Malta, backed Michela.

Eurovision Song Contest 2019 participants
| Country | Broadcaster | Artist | Song | Language | Songwriter(s) |
|---|---|---|---|---|---|
| Albania | RTSH | Jonida Maliqi | "Ktheju tokës" | Albanian | Eriona Rushiti |
| Armenia | AMPTV | Srbuk | "Walking Out" | English | Lost Capital; Garik Papoyan; Tokionine |
| Australia | SBS | Kate Miller-Heidke | "Zero Gravity" | English | Julian Hamilton; Kate Miller-Heidke; Keir Nuttall |
| Austria | ORF | Paenda | "Limits" | English | Paenda |
| Azerbaijan | İTV | Chingiz | "Truth" | English | Bo J; Trey Campbell; Chingiz; Pablo Dinero; Hostess; Borislav Milanov |
| Belarus | BTRC | Zena | "Like It" | English | Victor Drobysh; Yuliya Kireyeva |
| Belgium | RTBF | Eliot | "Wake Up" | English | Pierre Dumoulin; Eliot Vassamillet |
| Croatia | HRT | Roko | "The Dream" | English, Croatian | Andrea Čubrić; Jacques Houdek; Charlie Mason |
| Cyprus | CyBC | Tamta | "Replay" | English | Kristoffer Fogelmark; Albin Nedler; Alex Papaconstantinou; Teddy Sky; Viktor Svensson |
| Czech Republic | ČT | Lake Malawi | "Friend of a Friend" | English | Albert Černý; Jan Steinsdoerfer; Mikołaj Maciej Trybulec |
| Denmark | DR | Leonora | "Love Is Forever" | English, French, Danish | Lise Cabble; Emil Lei; Melanie Wehbe |
| Estonia | ERR | Victor Crone | "Storm" | English | Victor Crone; Vallo Kikas; Fred Krieger; Sebastian Lestapier; Stig Rästa |
| Finland | Yle | Darude feat. Sebastian Rejman | "Look Away" | English | Sebastian Rejman; Ville Virtanen |
| France | France Télévisions | Bilal Hassani | "Roi" | French, English | Bilal Hassani; Madame Monsieur |
| Georgia | GPB | Oto Nemsadze | "Keep On Going" | Georgian | Diana Giorgadze; Roma Giorgadze |
| Germany | NDR (Note: On behalf of the German public broadcasting consortium ARD) | Sisters | "Sister" | English | Laurell Barker; Marine Kaltenbacher; Tom Oehler; Thomas Stengaard |
| Greece | ERT | Katerine Duska | "Better Love" | English | Phil Cook; Katerine Duska; Leon of Athens; David Sneddon |
| Hungary | MTVA | Joci Pápai | "Az én apám" | Hungarian | Ferenc Molnár; Joci Pápai |
| Iceland | RÚV | Hatari | "Hatrið mun sigra" | Icelandic | Hatari |
| Ireland | RTÉ | Sarah McTernan | "22" | English | Janieck van de Polder; Roel Rats; Marcia Sondeijker |
| Israel | IPBC | Kobi Marimi | "Home" | English | Ohad Shragai; Inbar Wizman |
| Italy | RAI | Mahmood | "Soldi" | Italian | Charlie Charles; Dardust; Mahmood |
| Latvia | LTV | Carousel | "That Night" | English | Mārcis Vasiļevskis; Sabīne Žuga |
| Lithuania | LRT | Jurij Veklenko | "Run with the Lions" | English | Ashley Hicklin; Pele Loriano; Eric Lumiere |
| Malta | PBS | Michela | "Chameleon" | English | Johan Alkenäs; Borislav Milanov; Joacim Persson; Paula Winger |
| Moldova | TRM | Anna Odobescu | "Stay" | English | Maria Broberg; Georgios Kalpakidis; Jeppe Reil; Thomas Reil |
| Montenegro | RTCG | D mol | "Heaven" | English | Dejan Božović; Adis Eminić |
| Netherlands | AVROTROS | Duncan Laurence | "Arcade" | English | Wouter Hardy; Will Knox; Duncan Laurence; Joel Sjöö |
| North Macedonia | MRT | Tamara Todevska | "Proud" | English | Robert Bilbilov; Lazar Cvetkoski; Darko Dimitrov; Kosta Petrov; Sanja Popovska |
| Norway | NRK | Keiino | "Spirit in the Sky" | English, Northern Sámi | Fred Buljo; Tom Hugo; Alexander Olsson; Alexandra Rotan; Rüdiger Schramm; Henrik Tala |
| Poland | TVP | Tulia | "Fire of Love (Pali się)" | Polish, English | Nadia Dalin; Jude Friedman; Sonia Krasny; Allan Rich |
| Portugal | RTP | Conan Osíris | "Telemóveis" | Portuguese | Conan Osíris |
| Romania | TVR | Ester Peony | "On a Sunday" | English | Ioana Victoria Badea; Ester Alexandra Creţu; Alexandru Şerbu |
| Russia | RTR | Sergey Lazarev | "Scream" | English | Dimitris Kontopoulos; Sharon Vaughn |
| San Marino | SMRTV | Serhat | "Say Na Na Na" | English | Mary Susan Applegate; Serhat |
| Serbia | RTS | Nevena Božović | "Kruna" (Круна) | Serbian | Nevena Božović; Darko Dimitrov |
| Slovenia | RTVSLO | Zala Kralj and Gašper Šantl | "Sebi" | Slovene | Zala Kralj; Gašper Šantl |
| Spain | RTVE | Miki | "La venda" | Spanish | Adrià Salas |
| Sweden | SVT | John Lundvik | "Too Late for Love" | English | John Lundvik; Andreas Stone Johansson; Anderz Wrethov |
| Switzerland | SRG SSR | Luca Hänni | "She Got Me" | English | Laurell Barker; Jon Hällgren; Lukas Hällgren; Luca Hänni; Mac Frazer |
| United Kingdom | BBC | Michael Rice | "Bigger than Us" | English | Laurell Barker; Anna-Klara Folin; John Lundvik; Jonas Thander |

=== Other countries ===
==== Active EBU members ====
Active EBU member broadcasters in Andorra, Bosnia and Herzegovina, Slovakia, and Turkey confirmed non-participation prior to the announcement of the participants list by the EBU.

==== Associate EBU members ====
In late 2017, claims by the Kazakh Ministry of Culture and Sport that Channel 31 had finalised negotiations with the EBU, allowing the country to debut in 2019, were dismissed by the EBU, explaining that they were ineligible due to being located outside the European Broadcasting Area and also not being a member of the Council of Europe. Kazakhstan was later invited to participate in the Junior Eurovision Song Contest 2018, but the EBU stated that the decision was made solely by the Junior Eurovision Steering Group, and there were no current plans to invite associate members to the adult contest; it was then clarified that this could change in the future, though not in 2019.

==== Non-EBU members ====
As of June 2018, Kosovan broadcaster RTK was pushing for full EBU membership in order to be able to take part in the 2019 contest, but the vote to decide would not be held until June 2019. In late 2017, Liechtensteiner broadcaster 1FLTV, confirmed that they were applying for EBU membership in order to debut in the 2019 contest, already planning to select their entry through a national final; however, by mid-2018 1FLTV had not yet applied for membership due to the sudden death of the broadcaster's director, Peter Kölbel.

== Production ==
=== Visual design ===
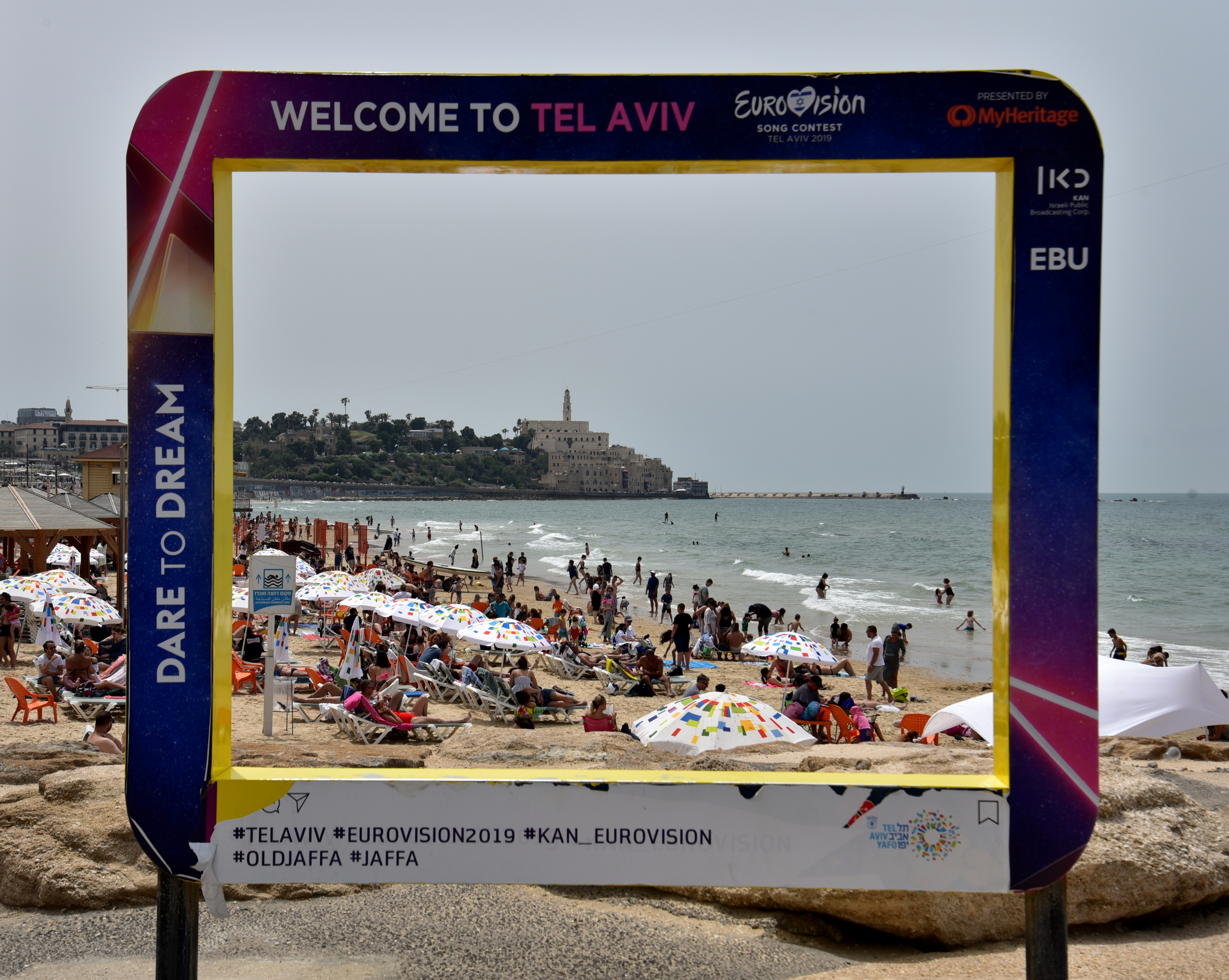
The graphic design of the 2019 contest on display in Tel Aviv

The contest's slogan, "Dare to Dream", was unveiled on 28 October 2018, while the official logo and branding were revealed on 8 January 2019. Designed by Awesome Tel Aviv and Studio Adam Feinberg, it consists of layered triangles designed to resemble a star, reflecting "the stars of the future" coming to Tel Aviv.

=== Stage design ===
The stage design for the 2019 contest was revealed on 27 December 2018 and was designed by German production designer Florian Wieder, who also devised the stage concepts for the 2011–12, 2015 and 2017–18 contests. Inspired by the Star of David, the diamond-shaped stage was 250 m^{2} (2,700 sq ft), with 130 overhead LED triangles, two 25 metres (82 ft) runways with connecting bridges and a 36 by 12 metres (118 ft × 39 ft) LED wall composed of 12 rotational vertical screens symbolising the Twelve Tribes of Israel. Unlike in previous years, the green room was placed in a separate building to the main performance venue due to limited capacity. Following the contest, Wieder was accused of plagiarism by German design studio Whitevoid for similarities to a stage designed for Brazilian singer Luan Santana in 2014.

=== Postcards ===
Filmed between March and April 2019, and directed by Keren Hochma, the 2019 postcards involved the act travelling to a location in Israel that resembles that of their own country. An imaginary play button circled above the act's head, and, when the act pressed it, they performed a themed dance and threw the play button towards the screen, afterwards, it "flies over" to the stage where the ceiling lit up with their country's flag using augmented reality. The dances in each postcard were wide-ranging and included parkour, ballet and street dance, among other styles. The following locations were used:

- Albania – Banias Nature Reserve
- Armenia – Masada National Park
- Australia – Jaffa
- Austria – Bauhaus Center Tel Aviv
- Azerbaijan – Gan HaShlosha National Park
- Belarus – Rockefeller Archaeological Museum, Jerusalem
- Belgium – Mitzpe Ramon
- Croatia – The Israel Museum, Jerusalem
- Cyprus – Eilat
- Czech Republic – Caesarea
- Denmark – Jerusalem International YMCA
- Estonia – Tel Aviv Promenade
- Finland – Diamond Exchange District, Ramat Gan
- France – Tel Aviv Museum of Art
- Georgia – Acre
- Germany – Sea of Galilee
- Greece – Van Leer Institute, Jerusalem
- Hungary – Beit Guvrin National Park
- Iceland – Beit She'an National Park
- Ireland – Palm plantation, Eilot
- Israel – Old City of Jerusalem
- Italy – Ashdod Port
- Latvia – Suzanne Dellal Center for Dance and Theater, Tel Aviv
- Lithuania – HaBonim beach
- Malta – Timna Park
- Moldova – Zichron Yaakov wineries
- Montenegro – Mikhmoret beach
- Netherlands – Mount Arbel
- North Macedonia – Mount Carmel National Park
- Norway – Judean Desert
- Poland – Mishkenot Sha'ananim, Jerusalem
- Portugal – Dead Sea
- Romania – Mount Hermon
- Russia – Tower of David, Jerusalem
- San Marino – Ashalim Power Station, Ashalim
- Serbia – Cherry Blossom, Ein Zivan
- Slovenia – Ruhama badlands
- Spain – Haifa
- Sweden – Tel Aviv Port
- Switzerland – Charles Bronfman Auditorium, Tel Aviv
- United Kingdom – Baháʼí World Centre, Haifa

=== Presenters ===
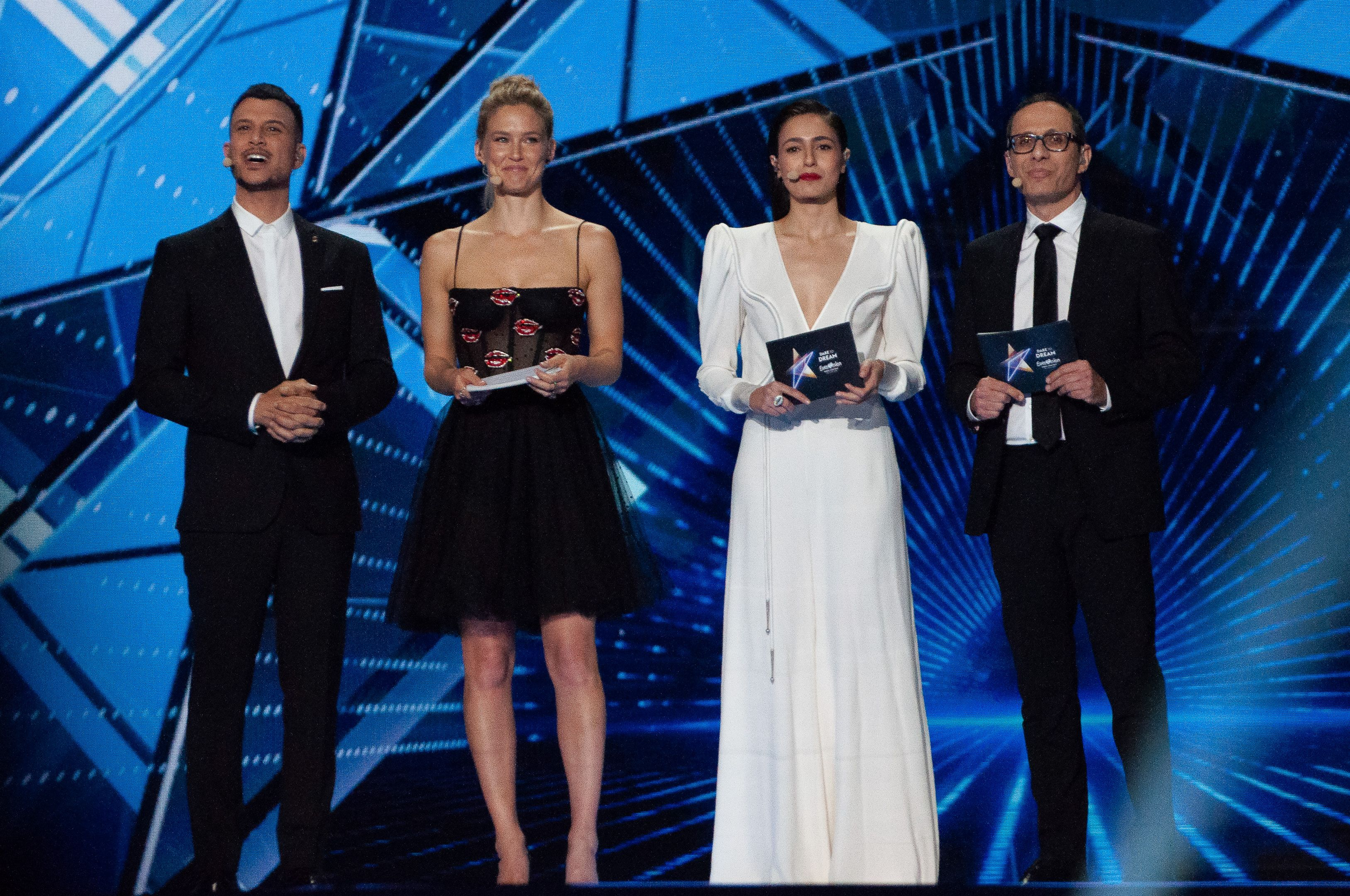
Presenters from left to right: Assi Azar, Bar Refaeli, Lucy Ayoub, and Erez Tal, Tel Aviv, 16 May 2019

On 25 January 2019, Kan announced that four presenters would host the contest: television hosts Erez Tal (who was also one of the Israeli commentators for the 2018 final), Assi Azar (who worked for the Israeli Channel 12), Lucy Ayoub (who was also the Israeli jury spokesperson at the 2018 contest), and model Bar Refaeli. Tal and Refaeli were the main hosts, while Azar and Ayoub additionally hosted the green room.

== Format ==
=== Voting presentation ===
On 30 March 2019, the EBU announced that the presentation of the televoting results during the final would change for the first time since the current voting system was introduced in 2016. The jury results' presentation remained the same with the spokesperson of each participating broadcaster revealing live the top song from their national jury that earned 12 points. In a change from previous years, the televoting result was revealed in the order of jury ranking, from the lowest to the highest.

=== Semi-final allocation draw ===
Results of the semi-final allocation draw Participating countries in the first semi-final (Note: Ukraine, which had originally been allocated into semi-final 1, withdrew from the contest in February 2019.) Pre-qualified for the final but also voting in the first semi-final Participating countries in the second semi-final Pre-qualified for the final but also voting in the second semi-final

The draw to determine the participating countries' semi-finals took place on 28 January 2019 at 18:00 IST (17:00 CET), at the Tel Aviv Museum of Art. The thirty-six semi-finalists were divided over six pots, based on historical voting patterns as calculated by the contest's official televoting partner Digame. The purpose of drawing from different pots was to reduce the chance of "bloc voting" and to increase suspense in the semi-finals. The draw also determined which semi-final each of the six automatic qualifiers – host country Israel and "Big Five" countries France, Germany, Italy, Spain and the United Kingdom – would broadcast and vote in. The ceremony was hosted by contest presenters Assi Azar and Lucy Ayoub, and included the passing of the host city insignia from Duarte Cordeiro, vice mayor of previous host city Lisbon, to Ron Huldai, mayor of Tel Aviv.

| Pot 1 | Pot 2 | Pot 3 | Pot 4 | Pot 5 | Pot 6 |
|---|---|---|---|---|---|
| Albania; Croatia; Montenegro; North Macedonia; Serbia; Slovenia | Denmark; Estonia; Finland; Iceland; Norway; Sweden | Armenia; Azerbaijan; Belarus; Georgia; Russia; ~~Ukraine~~ | Australia; Ireland; Latvia; Lithuania; Poland; Portugal | Austria; Belgium; Czech Republic; Hungary; Netherlands; Switzerland (Note: Switzerland, which had been allocated to pot five, was pre-allocated to compete in the second semi-final at the request of Swiss broadcaster SRF.) | Cyprus; Greece; Malta; Moldova; Romania; San Marino |

== Contest overview ==
=== Semi-final 1 ===
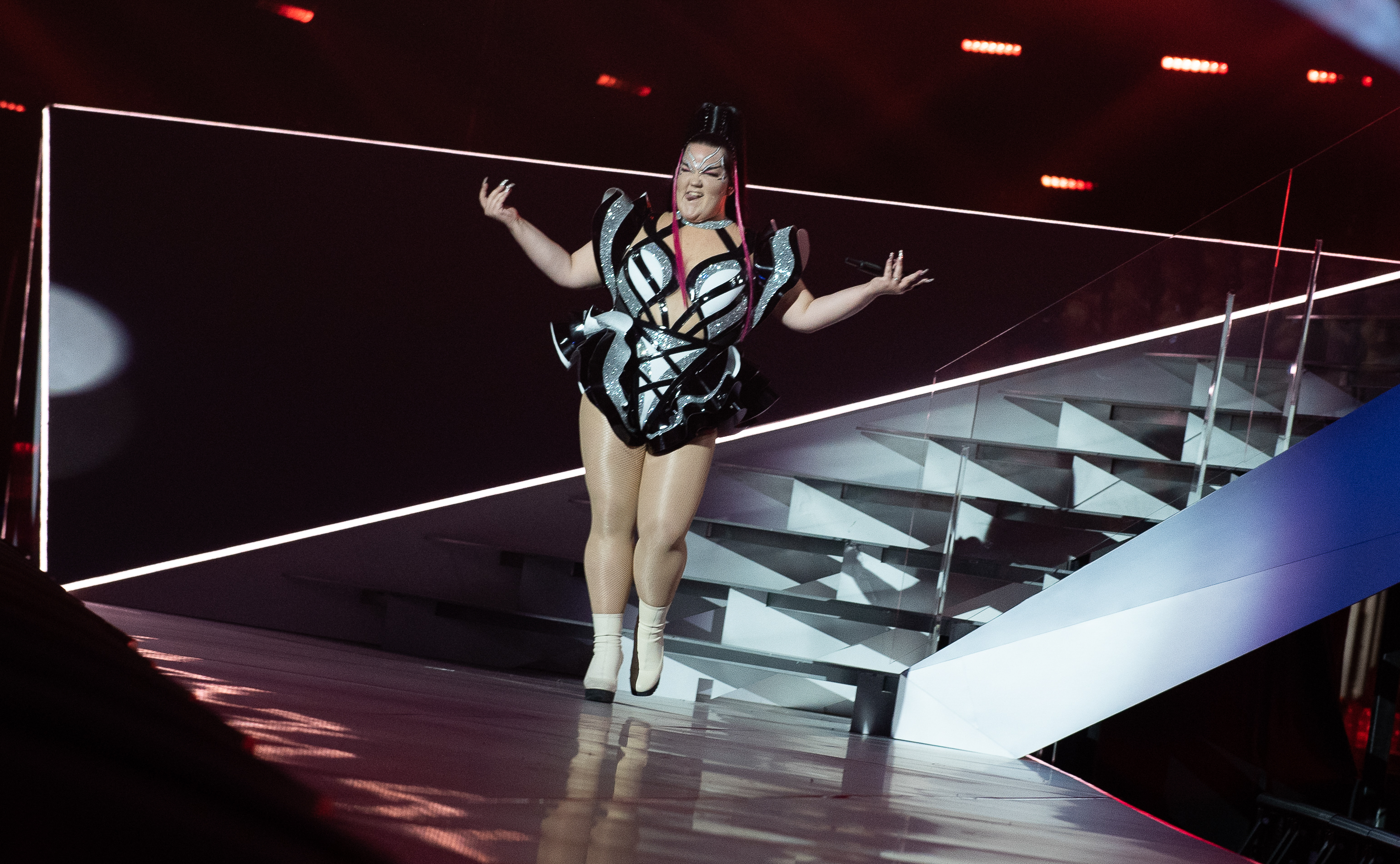
Netta opened the first semi-final with a new version of "Toy", the song with which she won for Israel the previous year.

The first semi-final took place on 14 May 2019 at 22:00 IDT (21:00 CEST). Seventeen countries participated in the first semi-final. Ukraine was originally allocated to participate in the second half of the semi-final, but withdrew from the contest due to controversy over its national selection. Australia won the most points, followed by the Czech Republic, Iceland, Estonia, Greece, Slovenia, Serbia, San Marino, Cyprus, and Belarus. The countries that failed to reach the final were Poland, Hungary, Belgium, Georgia, Portugal, Montenegro, and Finland. All the countries competing in this semi-final were eligible to vote, plus France, Israel and Spain.

This semi-final was opened by Netta performing a new version of her winning song in 2018, "Toy", while the interval act was Dana International performing "Just the Way You Are". The French, Israeli and Spanish artists were then interviewed, and clips of their competing songs were played.

Qualifiers

Results of the first semi-final of the Eurovision Song Contest 2019
| R/O | Country | Artist | Song | Points | Place |
|---|---|---|---|---|---|
| 1 | Cyprus | Tamta | "Replay" | 149 | 9 |
| 2 | Montenegro | D mol | "Heaven" | 46 | 16 |
| 3 | Finland | Darude feat. Sebastian Rejman | "Look Away" | 23 | 17 |
| 4 | Poland | Tulia | "Fire of Love (Pali się)" | 120 | 11 |
| 5 | Slovenia | Zala Kralj and Gašper Šantl | "Sebi" | 167 | 6 |
| 6 | Czech Republic | Lake Malawi | "Friend of a Friend" | 242 | 2 |
| 7 | Hungary | Joci Pápai | "Az én apám" | 97 | 12 |
| 8 | Belarus | Zena | "Like It" | 122 | 10 |
| 9 | Serbia | Nevena Božović | "Kruna" | 156 | 7 |
| 10 | Belgium | Eliot | "Wake Up" | 70 | 13 |
| 11 | Georgia | Oto Nemsadze | "Keep On Going" | 62 | 14 |
| 12 | Australia | Kate Miller-Heidke | "Zero Gravity" | 261 | 1 |
| 13 | Iceland | Hatari | "Hatrið mun sigra" | 221 | 3 |
| 14 | Estonia | Victor Crone | "Storm" | 198 | 4 |
| 15 | Portugal | Conan Osíris | "Telemóveis" | 51 | 15 |
| 16 | Greece | Katerine Duska | "Better Love" | 185 | 5 |
| 17 | San Marino | Serhat | "Say Na Na Na" | 150 | 8 |

=== Semi-final 2 ===
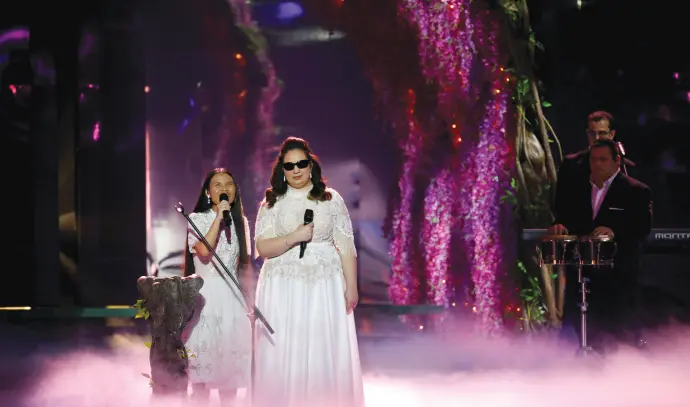
Shalva Band performed as an interval act in the second semi-final.

The second semi-final took place on 16 May 2019 at 22:00 IDT (21:00 CEST). Eighteen countries participated in the second semi-final. Switzerland was pre-drawn into this semi-final due to scheduling issues. The Netherlands won the most points, followed by North Macedonia, Sweden, Switzerland, Azerbaijan, Russia, Norway, Malta, Albania, and Denmark. The countries that failed to reach the final were Lithuania, Moldova, Romania, Croatia, Latvia, Armenia, Austria, and Ireland. All the countries competing in this semi-final were eligible to vote, plus Germany, Italy and the United Kingdom.

This semi-final featured Shalva Band performing "A Million Dreams" and mentalist Lior Suchard as interval acts. The British, German and Italian artists were then interviewed, and clips of their competing songs were played.

Qualifiers

Results of the second semi-final of the Eurovision Song Contest 2019
| R/O | Country | Artist | Song | Points | Place |
|---|---|---|---|---|---|
| 1 | Armenia | Srbuk | "Walking Out" | 49 | 16 |
| 2 | Ireland | Sarah McTernan | "22" | 16 | 18 |
| 3 | Moldova | Anna Odobescu | "Stay" | 85 | 12 |
| 4 | Switzerland | Luca Hänni | "She Got Me" | 232 | 4 |
| 5 | Latvia | Carousel | "That Night" | 50 | 15 |
| 6 | Romania | Ester Peony | "On a Sunday" | 71 | 13 |
| 7 | Denmark | Leonora | "Love Is Forever" | 94 | 10 |
| 8 | Sweden | John Lundvik | "Too Late for Love" | 238 | 3 |
| 9 | Austria | Paenda | "Limits" | 21 | 17 |
| 10 | Croatia | Roko | "The Dream" | 64 | 14 |
| 11 | Malta | Michela | "Chameleon" | 157 | 8 |
| 12 | Lithuania | Jurij Veklenko | "Run with the Lions" | 93 | 11 |
| 13 | Russia | Sergey Lazarev | "Scream" | 217 | 6 |
| 14 | Albania | Jonida Maliqi | "Ktheju tokës" | 96 | 9 |
| 15 | Norway | Keiino | "Spirit in the Sky" | 210 | 7 |
| 16 | Netherlands | Duncan Laurence | "Arcade" | 280 | 1 |
| 17 | North Macedonia | Tamara Todevska | "Proud" | 239 | 2 |
| 18 | Azerbaijan | Chingiz | "Truth" | 224 | 5 |

=== Final ===
The final took place on 18 May 2019 at 22:00 IDT (21:00 CEST). Twenty-six countries participated in the final, with all forty-one participating countries eligible to vote. The running order for the final was published on 17 May 2019. The Netherlands won with 498 points. Italy came second with 472 points, with Russia, Switzerland, Sweden, Norway (which won the televote), North Macedonia (which won the jury vote), Azerbaijan, Australia, and Iceland completing the top ten. Spain, Israel, Belarus, Germany, and the United Kingdom occupied the bottom five positions.

The final was opened with the flag parade introducing the 26 finalists, accompanied by Dana International performing "Tel Aviv" and her winning song for Israel in 1998, "Diva"; Ilanit performing her entry for Israel in 1973, "Ey Sham"; and Nadav Guedj performing his entry for Israel in 2015, "Golden Boy". In the interval, five former entrants were featured in the "Switch Song" act: Conchita Wurst performed "Heroes" (Sweden 2015), Måns Zelmerlöw performed "Fuego" (Cyprus 2018), Eleni Foureira performed "Dancing Lasha Tumbai" (Ukraine 2007), Verka Serduchka performed "Toy", and Gali Atari, together with the four above-mentioned artists, performed her winning song for Israel in 1979 as part of Milk and Honey, "Hallelujah". Idan Raichel then performed "Bo'ee – Come to Me" with his Idan Raichel Project. Netta then performed her new single "Nana Banana", followed by Madonna performing "Like a Prayer", "Dark Ballet", and "Future", the latter with Quavo. Actress Gal Gadot appeared in a short video skit on Tel Aviv as a tourist destination.

Madonna's interval act was heavily criticised due to her vocal performance, and further criticisms were raised when her official YouTube channel uploaded a video of the performance with the vocals auto-tuned. Madonna's representatives at Live Nation were subject to a lawsuit by host broadcaster Kan in September 2019.

Winner

Results of the final of the Eurovision Song Contest 2019
| R/O | Country | Artist | Song | Points | Place |
|---|---|---|---|---|---|
| 1 | Malta | Michela | "Chameleon" | 107 | 14 |
| 2 | Albania | Jonida Maliqi | "Ktheju tokës" | 90 | 17 |
| 3 | Czech Republic | Lake Malawi | "Friend of a Friend" | 157 | 11 |
| 4 | Germany | Sisters | "Sister" | 24 | 25 |
| 5 | Russia | Sergey Lazarev | "Scream" | 370 | 3 |
| 6 | Denmark | Leonora | "Love Is Forever" | 120 | 12 |
| 7 | San Marino | Serhat | "Say Na Na Na" | 77 | 19 |
| 8 | North Macedonia | Tamara Todevska | "Proud" | 305 | 7 |
| 9 | Sweden | John Lundvik | "Too Late for Love" | 334 | 5 |
| 10 | Slovenia | Zala Kralj and Gašper Šantl | "Sebi" | 105 | 15 |
| 11 | Cyprus | Tamta | "Replay" | 109 | 13 |
| 12 | Netherlands | Duncan Laurence | "Arcade" | 498 | 1 |
| 13 | Greece | Katerine Duska | "Better Love" | 74 | 21 |
| 14 | Israel | Kobi Marimi | "Home" | 35 | 23 |
| 15 | Norway | Keiino | "Spirit in the Sky" | 331 | 6 |
| 16 | United Kingdom | Michael Rice | "Bigger than Us" | 11 | 26 |
| 17 | Iceland | Hatari | "Hatrið mun sigra" | 232 | 10 |
| 18 | Estonia | Victor Crone | "Storm" | 76 | 20 |
| 19 | Belarus | Zena | "Like It" | 31 | 24 |
| 20 | Azerbaijan | Chingiz | "Truth" | 302 | 8 |
| 21 | France | Bilal Hassani | "Roi" | 105 | 16 |
| 22 | Italy | Mahmood | "Soldi" | 472 | 2 |
| 23 | Serbia | Nevena Božović | "Kruna" | 89 | 18 |
| 24 | Switzerland | Luca Hänni | "She Got Me" | 364 | 4 |
| 25 | Australia | Kate Miller-Heidke | "Zero Gravity" | 284 | 9 |
| 26 | Spain | Miki | "La venda" | 54 | 22 |

==== Spokespersons ====
The spokespersons announced the 12-point score from their respective country's national jury in the following order:

1. Portugal – Inês Lopes Gonçalves
2. Azerbaijan – Faig Aghayev
3. Malta – Ben Camille
4. North Macedonia – Nikola Trajkovski
5. San Marino – Monica Fabbri
6. Netherlands – Emma Wortelboer
7. Montenegro – Ajda Šufta
8. Estonia – Kelly Sildaru
9. Poland – Mateusz Szymkowiak
10. Norway – Alexander Rybak
11. Spain – Nieves Álvarez
12. Austria – Philipp Hansa
13. United Kingdom – Rylan Clark-Neal
14. Italy – Ema Stokholma
15. Albania – Andri Xhahu
16. Hungary – Bence Forró
17. Moldova – Doina Stimpovschi
18. Ireland – Sinéad Kennedy
19. Belarus – Maria Vasilevich
20. Armenia – Aram Mp3
21. Romania – Ilinca
22. Cyprus – Hovig
23. Australia – Electric Fields
24. Russia – Ivan Bessonov
25. Germany – Barbara Schöneberger
26. Belgium – David Jeanmotte
27. Sweden – Eric Saade
28. Croatia – Monika Lelas Halambek
29. Lithuania – Giedrius Masalskis
30. Serbia – Dragana Kosjerina
31. Iceland – Jóhannes Haukur Jóhannesson
32. Georgia – Gaga Abashidze
33. Greece – Gus G
34. Latvia – Laura Rizzotto
35. Czech Republic – Radka Rosická
36. Denmark – Rasmussen
37. France – Julia Molkhou
38. Finland – Christoffer Strandberg
39. Switzerland – Sinplus
40. Slovenia – Lea Sirk
41. Israel – Izhar Cohen

== Detailed voting results ==
=== Correction of the results ===
The Belarusian jury was dismissed following the revelation of their votes in the first semi-final, which is contrary to the rules of the contest. To comply with the contest's voting regulations, the EBU worked with its voting partner, Digame, to create a substitute aggregated result (calculated based on the results of other countries with similar voting records), which was approved by voting monitor Ernst & Young, to determine the Belarusian jury votes for the final. In these results, Israel, which did not receive points from any other jury during the final, received 12 points from Belarus.

However, Twitter user @euro_bruno noted on 19 May that an incorrect substitute Belarusian result was purportedly used during the broadcast of the final. The mistake was later confirmed in a statement issued by the EBU on 22 May. According to the statement, the EBU "discovered that due to a human error an incorrect aggregated result was used. This had no impact on the calculation of points derived from televoting across the 41 participating countries and the overall winner and Top 4 songs of the contest remain unchanged. To respect both the artists and EBU Members which took part, [it wished] to correct the grand final results in accordance with the rules."

The error, a reversal of the Belarusian aggregated votes, led to the bottom ten countries receiving points instead of the top ten. Malta, which had been incorrectly ranked last, would receive Belarus' 12 jury points, and Israel would end up with no jury points. The corrected point totals also changed some rankings: Sweden finished fifth overall instead of Norway, Belarus came 24th instead of Germany, San Marino ended 19th despite losing four points, and North Macedonia won the jury vote instead of Sweden.

Several publications criticised the error. Dutch newspaper Algemeen Dagblad said the EBU had to present the new vote totals "blushing with shame", calling the situation "chaos". British newspaper Metro thought the EBU had "screwed up", while the Daily Mirror named the accidental reversal of the aggregated vote total a "scandalous blunder".

The corrected results have been used in all following scoreboards, where applicable.

=== Semi-final 1 ===
Qualifiers

Split results of semi-final 1
| Place | Combined | | Jury | | Televoting | |
| Place | Country | Points | Country | Points | Country | Points |
|---|---|---|---|---|---|---|
| 1 | Australia | 261 | Czech Republic | 157 | Iceland | 151 |
| 2 | Czech Republic | 242 | Greece | 131 | Australia | 140 |
| 3 | Iceland | 221 | Australia | 121 | Estonia | 133 |
| 4 | Estonia | 198 | Cyprus | 95 | San Marino | 124 |
| 5 | Greece | 185 | Serbia | 91 | Slovenia | 93 |
| 6 | Slovenia | 167 | Belarus | 78 | Czech Republic | 85 |
| 7 | Serbia | 156 | Slovenia | 74 | Serbia | 65 |
| 8 | San Marino | 150 | Iceland | 70 | Poland | 60 |
| 9 | Cyprus | 149 | Hungary | 65 | Greece | 54 |
| 10 | Belarus | 122 | Estonia | 65 | Cyprus | 54 |
| 11 | Poland | 120 | Poland | 60 | Belarus | 44 |
| 12 | Hungary | 97 | Belgium | 50 | Portugal | 43 |
| 13 | Belgium | 70 | Montenegro | 31 | Georgia | 33 |
| 14 | Georgia | 62 | Georgia | 29 | Hungary | 32 |
| 15 | Portugal | 51 | San Marino | 26 | Belgium | 20 |
| 16 | Montenegro | 46 | Finland | 9 | Montenegro | 15 |
| 17 | Finland | 23 | Portugal | 8 | Finland | 14 |

Detailed jury voting results of semi-final 1
| Voting procedure used: 100% televoting; 100% jury vote | | Total score | Jury score | Televoting score | Jury vote | | | | | | | | | | | | | | | | | | | |
| Voting procedure used: 100% televoting; 100% jury vote | | Total score | Jury score | Televoting score | Cyprus | Montenegro | Finland | Poland | Slovenia | Czech Republic | Hungary | Belarus | Serbia | Belgium | Georgia | Australia | Iceland | Estonia | Portugal | Greece | San Marino | France | Israel | Spain |
| Contestants | **Cyprus** | 149 | 95 | 54 | | 8 | | 4 | 7 | 10 | | 4 | 8 | 3 | 5 | | 1 | 8 | 1 | **12** | 8 | 6 | 4 | 6 |
| Contestants | Montenegro | 46 | 31 | 15 | 4 | | | | | | | | **12** | | | | | | | 5 | 10 | | | |
| Contestants | Finland | 23 | 9 | 14 | | | | 1 | | | | | | | | 2 | | | | 4 | | | | 2 |
| Contestants | Poland | 120 | 60 | 60 | | | 10 | | 3 | 7 | 8 | 6 | 3 | | | 8 | | 7 | 3 | | | | 5 | |
| Contestants | **Slovenia** | 167 | 74 | 93 | 5 | 1 | 5 | 8 | | **12** | 3 | | 7 | | 7 | 4 | 5 | | 8 | 1 | 4 | | | 4 |
| Contestants | **Czech Republic** | 242 | 157 | 85 | 1 | 3 | 8 | 7 | **12** | | 10 | 7 | 10 | 8 | **12** | **12** | 10 | **12** | **12** | 8 | 3 | 8 | 6 | 8 |
| Contestants | Hungary | 97 | 65 | 32 | | 6 | 1 | 6 | 2 | 4 | | 2 | 6 | 2 | 1 | 6 | | 5 | 7 | | | 10 | 7 | |
| Contestants | **Belarus** | 122 | 78 | 44 | | | | | 8 | 8 | **12** | | 4 | 4 | 3 | | 3 | 10 | 6 | 7 | 1 | 4 | 1 | 7 |
| Contestants | **Serbia** | 156 | 91 | 65 | 6 | 7 | 3 | 10 | 5 | 6 | 7 | | | 5 | 6 | 3 | 6 | 6 | 4 | 6 | 5 | 3 | | 3 |
| Contestants | Belgium | 70 | 50 | 20 | 10 | | 2 | 3 | 6 | 3 | | | | | 2 | | 4 | | 10 | | 2 | | 3 | 5 |
| Contestants | Georgia | 62 | 29 | 33 | 7 | 2 | | | | 1 | 2 | 10 | | | | 5 | | | | | | 2 | | |
| Contestants | **Australia** | 261 | 121 | 140 | | 5 | **12** | **12** | | | 5 | 8 | 5 | **12** | 4 | | **12** | 1 | 2 | 10 | 6 | 7 | 8 | **12** |
| Contestants | **Iceland** | 221 | 70 | 151 | 8 | 4 | 4 | 5 | 4 | | 1 | 1 | | 10 | | 10 | | 2 | | 2 | 7 | **12** | | |
| Contestants | **Estonia** | 198 | 65 | 133 | | | 6 | | 1 | | 6 | **12** | 1 | 7 | 8 | | 7 | | 5 | | | 1 | 10 | 1 |
| Contestants | Portugal | 51 | 8 | 43 | 3 | | | 2 | | 2 | | | | 1 | | | | | | | | | | |
| Contestants | **Greece** | 185 | 131 | 54 | **12** | **12** | 7 | | 10 | 5 | 4 | 5 | 2 | 6 | 10 | 7 | 8 | 4 | | | **12** | 5 | **12** | 10 |
| Contestants | **San Marino** | 150 | 26 | 124 | 2 | 10 | | | | | | 3 | | | | 1 | 2 | 3 | | 3 | | | 2 | |

Detailed televoting results of semi-final 1
| Voting procedure used: 100% televoting; 100% jury vote | | Total score | Jury score | Televoting score | Televote | | | | | | | | | | | | | | | | | | | |
| Voting procedure used: 100% televoting; 100% jury vote | | Total score | Jury score | Televoting score | Cyprus | Montenegro | Finland | Poland | Slovenia | Czech Republic | Hungary | Belarus | Serbia | Belgium | Georgia | Australia | Iceland | Estonia | Portugal | Greece | San Marino | France | Israel | Spain |
| Contestants | **Cyprus** | 149 | 95 | 54 | | 4 | | | | 1 | 3 | | | 1 | 10 | 3 | | | 1 | **12** | 10 | | 8 | 1 |
| Contestants | Montenegro | 46 | 31 | 15 | | | | | 7 | | | | 8 | | | | | | | | | | | |
| Contestants | Finland | 23 | 9 | 14 | | | | | | | | | | | | | 2 | **12** | | | | | | |
| Contestants | Poland | 120 | 60 | 60 | | | 6 | | 1 | 7 | 6 | 5 | | 5 | | 5 | 8 | 2 | | | 5 | 8 | 2 | |
| Contestants | **Slovenia** | 167 | 74 | 93 | | 8 | 7 | 8 | | 5 | 7 | 8 | 10 | 3 | 5 | | 5 | 7 | 7 | 5 | 3 | 2 | | 3 |
| Contestants | **Czech Republic** | 242 | 157 | 85 | 2 | 3 | 5 | 5 | 5 | | 4 | 3 | 1 | 6 | 1 | 10 | **12** | 8 | 4 | 1 | 4 | | 6 | 5 |
| Contestants | Hungary | 97 | 65 | 32 | | | 2 | 3 | 6 | 2 | | | **12** | | | 1 | 3 | 3 | | | | | | |
| Contestants | **Belarus** | 122 | 78 | 44 | 6 | 5 | | 2 | 2 | 3 | | | 4 | | 7 | 2 | 6 | 1 | | 2 | | | 4 | |
| Contestants | **Serbia** | 156 | 91 | 65 | 5 | **12** | 1 | 4 | **12** | 4 | 2 | 4 | | | 3 | | | | 3 | 6 | 2 | 6 | 1 | |
| Contestants | Belgium | 70 | 50 | 20 | 3 | | | 1 | | | | | | | | | 1 | 4 | 2 | | | 5 | | 4 |
| Contestants | Georgia | 62 | 29 | 33 | 10 | | | | | | | 1 | | | | | | | | 10 | 1 | 4 | 7 | |
| Contestants | **Australia** | 261 | 121 | 140 | 4 | 7 | 8 | 10 | 4 | 10 | 5 | 10 | 7 | 10 | | | 10 | 5 | 10 | 8 | 6 | 7 | **12** | 7 |
| Contestants | **Iceland** | 221 | 70 | 151 | 1 | 6 | **12** | **12** | 10 | 6 | 10 | **12** | 6 | 7 | 6 | **12** | | 6 | 8 | 7 | 7 | 10 | 3 | 10 |
| Contestants | **Estonia** | 198 | 65 | 133 | 7 | 2 | 10 | 7 | 8 | 8 | 8 | 6 | 3 | **12** | 8 | 7 | 7 | | **12** | 3 | 8 | 1 | 10 | 6 |
| Contestants | Portugal | 51 | 8 | 43 | | | 3 | | | | | 2 | | 8 | 2 | 4 | | | | | | **12** | | **12** |
| Contestants | **Greece** | 185 | 131 | 54 | **12** | 1 | | | | | 1 | | 2 | 4 | 4 | 8 | | | 5 | | **12** | 3 | | 2 |
| Contestants | **San Marino** | 150 | 26 | 124 | 8 | 10 | 4 | 6 | 3 | **12** | **12** | 7 | 5 | 2 | **12** | 6 | 4 | 10 | 6 | 4 | | | 5 | 8 |

==== 12 points ====
Below is a summary of the maximum 12 points awarded by each country's professional jury and televote in the first semi-final. Countries in bold gave the maximum 24 points (12 points apiece from professional jury and televoting) to the specified entrant.

12 points awarded by juries
| N. | Contestant | Nation(s) giving 12 points |
|---|---|---|
| 5 | Australia | Belgium, Finland, Iceland, Poland, Spain |
| 5 | Czech Republic | Australia, Estonia, Georgia, Portugal, Slovenia |
| 4 | Greece | **Cyprus**, Israel, Montenegro, **San Marino** |
| 1 | Belarus | Hungary |
| 1 | Cyprus | **Greece** |
| 1 | Estonia | Belarus |
| 1 | Iceland | France |
| 1 | Montenegro | Serbia |
| 1 | Slovenia | Czech Republic |

12 points awarded by televoting
| N. | Contestant | Nation(s) giving 12 points |
|---|---|---|
| 4 | Iceland | Australia, Belarus, Finland, Poland |
| 3 | San Marino | Czech Republic, Georgia, Hungary |
| 2 | Estonia | Belgium, Portugal |
| 2 | Greece | **Cyprus**, **San Marino** |
| 2 | Portugal | France, Spain |
| 2 | Serbia | Montenegro, Slovenia |
| 1 | Australia | Israel |
| 1 | Cyprus | **Greece** |
| 1 | Czech Republic | Iceland |
| 1 | Finland | Estonia |
| 1 | Hungary | Serbia |

=== Semi-final 2 ===
Qualifiers

Split results of semi-final 2
| Place | Combined | | Jury | | Televoting | |
| Place | Country | Points | Country | Points | Country | Points |
|---|---|---|---|---|---|---|
| 1 | Netherlands | 280 | North Macedonia | 155 | Norway | 170 |
| 2 | North Macedonia | 239 | Sweden | 150 | Netherlands | 140 |
| 3 | Sweden | 238 | Netherlands | 140 | Switzerland | 137 |
| 4 | Switzerland | 232 | Malta | 107 | Russia | 124 |
| 5 | Azerbaijan | 224 | Azerbaijan | 103 | Azerbaijan | 121 |
| 6 | Russia | 217 | Switzerland | 95 | Sweden | 88 |
| 7 | Norway | 210 | Russia | 93 | North Macedonia | 84 |
| 8 | Malta | 157 | Moldova | 58 | Lithuania | 77 |
| 9 | Albania | 96 | Denmark | 53 | Albania | 58 |
| 10 | Denmark | 94 | Romania | 47 | Malta | 50 |
| 11 | Lithuania | 93 | Norway | 40 | Denmark | 41 |
| 12 | Moldova | 85 | Albania | 38 | Croatia | 38 |
| 13 | Romania | 71 | Latvia | 37 | Moldova | 27 |
| 14 | Croatia | 64 | Armenia | 26 | Romania | 24 |
| 15 | Latvia | 50 | Croatia | 26 | Armenia | 23 |
| 16 | Armenia | 49 | Austria | 21 | Latvia | 13 |
| 17 | Austria | 21 | Lithuania | 16 | Ireland | 3 |
| 18 | Ireland | 16 | Ireland | 13 | Austria | 0 |

Detailed jury voting results of semi-final 2
| Voting procedure used: 100% televoting; 100% jury vote | | Total score | Jury score | Televoting score | Jury vote | | | | | | | | | | | | | | | | | | | | |
| Voting procedure used: 100% televoting; 100% jury vote | | Total score | Jury score | Televoting score | Armenia | Ireland | Moldova | Switzerland | Latvia | Romania | Denmark | Sweden | Austria | Croatia | Malta | Lithuania | Russia | Albania | Norway | Netherlands | North Macedonia | Azerbaijan | Germany | Italy | United Kingdom |
| Contestants | Armenia | 49 | 26 | 23 | | 2 | 4 | | 2 | | | | 1 | 1 | 6 | | 6 | | | 2 | 2 | | | | |
| Contestants | Ireland | 16 | 13 | 3 | | | 5 | | | | | | | | | | | | | | | | | 8 | |
| Contestants | Moldova | 85 | 58 | 27 | 5 | | | 5 | | **12** | | 6 | | 2 | 5 | | 5 | 3 | 2 | 6 | | 3 | | | 4 |
| Contestants | **Switzerland** | 232 | 95 | 137 | 6 | 10 | | | | 3 | 4 | **12** | 7 | 10 | | 5 | 2 | 5 | 8 | 8 | 5 | 2 | 8 | | |
| Contestants | Latvia | 50 | 37 | 13 | 3 | | | 7 | | | 6 | | | | | 7 | | | 1 | | 3 | 5 | | 5 | |
| Contestants | Romania | 71 | 47 | 24 | 2 | | **12** | | | | | | | | 1 | | **12** | | | | 1 | 8 | 4 | 2 | 5 |
| Contestants | **Denmark** | 94 | 53 | 41 | | 3 | 1 | 2 | 7 | | | 2 | 4 | | | | 3 | | 5 | 3 | | | 5 | **12** | 6 |
| Contestants | **Sweden** | 238 | 150 | 88 | **12** | **12** | | 10 | **12** | 4 | **12** | | **12** | 4 | 10 | 10 | | 7 | **12** | **12** | 4 | | 7 | | 10 |
| Contestants | Austria | 21 | 21 | 0 | | | | | 1 | 1 | 2 | 8 | | | | 6 | | 1 | | | | | 1 | 1 | |
| Contestants | Croatia | 64 | 26 | 38 | | 1 | | | | | 5 | | 5 | | | | | 2 | | 5 | | | | | 8 |
| Contestants | **Malta** | 157 | 107 | 50 | 10 | 4 | 7 | 4 | 4 | 5 | | 4 | 2 | 6 | | 3 | 8 | 6 | 4 | 10 | 7 | 6 | 6 | 10 | 1 |
| Contestants | Lithuania | 93 | 16 | 77 | | | | 3 | 6 | | | 3 | | | 3 | | | | | | | 1 | | | |
| Contestants | **Russia** | 217 | 93 | 124 | 7 | | 8 | 1 | 3 | 6 | 3 | 7 | | 3 | 8 | 4 | | 8 | 3 | 7 | 10 | **12** | | | 3 |
| Contestants | **Albania** | 96 | 38 | 58 | | | 2 | | | 2 | | | | 5 | | | 7 | | | | **12** | 7 | | 3 | |
| Contestants | **Norway** | 210 | 40 | 170 | 1 | 7 | 3 | 6 | | | 8 | 5 | 3 | | 4 | 1 | | | | | | | 2 | | |
| Contestants | **Netherlands** | 280 | 140 | 140 | 4 | 8 | | **12** | 8 | 8 | 7 | 10 | 10 | 8 | **12** | **12** | 1 | 4 | 10 | | 6 | 4 | 10 | 4 | 2 |
| Contestants | **North Macedonia** | 239 | 155 | 84 | 8 | 6 | 10 | 8 | 5 | 10 | 10 | | 8 | **12** | 2 | 2 | 10 | **12** | 7 | 4 | | 10 | **12** | 7 | **12** |
| Contestants | **Azerbaijan** | 224 | 103 | 121 | | 5 | 6 | | 10 | 7 | 1 | 1 | 6 | 7 | 7 | 8 | 4 | 10 | 6 | 1 | 8 | | 3 | 6 | 7 |

Detailed televoting results of semi-final 2
| Voting procedure used: 100% televoting; 100% jury vote | | Total score | Jury score | Televoting score | Televote | | | | | | | | | | | | | | | | | | | | |
| Voting procedure used: 100% televoting; 100% jury vote | | Total score | Jury score | Televoting score | Armenia | Ireland | Moldova | Switzerland | Latvia | Romania | Denmark | Sweden | Austria | Croatia | Malta | Lithuania | Russia | Albania | Norway | Netherlands | North Macedonia | Azerbaijan | Germany | Italy | United Kingdom |
| Contestants | Armenia | 49 | 26 | 23 | | | 2 | | | | | | | | | | 10 | | | 5 | 6 | | | | |
| Contestants | Ireland | 16 | 13 | 3 | | | | | | | | | | | | | | | | | | | | | 3 |
| Contestants | Moldova | 85 | 58 | 27 | 3 | | | | | **12** | 2 | | | | | | 5 | | | | | | | 5 | |
| Contestants | **Switzerland** | 232 | 95 | 137 | 8 | 6 | 6 | | 3 | 7 | 6 | 4 | **12** | 8 | **12** | 4 | 4 | 6 | 7 | 8 | 2 | 10 | **12** | 6 | 6 |
| Contestants | Latvia | 50 | 37 | 13 | | | 1 | | | | | | | | | **12** | | | | | | | | | |
| Contestants | Romania | 71 | 47 | 24 | | 1 | **12** | | | | | | | | | | | | | | | | | 10 | 1 |
| Contestants | **Denmark** | 94 | 53 | 41 | 1 | 2 | | 2 | 5 | | | 10 | 2 | 1 | 2 | 3 | | 1 | 8 | 4 | | | | | |
| Contestants | **Sweden** | 238 | 150 | 88 | 4 | 5 | | 8 | 4 | 1 | 10 | | 1 | 4 | 7 | 5 | 2 | 4 | 10 | 10 | 1 | 3 | 5 | | 4 |
| Contestants | Austria | 21 | 21 | 0 | | | | | | | | | | | | | | | | | | | | | |
| Contestants | Croatia | 64 | 26 | 38 | 2 | | | 5 | 1 | | | 1 | 8 | | 1 | | 3 | 3 | | | 10 | 1 | 3 | | |
| Contestants | **Malta** | 157 | 107 | 50 | 7 | 4 | 3 | | 2 | 2 | 5 | | | 2 | | 1 | | | 3 | 1 | 4 | 6 | | 2 | 8 |
| Contestants | Lithuania | 93 | 16 | 77 | | **12** | 5 | 1 | 10 | | 4 | 7 | | | 3 | | 1 | 5 | **12** | 2 | | 2 | 1 | | **12** |
| Contestants | **Russia** | 217 | 93 | 124 | **12** | 7 | 10 | 3 | **12** | 8 | 3 | 3 | 4 | 3 | 5 | 10 | | 2 | 4 | 3 | 7 | **12** | 7 | 7 | 2 |
| Contestants | **Albania** | 96 | 38 | 58 | | | | **12** | | 3 | | 2 | 3 | 6 | | | | | 2 | | **12** | 4 | 2 | **12** | |
| Contestants | **Norway** | 210 | 40 | 170 | 5 | 10 | 4 | 10 | 8 | 5 | **12** | **12** | 10 | 10 | 8 | 8 | 8 | **12** | | **12** | 3 | 5 | 10 | 8 | 10 |
| Contestants | **Netherlands** | 280 | 140 | 140 | 10 | 8 | 7 | 6 | 7 | 6 | 8 | 5 | 6 | 7 | 10 | 6 | 7 | 10 | 5 | | 8 | 8 | 8 | 3 | 5 |
| Contestants | **North Macedonia** | 239 | 155 | 84 | 6 | | | 7 | | 4 | 1 | 6 | 5 | **12** | 6 | 2 | 6 | 8 | 1 | 6 | | 7 | 6 | 1 | |
| Contestants | **Azerbaijan** | 224 | 103 | 121 | | 3 | 8 | 4 | 6 | 10 | 7 | 8 | 7 | 5 | 4 | 7 | **12** | 7 | 6 | 7 | 5 | | 4 | 4 | 7 |

==== 12 points ====
Below is a summary of the maximum 12 points awarded by each country's professional jury and televote in the second semi-final. Countries in bold gave the maximum 24 points (12 points apiece from professional jury and televoting) to the specified entrant.

12 points awarded by juries
| N. | Contestant | Nation(s) giving 12 points |
|---|---|---|
| 7 | Sweden | Armenia, Austria, Denmark, Ireland, Latvia, Netherlands, Norway |
| 4 | North Macedonia | Albania, **Croatia**, Germany, United Kingdom |
| 3 | Netherlands | Lithuania, Malta, Switzerland |
| 2 | Romania | **Moldova**, Russia |
| 1 | Albania | **North Macedonia** |
| 1 | Denmark | Italy |
| 1 | Moldova | **Romania** |
| 1 | Russia | **Azerbaijan** |
| 1 | Switzerland | Sweden |

12 points awarded by televoting
| N. | Contestant | Nation(s) giving 12 points |
|---|---|---|
| 4 | Norway | Albania, Denmark, Netherlands, Sweden |
| 3 | Albania | Italy, **North Macedonia**, Switzerland |
| 3 | Lithuania | Ireland, Norway, United Kingdom |
| 3 | Russia | Armenia, **Azerbaijan**, Latvia |
| 3 | Switzerland | Austria, Germany, Malta |
| 1 | Azerbaijan | Russia |
| 1 | Latvia | Lithuania |
| 1 | Moldova | **Romania** |
| 1 | North Macedonia | **Croatia** |
| 1 | Romania | **Moldova** |

=== Final ===
Winner

Split results of the final
| Place | Combined | | Jury | | Televoting | |
| Place | Country | Points | Country | Points | Country | Points |
|---|---|---|---|---|---|---|
| 1 | Netherlands | 498 | North Macedonia | 247 | Norway | 291 |
| 2 | Italy | 472 | Sweden | 241 | Netherlands | 261 |
| 3 | Russia | 370 | Netherlands | 237 | Italy | 253 |
| 4 | Switzerland | 364 | Italy | 219 | Russia | 244 |
| 5 | Sweden | 334 | Azerbaijan | 202 | Switzerland | 212 |
| 6 | Norway | 331 | Australia | 153 | Iceland | 186 |
| 7 | North Macedonia | 305 | Switzerland | 152 | Australia | 131 |
| 8 | Azerbaijan | 302 | Czech Republic | 150 | Azerbaijan | 100 |
| 9 | Australia | 284 | Russia | 126 | Sweden | 93 |
| 10 | Iceland | 232 | Malta | 87 | San Marino | 65 |
| 11 | Czech Republic | 157 | Cyprus | 77 | Slovenia | 59 |
| 12 | Denmark | 120 | Denmark | 69 | North Macedonia | 58 |
| 13 | Cyprus | 109 | France | 67 | Serbia | 54 |
| 14 | Malta | 107 | Greece | 50 | Spain | 53 |
| 15 | Slovenia | 105 | Slovenia | 46 | Denmark | 51 |
| 16 | France | 105 | Iceland | 46 | Estonia | 48 |
| 17 | Albania | 90 | Albania | 43 | Albania | 47 |
| 18 | Serbia | 89 | Norway | 40 | France | 38 |
| 19 | San Marino | 77 | Serbia | 35 | Israel | 35 |
| 20 | Estonia | 76 | Estonia | 28 | Cyprus | 32 |
| 21 | Greece | 74 | Germany | 24 | Greece | 24 |
| 22 | Spain | 54 | Belarus | 18 | Malta | 20 |
| 23 | Israel | 35 | San Marino | 12 | Belarus | 13 |
| 24 | Belarus | 31 | United Kingdom | 8 | Czech Republic | 7 |
| 25 | Germany | 24 | Spain | 1 | United Kingdom | 3 |
| 26 | United Kingdom | 11 | Israel | 0 | Germany | 0 |

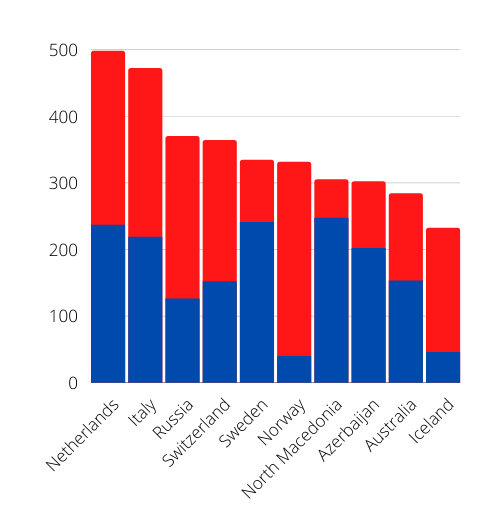
Distribution of points to the top 10 countries in the final Televoting Jury votes

Detailed jury voting results of the final
| Voting procedure used: 100% televoting; 100% jury vote | | Total score | Jury score | Televoting score | Jury vote | | | | | | | | | | | | | | | | | | | | | | | | | | | | | | | | | | | | | | | | |
| Voting procedure used: 100% televoting; 100% jury vote | | Total score | Jury score | Televoting score | Portugal | Azerbaijan | Malta | North Macedonia | San Marino | Netherlands | Montenegro | Estonia | Poland | Norway | Spain | Austria | United Kingdom | Italy | Albania | Hungary | Moldova | Ireland | Belarus | Armenia | Romania | Cyprus | Australia | Russia | Germany | Belgium | Sweden | Croatia | Lithuania | Serbia | Iceland | Georgia | Greece | Latvia | Czech Republic | Denmark | France | Finland | Switzerland | Slovenia | Israel |
| Contestants | Malta | 107 | 87 | 20 | | 10 | | 5 | | 8 | 6 | | 4 | | | | | 8 | | | 1 | | **12** | 4 | | 3 | | 6 | 3 | | 2 | | | | | | 5 | 1 | 3 | | | 1 | | 1 | 4 |
| Contestants | Albania | 90 | 43 | 47 | | 7 | 2 | 8 | 7 | | 8 | | | | | | | 1 | | | | | | | 2 | 2 | | 3 | | | | | | | | | 3 | | | | | | | | |
| Contestants | Czech Republic | 157 | 150 | 7 | 10 | | | | | 4 | 1 | 8 | | **12** | 6 | 3 | 1 | 4 | | **12** | 8 | | | 3 | 8 | | 5 | | | 5 | 1 | 7 | 7 | 4 | 6 | **12** | | 3 | | | 3 | 4 | | **12** | 1 |
| Contestants | Germany | 24 | 24 | 0 | | | | | | | | | | | | | | | | | | 2 | | | | | 3 | | | | | | 5 | | | | | | | 8 | | | 6 | | |
| Contestants | Russia | 370 | 126 | 244 | | **12** | 10 | 6 | 10 | 5 | 10 | 6 | | | 2 | | 4 | | 1 | | 5 | 3 | 1 | 5 | 6 | 10 | 4 | | | | 3 | 2 | 1 | | | | 10 | 4 | | 3 | | | 3 | | |
| Contestants | Denmark | 120 | 69 | 51 | | | | | | 7 | 3 | 2 | 5 | 4 | | | 3 | **12** | | 6 | 4 | | | | | | | | 1 | 1 | | | | 2 | | 7 | | 7 | | | 1 | | | 4 | |
| Contestants | San Marino | 77 | 12 | 65 | | | 1 | | | | | | | | | | | | | | | | | | | | | 5 | | | | | | | | | 6 | | | | | | | | |
| Contestants | North Macedonia | 305 | 247 | 58 | 5 | 8 | 3 | | 1 | 3 | 7 | | 8 | 10 | | **12** | **12** | 10 | **12** | 10 | **12** | 5 | 10 | 10 | 7 | | 7 | 4 | 7 | | | 10 | | **12** | 8 | | 1 | 8 | 7 | 10 | 7 | 7 | **12** | 2 | |
| Contestants | Sweden | 334 | 241 | 93 | 2 | | 5 | | | **12** | | **12** | | 8 | **12** | 6 | 10 | 2 | 6 | 4 | 2 | **12** | 2 | **12** | 1 | 7 | **12** | | 2 | | | 5 | 8 | 8 | **12** | 2 | | 10 | **12** | **12** | 10 | **12** | 8 | 7 | 6 |
| Contestants | Slovenia | 105 | 46 | 59 | 3 | 4 | | | | | | | 10 | | 1 | | | | | | | | | | | | | | | | | | 4 | | | 4 | 4 | | 10 | | | 6 | | | |
| Contestants | Cyprus | 109 | 77 | 32 | | 3 | 6 | 1 | 5 | 1 | 5 | | | 1 | 5 | | | | 7 | | | | 8 | | | | | 8 | | 2 | 7 | | | | | 6 | **12** | | | | | | | | |
| Contestants | **Netherlands** | **498** | 237 | 261 | **12** | | 7 | 7 | 3 | | | 7 | | 7 | 8 | 8 | 6 | | | 1 | 3 | 8 | 6 | 6 | 5 | 5 | 6 | | 8 | 6 | **12** | 6 | **12** | | 7 | 8 | | **12** | 6 | 7 | **12** | 8 | 10 | 6 | **12** |
| Contestants | Greece | 74 | 50 | 24 | | 6 | 4 | | 8 | | | | | | | | | | 4 | | | | 3 | | | **12** | | 10 | | 3 | | | | | | | | | | | | | | | |
| Contestants | Israel | 35 | 0 | 35 | | | | | | | | | | | | | | | | | | | | | | | | | | | | | | | | | | | | | | | | | |
| Contestants | Norway | 331 | 40 | 291 | 4 | | | | | | | | 1 | | | 1 | | | | | 7 | 6 | | | | | | | 5 | | 4 | | | | | | | | | 5 | | | 7 | | |
| Contestants | United Kingdom | 11 | 8 | 3 | | | | | | | | | | 2 | | | | | | 2 | | | | 2 | | | | | | | | | | | | 1 | | | | | | | 1 | | |
| Contestants | Iceland | 232 | 46 | 186 | | | | 2 | 6 | | | | 3 | | | | | | | | | | | | | | 8 | 2 | | 10 | | | 6 | | | | | | 4 | | 5 | | | | |
| Contestants | Estonia | 76 | 28 | 48 | | | | | | | | | | | | | | 5 | | | | | | | | | | | | | | 1 | | 6 | | | | 5 | 1 | 2 | | | | | 8 |
| Contestants | Belarus | 31 | 18 | 13 | | 1 | | | | | | 1 | | | | | | | | 8 | | | | 1 | | | | 7 | | | | | | | | | | | | | | | | | |
| Contestants | Azerbaijan | 302 | 202 | 100 | 8 | | 8 | 4 | 4 | | | 5 | 2 | 5 | 7 | 4 | 7 | 7 | 8 | 5 | 6 | 7 | 5 | | 10 | 6 | 2 | **12** | | | 5 | | 10 | 3 | 4 | 10 | 8 | 6 | 5 | 4 | 6 | 2 | | 10 | 7 |
| Contestants | France | 105 | 67 | 38 | | | | | | | | 3 | 6 | | | 5 | 2 | 3 | 3 | | | | | | | 4 | 10 | | 4 | 8 | | 3 | | 1 | 1 | 5 | | | 2 | | | | 2 | 3 | 2 |
| Contestants | Italy | 472 | 219 | 253 | 6 | 5 | **12** | **12** | **12** | 6 | 2 | | | 3 | 4 | 7 | | | 5 | 7 | | 1 | 7 | 8 | | 8 | | | **12** | **12** | 8 | **12** | 3 | 10 | 3 | | 7 | 2 | 8 | 1 | 8 | 5 | 5 | 8 | 10 |
| Contestants | Serbia | 89 | 35 | 54 | | | | | | | **12** | 4 | 7 | | | 2 | | | | | | | | | 3 | | 1 | | | | | 4 | | | 2 | | | | | | | | | | |
| Contestants | Switzerland | 364 | 152 | 212 | 1 | | | 3 | 2 | 10 | | 10 | | 6 | 3 | 10 | 5 | | 10 | 3 | | 10 | 4 | 7 | 4 | 1 | | | 6 | 7 | 10 | 8 | | 5 | 5 | 3 | | | | 6 | 2 | 3 | | 5 | 3 |
| Contestants | Australia | 284 | 153 | 131 | 7 | 2 | | 10 | | 2 | 4 | | **12** | | 10 | | 8 | 6 | 2 | | 10 | 4 | | | **12** | | | | 10 | 4 | 6 | | 2 | 7 | 10 | | 2 | | | | 4 | 10 | 4 | | 5 |
| Contestants | Spain | 54 | 1 | 53 | | | | | | | | | | | | | | | | | | | | | | | | 1 | | | | | | | | | | | | | | | | | |

Detailed televoting results of the final
| Voting procedure used: 100% televoting; 100% jury vote | | Total score | Jury score | Televoting score | Televote | | | | | | | | | | | | | | | | | | | | | | | | | | | | | | | | | | | | | | | | |
| Voting procedure used: 100% televoting; 100% jury vote | | Total score | Jury score | Televoting score | Portugal | Azerbaijan | Malta | North Macedonia | San Marino | Netherlands | Montenegro | Estonia | Poland | Norway | Spain | Austria | United Kingdom | Italy | Albania | Hungary | Moldova | Ireland | Belarus | Armenia | Romania | Cyprus | Australia | Russia | Germany | Belgium | Sweden | Croatia | Lithuania | Serbia | Iceland | Georgia | Greece | Latvia | Czech Republic | Denmark | France | Finland | Switzerland | Slovenia | Israel |
| Contestants | Malta | 107 | 87 | 20 | | 4 | | 6 | | | | | | | | | | | | | | | | 6 | | | 4 | | | | | | | | | | | | | | | | | | |
| Contestants | Albania | 90 | 43 | 47 | | | | **12** | | | 7 | | | | | | | **12** | | | | | | | | | | | | | | 1 | | | | | 5 | | | | | | 10 | | |
| Contestants | Czech Republic | 157 | 150 | 7 | | | | | | | | | 1 | | | | | | | | 2 | | | | | | 2 | | | | | | | | 2 | | | | | | | | | | |
| Contestants | Germany | 24 | 24 | 0 | | | | | | | | | | | | | | | | | | | | | | | | | | | | | | | | | | | | | | | | | |
| Contestants | Russia | 370 | 126 | 244 | 10 | **12** | 4 | | **12** | | 10 | **12** | 3 | 1 | 2 | 5 | | 8 | **12** | 7 | **12** | 5 | **12** | **12** | 7 | 10 | | | 8 | 1 | | | **12** | 8 | | 8 | 8 | **12** | **12** | | 3 | 4 | | | **12** |
| Contestants | Denmark | 120 | 69 | 51 | 1 | | | | | 5 | | 6 | | 5 | | | 6 | 4 | | | | | | | | | | | 4 | | 7 | | | | 4 | | | | | | 4 | | 1 | 3 | 1 |
| Contestants | San Marino | 77 | 12 | 65 | | 10 | | 8 | | | 8 | | | | | | | | 10 | 6 | 8 | | 1 | | | | | | | | | 2 | | 1 | 1 | 10 | | | | | | | | | |
| Contestants | North Macedonia | 305 | 247 | 58 | | 3 | 5 | | | 1 | 6 | | | | | | | | 6 | | | | | | | | | | | | 2 | 7 | | **12** | | 2 | | | | | | | 2 | **12** | |
| Contestants | Sweden | 334 | 241 | 93 | | | 6 | | | 8 | | 3 | | **12** | 6 | | 5 | | | | | 2 | | 2 | | | 8 | | 1 | 2 | | | 3 | | 8 | 6 | | | | 10 | | 7 | 4 | | |
| Contestants | Slovenia | 105 | 46 | 59 | | | | 2 | | | 4 | 7 | 4 | | | 2 | | | | 3 | | | 5 | | | | | 6 | 3 | | | 10 | | 10 | | | | 2 | | | | 1 | | | |
| Contestants | Cyprus | 109 | 77 | 32 | | | | | 7 | | | | | | | | 1 | | | | | | | | | | | | | | | | | | | **12** | **12** | | | | | | | | |
| Contestants | **Netherlands** | **498** | 237 | 261 | 8 | 7 | 10 | 7 | 6 | | 1 | 8 | 10 | 8 | 8 | 7 | 4 | 5 | 7 | 8 | 6 | 8 | 10 | 10 | **12** | 6 | 6 | 5 | 7 | **12** | 6 | 4 | 7 | 3 | 5 | 5 | 6 | 5 | 4 | 7 | 5 | 5 | 6 | 5 | 2 |
| Contestants | Greece | 74 | 50 | 24 | | | | | 10 | | | | | | | | | | 2 | | | | | | | **12** | | | | | | | | | | | | | | | | | | | |
| Contestants | Israel | 35 | 0 | 35 | | | | | 1 | | | | | | | | | | | | 7 | | | | 3 | 5 | | | | | | | | | | 4 | | | 3 | | **12** | | | | |
| Contestants | Norway | 331 | 40 | 291 | 6 | 1 | 7 | 5 | 3 | **12** | | 10 | 8 | | 7 | 8 | **12** | 10 | 5 | 10 | 3 | **12** | 8 | 5 | 4 | 1 | **12** | 10 | **12** | 7 | **12** | 5 | 8 | 4 | **12** | | | 8 | 10 | **12** | 8 | 10 | 8 | 6 | 10 |
| Contestants | United Kingdom | 11 | 8 | 3 | | | | | | | | | | | | | | | | | | 3 | | | | | | | | | | | | | | | | | | | | | | | |
| Contestants | Iceland | 232 | 46 | 186 | 3 | | 1 | | 2 | 7 | 2 | 5 | **12** | 10 | 3 | 6 | 8 | 7 | | **12** | 1 | 6 | 7 | 3 | 5 | | 10 | 7 | 2 | 3 | 8 | 3 | 6 | 5 | | 3 | 2 | 7 | 6 | 4 | 1 | **12** | | 7 | |
| Contestants | Estonia | 76 | 28 | 48 | | | | | | | | | | 2 | | | | | | | | 1 | | | | | | | | | 10 | | 4 | | 3 | | | 10 | 1 | 8 | | 8 | | 1 | |
| Contestants | Belarus | 31 | 18 | 13 | | 5 | | | | | | | | | | | | | | | | | | | | | | 8 | | | | | | | | | | | | | | | | | |
| Contestants | Azerbaijan | 302 | 202 | 100 | | | 2 | 1 | 4 | 4 | 3 | 1 | 2 | 3 | 1 | 1 | 3 | 1 | 3 | 2 | 10 | | 6 | | 6 | | 1 | **12** | | | 3 | | 5 | | | 7 | | 4 | 7 | 5 | | | | | 3 |
| Contestants | France | 105 | 67 | 38 | 2 | | | | | | | | | | 4 | | | 2 | | 1 | | | | 4 | 1 | 3 | 3 | | | 10 | | | | | | | 1 | | | | | | 3 | | 4 |
| Contestants | Italy | 472 | 219 | 253 | 7 | 6 | **12** | 3 | 8 | 10 | 5 | | 7 | 7 | **12** | 10 | | | 8 | 4 | 5 | 4 | 3 | 7 | 8 | 8 | 5 | 1 | 6 | 8 | 4 | **12** | 10 | 7 | 6 | 1 | 10 | 3 | 2 | 3 | 10 | 3 | **12** | 8 | 8 |
| Contestants | Serbia | 89 | 35 | 54 | | | | 10 | | | **12** | | | | | 4 | | | | | | | | | | | | 3 | | | | 8 | | | | | | | | | | | 7 | 10 | |
| Contestants | Switzerland | 364 | 152 | 212 | 5 | 8 | 8 | 4 | 5 | 6 | | 4 | 5 | 6 | 10 | **12** | 7 | 3 | 4 | 5 | 4 | 7 | 4 | 8 | 10 | 7 | 7 | 2 | 10 | 5 | 1 | 6 | 2 | 6 | 7 | | 7 | 1 | 5 | 6 | 2 | 2 | | 4 | 7 |
| Contestants | Australia | 284 | 153 | 131 | 4 | | 3 | | | 2 | | 2 | 6 | 4 | 5 | 3 | 10 | 6 | 1 | | | 10 | 2 | 1 | 2 | 2 | | 4 | 5 | 4 | 5 | | 1 | | 10 | | 3 | 6 | 8 | 2 | 6 | 6 | | 2 | 6 |
| Contestants | Spain | 54 | 1 | 53 | **12** | 2 | | | | 3 | | | | | | | 2 | | | | | | | | | 4 | | | | 6 | | | | 2 | | | 4 | | | 1 | 7 | | 5 | | 5 |

==== 12 points ====
Below is a summary of the maximum 12 points awarded by each country's professional jury and televote in the final. Countries in bold gave the maximum 24 points (12 points apiece from professional jury and televoting) to the specified entrant.

12 points awarded by juries
| N. | Contestant | Nation(s) giving 12 points |
|---|---|---|
| 10 | Sweden | Armenia, Australia, Czech Republic, Denmark, Estonia, Finland, Iceland, Ireland, Netherlands, Spain |
| 6 | Italy | Belgium, **Croatia**, Germany, **Malta**, North Macedonia, San Marino |
| 6 | Netherlands | France, Israel, Latvia, Lithuania, Portugal, Sweden |
| 6 | North Macedonia | Albania, Austria, Moldova, **Serbia**, Switzerland, United Kingdom |
| 4 | Czech Republic | Georgia, Hungary, Norway, Slovenia |
| 2 | Australia | Poland, Romania |
| 1 | Azerbaijan | **Russia** |
| 1 | Cyprus | **Greece** |
| 1 | Denmark | Italy |
| 1 | Greece | **Cyprus** |
| 1 | Malta | Belarus |
| 1 | Russia | **Azerbaijan** |
| 1 | Serbia | **Montenegro** |

12 points awarded by televoting
| N. | Contestant | Nation(s) giving 12 points |
|---|---|---|
| 11 | Russia | Albania, Armenia, **Azerbaijan**, Belarus, Czech Republic, Estonia, Israel, Latvia, Lithuania, Moldova, San Marino |
| 8 | Norway | Australia, Denmark, Germany, Iceland, Ireland, Netherlands, Sweden, United Kingdom |
| 4 | Italy | **Croatia**, **Malta**, Spain, Switzerland |
| 3 | Iceland | Finland, Hungary, Poland |
| 2 | Albania | Italy, North Macedonia |
| 2 | Cyprus | Georgia, **Greece** |
| 2 | Netherlands | Belgium, Romania |
| 2 | North Macedonia | **Serbia**, Slovenia |
| 1 | Azerbaijan | **Russia** |
| 1 | Greece | **Cyprus** |
| 1 | Israel | France |
| 1 | Serbia | **Montenegro** |
| 1 | Spain | Portugal |
| 1 | Sweden | Norway |
| 1 | Switzerland | Austria |

== Broadcasts ==
Broadcasters may add commentary from commentators working on-location or remotely. Commentators can add insight to the participating entries and the provision of voting information.

The EBU provided international live streams of both semi-finals and the final through their official YouTube channel with no commentary. The live streams were geo-blocked to viewers in Bolivia, Canada, Costa Rica, Dominican Republic, Ecuador, El Salvador, Guatemala, Honduras, Nicaragua, Panama, Paraguay, Uruguay, United States, and Venezuela due to rights limitations. After the live broadcasts, all three shows were made available for every country listed above, except the United States and Canada.

Broadcasters and commentators in participating countries
| Country | Broadcaster | Channel(s) | Show(s) | Commentator(s) | Ref(s) |
|---|---|---|---|---|---|
| Albania | RTSH | RTSH, RTSH Muzikë, Radio Tirana | All shows | Andri Xhahu | |
| Armenia | AMPTV | Armenia 1, Public Radio of Armenia | All shows | Aram Mp3 and Avet Barseghyan | |
| Australia | SBS | SBS | All shows | Myf Warhurst and Joel Creasey | |
| Austria | ORF | ORF 1 | All shows | Andi Knoll | |
| Azerbaijan | İTV | | All shows | Murad Arif | |
| Belarus | BTRC | Belarus-1, Belarus 24 | All shows | Evgeny Perlin | |
| Belgium | RTBF | La Une | All shows | Jean-Louis Lahaye and Maureen Louys | |
| Belgium | VRT | één | SF1/Final | Peter Van de Veire | |
| Belgium | VRT | Ketnet | SF2 | Peter Van de Veire | |
| Croatia | HRT | HRT 1, HR 2 | All shows | Duško Ćurlić | |
| Cyprus | CyBC | CyBC | All shows | Evridiki and Tasos Tryfonos | |
| Czech Republic | ČT | ČT2 | Semi-finals | Libor Bouček | |
| Czech Republic | ČT | ČT1 | Final | Libor Bouček | |
| Denmark | DR | DR1 | All shows | Ole Tøpholm | |
| Estonia | ERR | ETV | All shows | Marko Reikop | |
| Estonia | ERR | ETV+ | All shows | Aleksandr Hobotov and Julia Kalenda | |
| Finland | Yle | Yle TV2 | All shows | Finnish: Mikko Silvennoinen and Krista Siegfrids; Swedish: Eva Frantz and Johan Lindroos | |
| Finland | Yle | Yle Radio Suomi | Semi-finals | Sanna Pirkkalainen and Toni Laaksonen | |
| Finland | Yle | Yle Radio Suomi | Final | Sanna Pirkkalainen and Sami Sykkö | |
| France | France Télévisions | France 4 | Semi-finals | André Manoukian and Sandy Heribert | |
| France | France Télévisions | France 2 | Final | Stéphane Bern and André Manoukian | |
| Georgia | GPB | 1TV | Semi-finals | Helen Kalandadze and Gaga Abashidze | |
| Georgia | GPB | 1TV | Final | Helen Kalandadze, Gaga Abashidze and Nodiko Tatishvili | |
| Germany | ARD | One | Semi-finals | Peter Urban | |
| Germany | ARD | One, Das Erste, Deutsche Welle | Final | Peter Urban | |
| Greece | ERT | ERT2, ERT Sports HD | All shows | Giorgos Kapoutzidis and Maria Kozakou | |
| Greece | ERT | Voice of Greece | SF1/Final | Giorgos Kapoutzidis and Maria Kozakou | |
| Hungary | MTVA | Duna | All shows | Krisztina Rátonyi and Freddie | |
| Iceland | RÚV | RÚV | All shows | Gísli Marteinn Baldursson | |
| Iceland | RÚV | RÚV 2 | Semi-finals | Alex Elliott | |
| Iceland | RÚV | RÚV.is | Final | Alex Elliott | |
| Ireland | RTÉ | RTÉ2 | Semi-finals | Marty Whelan | |
| Ireland | RTÉ | RTÉ One | Final | Marty Whelan | |
| Ireland | RTÉ | RTÉ Radio 1 | SF2 | Neil Doherty and Zbyszek Zalinski | |
| Ireland | RTÉ | RTÉ 2fm | Final | Neil Doherty and Zbyszek Zalinski | |
| Israel | IPBC | Kan 11, Kan 88 | All shows | Sharon Taicher and Eran Zarachowicz | |
| Italy | RAI | Rai 4, Rai Radio 2 | Semi-finals | Federico Russo and Ema Stokholma | |
| Italy | RAI | Rai 1 | Final | Federico Russo and Flavio Insinna | |
| Italy | RAI | Rai Radio 2 | Final | Ema Stokholma and Gino Castaldo | |
| Latvia | LTV | LTV1 | All shows | Toms Grēviņš and Ketija Šēnberga | |
| Lithuania | LRT | LRT televizija, LRT Radijas | All shows | Darius Užkuraitis and Gerūta Griniūtė | |
| Malta | PBS | | SF2/Final | Unknown | |
| Moldova | TRM | Moldova 1 | All shows | Unknown | |
| Montenegro | RTCG | TVCG 1, TVCG 2, TVCG Sat | All shows | Dražen Bauković and Tijana Mišković | |
| Netherlands | AVROTROS | NPO 1 | All shows | Jan Smit and Cornald Maas | |
| Netherlands | AVROTROS | NPO Radio 2 | Final | Wouter van der Goes and Frank van 't Hof | |
| North Macedonia | MRT | MRT 1 | All shows | Toni Cifrovski | |
| Norway | NRK | NRK1 | All shows | Olav Viksmo-Slettan | |
| Norway | NRK | NRK3 | Final | Ronny Brede Aase, Silje Nordnes and Markus Neby | |
| Norway | NRK | NRK P1 | Final | Ole-Christian Øen | |
| Poland | TVP | TVP1, TVP Polonia | All shows | Artur Orzech | |
| Portugal | RTP | RTP1, RTP Internacional | All shows | José Carlos Malato and Nuno Galopim | |
| Romania | TVR | TVR 1, TVR HD, TVRi | All shows | Liana Stanciu and Bogdan Stănescu | |
| Russia | RTR | Russia-1, Russia HD | All shows | Dmitry Guberniev and Olga Shelest | |
| San Marino | SMRTV | San Marino RTV, Radio San Marino | All shows | Lia Fiorio and Gigi Restivo | |
| Serbia | RTS | RTS1, RTS HD, RTS Svet | SF1/Final | Duška Vučinić | |
| Serbia | RTS | RTS1, RTS HD, RTS Svet | SF2 | Tamara Petković and Katarina Epstein | |
| Serbia | RTS | Radio Belgrade 1 | Final | Nikoleta Dojčinović and Katarina Epstein | |
| Slovenia | RTVSLO | TV SLO 2 | Semi-finals | Andrej Hofer | |
| Slovenia | RTVSLO | TV SLO 1 | Final | Andrej Hofer | |
| Spain | RTVE | La 2 | Semi-finals | Tony Aguilar and Julia Varela | |
| Spain | RTVE | La 1 | Final | Tony Aguilar and Julia Varela | |
| Spain | RTVE | Radio Nacional, Radio 5, Radio Exterior | Final | Daniel Galindo | |
| Sweden | SVT | SVT1 | All shows | Charlotte Perrelli and Edward af Sillén | |
| Sweden | SVT | SR P4 | All shows | Carolina Norén and Björn Kjellman | |
| Switzerland | SRG SSR | SRF zwei | Semi-finals | Sven Epiney | |
| Switzerland | SRG SSR | SRF 1 | Final | Sven Epiney | |
| Switzerland | SRG SSR | RTS Deux | Semi-finals | Jean-Marc Richard and Nicolas Tanner | |
| Switzerland | SRG SSR | RTS Un | Final | Jean-Marc Richard, Nicolas Tanner and Bastian Baker | |
| Switzerland | SRG SSR | RSI La 2 | SF2 | Clarissa Tami and Sebalter | |
| Switzerland | SRG SSR | RSI La 1 | Final | Clarissa Tami and Sebalter | |
| United Kingdom | BBC | BBC Four | Semi-finals | Scott Mills and Rylan Clark-Neal | |
| United Kingdom | BBC | BBC One | Final | Graham Norton | |
| United Kingdom | BBC | BBC Radio 2 | Final | Ken Bruce | |

Broadcasters and commentators in non-participating countries
| Country/Territory | Broadcaster | Channel(s) | Show(s) | Commentator(s) | Ref(s) |
|---|---|---|---|---|---|
| Canada | Omni Television | | All shows | No commentary | (Note: Omni Television aired all three shows on a six hour delay with no commentary.) |
| Kazakhstan | Khabar | Khabar TV | All shows | Kaldybek Zhaysanbay and Mahabbat Esen | |
| Kosovo | RTK | | All shows | Alma Bektashi and Agron Krasniqi | |
| Slovakia | RTVS | Rádio FM | Final | Daniel Baláž, Pavol Hubinák and Juraj Malíček | |
| Ukraine | UA:PBC | UA:First | All shows | Timur Miroshnychenko | |
| Ukraine | STB | | All shows | Serhiy Prytula | |
| United States | WJFD-FM | | Final | Ewan Spence, Samantha Ross and Bernardo Pereira | |
| United States | Netflix | | All shows | No commentary | (Note: Netflix, an over-the-top video on demand service, signed an agreement with the EBU in July 2019 that would allow it to distribute the 2019 contest on its service in the United States. All three shows were made available on the platform from 22 July 2019 to May 2020 with no commentary.) |

== Incidents and controversies ==
=== Shabbat conflicts ===
On 14 May 2018, Yaakov Litzman, leader of the ultra-Orthodox party United Torah Judaism and Israel's former Minister of Health, drafted a letter to the Ministers of Tourism, Communications, and Culture and Sports, in which he requested the event not violate religious laws: "In the name of hundreds of thousands of Jewish citizens from all the populations and communities for whom Shabbat observance is close to their hearts, I appeal to you, already at this early stage, before production and all the other details of the event has begun, to be strict [in ensuring] that this matter does not harm the holiness of Shabbat and to work in every way to prevent the desecration of Shabbat, God forbid, as the law and the status quo requires". According to Jewish religious law, Shabbat is observed from just before sunset on Friday evening until Saturday night. The Saturday evening broadcast of the final, which were to start at 22:00 local time, would not conflict with this. However, the Friday evening jury show and Saturday afternoon rehearsals would. Similar protests arose in the lead-up to the 1999 contest held in Jerusalem, but then there were fewer competing delegations, which allowed for certain adjustments to be made to accommodate the issue. The chairman of the Eurovision Song Contest Reference Group (the contest's executive board), Frank-Dieter Freiling, noted that he was aware of the tension, and had plans to address it in his communications with host broadcaster Kan. Shalva Band, who performed as the interval act during the second semi-final, withdrew from Israel's national final citing similar concerns on possibly performing during Shabbat in the rehearsals for the final, should they have won.

=== Calls for boycott ===
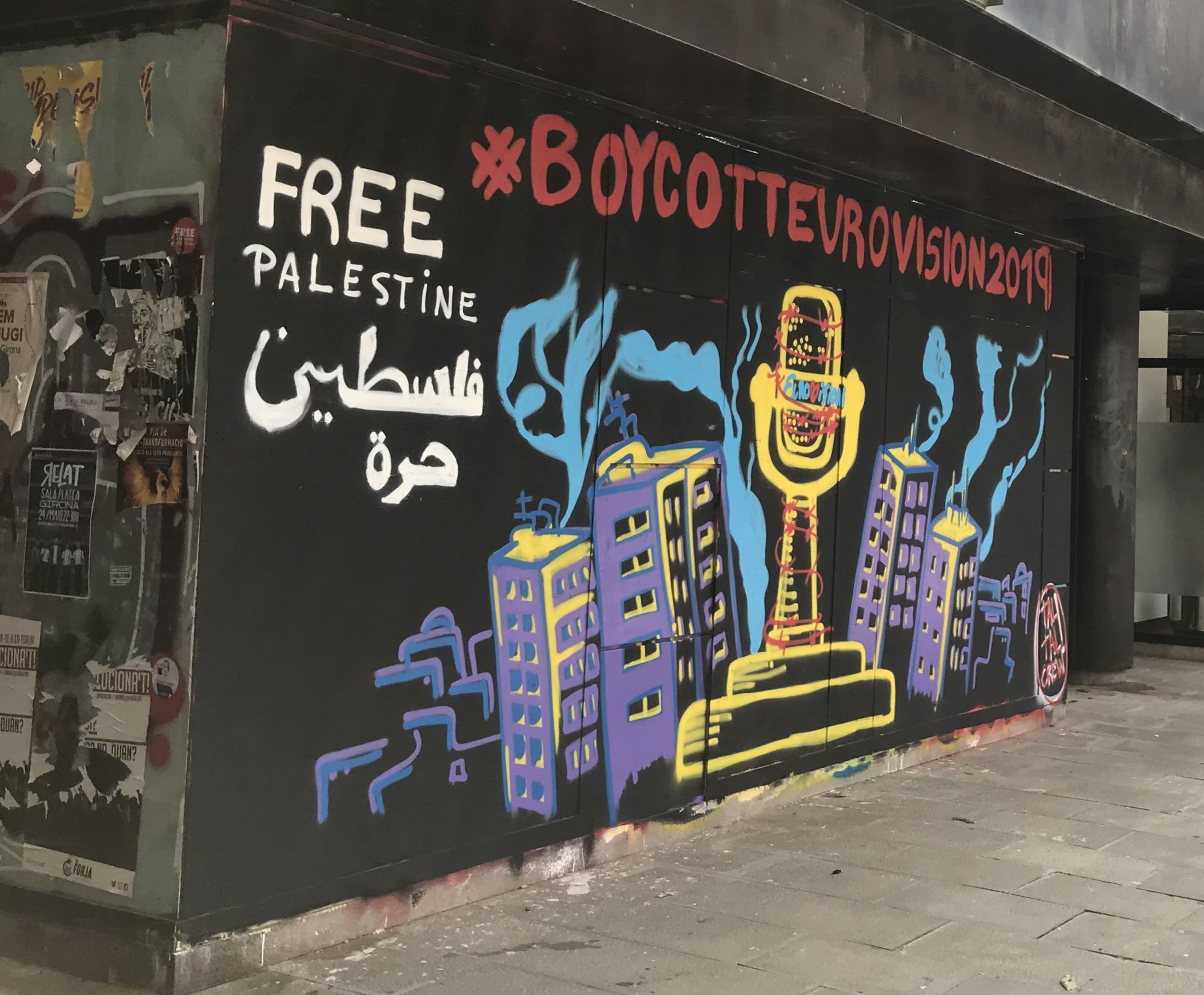
A mural in Girona promoting a boycott of the 2019 contest

Israel's win in the 2018 contest which earned it the right to host in 2019, and the possibility of Jerusalem being the host city for a third time, led proponents of the Boycott, Divestment and Sanctions (BDS) movement to call on their national broadcasters to boycott the competition due to Israel's policies towards Palestinians in the West Bank and Gaza. These included members of the Australian Greens party, Sinn Féin, Sweden's Left Party, and many entertainers including Charlie McGettigan, who won the contest for Ireland in 1994 alongside Paul Harrington. The Icelandic broadcaster RÚV met to discuss a boycott in response to a petition of 23,000 signatures, but ultimately neither RÚV nor any other broadcaster withdrew from the contest in response to boycott calls. In the event, viewing figures for the contest dropped to the joint lowest level since 2013.

Several national selections were disrupted by BDS supporters calling for a boycott in the lead-up to the contest. This included the second semi-final of France's Destination Eurovision, which was invaded by stage intruders who held up signs advocating a boycott; and selection events in Spain, Germany, Denmark and Norway were all targeted by protesters outside the venues calling for a boycott. The EBU later sent a special letter to all participating broadcasters advising precautions they could take to prevent similar disruptions. An opinion piece in the Swedish newspaper Aftonbladet, calling for a boycott of the contest and other cultural exchanges with Israel, was signed by 171 Swedish professionals in the cultural sector.

In March 2019, LGBT activist groups Al Qaws and Pinkwatching Israel called for a boycott of the contest in opposition to Israeli "pinkwashing". In late April, over 100 celebrities including Stephen Fry and Sharon Osbourne signed a joint statement against a boycott, asserting that any cultural boycott would be antithetical to advancing peace in the region.

=== Late Ukrainian withdrawal ===
During the final of the Ukrainian national selection on 23 February 2019, it was announced that the Public Broadcasting Company of Ukraine (UA:PBC) had reserved the right to change the decision made by the jury and the Ukrainian public. Following Maruv's win, it was reported the broadcaster had sent a contract to her management, requiring her to cancel all upcoming appearances and performances in Russia to represent Ukraine. She was also given 48 hours to sign the contract or be replaced.

On 24 February 2019, Maruv revealed the contract sent to her by UA:PBC had also banned her from improvising on stage and communicating with any journalist without the permission of the broadcaster, and required her to fully comply with any requests from the broadcaster. Later, the broadcaster published a statement explaining every entry of the contract. If she failed to follow any of these clauses, she would be fined ₴2 million (~€65,500). Maruv also said the broadcaster would not give her any financial compensation for the competition and would not pay for her trip to Tel Aviv.

On 25 February 2019, both Maruv and UA:PBC confirmed she would not represent Ukraine in the contest due to disputes over the contract, and that another act would be chosen. National final runner-up Freedom Jazz announced on 26 February they had also rejected the broadcaster's offer to represent Ukraine as did third-place finisher Kazka the following day. The incident garnered media coverage from major international outlets, including The New York Times, The Washington Post, Billboard, The Telegraph, The Independent, SBS News, The Irish Independent, Le Figaro, Cosmopolitan, and ABC. On 27 February, UA:PBC announced its withdrawal from the contest due to the inability to select a representative from the other participants of the national final.

=== Ticket sales controversy ===
The ticket prices for 2019 sparked criticism, both in Israel and abroad, with The Times of Israel calling them "likely the most expensive ever for Eurovision". Explanations for the high prices included the high cost of living in Israel and the fact that the Israeli government was not subsidising the Eurovision production. Although the venue could hold up to 10,000 people, only 7,300 seats were available because of the size of the stage, the technical equipment and the security features. Of those 7,300 seats, 3,000 had been reserved for the EBU, leaving only 4,300 for fans so that demand exceeded supply.

On 3 March 2019, ticket sales were frozen due to irregularities noticed by the oversight committee of Kan. Israeli media reported that tickets were being illegally resold for more than twice their original price. The Israeli public security minister, Gilad Erdan, ordered an investigation into the situation. Ticket sales resumed on 14 March; according to Kan, 220 improperly-purchased tickets to the final live show were revoked and sold again in the second round of sales.

=== Technical issues ===
==== Cyber attack during semi-final 1 ====
Kan suffered a cyber attack by a group of hackers that affected the broadcaster's accessibility livestreams of the first semi-final. The hackers were able to briefly show anti-Israel statements on the streams such as "Israel is not safe, you will see" and "Risk of missile attack, please take shelter". The incident was investigated by both the broadcaster and the EBU. Kan released a statement regarding the incident saying: "The problem was fixed quickly, and it seems that during the first semi-finals a site was hacked here for a few minutes, and we believe that the messages were not seen by many people."

==== Semi-final 1 technical issues ====
Multiple broadcasters reported various technical issues during the live broadcast of the first semi-final. Viewers reported a loss of commentary from Tel Aviv in the Netherlands and North Macedonia. The Polish broadcaster, TVP, had to replace its commentator Artur Orzech, who was in Tel Aviv, with another based in Warsaw because viewers were unable to hear Orzech. Germany and the United Kingdom lost a portion of the show. On BBC Four, which broadcast the semi-finals in the UK, the programme cut out as the recap of the qualifiers of the first semi-final began to play, and was replaced by the message "We are sorry for the break in this programme and are trying to correct the fault". The French broadcaster France Télévisions experienced audio issues during the Portuguese and Belgian performances. Similar issues arose during the 2011 contest.

==== Keiino's jury final performance ====
During Norway's jury final performance, two technical issues occurred in a short time. The screen turned black while Keiino performed their song "Spirit in the Sky". When the picture returned the camera operator was seen in the picture. NRK complained to the EBU and requested a new run through, but the EBU rejected the complaints.

=== Jury vote issues ===
Following the reveal of the detailed jury voting, it emerged that three jurors appeared to have voted backwards in their semi-finals. In the first semi-final, Czech juror Jitka Zelenková ranked Portugal as her favourite entry, Slovenia as her least-favourite entry, and ranked Estonia as fourteenth on her list; this was directly opposite to the other Czech jurors, who all ranked Slovenia first and two who ranked Portugal last. In the final, Zelenková's rankings changed significantly; she listed Estonia as her fourth favourite and Slovenia as her sixth favourite. Neither Zelenková, the Czech broadcaster Česká televize (ČT) nor the EBU had confirmed that her semi-final votes were reversed, but if this were corrected, Poland would have qualified to the final instead of Belarus.

Swedish juror Lina Hedlund also appeared to have voted backwards in the second semi-final. She ranked the Netherlands and Switzerland as her favourite entries in the final, but ranked them as her two least-favourite entries in the semi-final. Additionally, Hedlund ranked Austria her favourite entry in the semi-final, which led Austria to receive eight points from Sweden. Neither Hedlund, the Swedish broadcaster Sveriges Television (SVT) nor the EBU had commented on the incident.

The second semi-final also seemed to have had Russian juror Igor Gulyaev casting his votes in reverse order. In the semi-final, Gulyaev ranked Denmark first and Azerbaijan last, although he reversed these placements in the final. He also ranked Albania as his second least favourite entry in the semi-final, but conversely as his second favourite in the final. If his and Hedlund's votes were corrected, it would have had no impact on the result other than minor differences in the number of points received by each country.

This was the second year in which a juror accidentally submitted their votes backwards. In the 2016 contest, Danish juror Hilda Heick ranked the entries backwards, resulting in Denmark awarding 12 points to Ukraine instead of Australia.

=== Political demonstrations during the final ===
The organisation of the 2019 contest in Israel faced protests due to the Israeli–Palestinian conflict, and not exclusively outside the venue.

During Madonna's interval performance in the final, the singer directed a monologue (part of her song "Dark Ballet") to backup dancers wearing gas masks between the two songs, alluding to the "[storm] inside of us", saying "they think we are not aware of their crimes. We know, but we're just not ready to act". This was interpreted as a reference to the conflict. During "Future", two dancers—one wearing an Israeli, the other a Palestinian flag on the back of their costumes—were seen holding each other while guest vocalist Quavo sang the lyrics: "Not everyone is coming to the future, not everyone is learning from the past". Madonna later stated that the use of Israeli and Palestinian flags was not a pro-Palestine demonstration, but a call for unity and peace.

While receiving their points from the televotes, members of the Icelandic entry Hatari were seen showing banners that included the Palestinian flag. There had previously been concerns that the self-described anti-capitalist group would use their performance to protest the Israeli occupation of Palestinian territory, and the band had previously received warnings from the EBU about statements they had made prior to the contest. Following the flag incident, the EBU stated that "the consequences of this action [would] be discussed by the Reference Group after the Contest". Hatari subsequently announced a collaboration with Palestinian singer Bashar Murad for their next single. The Icelandic broadcaster RÚV was eventually handed a €5,000-fine for the incident. The incident was retained on the official replay of the final on YouTube, but was edited out on the DVD and Netflix releases.

== Other awards ==
In addition to the main winner's trophy, the Marcel Bezençon Awards and the Barbara Dex Award were contested during the 2019 Eurovision Song Contest. The OGAE, "General Organisation of Eurovision Fans" voting poll also took place before the contest.

=== Marcel Bezençon Awards ===
The Marcel Bezençon Awards, organised since 2002 by Sweden's Head of Delegation and 1992 representative Christer Björkman, and 1984 winner Richard Herrey, honours songs in the contest's final. The awards are divided into three categories: Artistic Award, Composers Award, and Press Award. The winners were revealed shortly before the Eurovision final on 18 May.

| Category | Country | Song | Artist | Songwriter(s) |
|---|---|---|---|---|
| Artistic Award | Australia | "Zero Gravity" | Kate Miller-Heidke | Kate Miller-Heidke; Keir Nuttall; Julian Hamilton |
| Composers Award | Italy | "Soldi" | Mahmood | Alessandro Mahmoud; Dario "Dardust" Faini; Charlie Charles |
| Press Award | Netherlands | "Arcade" | Duncan Laurence | Duncan de Moor; Joel Sjöö; Wouter Hardy; Will Knox |

=== OGAE ===
OGAE, an organisation of over forty Eurovision Song Contest fan clubs across Europe and beyond, conducts an annual voting poll first held in 2002 as the Marcel Bezençon Fan Award. After all votes were cast, the top-ranked entry in the 2019 poll was Italy's "Soldi" performed by Mahmood; the top five results are shown below.

| Country | Artist | Song | Points |
|---|---|---|---|
| Italy | Mahmood | "Soldi" | 411 |
| Switzerland | Luca Hänni | "She Got Me" | 406 |
| Netherlands | Duncan Laurence | "Arcade" | 401 |
| Norway | Keiino | "Spirit in the Sky" | 224 |
| Cyprus | Tamta | "Replay" | 218 |

=== Barbara Dex Award ===
The Barbara Dex Award is a humorous fan award given each year to the artist who wore the most notable outfit. First awarded in 1997, the award originally highlighted the worst-dressed artists in the competition, until this criterion was changed in 2019. Named after Belgium's representative who came last in the 1993 contest, wearing her self-designed dress, the award was handed by the fansite House of Eurovision from 1997 to 2016 and is being carried out by the fansite Songfestival.be since 2017.

| Place | Country | Artist |
|---|---|---|
| 1 | Portugal | Conan Osíris |
| 2 | Cyprus | Tamta |
| 3 | Belarus | Zena |
| 4 | Belgium | Eliot |
| 5 | North Macedonia | Tamara Todevska |

== Official album ==
Cover art of the official album

Eurovision Song Contest: Tel Aviv 2019 is the official compilation album of the contest, put together by the European Broadcasting Union and released by Universal Music Group digitally on 12 April 2019 and physically on 26 April 2019. The album features all 41 entries including the semi-finalists that failed to qualify for the final.

=== Charts ===
| Chart (2019) | Peak position |
|---|---|
| Australian Albums (ARIA) | 13 |
| German Compilation Albums (Offizielle Top 100) | 2 |
| Irish Compilation Albums (IRMA) | 2 |
| UK Compilation Albums (Official Charts) | 3 |

== See also ==
- Eurovision Choir 2019
- Junior Eurovision Song Contest 2019
