= Carousel (band) =

Latvian musical group

Background information
- Origin: Riga, Latvia
- Years active: 2015–present
- Members: Sabīne Žuga; Mārcis Vasiļevskis
- Past members: Mareks Logins; Staņislavs Judins

Carousel is a Latvian band that represented their country in the Eurovision Song Contest 2019 in Tel Aviv. The band was originally a duo consisting of founding members Sabīne Žuga and Mārcis Vasiļevskis. Staņislavs Judins (double bass) and Mareks Logins (drums) joined Carousel in 2019.

They were selected to represent Latvia in the 2019 contest after winning the country's national selection, Supernova. They performed their entry, "That Night", in the first half of the second semi-final in Tel Aviv, but failed to qualify from the semi-final.

== Discography ==
=== Extended plays ===
Title	Details
Sketches of Sleepless Nights	Released: 27 May 2019; Format: Digital download

=== Singles ===
Year	Title	Peak chart positions	Album
Year	Title	LTU	Album
"That Night"	2019	62	Sketches of Sleepless Nights

Awards and achievements
Preceded by Laura Rizzotto with "Funny Girl"	Latvia in the Eurovision Song Contest; 2019	Succeeded by Samanta Tīna with "Still Breathing"
