= Laura Rizzotto =

Brazilian singer-songwriter and guitarist (born 1994)

Background information
- Born: Laura de Carvalho Rizzotto; 18 July 1994 (age 32); Rio de Janeiro, Brazil
- Genre: pop
- Occupations: Singer-songwriter; guitarist; pianist
- Instruments: Vocals; guitar; ukulele; piano
- Years active: 2010–present
- Labels: Universal Music Brazil, Made in Rio Music
- Website: www.laurarizzotto.com

Laura de Carvalho Rizzotto (Latvian: Laura di Karvaļu Rizoto; born 18 July 1994) is a Latvian-Brazilian singer, songwriter, pianist and guitarist. She released her debut studio album Made in Rio in 2011 through Universal Music Brazil, which included the single "Friend in Me". In 2014, she independently released her second studio album Reason to Stay, and independently released the extended play RUBY in 2017.

Rizzotto represented Latvia in the Eurovision Song Contest 2018 in Lisbon, Portugal, with the song "Funny Girl".

== Early life and education ==
Rizzotto was born on 18 July 1994 in Rio de Janeiro, Brazil. Her father is a Brazilian of Latvian, Austrian and Italian descent, with his mother being born in Liepāja and raised in Riga, and her mother is Brazilian with Portuguese roots. She has an older brother and a younger sister. She is the great-granddaughter of Latvian aviator, Holocaust perpetrator and Nazi collaborator Herberts Cukurs.

Rizzotto and her family moved to the United States in 2005, and settled in Edina, Minnesota for a year. During that time, she learned to speak English. In 2006 she moved back to Brazil with her family and spent the rest of her childhood in Ipanema, Rio de Janeiro.

Rizzotto started studying music at 8 years old, taking classical piano lessons until she was 17. She also studied classical ballet for 8 years in the Escola Estadual de Dança Maria Olenewa, a dance conservatory in Rio. She competed as a ballet dancer until she decided to dedicate herself to music full-time. At 14 years old, she started taking her first singing lessons.

In 2012, Rizzotto received a scholarship to attend the prestigious Berklee College of Music in the US. She moved to the United States then to pursue her musical studies and an international career. In 2013, Rizzotto moved to Los Angeles to attend the California Institute of the Arts, graduating with a BFA degree in musical arts. Afterwards, she moved to New York City and received a master's degree in music from Columbia University in 2017.

== Career ==
Rizzotto began her professional music career at 15 years old, when she started doing her first professional shows as a singer/songwriter in her hometown, Rio de Janeiro. Shortly after, she signed her first record deal with Universal Music Brazil. She went on to release her debut studio album Made in Rio in 2011, which featured 15 original tracks (12 in English and 3 Portuguese versions) written by Rizzotto and some in partnership with her brother. The album was produced by Paul Ralphes and Eumir Deodato.

In 2012, Rizzotto performed as the opening act for Demi Lovato during her A Special Night with Demi Lovato performances in Brazil. Shortly after, she received a scholarship to attend Berklee College of Music in US, and moved to the United States to pursue an international career.

In 2013, Rizzotto moved to Los Angeles, California, to work on her sophomore album independently. She self-released her second studio album Reason to Stay. in 2014.

In 2015, Rizzotto began her studies at Columbia University, after being awarded a full scholarship for their Masters's program in Music. In 2017 she graduated with an MA in Music and Music Education. In 2016 to 2017, she worked as the Portuguese language coach for Jennifer Lopez after being hired by Sony Music.

In April 2017, Rizzotto was the moderator of the Music and Culture panel at the Brazil Conference, at Harvard University.

In 2018, Rizzotto self-released RUBY, her third solo project and first EP. Rizzotto also composed the soundtrack for "Where Thoughts Go", a multi-award-winning VR experience that was featured in many festivals around the world, including the Tribeca Film Festival. She also represented Latvia in the Riga Jazz Festival and was invited to perform at the United Nations.

In January 2018, Rizzotto participated and won first place in the Supernova 2018 contest, the National Latvian Selection for the Eurovision Song Contest 2018. She performed her winning song 'Funny Girl' at the Eurovision Song Contest in Lisbon, but failed to qualify for the grand final. She placed 12th in the semi-final with 106 points.

== Discography ==
=== Studio albums ===
List of studio albums, with selected chart positions
| Title | Album details | Peak chart positions |
| Title | Album details | BRA |
|---|---|---|
| Made in Rio | Released: 15 August 2011; Label: Universal Music Brazil; Formats: CD, digital download | — |
| Reason to Stay | Released: 16 January 2014; Label: Independent; Formats: CD, digital download | — |

=== Extended plays ===
List of extended plays, with selected chart positions
| Title | Extended play details | Peak chart positions |
| Title | Extended play details | BRA |
|---|---|---|
| RUBY | Released: 30 October 2017; Label: Independent; Formats: Streaming | — |

=== Singles ===
List of singles as lead artist, with selected chart positions, showing year released and album name
| Title | Year | Peak chart positions | | Album |
| Title | Year | LVA | BRA | Album |
|---|---|---|---|---|
| "Friend in Me" | 2011 | — | — | Made in Rio |
| "When I Look In Your Eyes" | 2011 | 30 | — | Made in Rio |
| "Reason to Stay" | 2014 | — | — | Reason to Stay |
| "Teardrops" | 2014 | — | — | Reason to Stay |
| "Love It (The World Cup Song)" | 2014 | — | — | Non-album single |
| "The High" | 2017 | — | — | RUBY |
| "Cherry on Top" | 2017 | — | — | RUBY |
| "Red Flags" | 2017 | — | — | RUBY |
| "Funny Girl" | 2017 | 10 | — | Non-album single |
| "Bonjour" | 2018 | 3 | — | RUBY |
| "Tightrope" | 2019 | 1 | — | Non-album single |
| "One More Night" | 2019 | — | — | Non-album single |
| "Papaya" | 2023 | — | — | Non-album single |
| "Symptoms" | 2024 | — | — | Non-album single |

Awards and achievements
| Preceded by Triana Park with "Line" | Latvia in the Eurovision Song Contest; 2018 | Succeeded by Carousel with "That Night" |
