= That Night (song) =

2019 song by Carousel

Single by Carousel

from the EP Sketches of Sleepless Nights
- Released: 22 March 2019
- Recorded: 2018
- Length: 3:01
- Label: Universal Music
- Songwriter(s): Aleksandrs Volks; Mārcis Vasiļevskis; Sabīne Žuga

Eurovision Song Contest 2019 entry
- Country: Latvia
- Artist(s): Carousel
- Language: English
- Composer(s): Mārcis Vasiļevskis, Aleksandrs Volks
- Lyricist(s): Sabīne Žuga

Finals performance
- Semi-final result: 15th
- Semi-final points: 50
- Final result: Did not qualify

Entry chronology
- ◄ "Funny Girl" (2018)
- "Still Breathing" (2020) ►

"That Night" is a song performed by Latvian band Carousel. It represented Latvia in the Eurovision Song Contest 2019 on 16 May 2019. It was performed at the second semi-final, but did not qualify for the final.

== Eurovision Song Contest ==
The song represented Latvia in the Eurovision Song Contest 2019, after Carousel were selected through Supernova 2019, the music competition that selects Latvia's entries for the Eurovision Song Contest. On 28 January 2019, a special allocation draw was held which placed each country into one of the two semi-finals, as well as which half of the show they would perform in. Latvia was placed into the second semi-final, to be held on 16 May 2019, and was scheduled to perform in the first half of the show. Once all the competing songs for the 2019 contest had been released, the running order for the semi-finals was decided by the show's producers rather than through another draw, so that similar songs were not placed next to each other. Latvia performed in position 5. The entry did not qualify for the final.

== Charts ==
Chart (2019)	Peak position
Lithuania (AGATA)	62
