= North Macedonia in the Eurovision Song Contest 2019 =

- Eurovision Song Contest 2019
- Country: North Macedonia
- Selection process: Internal selection
- Announcement date: Artist: 25 January 2019; Song: 8 March 2019

Competing entry
- Song: "Proud"
- Artist: Tamara Todevska
- Songwriters: Darko Dimitrov; Robert Bilbilov; Lazar Cvetkoski; Kosta Petrov; Sanja Popovska

Placement
- Semi-final result: Qualified (2nd, 239 points)
- Final result: 7th, 305 points

Participation chronology

North Macedonia was represented at the Eurovision Song Contest 2019 with the song "Proud" written by Darko Dimitrov, Robert Bilbilov, Lazar Cvetkoski, Kosta Petrov and Sanja Popovska. The song was performed by Tamara Todevska, who was internally selected by the Macedonian broadcaster Macedonian Radio Television (MRT) to compete for Macedonia at the 2019 contest in Tel Aviv, Israel. Todevska previously represented Macedonia in the Eurovision Song Contest 2008 with the song "Let Me Love You" together with Vrčak and Adrijan but failed to qualify to the final. Tamara Todevska's appointment as the Macedonian representative was announced on 25 January 2019, while her song, "Proud", was presented to the public on 8 March 2019.

North Macedonia was drawn to compete in the second semi-final of the Eurovision Song Contest which took place on 16 May 2019. Performing during the show in position 17, "Proud" was announced among the top 10 entries of the second semi-final and therefore qualified to compete in the final on 18 May. It was later revealed that North Macedonia placed second out of the 18 participating countries in the semi-final with 239 points. In the final, North Macedonia performed in position 8 and placed seventh out of the 26 participating countries, scoring 305 points. This was North Macedonia's first top ten placement and also the highest placement ever for North Macedonia in the history of the contest.

== Background ==
Prior to the 2019 contest, Macedonia had participated in the Eurovision Song Contest eighteen times since its first entry in 1998 under the provisional appellation "former Yugoslav Republic of Macedonia", abbreviated "FYR Macedonia". The nation's best result in the contest to this point was twelfth, which it achieved in 2006 with the song "Ninanajna" performed by Elena Risteska. Following the introduction of semi-finals for the 2004, Macedonia had featured in only five finals.

The Macedonian national broadcaster, Macedonian Radio Television (MRT), broadcasts the event within Macedonia and organises the selection process for the nation's entry. MRT confirmed their intentions to participate at the 2019 Eurovision Song Contest on 21 September 2018. Between 2008 and 2011, Macedonia selected their entries using the national final Skopje Fest. During this period, the nation failed to qualify to the final on every occasion. Between 2012 and 2014, the broadcaster internally selected Macedonia's entry, resulting in a single qualification to the final during this period in 2012. After failing to qualify in 2015 where Skopje Fest was used as a national final, the broadcaster internally selected the nation's entry since 2016. All entries failed to bring the country to the final, including in 2018 with Eye Cue and the song "Lost and Found". For 2019, the broadcaster again opted to internally select the Macedonian entry.

== Before Eurovision ==
=== Internal selection ===
On 25 January 2019, MRT announced that they had internally selected Tamara Todevska to represent Macedonia in Tel Aviv. Todevska previously competed in the contest in 2008 where she performed the song "Let Me Love You" together with Vrčak and Adrijan but failed to qualify for the final. Todevska had also attempted to represent Macedonia at the Eurovision Song Contest on several occasions. Her earliest attempt was in 2005 when she failed to qualify from the first phase of the national final selection. She later competed in the national finals in 2007 with the song "Kaži koj si ti" and in 2015 with the song "Brod što tone", both of which placed second.

On 9 February 2019, it was announced that Tamara Todevska would perform the song "Proud" at the Eurovision Song Contest 2019. "Proud" was originally scheduled to be presented to the public on 4 March 2019 through the release of the official music video via the official Eurovision Song Contest's YouTube channel, however it was delayed to 8 March 2019 to coincide with International Women's Day. The song, composed by Darko Dimitrov, Robert Bilbilov and Lazar Cvetkoski with lyrics written by Kosta Petrov and Sanja Popovska, was selected by a four-member committee consisting of Aneta Andonova (MRT), Meri Popova (MRT 1), Avni Qahili (MRT 2) and Toni Cifrovski (Radio Skopje) from several proposals that MRT received from composers.

I dedicate "Proud" to my daughter and to everyone out there fighting for their dreams and believing in their greatness. On the 16th of May, we will break the rules and at least for one night in the year, we will show the world that I AM PROUD is always stronger than their YOU WILL NEVER BE GOOD ENOUGH!

— Tamara Todevska

== At Eurovision ==
According to Eurovision rules, all nations with the exceptions of the host country and the "Big Five" (France, Germany, Italy, Spain and the United Kingdom) are required to qualify from one of two semi-finals in order to compete for the final; the top ten countries from each semi-final progress to the final. The European Broadcasting Union (EBU) split up the competing countries into six different pots based on voting patterns from previous contests, with countries with favourable voting histories put into the same pot. On 28 January 2019, a special allocation draw was held which placed each country into one of the two semi-finals, as well as which half of the show they would perform in. North Macedonia was placed into the second semi-final, to be held on 16 May 2019, and was scheduled to perform in the second half of the show.

Once all the competing songs for the 2019 contest had been released, the running order for the semi-finals was decided by the shows' producers rather than through another draw, so that similar songs were not placed next to each other. North Macedonia was set to perform in position 17, following the entry from Netherlands and before the entry from Azerbaijan.

The two semi-finals and final were broadcast in North Macedonia on MRT 1 with commentary by Toni Cifrovski. The Macedonian spokesperson, who announced the top 12-point score awarded by the Macedonian jury during the final, was Nikola Trajkovski.

=== Semi-final ===
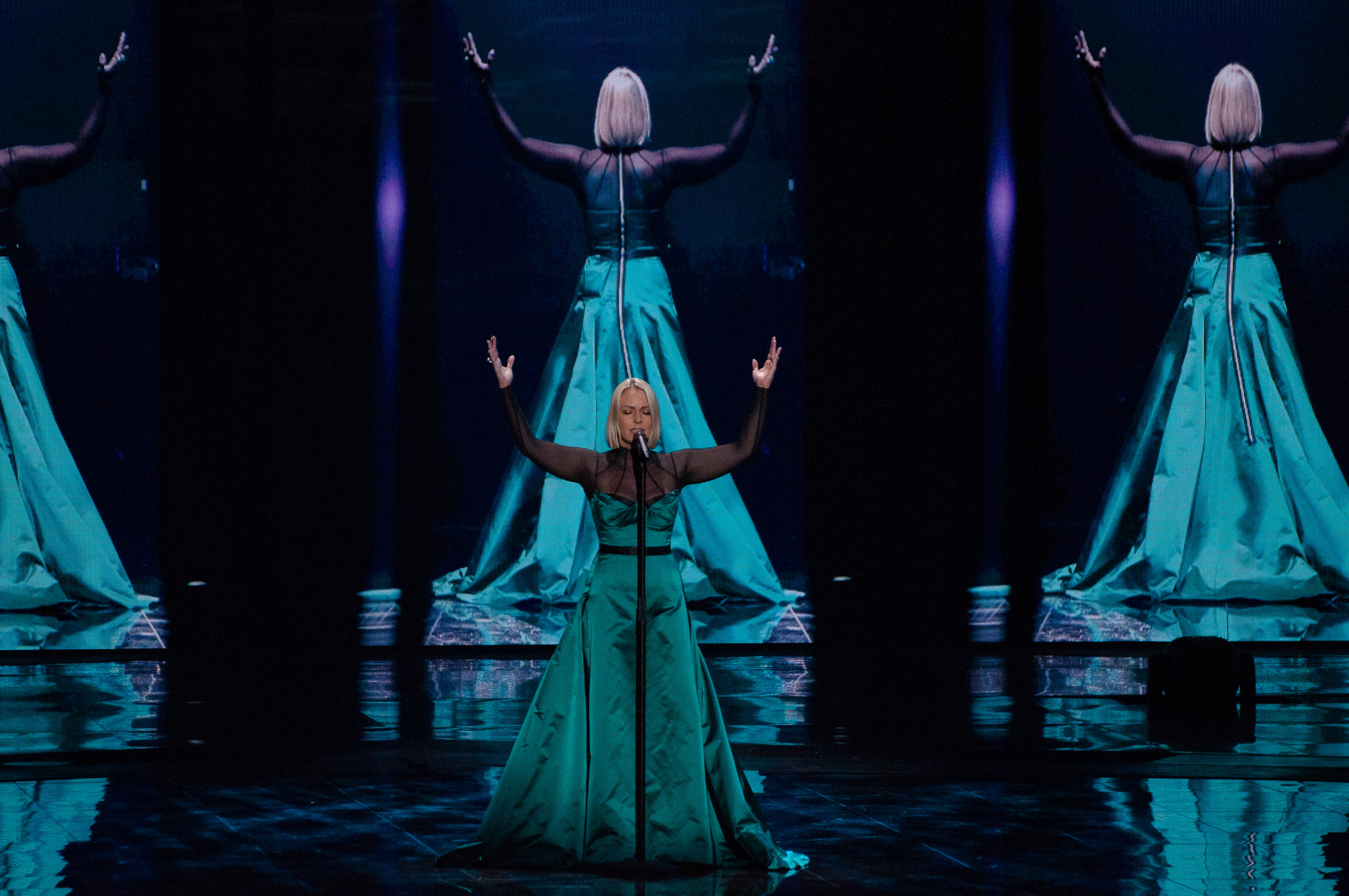
Tamara Todevska during a rehearsal before the second semi-final

Tamara Todevska took part in technical rehearsals on 7 and 11 May, followed by dress rehearsals on 15 and 16 May. This included the jury show on 15 May where the professional juries of each country watched and voted on the competing entries.

The Macedonian performance featured Tamara Todevska performing alone on stage in a full-length emerald green dress with black tulle on the upper top part, designed by Aleksandar Noshpal. The stage colours were predominately purple and blue with white lighting and the background LED screens displayed a mirror effect that showed the back of Todevska, monochrome images of women and girls as well as the picture of Todevska holding her daughter at the end. The artistic directors for the Macedonian performance were Mari Forsman Ryberger and Tine Matulessy. Tamara Todevska was also joined by three off-stage backing vocalists: Aleksandra Janeva, Antonia Gigovska and Vasil Garvanliev. Garvanliev would go on to represent North Macedonia in the Eurovision Song Contest 2021.

At the end of the show, North Macedonia was announced as having finished in the top 10 and subsequently qualifying for the grand final. It was later revealed that North Macedonia placed second in the semi-final, receiving a total of 239 points: 84 points from the televoting and 155 points from the juries.

=== Final ===
Shortly after the second semi-final, a winner's press conference was held for the ten qualifying countries. As part of this press conference, the qualifying artists took part in a draw to determine which half of the grand final they would subsequently participate in. This draw was done in the order the countries were announced during the semi-final. North Macedonia was drawn to compete in the first half. Following this draw, the shows' producers decided upon the running order of the final, as they had done for the semi-finals. North Macedonia was subsequently placed to perform in position 8, following the entry from San Marino and before the entry from Sweden.

Tamara Todevska once again took part in dress rehearsals on 17 and 18 May before the final, including the jury final where the professional juries cast their final votes before the live show. Tamara Todevska performed a repeat of her semi-final performance during the final on 18 May. North Macedonia placed seventh in the final, scoring 305 points: 58 points from the televoting and 247 points from the juries.

=== Voting ===
Voting during the three shows involved each country awarding two sets of points from 1-8, 10 and 12: one from their professional jury and the other from televoting. Each nation's jury consisted of five music industry professionals who are citizens of the country they represent, with their names published before the contest to ensure transparency. This jury judged each entry based on: vocal capacity; the stage performance; the song's composition and originality; and the overall impression by the act. In addition, no member of a national jury was permitted to be related in any way to any of the competing acts in such a way that they cannot vote impartially and independently. The individual rankings of each jury member as well as the nation's televoting results were released shortly after the grand final.

Below is a breakdown of points awarded to North Macedonia and awarded by North Macedonia in the second semi-final and grand final of the contest, and the breakdown of the jury voting and televoting conducted during the two shows:

==== Points awarded to North Macedonia ====
Points awarded to North Macedonia (Semi-final 2)
Score	Televote	Jury
12 points	Croatia	Albania; Croatia; Germany; United Kingdom
10 points		Azerbaijan; Denmark; Moldova; Romania; Russia
8 points	Albania	Armenia; Austria; Switzerland
7 points	Azerbaijan; Switzerland	Italy; Norway
6 points	Armenia; Germany; Malta; Netherlands; Russia; Sweden	Ireland
5 points	Austria	Latvia
4 points	Romania	Netherlands
3 points		
2 points	Lithuania	Lithuania; Malta
1 point	Denmark; Italy; Norway	

Points awarded to North Macedonia (Final)
Score	Televote	Jury
12 points	Serbia; Slovenia	Albania; Austria; Moldova; Serbia; Switzerland; United Kingdom
10 points		Armenia; Belarus; Croatia; Denmark; Hungary; Italy; Norway
8 points		Azerbaijan; Iceland; Latvia; Poland
7 points	Croatia	Australia; Czech Republic; Finland; France; Germany; Montenegro; Romania
6 points	Albania; Montenegro	
5 points	Malta	Ireland; Portugal
4 points		Russia
3 points	Azerbaijan	Malta; Netherlands
2 points	Georgia; Sweden; Switzerland	Slovenia
1 point	Netherlands	Greece; San Marino

==== Points awarded by North Macedonia ====
Points awarded by North Macedonia (Semi-final 2)
Score	Televote	Jury
12 points	Albania	Albania
10 points	Croatia	Russia
8 points	Netherlands	Azerbaijan
7 points	Russia	Malta
6 points	Armenia	Netherlands
5 points	Azerbaijan	Switzerland
4 points	Malta	Sweden
3 points	Norway	Latvia
2 points	Switzerland	Armenia
1 point	Sweden	Romania

Points awarded by North Macedonia (Final)
Score	Televote	Jury
12 points	Albania	Italy
10 points	Serbia	Australia
8 points	San Marino	Albania
7 points	Netherlands	Netherlands
6 points	Malta	Russia
5 points	Norway	Malta
4 points	Switzerland	Azerbaijan
3 points	Italy	Switzerland
2 points	Slovenia	Iceland
1 point	Azerbaijan	Cyprus

==== Detailed voting results ====
The following members comprised North Macedonia's jury:

- Suzana Stefanovska (jury chairperson) – music editor, host
- Fjola Ismaili – cellist, singer
- Robert Vukelić – singer
- Hristina Mickovska (DJ Tina) – radio DJ
- Risto Apostolov – singer, songwriter, music producer

Detailed voting results from North Macedonia (Semi-final 2)
R/O	Country	Jury							Televote	
R/O	Country	S. Stefanovska	F. Ismaili	R. Vukelić	DJ Tina	R. Apostolov	Rank	Points	Rank	Points
01	Armenia	11	10	9	8	14	9	2	5	6
02	Ireland	10	12	17	14	9	13		14	
03	Moldova	12	16	11	13	15	16		15	
04	Switzerland	7	5	5	6	11	6	5	9	2
05	Latvia	17	9	13	9	6	8	3	16	
06	Romania	13	17	7	10	10	10	1	13	
07	Denmark	14	8	16	15	17	15		11	
08	Sweden	5	6	8	7	7	7	4	10	1
09	Austria	15	15	14	17	12	17		17	
10	Croatia	9	11	10	12	13	11		2	10
11	Malta	6	4	2	4	2	4	7	7	4
12	Lithuania	16	13	12	11	8	12		12	
13	Russia	2	2	1	5	3	2	10	4	7
14	Albania	3	1	3	2	1	1	12	1	12
15	Norway	8	14	15	16	16	14		8	3
16	Netherlands	1	7	6	3	5	5	6	3	8
17	North Macedonia									
18	Azerbaijan	4	3	4	1	4	3	8	6	5

Detailed voting results from North Macedonia (Final)
R/O	Country	Jury							Televote	
R/O	Country	S. Stefanovska	F. Ismaili	R. Vukelić	DJ Tina	R. Apostolov	Rank	Points	Rank	Points
01	Malta	6	6	5	5	5	6	5	5	6
02	Albania	5	1	6	3	4	3	8	1	12
03	Czech Republic	14	11	9	19	10	13		18	
04	Germany	17	18	16	24	11	18		22	
05	Russia	3	4	3	7	6	5	6	11	
06	Denmark	18	15	22	22	17	23		16	
07	San Marino	22	19	21	25	22	25		3	8
08	North Macedonia									
09	Sweden	11	9	14	13	12	12		14	
10	Slovenia	24	17	17	14	18	22		9	2
11	Cyprus	15	10	7	11	19	10	1	17	
12	Netherlands	1	8	2	4	8	4	7	4	7
13	Greece	10	16	10	10	14	11		20	
14	Israel	12	20	15	23	21	20		24	
15	Norway	9	14	23	18	16	15		6	5
16	United Kingdom	16	13	18	21	24	21		25	
17	Iceland	25	25	25	16	1	9	2	15	
18	Estonia	19	12	13	17	13	16		19	
19	Belarus	20	21	8	20	23	17		21	
20	Azerbaijan	7	5	12	8	7	7	4	10	1
21	France	21	24	24	9	25	19		23	
22	Italy	2	2	1	1	3	1	12	8	3
23	Serbia	13	22	20	12	9	14		2	10
24	Switzerland	8	7	11	6	15	8	3	7	4
25	Australia	4	3	4	2	2	2	10	13	
26	Spain	23	23	19	15	20	24		12	
