= Armenia in the Eurovision Song Contest 2019 =

- Eurovision Song Contest 2019
- Participating broadcaster: Public Television of Armenia (AMPTV)
- Country: Armenia
- Selection process: Internal selection
- Announcement date: Artist: 30 November 2018; Song: 10 March 2019

Competing entry
- Song: "Walking Out"
- Artist: Srbuk
- Songwriters: Lost Capital; tokionine; Garik Papoyan

Placement
- Semi-final result: Failed to qualify (16th)

Participation chronology

Armenia was represented at the Eurovision Song Contest 2019 with the song "Walking Out" written by Lost Capital, tokionine and Garik Papoyan. The song was performed by Srbuk, who was selected internally by the Armenian broadcaster Public Television Company of Armenia (AMPTV) to represent Armenia in the 2019 contest in Tel Aviv, Israel. Srbuk's selection as the Armenian artist was announced on 30 November 2018, while the song "Walking Out" was later presented to the public on 10 March 2019.

Armenia was drawn to compete in the second semi-final of the Eurovision Song Contest which took place on 16 May 2019. Performing as the opening entry for the show in position 1, "Walking Out" was not announced among the top 10 entries of the second semi-final and therefore did not qualify to compete in the final. It was later revealed that Armenia placed sixteenth out of the 18 participating countries in the semi-final with 49 points.

== Background ==
Prior to the 2019 contest, Armenia had participated in the Eurovision Song Contest twelve times since its first entry in 2006. Its highest placing in the contest, to this point, has been fourth place, which the nation achieved on two occasions: in 2008 with the song "Qélé, Qélé" performed by Sirusho and in 2014 with the song "Not Alone" performed by Aram Mp3. Armenia had, to this point, failed to qualify to the final on two occasions in 2011 and 2018, the latter with the song "Qami" performed by Sevak Khanagyan. The nation briefly withdrew from the contest in 2012 due to long-standing tensions with then host country Azerbaijan.

The Armenian national broadcaster, Public Television Company of Armenia (AMPTV), broadcasts the event within Armenia and organises the selection process for the nation's entry. AMPTV confirmed their intentions to participate at the 2019 Eurovision Song Contest on 15 October 2018. Armenia has used various methods to select the Armenian entry in the past, such as internal selections and a live televised national final to choose the performer, song or both to compete at Eurovision. Between 2014 and 2016, the broadcaster internally selected both the artist and the song, while the national final Depi Evratesil was organized in 2017 and 2018. The broadcaster opted to internally select the 2019 Armenian entry.

== Before Eurovision ==
=== Internal selection ===
The Armenian entry for the Eurovision Song Contest 2019 was internally selected by the AMPTV. On 28 November 2018, the broadcaster indicated that an artist had been selected and that their name would be announced on 30 November 2018. During the AMPTV programme Lav Yereko on 30 November, Srbuk was announced as the Armenian representative. In regards to her selection as the Armenian entrant, Srbuk stated: "I am grateful to the Public Television of Armenia for their trust. It's an honor to represent my country in front of the whole world! We have an amazing journey ahead of us, and I hope we'll succeed together!" Following their artist reveal, AMPTV announced a public call for song submissions with a deadline of 10 January 2019. AMPTV later announced in January 2019 that more than 300 songs were submitted by songwriters worldwide and that several songs were under consideration.

The song "Walking Out", composed by Lost Capital (Hovhannes Hovhannisyan and Ashot Petrosyan) and tokionine with lyrics by Garik Papoyan, was announced as the Armenian entry on 9 February 2019. Srbuk filmed the official video for the song prior to the presentation, which was a co-production between AMPTV and the company Factory Production, directed by Arthur Manukyan and featuring fashion designs by Ani Mesropyan. The song and video were presented to the public via the official Eurovision Song Contest's YouTube channel on 10 March 2019.

When I first heard the melody, visions flashed before my eyes. Events that haven't yet become memories… I realized that this fight and the collapse of the emotions inside me have to be reflected in my song. I want to tell myself and everybody else: "Don't kill love, but don't let it kill you".

— Srbuk

=== Promotion ===
Srbuk made several appearances across Europe to specifically promote "Walking Out" as the Armenian Eurovision entry. On 14 April, Srbuk performed during the Eurovision in Concert event which was held at the AFAS Live venue in Amsterdam, Netherlands and hosted by Edsilia Rombley and Marlayne. Srbuk also performed during the Eurovision Pre-Party Madrid event on 21 April which was held at the Sala La Riviera venue in Madrid, Spain and hosted by Tony Aguilar and Julia Varela. In addition to her international appearances, a piano cover of "Walking Out" was released on 14 April and featured Armenian jazz musician Vahagn Hayrapetyan.

== At Eurovision ==
All countries except the "Big Five" (France, Germany, Italy, Spain and the United Kingdom), and the host country, are required to qualify from one of two semi-finals in order to compete for the final; the top ten countries from each semi-final progress to the final. The European Broadcasting Union (EBU) split up the competing countries into six different pots based on voting patterns from previous contests, with countries with favourable voting histories put into the same pot. On 28 January 2019, a special allocation draw was held which placed each country into one of the two semi-finals, as well as which half of the show they would perform in. Armenia was placed into the second semi-final, to be held on 16 May 2019, and was scheduled to perform in the first half of the show.

Once all the competing songs for the 2016 contest had been released, the running order for the semi-finals was decided by the shows' producers rather than through another draw, so that similar songs were not placed next to each other. Armenia was set to open the show and perform in position 1, before the entry from Ireland.

In Armenia, the two semi-finals and the final were broadcast on Armenia 1 and Public Radio of Armenia with commentary by Aram Mp3, who had previously represented Armenia in the Eurovision Song Contest in 2014, and Avet Barseghyan. The Armenian spokesperson, who announced the top 12-point score awarded by the Armenian jury during the final, was Aram Mp3.

=== Semi-final ===
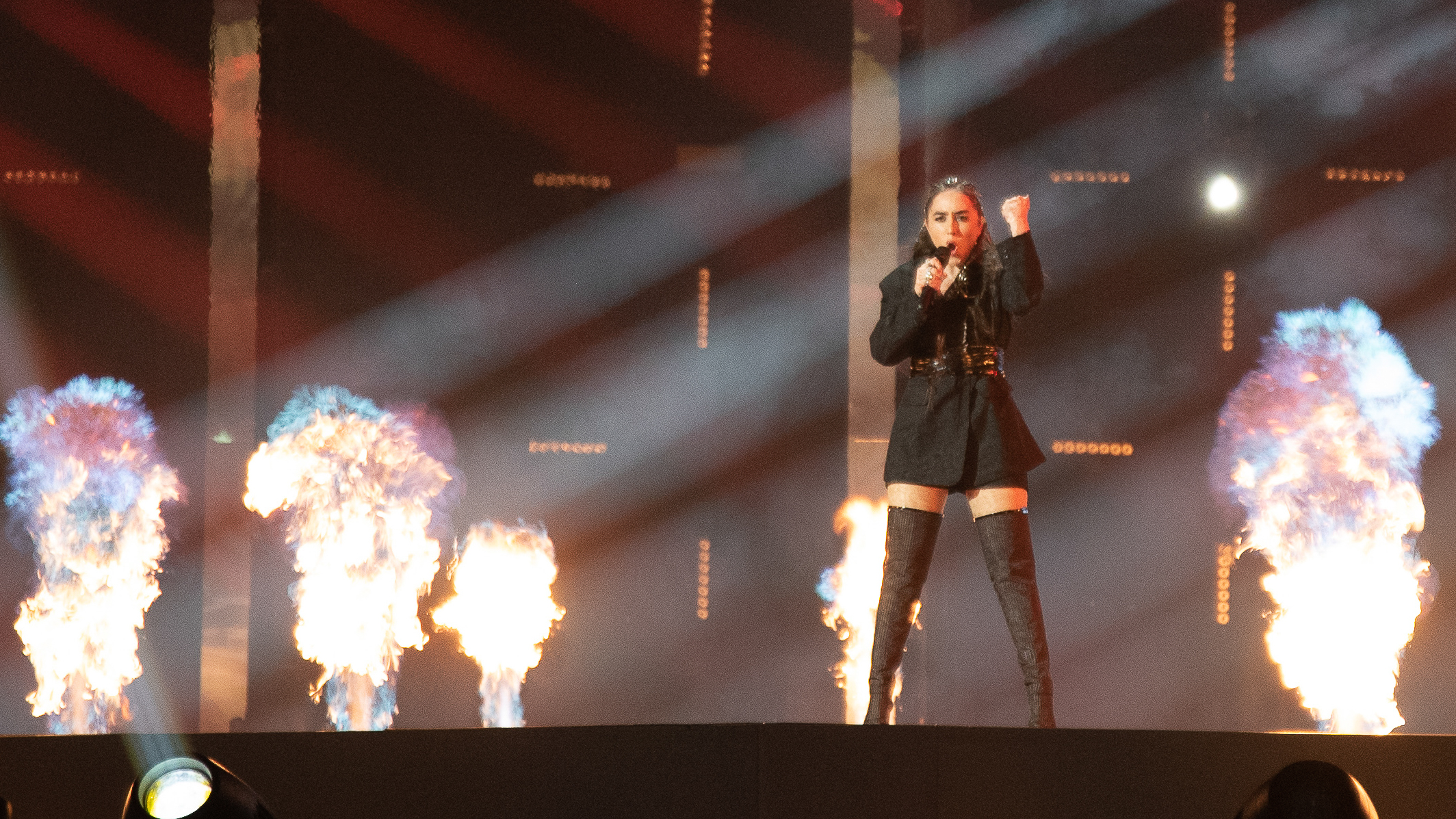
Srbuk during a rehearsal before the first semi-final

Srbuk took part in technical rehearsals on 6 and 10 May, followed by dress rehearsals on 15 and 16 May. This included the jury show on 15 May where the professional juries of each country watched and voted on the competing entries.

The Armenian performance featured Srbuk dressed in a black long length micro-dress with a waist belt and full length black boots performing alone on stage. The stage presentation included CGI effects such as broken glass and pyrotechnic flame effects throughout the performance. The LED screens projected sharp red lines and the stage lighting displayed black and red colours with white spotlights. During the performance, Srbuk appeared on stage with the audience disappearing; which was explained by the singer prior to the second semi-final: "During the culmination you will be surprised. I'm gonna be "alone" in the hall, without audience. This trick'll be used for the emotional tension to be even more powerful." Srbuk was joined by four off-stage backing vocalists: Arevik Grigoryan, the co-composer of "Walking Out" David Badalyan (tokionine), Julieta Grigoryan and Saro Gevorgyan.

At the end of the show, Armenia was not announced among the top 10 entries in the second semi-final and therefore failed to qualify to compete in the final. It was later revealed that Armenia placed sixteenth in the semi-final, receiving a total of 49 points: 23 points from the televoting and 26 points from the juries.

=== Voting ===
Voting during the three shows involved each country awarding two sets of points from 1-8, 10 and 12: one from their professional jury and the other from televoting. Each nation's jury consisted of five music industry professionals who are citizens of the country they represent, with their names published before the contest to ensure transparency. This jury judged each entry based on: vocal capacity; the stage performance; the song's composition and originality; and the overall impression by the act. In addition, no member of a national jury was permitted to be related in any way to any of the competing acts in such a way that they cannot vote impartially and independently. The individual rankings of each jury member as well as the nation's televoting results were released shortly after the grand final.

Below is a breakdown of points awarded to Armenia and awarded by Armenia in the first semi-final and grand final of the contest, and the breakdown of the jury voting and televoting conducted during the two shows:

==== Points awarded to Armenia ====
Points awarded to Armenia (Semi-final 2)
Score	Televote	Jury
12 points		
10 points	Russia	
8 points		
7 points		
6 points	North Macedonia	Malta; Russia
5 points	Netherlands	
4 points		Moldova
3 points		
2 points	Moldova	Ireland; Latvia; Netherlands; North Macedonia
1 point		Austria; Croatia

==== Points awarded by Armenia ====
Points awarded by Armenia (Semi-final 2)
Score	Televote	Jury
12 points	Russia	Sweden
10 points	Netherlands	Malta
8 points	Switzerland	North Macedonia
7 points	Malta	Russia
6 points	North Macedonia	Switzerland
5 points	Norway	Moldova
4 points	Sweden	Netherlands
3 points	Moldova	Latvia
2 points	Croatia	Romania
1 point	Denmark	Norway

Points awarded by Armenia (Final)
Score	Televote	Jury
12 points	Russia	Sweden
10 points	Netherlands	North Macedonia
8 points	Switzerland	Italy
7 points	Italy	Switzerland
6 points	Malta	Netherlands
5 points	Norway	Russia
4 points	France	Malta
3 points	Iceland	Czech Republic
2 points	Sweden	United Kingdom
1 point	Australia	Belarus

==== Detailed voting results ====
The following members comprised the Armenian jury:

- Ruben Shahinyan (jury chairperson) – music producer
- Erik Karapetyan (Erik) – singer, songwriter
- Sona Rubenyan – singer, songwriter
- Amalia Margaryan – singer
- Tigran Petrosyan

Detailed voting results from Armenia (Semi-final 2)
R/O	Country	Jury							Televote	
R/O	Country	Erik	R. Shahinyan	S. Rubenyan	A. Margaryan	T. Petrosyan	Rank	Points	Rank	Points
01	Armenia									
02	Ireland	16	10	11	14	11	11		16	
03	Moldova	5	9	4	5	4	6	5	8	3
04	Switzerland	4	6	5	6	3	5	6	3	8
05	Latvia	9	7	9	8	5	8	3	12	
06	Romania	7	8	6	10	8	9	2	17	
07	Denmark	13	13	12	12	13	14		10	1
08	Sweden	3	3	1	1	1	1	12	7	4
09	Austria	10	12	10	16	15	13		15	
10	Croatia	12	14	13	9	14	12		9	2
11	Malta	2	1	8	2	7	2	10	4	7
12	Lithuania	15	15	15	13	12	15		13	
13	Russia	1	2	3	7	9	4	7	1	12
14	Albania	14	16	16	11	16	16		14	
15	Norway	11	11	14	15	10	10	1	6	5
16	Netherlands	6	5	7	4	6	7	4	2	10
17	North Macedonia	8	4	2	3	2	3	8	5	6
18	Azerbaijan	17	17	17	17	17	17		11	

Detailed voting results from Armenia (Final)
R/O	Country	Jury							Televote	
R/O	Country	Erik	R. Shahinyan	S. Rubenyan	A. Margaryan	T. Petrosyan	Rank	Points	Rank	Points
01	Malta	9	5	5	8	5	7	4	5	6
02	Albania	25	24	24	20	24	25		24	
03	Czech Republic	22	8	11	16	1	8	3	19	
04	Germany	17	12	17	14	18	17		22	
05	Russia	1	7	4	10	17	6	5	1	12
06	Denmark	21	11	16	21	20	19		14	
07	San Marino	12	16	23	22	23	22		23	
08	North Macedonia	7	1	3	2	4	2	10	11	
09	Sweden	2	2	2	1	2	1	12	9	2
10	Slovenia	23	14	9	7	10	11		12	
11	Cyprus	8	21	14	24	6	14		16	
12	Netherlands	4	4	6	3	12	5	6	2	10
13	Greece	18	22	18	25	25	24		15	
14	Israel	10	13	10	17	9	15		26	
15	Norway	24	6	21	12	8	12		6	5
16	United Kingdom	16	3	12	9	15	9	2	25	
17	Iceland	11	25	25	18	21	21		8	3
18	Estonia	15	20	20	19	22	23		17	
19	Belarus	6	9	13	15	16	10	1	20	
20	Azerbaijan	26	26	26	26	26	26		18	
21	France	14	18	8	6	19	13		7	4
22	Italy	5	17	1	4	7	3	8	4	7
23	Serbia	20	19	15	11	11	16		21	
24	Switzerland	3	10	7	5	3	4	7	3	8
25	Australia	19	15	22	13	14	18		10	1
26	Spain	13	23	19	23	13	20		13	
