= Azerbaijan in the Eurovision Song Contest 2019 =

- Eurovision Song Contest 2019
- Country: Azerbaijan
- Selection process: Internal selection
- Announcement date: 8 March 2019

Competing entry
- Song: "Truth"
- Artist: Chingiz
- Songwriters: Borislav Milanov; Trey Campbell; Joacim Persson; Pablo Dinero; Hostess; Chingiz Mustafayev

Placement
- Semi-final result: Qualified (5th, 224 points)
- Final result: 8th, 302 points

Participation chronology

Azerbaijan was represented at the Eurovision Song Contest 2019 with the song "Truth" written by Borislav Milanov, Trey Campbell, Joacim Persson, Pablo Dinero and Hostess. The song was performed by Chingiz, who was internally selected by the Azerbaijani broadcaster İctimai Television (İTV) in March 2019 to represent the nation at the 2019 contest in Tel Aviv, Israel. Songwriter Trey Campbell represented Bulgaria in the Eurovision Song Contest 2018 as part of the group Equinox with the song "Bones" where they placed fourteenth in the grand final of the competition. The song "Truth" was presented to the public on 8 March 2019.

Azerbaijan was drawn to compete in the second semi-final of the Eurovision Song Contest which took place on 16 May 2019. Performing as the closing entry during the show in position 18, "Truth" was announced among the top 10 entries of the second semi-final and therefore qualified to compete in the final on 18 May. It was later revealed that Azerbaijan placed fifth out of the 18 participating countries in the semi-final with 224 points. In the final, Azerbaijan performed in position 20 and placed eighth out of the 26 participating countries, scoring 302 points.

== Background ==
Prior to the 2019 contest, Azerbaijan had participated in the Eurovision Song Contest eleven times since its first entry in 2008. Azerbaijan had won the contest on one occasion in 2011 with the song "Running Scared" performed by Ell and Nikki. Since their debut in 2008, Azerbaijan has had a string of successful results, qualifying to the final in every contest until in 2018 when they failed to qualify with the song "X My Heart" performed by Aisel. Azerbaijan has placed in the top ten six times, all occurring consecutively between 2008 and 2013. This included a third-place result in 2009 with the song "Always" performed by AySel and Arash and a second-place result in 2013 with the song "Hold Me" performed by Farid Mammadov.

The Azerbaijani national broadcaster, İctimai Television (İTV), broadcasts the event within Azerbaijan and organises the selection process for the nation's entry. İTV confirmed their intentions to participate at the 2019 Eurovision Song Contest on 4 September 2018. Azerbaijan had used various methods to select the Azerbaijani entry in the past, including internal selections of both the artist and song, as well as national finals to select their artist followed by an internal selection to determine the song. Between 2011 and 2013, Azerbaijan organized a national final titled Milli Seçim Turu to select the performer, song or both for Eurovision. In 2014, the broadcaster utilised an existing talent show format titled Böyük Səhnə where the winning performer would subsequently be given an internally selected song. Since 2015, the broadcaster internally selected both the artist and song that represented Azerbaijan, a procedure which continued for the selection of their 2019 entry.

== Before Eurovision ==
=== Internal selection ===
Both the artist and song that represented Azerbaijan at the Eurovision Song Contest 2019 was selected internally by İTV. On 24 January 2019, the broadcaster called for interested songwriters to submit their entries by 7 February 2019. Songwriters could be of any nationality. On 7 February 2019, Head of Delegation Husniya Maharramova revealed that four potential performers had been shortlisted from over 40 artists that attended a casting round in late 2018: Chingiz Mustafayev, Leman Dadashova, Samira Efendi and Tofig Hajiyev.

On 8 March 2019, İTV announced that Chingiz Mustafayev would represent Azerbaijan, performing the song "Truth". The selection of Chingiz as the Azerbaijani Eurovision contestant was based on the decision of İTV and a national jury panel, while "Truth" was selected from over 350 submissions from local and international songwriters in a similar method. "Truth" was written by Chingiz himself together with members of the songwriting team Symphonix International: Borislav Milanov, Trey Campbell, Joacim Persson, Pablo Dinero and Hostess, and was presented on the same day via the release of the official music video. Trey Campbell previously represented Bulgaria in the 2018 contest, where he performed the song "Bones" as a member of the group Equinox and placed fourteenth. In regards to the song, songwriter Borislav Milanov stated: "Initially, I was a little nervous about how Chingiz would perform the song, since he comes from a different musical background. But meeting him totally changed my mind. He's so passionate about music and his own culture. We even added some unique elements of traditional Azerbaijani music, which worked brilliantly to make the song an authentic fusion of Azerbaijan and the West."

== At Eurovision ==
According to Eurovision rules, all nations with the exceptions of the host country and the "Big Five" (France, Germany, Italy, Spain and the United Kingdom) are required to qualify from one of two semi-finals in order to compete for the final; the top ten countries from each semi-final progress to the final. The European Broadcasting Union (EBU) split up the competing countries into six different pots based on voting patterns from previous contests, with countries with favourable voting histories put into the same pot. On 28 January 2019, a special allocation draw was held which placed each country into one of the two semi-finals, as well as which half of the show they would perform in. Azerbaijan was placed into the second semi-final, to be held on 16 May 2019, and was scheduled to perform in the second half of the show.

Once all the competing songs for the 2019 contest had been released, the running order for the semi-finals was decided by the shows' producers rather than through another draw, so that similar songs were not placed next to each other. Azerbaijan was set to perform last in position 18, following the entry from North Macedonia.

The two semi-finals and final were broadcast in Azerbaijan on İTV with commentary by Murad Arif. The Azerbaijani spokesperson, who announced the top 12-point score awarded by the Azerbaijani jury during the final, was Faig Aghayev.

=== Semi-final ===
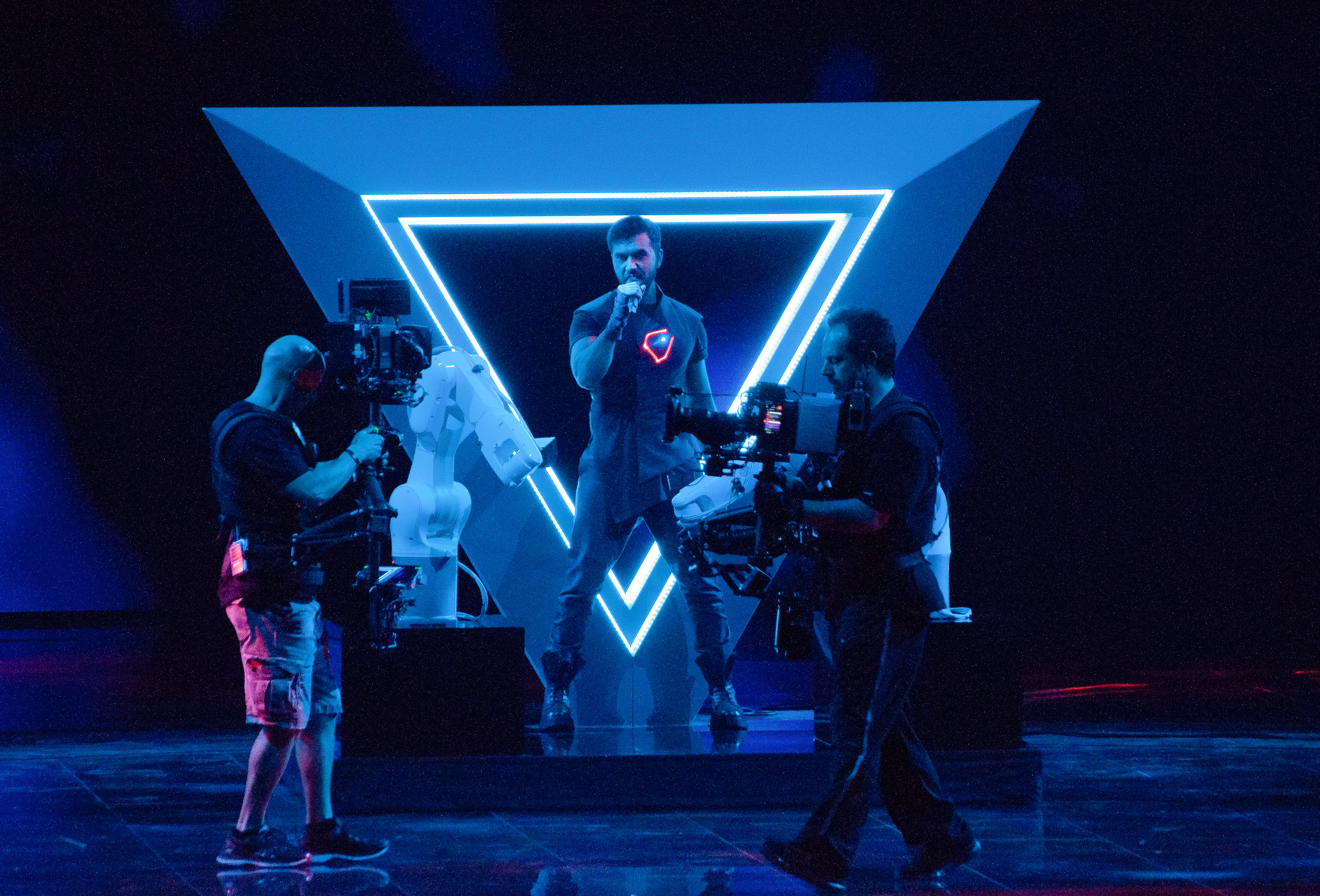
Chingiz during a rehearsal before the second semi-final

Chingiz took part in technical rehearsals on 7 and 11 May, followed by dress rehearsals on 15 and 16 May. This included the jury show on 15 May where the professional juries of each country watched and voted on the competing entries.

The Azerbaijani performance featured Chingiz dressed in black performing alone on stage. The performance began with Chingiz in front of a LED prop while two robot arms pointed a laser heart towards him. The LED screens displayed a large image of a woman in blue and a yellow beating heart and the performance also displayed a CGI version of Chingiz being shot up into the air before landing back on the ground. In regards to the performance, which was directed by Mads Enggaard, Chingiz stated: "The idea is that my heart is broken and I need to replace it with a bionic one. Some robot helps me literally get rid of it and forget about my ex. I realize that only accepting the truth and leaving my toxic love behind can heal me." Four off-stage backing vocalists were also part of the performance: Cedrik Hammar, Patrik Jean, Peter Simpson, Sara Li and Shira Gavrielov.

At the end of the show, Azerbaijan was announced as having finished in the top 10 and subsequently qualifying for the grand final. It was later revealed that Azerbaijan placed fifth in the semi-final, receiving a total of 224 points: 121 points from the televoting and 103 points from the juries.

=== Final ===
Shortly after the first semi-final, a winner's press conference was held for the ten qualifying countries. As part of this press conference, the qualifying artists took part in a draw to determine which half of the grand final they would subsequently participate in. This draw was done in the order the countries were announced during the semi-final. Azerbaijan was drawn to compete in the second half. Following this draw, the shows' producers decided upon the running order of the final, as they had done for the semi-finals. Azerbaijan was subsequently placed to perform in position 20, following the entry from Belarus and before the entry from France.

Chingiz once again took part in dress rehearsals on 17 and 18 May before the final, including the jury final where the professional juries cast their final votes before the live show. Chingiz performed a repeat of his semi-final performance during the final on 18 May. Azerbaijan placed eighth in the final, scoring 302 points: 100 points from the televoting and 202 points from the juries.

=== Voting ===
Voting during the three shows involved each country awarding two sets of points from 1-8, 10 and 12: one from their professional jury and the other from televoting. Each nation's jury consisted of five music industry professionals who are citizens of the country they represent, with their names published before the contest to ensure transparency. This jury judged each entry based on: vocal capacity; the stage performance; the song's composition and originality; and the overall impression by the act. In addition, no member of a national jury was permitted to be related in any way to any of the competing acts in such a way that they cannot vote impartially and independently. The individual rankings of each jury member as well as the nation's televoting results will be released shortly after the grand final.

Below is a breakdown of points awarded to Azerbaijan and awarded by Azerbaijan in the second semi-final and grand final of the contest, and the breakdown of the jury voting and televoting conducted during the two shows:

==== Points awarded to Azerbaijan ====
Points awarded to Azerbaijan (Semi-final 2)
| Score | Televote | Jury |
|---|---|---|
| 12 points | Russia | |
| 10 points | Romania | Albania; Latvia |
| 8 points | Moldova; Sweden | Lithuania; North Macedonia |
| 7 points | Albania; Austria; Denmark; Lithuania; Netherlands; United Kingdom | Croatia; Malta; Romania; United Kingdom |
| 6 points | Latvia; Norway | Austria; Italy; Moldova; Norway |
| 5 points | Croatia; North Macedonia | Ireland |
| 4 points | Germany; Italy; Malta; Switzerland | Russia |
| 3 points | Ireland | Germany |
| 2 points | | |
| 1 point | | Denmark; Netherlands; Sweden |

Points awarded to Azerbaijan (Final)
| Score | Televote | Jury |
|---|---|---|
| 12 points | Russia | Russia |
| 10 points | Moldova | Georgia; Lithuania; Romania; Slovenia |
| 8 points | | Albania; Greece; Malta; Portugal |
| 7 points | Czech Republic; Georgia | Ireland; Israel; Italy; Spain; United Kingdom |
| 6 points | Belarus; Romania | Cyprus; France; Latvia; Moldova |
| 5 points | Denmark; Lithuania | Belarus; Czech Republic; Estonia; Hungary; Norway; Sweden |
| 4 points | Latvia; Netherlands; San Marino | Austria; Denmark; Iceland; North Macedonia; San Marino |
| 3 points | Albania; Israel; Montenegro; Norway; Sweden; United Kingdom | Serbia |
| 2 points | Hungary; Malta; Poland | Australia; Finland; Poland |
| 1 point | Australia; Austria; Estonia; Italy; North Macedonia; Spain | |

==== Points awarded by Azerbaijan ====
Points awarded by Azerbaijan (Semi-final 2)
| Score | Televote | Jury |
|---|---|---|
| 12 points | Russia | Russia |
| 10 points | Switzerland | North Macedonia |
| 8 points | Netherlands | Romania |
| 7 points | North Macedonia | Albania |
| 6 points | Malta | Malta |
| 5 points | Norway | Latvia |
| 4 points | Albania | Netherlands |
| 3 points | Sweden | Moldova |
| 2 points | Lithuania | Switzerland |
| 1 point | Croatia | Lithuania |

Points awarded by Azerbaijan (Final)
| Score | Televote | Jury |
|---|---|---|
| 12 points | Russia | Russia |
| 10 points | San Marino | Malta |
| 8 points | Switzerland | North Macedonia |
| 7 points | Netherlands | Albania |
| 6 points | Italy | Greece |
| 5 points | Belarus | Italy |
| 4 points | Malta | Slovenia |
| 3 points | North Macedonia | Cyprus |
| 2 points | Spain | Australia |
| 1 point | Norway | Belarus |

==== Detailed voting results ====
The following members comprised the Azerbaijani jury:

- Rashad Hashimov (jury chairperson) – composer
- Emir Useynov (Emus Nero) – choreographer
- Tunzale Agayeva – author, composer, singer
- Ulviyya Konul – film director
- Yalchin Jabbarov – producer

Detailed voting results from Azerbaijan (Semi-final 2)
| R/O | Country | Jury | | | | | | | Televote | |
| R/O | Country | Emus Nero | T. Agayeva | U. Konul | Y. Jabbarov | R. Hashimov | Rank | Points | Rank | Points |
|---|---|---|---|---|---|---|---|---|---|---|
| 01 | Armenia | 17 | 17 | 17 | 17 | 17 | 17 | | 17 | |
| 02 | Ireland | 15 | 13 | 13 | 10 | 15 | 16 | | 14 | |
| 03 | Moldova | 3 | 15 | 6 | 15 | 10 | 8 | 3 | 11 | |
| 04 | Switzerland | 9 | 6 | 8 | 8 | 9 | 9 | 2 | 2 | 10 |
| 05 | Latvia | 12 | 11 | 3 | 12 | 3 | 6 | 5 | 15 | |
| 06 | Romania | 5 | 3 | 15 | 4 | 4 | 3 | 8 | 12 | |
| 07 | Denmark | 14 | 12 | 12 | 9 | 14 | 14 | | 13 | |
| 08 | Sweden | 6 | 9 | 5 | 16 | 16 | 12 | | 8 | 3 |
| 09 | Austria | 10 | 4 | 9 | 13 | 11 | 11 | | 16 | |
| 10 | Croatia | 11 | 5 | 11 | 14 | 12 | 13 | | 10 | 1 |
| 11 | Malta | 7 | 2 | 14 | 6 | 5 | 5 | 6 | 5 | 6 |
| 12 | Lithuania | 16 | 14 | 16 | 2 | 7 | 10 | 1 | 9 | 2 |
| 13 | Russia | 1 | 1 | 1 | 1 | 1 | 1 | 12 | 1 | 12 |
| 14 | Albania | 4 | 8 | 4 | 5 | 8 | 4 | 7 | 7 | 4 |
| 15 | Norway | 13 | 16 | 10 | 11 | 13 | 15 | | 6 | 5 |
| 16 | Netherlands | 8 | 10 | 7 | 7 | 6 | 7 | 4 | 3 | 8 |
| 17 | North Macedonia | 2 | 7 | 2 | 3 | 2 | 2 | 10 | 4 | 7 |
| 18 | Azerbaijan | | | | | | | | | |

Detailed voting results from Azerbaijan (Final)
| R/O | Country | Jury | | | | | | | Televote | |
| R/O | Country | Emus Nero | T. Agayeva | U. Konul | Y. Jabbarov | R. Hashimov | Rank | Points | Rank | Points |
|---|---|---|---|---|---|---|---|---|---|---|
| 01 | Malta | 6 | 2 | 9 | 4 | 6 | 2 | 10 | 7 | 4 |
| 02 | Albania | 4 | 9 | 5 | 6 | 9 | 4 | 7 | 16 | |
| 03 | Czech Republic | 19 | 21 | 22 | 2 | 17 | 14 | | 18 | |
| 04 | Germany | 25 | 23 | 21 | 18 | 16 | 22 | | 23 | |
| 05 | Russia | 1 | 1 | 1 | 1 | 1 | 1 | 12 | 1 | 12 |
| 06 | Denmark | 14 | 18 | 16 | 17 | 20 | 19 | | 19 | |
| 07 | San Marino | 7 | 17 | 10 | 13 | 7 | 13 | | 2 | 10 |
| 08 | North Macedonia | 5 | 11 | 4 | 5 | 5 | 3 | 8 | 8 | 3 |
| 09 | Sweden | 13 | 10 | 6 | 19 | 18 | 15 | | 20 | |
| 10 | Slovenia | 2 | 22 | 2 | 25 | 15 | 7 | 4 | 13 | |
| 11 | Cyprus | 10 | 12 | 7 | 10 | 3 | 8 | 3 | 17 | |
| 12 | Netherlands | 11 | 14 | 13 | 11 | 10 | 16 | | 4 | 7 |
| 13 | Greece | 12 | 3 | 14 | 3 | 8 | 5 | 6 | 25 | |
| 14 | Israel | 23 | 15 | 25 | 16 | 21 | 21 | | 15 | |
| 15 | Norway | 16 | 16 | 15 | 14 | 19 | 18 | | 10 | 1 |
| 16 | United Kingdom | 22 | 25 | 20 | 21 | 24 | 25 | | 24 | |
| 17 | Iceland | 3 | 5 | 24 | 24 | 14 | 11 | | 12 | |
| 18 | Estonia | 17 | 24 | 18 | 20 | 23 | 23 | | 21 | |
| 19 | Belarus | 15 | 13 | 8 | 7 | 4 | 10 | 1 | 6 | 5 |
| 20 | Azerbaijan | | | | | | | | | |
| 21 | France | 24 | 19 | 17 | 22 | 25 | 24 | | 14 | |
| 22 | Italy | 8 | 7 | 11 | 9 | 2 | 6 | 5 | 5 | 6 |
| 23 | Serbia | 18 | 20 | 23 | 15 | 13 | 20 | | 22 | |
| 24 | Switzerland | 9 | 6 | 12 | 12 | 11 | 12 | | 3 | 8 |
| 25 | Australia | 20 | 4 | 3 | 23 | 12 | 9 | 2 | 11 | |
| 26 | Spain | 21 | 8 | 19 | 8 | 22 | 17 | | 9 | 2 |
