= Netherlands in the Eurovision Song Contest 2019 =

- Eurovision Song Contest 2019
- Participating broadcaster: AVROTROS
- Country: Netherlands
- Selection process: Internal selection
- Announcement date: Artist: 21 January 2019; Song: 7 March 2019

Competing entry
- Song: "Arcade"
- Artist: Duncan Laurence
- Songwriters: Duncan Laurence; Joel Sjöö; Wouter Hardy; Will Knox

Placement
- Semi-final result: Qualified (1st, 280 points)
- Final result: 1st, 498 points

Participation chronology

The Netherlands was represented at the Eurovision Song Contest 2019 with the song "Arcade", written by Duncan Laurence, Joel Sjöö, Wouter Hardy, and Will Knox, and performed by Laurence himself. The Dutch participating broadcaster, AVROTROS, internally selected its entry for the contest. Laurence's appointment as the Dutch representative was announced on 21 January 2019, while the song, "Arcade", was presented to the public on 7 March 2019.

The Netherlands was drawn to compete in the second semi-final of the Eurovision Song Contest which took place on 16 May 2019. Performing during the show in position 16, "Arcade" was announced among the top 10 entries of the second semi-final and therefore qualified to compete in the final on 18 May. It was later revealed that the Netherlands placed first out of the 18 participating countries in the semi-final with 280 points. In the final, the Netherlands placed first out of the 26 participating countries, winning the contest with 498 points. This was the Netherlands' fifth win in the Eurovision Song Contest, having last won in 1975.

Following the victory, AVROTROS, along with sister broadcaster Nederlandse Omroep Stichting (NOS) and their parent public broadcasting organisation Nederlandse Publieke Omroep (NPO), was expected to host the Eurovision Song Contest 2020 in Rotterdam. However, the 2020 contest was cancelled due to the COVID-19 pandemic, and Rotterdam was later retained as the host city of the 2021 edition.

== Background ==
Prior to the 2019 contest, AVROTROS and its predecessor national broadcasters had participated in the Eurovision Song Contest representing the Netherlands fifty-nine times since NTS's debut in the inaugural contest in 1956. Since then, they had won the contest four times: in 1957 with the song "Net als toen" performed by Corry Brokken; in 1959 with the song "'n Beetje" performed by Teddy Scholten; in 1969 as one of four countries to tie for first place with "De troubadour" performed by Lenny Kuhr; and in 1975 with "Ding-a-dong" performed by the group Teach-In. Following the introduction of semi-finals for the 2004 contest, the Netherlands had featured in six finals. In 2018, "Outlaw in 'Em" by Waylon placed 18th in the final.

As part of its duties as participating broadcaster, AVROTROS organises the selection of its entry in the Eurovision Song Contest and broadcasts the event in the country. The Dutch broadcaster had used various methods to select its entry in the past, such as the Nationaal Songfestival, a live televised national final to choose the performer, song, or both to compete at Eurovision. However, internal selections have also been held on occasion. Since 2013, the broadcaster has internally selected its entry for the contest. In 2013, the internal selection of "Birds" by Anouk managed to take the country to the final for the first time in eight years and placed ninth overall. In 2014, the internal selection of "Calm After the Storm" by the Common Linnets qualified to the final once again and placed second, making it the most successful Dutch result in the contest since its victory in 1975. For 2019, the broadcaster opted to continue selecting its entry through an internal selection.

== Before Eurovision ==
=== Internal selection ===
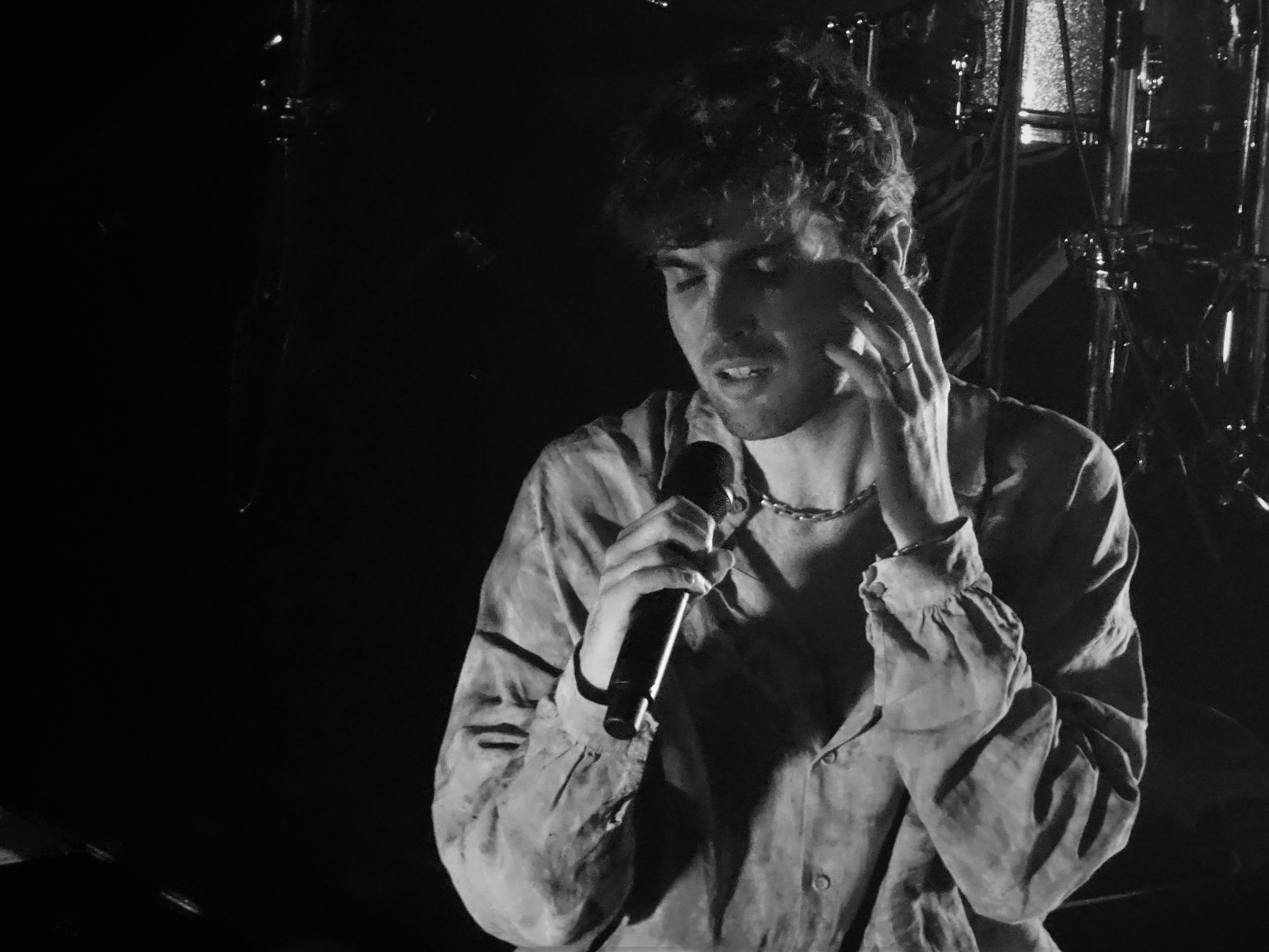
Duncan Laurence (pictured in 2021) was internally selected to represent the Netherlands in the Eurovision Song Contest 2019.

AVROTROS revealed on 23 October 2018 during the Dutch talk show Tijd voor MAX that it would continue to internally select both the artist and song for the Eurovision Song Contest, and that several artists had already been in contact with them in regards to participating. Artists that were rumoured in Dutch media to be in talks with the broadcaster included singer Caro Emerald and the winner of the sixth series of the reality singing competition The Voice of Holland Maan, while polls conducted by Dutch entertainment portal RTL Boulevard and Eurovision website songfestivalweblog.nl were both won by the band Kensington and followed respectively by singers Samantha Steenwijk and Sharon den Adel.

On 21 January 2019, AVROTROS announced that it had selected singer Duncan Laurence to represent the Netherlands at the 2019 contest. The proposal of Laurence as the Dutch representative came from Ilse DeLange, who previously represented the Netherlands in 2014 as a member of the Common Linnets, while the selection occurred through the decision of a selection commission consisting of singer and television host Jan Smit, television host and author Cornald Maas, radio DJ Daniël Dekker and AVROTROS general director Eric van Stade.

On 7 March 2019, Laurence's Eurovision entry, "Arcade", was presented to the public through the release of the official music video, directed by Paul Bellaart, via the official Eurovision YouTube channel. The song was written by Laurence himself together with Joel Sjöö, Wouter Hardy and Will Knox. Following the release of "Arcade", the Netherlands was installed by bookmakers as the favourite to win the Eurovision Song Contest 2019.

When I was studying at the Rockacademie, I learned that you can appeal to a large audience without losing your own story in the process. I searched for touching stories that moves people, from my own life or someone else's. I got my inspiration from the story of a loved one who died at a young age. I decided to call the song "Arcade" - the words and chords came by themselves, which is why, despite the alternations in the song, it still sounds so organic. During the writing process of "Arcade", I received help from Joel Sjöö and Wouter Hardy, and because of that it developed into a shared story and not just my own. "Arcade" is a story about the search for the love of your life. It is the hope for the - sometimes - unattainable.

— Duncan Laurence about "Arcade"

=== Promotion ===
Duncan Laurence specifically promoted "Arcade" as the Dutch Eurovision entry on 14 April 2019 by performing during the London Eurovision Party, which was held at the Café de Paris venue in London and hosted by Nicki French and Paddy O'Connell. In addition to international appearances, promotional activities also occurred within the Netherlands where he performed at live events, radio shows and talk shows. On 14 April, Laurence performed during the Eurovision in Concert event which was held at the AFAS Live venue in Amsterdam and hosted by Edsilia Rombley and Marlayne, and on 1 May he performed at a sold-out solo concert which was held at the Zonnehuis in Amsterdam.

== At Eurovision ==
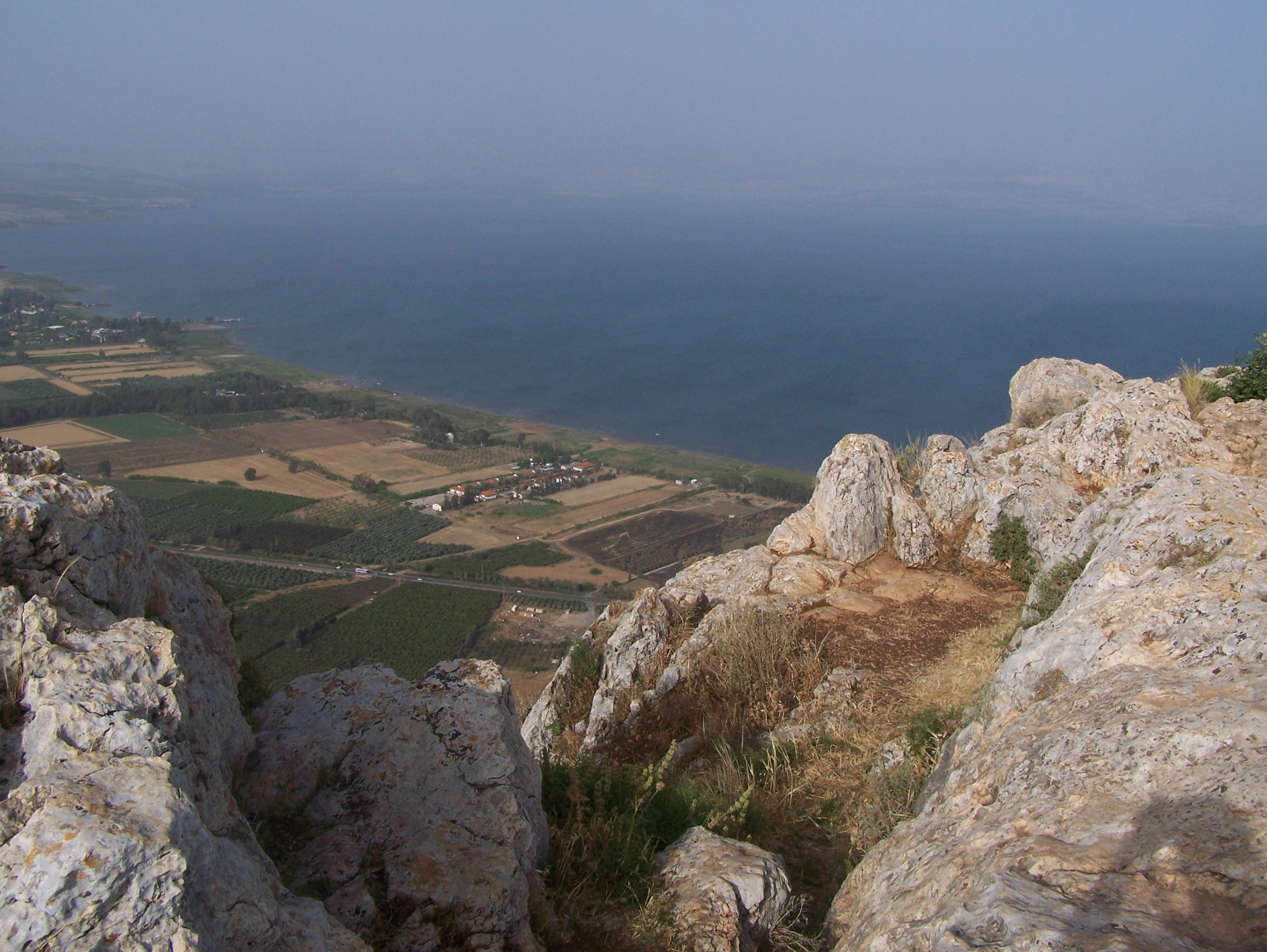
A video postcard introduced Duncan Laurence's performance in the second semi-final of the Eurovision Song Contest 2019. The postcard was filmed at the Mount Arbel and featured Duncan Laurence performing a themed dance.

According to Eurovision rules, all nations with the exceptions of the host country and the "Big Five" (France, Germany, Italy, Spain, and the United Kingdom) are required to qualify from one of two semi-finals in order to compete for the final; the top ten countries from each semi-final progress to the final. The European Broadcasting Union (EBU) split up the competing countries into six different pots based on voting patterns from previous contests, with countries with favourable voting histories put into the same pot. On 28 January 2019, a special allocation draw was held which placed each country into one of the two semi-finals, as well as which half of the show they would perform in. The Netherlands was placed into the second semi-final, to be held on 16 May 2019, and was scheduled to perform in the second half of the show.

Once all the competing songs for the 2019 contest had been released, the running order for the semi-finals was decided by the shows' producers rather than through another draw, so that similar songs were not placed next to each other. The Netherlands was set to perform in position 16, following the entry from Norway and before the entry from North Macedonia.

The two semi-finals and the final were broadcast on NPO 1 with commentary by Jan Smit and Cornald Maas as well as via radio on NPO Radio 2 with commentary by Wouter van der Goes and Frank van 't Hof. AVROTROS appointed Emma Wortelboer as its spokesperson to announced the top 12-point score awarded by the Dutch jury during the final.

=== Semi-final ===
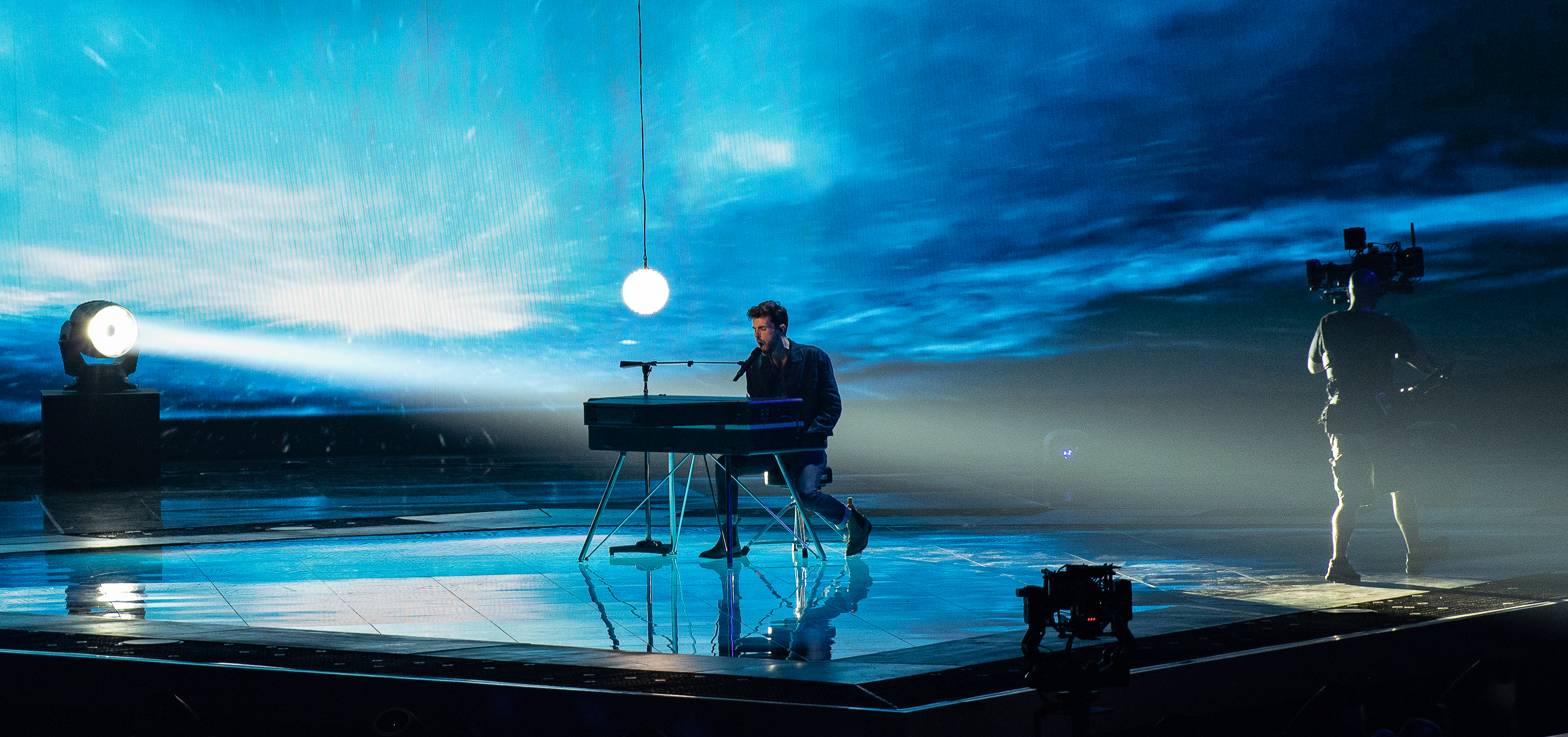
Duncan Laurence during a rehearsal before the second semi-final.

Duncan Laurence took part in technical rehearsals on 7 and 11 May, followed by dress rehearsals on 15 and 16 May. This included the jury show on 15 May where the professional juries of each country watched and voted on the competing entries.

The Dutch performance featured Laurence wearing a blue outfit consisting of a jacket, shirt and trousers, and playing an electric piano alone on stage with a single spotlight focused on the singer to re-create the emotions and feelings he had when he first wrote "Arcade". A white light sphere descended from the ceiling during the second chorus and bridge of the song to symbolize the hope Laurence lost and sought to find again. The LED screens displayed a smoky blue theme. Laurence was joined by three off-stage backing vocalists: Kris Rietveld, Marcel Swerissen and Sarina Voorn. The staging director for the performance was Hans Pannecoucke, who worked with the Dutch entrants between 2014 and 2016 as well as in 2018 in a similar role.

At the end of the show, the Netherlands was announced as having finished in the top 10 and subsequently qualifying for the grand final. It was later revealed that the Netherlands placed first in the semi-final, receiving a total of 280 points: 140 points from both the televoting and the juries.

=== Final ===
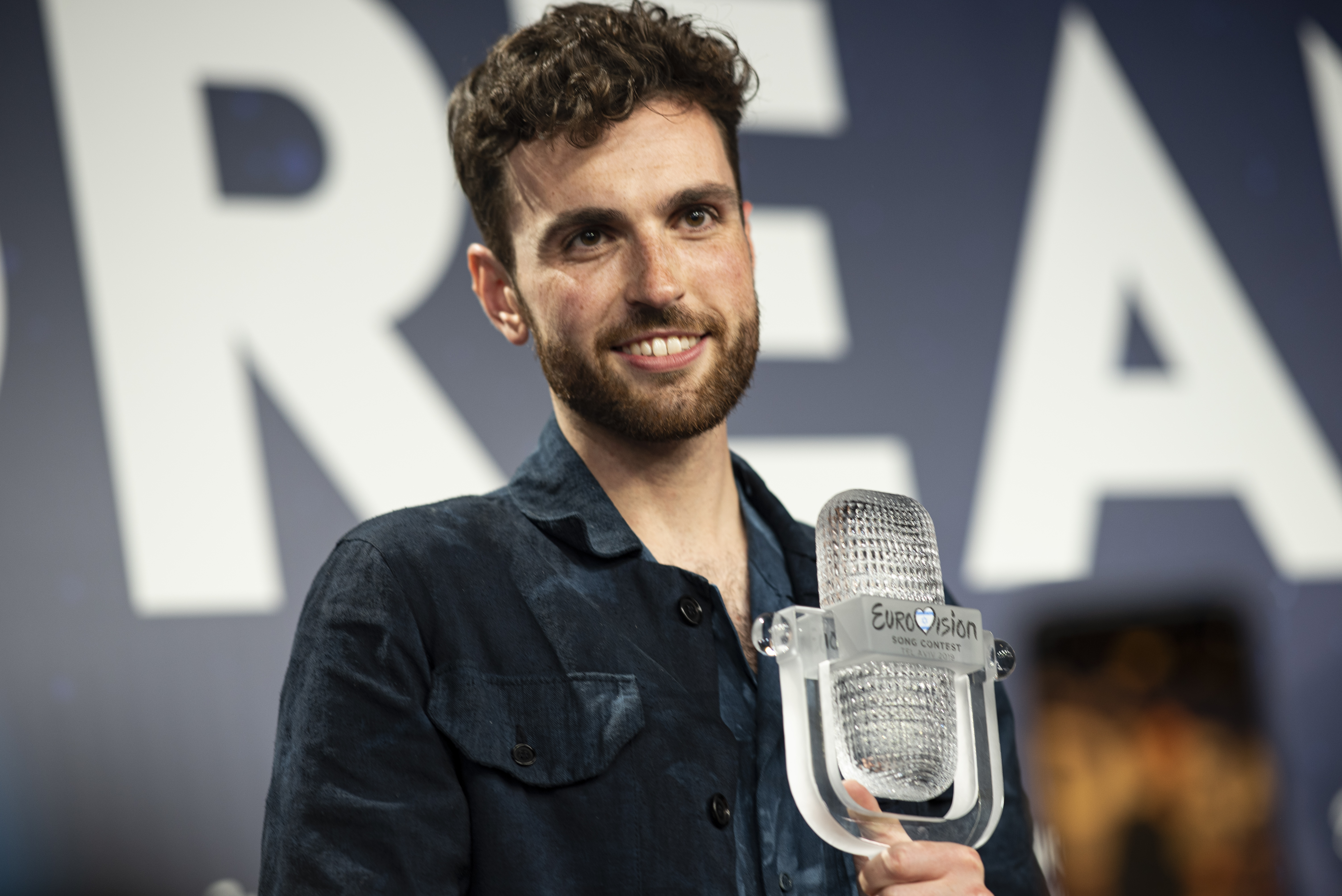
Duncan Laurence during the winner's press conference

Shortly after the first semi-final, a winner's press conference was held for the ten qualifying countries. As part of this press conference, the qualifying artists took part in a draw to determine which half of the grand final they would subsequently participate in. This draw was done in the order the countries were announced during the semi-final. The Netherlands was drawn to compete in the second half. Following this draw, the shows' producers decided upon the running order of the final, as they had done for the semi-finals. The Netherlands was subsequently placed to perform in position 12, following the entry from Cyprus and before the entry from Greece.

Duncan Laurence once again took part in dress rehearsals on 17 and 18 May before the final, including the jury final where the professional juries cast their final votes before the live show. Laurence performed a repeat of his semi-final performance during the final on 18 May. The Netherlands won the contest placing first with a score of 498 points: 261 points from the televoting and 237 points from the juries. This was the Netherlands's fifth victory in the Eurovision Song Contest; the country's most recent win was in 1975.

==== Marcel Bezençon Awards ====
The Marcel Bezençon Awards, first awarded during the 2002 contest, are awards honouring the best competing songs in the final each year. Named after the creator of the annual contest, Marcel Bezençon, the awards are divided into 3 categories: the Press Award, given to the best entry as voted on by the accredited media and press during the event; the Artistic Award, presented to the best artist as voted on by the shows' commentators; and the Composer Award, given to the best and most original composition as voted by the participating composers. Duncan Laurence was awarded the Press Award, which was accepted at the awards ceremony by Laurence.

=== Voting ===
Voting during the three shows involved each country awarding two sets of points from 1-8, 10 and 12: one from their professional jury and the other from televoting. Each nation's jury consisted of five music industry professionals who are citizens of the country they represent, with their names published before the contest to ensure transparency. This jury judged each entry based on: vocal capacity; the stage performance; the song's composition and originality; and the overall impression by the act. In addition, no member of a national jury was permitted to be related in any way to any of the competing acts in such a way that they cannot vote impartially and independently. The individual rankings of each jury member as well as the nation's televoting results will be released shortly after the grand final.

==== Points awarded to the Netherlands ====
Points awarded to the Netherlands (Semi-final 2)
Score	Televote	Jury
12 points		Lithuania; Malta; Switzerland
10 points	Albania; Armenia; Malta	Austria; Germany; Norway; Sweden
8 points	Azerbaijan; Denmark; Germany; Ireland; North Macedonia	Croatia; Ireland; Latvia; Romania
7 points	Croatia; Latvia; Moldova; Russia	Denmark
6 points	Austria; Lithuania; Romania; Switzerland	North Macedonia
5 points	Norway; Sweden; United Kingdom	
4 points		Albania; Armenia; Azerbaijan; Italy
3 points	Italy	
2 points		United Kingdom
1 point		Russia

Points awarded to the Netherlands (Final)
Score	Televote	Jury
12 points	Belgium; Romania	France; Israel; Latvia; Lithuania; Portugal; Sweden
10 points	Armenia; Belarus; Malta; Poland	Switzerland
8 points	Estonia; Hungary; Ireland; Norway; Portugal; Spain	Austria; Finland; Georgia; Germany; Ireland; Spain
7 points	Albania; Austria; Azerbaijan; Denmark; Germany; Lithuania; North Macedonia	Denmark; Estonia; Iceland; Malta; North Macedonia; Norway
6 points	Australia; Cyprus; Greece; Moldova; San Marino; Sweden; Switzerland	Armenia; Australia; Belarus; Belgium; Croatia; Czech Republic; Slovenia; United Kingdom
5 points	Finland; France; Georgia; Iceland; Italy; Latvia; Russia; Slovenia	Cyprus; Romania
4 points	Croatia; Czech Republic; United Kingdom	
3 points	Serbia	Moldova; San Marino
2 points	Israel	
1 point	Montenegro	Hungary

==== Points awarded by the Netherlands ====
Points awarded by the Netherlands (Semi-final 2)
Score	Televote	Jury
12 points	Norway	Sweden
10 points	Sweden	Malta
8 points	Switzerland	Switzerland
7 points	Azerbaijan	Russia
6 points	North Macedonia	Moldova
5 points	Armenia	Croatia
4 points	Denmark	North Macedonia
3 points	Russia	Denmark
2 points	Lithuania	Armenia
1 point	Malta	Azerbaijan

Points awarded by the Netherlands (Final)
Score	Televote	Jury
12 points	Norway	Sweden
10 points	Italy	Switzerland
8 points	Sweden	Malta
7 points	Iceland	Denmark
6 points	Switzerland	Italy
5 points	Denmark	Russia
4 points	Azerbaijan	Czech Republic
3 points	Spain	North Macedonia
2 points	Australia	Australia
1 point	North Macedonia	Cyprus

==== Detailed voting results ====
The following members comprised the Dutch jury:

- Elise van der Horst (EliZe; jury chairperson) – singer, songwriter
- Holger Schwedt – producer
- Ruud de Wild – radio DJ, host
- Henkjan Smits – host, talent scout, producer
- Sabrina Starke – singer, songwriter

Detailed voting results from the Netherlands (Semi-final 2)
R/O	Country	Jury							Televote	
R/O	Country	EliZe	H. Schwedt	R. de Wild	H. Smits	S. Starke	Rank	Points	Rank	Points
01	Armenia	8	8	7	15	5	9	2	6	5
02	Ireland	13	11	5	10	13	11		15	
03	Moldova	7	10	3	8	3	5	6	16	
04	Switzerland	2	6	4	4	14	3	8	3	8
05	Latvia	11	14	15	17	11	15		13	
06	Romania	9	12	14	13	15	14		14	
07	Denmark	10	9	2	5	10	8	3	7	4
08	Sweden	1	1	1	1	2	1	12	2	10
09	Austria	17	15	16	16	12	17		17	
10	Croatia	3	2	12	6	16	6	5	12	
11	Malta	4	4	10	2	1	2	10	10	1
12	Lithuania	14	13	8	7	9	12		9	2
13	Russia	5	3	13	3	8	4	7	8	3
14	Albania	16	17	9	14	17	16		11	
15	Norway	12	16	17	12	7	13		1	12
16	Netherlands									
17	North Macedonia	6	5	6	11	4	7	4	5	6
18	Azerbaijan	15	7	11	9	6	10	1	4	7

Detailed voting results from the Netherlands (Final)
R/O	Country	Jury							Televote	
R/O	Country	EliZe	H. Schwedt	R. de Wild	H. Smits	S. Starke	Rank	Points	Rank	Points
01	Malta	4	2	19	3	4	3	8	17	
02	Albania	19	18	22	22	25	23		20	
03	Czech Republic	5	16	9	6	6	7	4	13	
04	Germany	13	17	6	21	8	12		21	
05	Russia	3	4	11	7	11	6	5	11	
06	Denmark	8	5	1	4	10	4	7	6	5
07	San Marino	24	24	25	25	24	25		12	
08	North Macedonia	6	10	8	8	9	8	3	10	1
09	Sweden	1	3	2	2	1	1	12	3	8
10	Slovenia	20	22	24	24	18	24		15	
11	Cyprus	7	7	20	17	5	10	1	22	
12	Netherlands									
13	Greece	25	25	14	23	23	22		25	
14	Israel	21	23	15	20	22	21		18	
15	Norway	12	13	21	16	19	18		1	12
16	United Kingdom	16	15	12	14	12	16		23	
17	Iceland	17	19	23	15	21	20		4	7
18	Estonia	23	14	18	19	17	19		14	
19	Belarus	18	11	10	12	16	15		24	
20	Azerbaijan	14	8	17	11	13	14		7	4
21	France	15	12	16	13	7	13		16	
22	Italy	10	9	3	9	2	5	6	2	10
23	Serbia	11	20	5	10	14	11		19	
24	Switzerland	2	1	4	1	3	2	10	5	6
25	Australia	9	6	13	5	15	9	2	9	2
26	Spain	22	21	7	18	20	17		8	3
