= Malta in the Eurovision Song Contest 2019 =

- Eurovision Song Contest 2019
- Participating broadcaster: Public Broadcasting Services (PBS)
- Country: Malta
- Selection process: Artist: X Factor Malta; Song: Internal selection
- Selection date: Artist: 26 January 2019; Song: 10 March 2019

Competing entry
- Song: "Chameleon"
- Artist: Michela
- Songwriters: Joacim Persson; Paula Winger; Borislav Milanov; Johan Alkenäs

Placement
- Semi-final result: Qualified (8th, 157 points)
- Final result: 14th, 107 points

Participation chronology

Malta was represented at the Eurovision Song Contest 2019 with the song "Chameleon", written by Joacim Persson, Paula Winger, Borislav Milanov, and Johan Alkenäs, and performed by Michela. The Maltese participating broadcaster, Public Broadcasting Services (PBS), selected its artist for the contest through the first season of X Factor Malta. The competition concluded with a final on 26 January 2019 where Michela eventually emerged as the winner. The song she would perform at the contest, "Chameleon", was internally selected by PBS later and released to the public on 10 March.

Malta was drawn to compete in the second semi-final of the Eurovision Song Contest which took place on 16 May 2019. Performing during the show in position 11, "Chameleon" was announced among the top 10 entries of the first semi-final and therefore qualified to compete in the final on 18 May. It was later revealed that Malta placed eighth out of the 18 participating countries in the semi-final with 157 points. In the final, Malta performed as the opening entry in position 1 and placed 14th out of the 26 participating countries, scoring 107 points.

== Background ==
Prior to the 2019 contest, the Maltese Broadcasting Authority (MBA) until 1975, and the Public Broadcasting Services (PBS) since 1991, have participated in the Eurovision Song Contest representing Malta thirty-one times since MBA's first entry in 1971. MBA briefly competed in the contest in the 1970s before withdrawing for sixteen years, while PBS competed in every contest since their return in 1991. Their best placing in the contest thus far was second, achieved on two occasions: in 2002 with the song "7th Wonder" performed by Ira Losco and in the 2005 contest with the song "Angel" performed by Chiara. In the 2018 edition, "Taboo" performed by Christabelle failed to qualify to the final.

As part of its duties as participating broadcaster, PBS organises the selection of its entry in the Eurovision Song Contest and broadcasts the event in the country. The broadcaster confirmed its intentions to participate at the 2019 contest on 20 June 2018. PBS selected its entry consistently through a national final procedure with several artists to choose both the song and performer, however the broadcaster announced that it would utilise the newly created talent show format X Factor Malta for its 2019 participation, which would result in the selection of a winning performer that would subsequently be given an internally selected song to perform at Eurovision.

== Before Eurovision ==
=== X Factor Malta ===
The Maltese artist for the Eurovision Song Contest 2019 was selected through the first season of X Factor Malta, the Maltese version of the British television reality music competition The X Factor created by Simon Cowell. The first season premiered on 7 October 2018 and concluded with a final on 26 January 2019. In addition to selecting the Maltese Eurovision entrant, the winner also secured a record contract with Sony Music Italy. All shows in the competition were hosted by actor Ben Camille and broadcast on Television Malta (TVM) as well on the broadcaster's website tvm.com.mt.

==== Selection process ====
Singers were able to submit their applications starting from 26 June 2018 either via an online submission form, by WhatsApp messaging a video audition or by attending pop-up auditions held across Malta. Producers auditions took place between 13 and 15 July 2018 at Fort St. Elmo where the show's producers assessed the auditioning acts and determined those that would progress through the selection process. The chosen auditionees were invited back to the last set of auditions that took place in front of the judges between 1 and 8 August 2018 at Fort St. Angelo. The four judges were:

- Ira Losco – Singer-songwriter, represented Malta in 2002 and in 2016
- Howard Keith Debono – Music producer
- Ray Mercieca – Singer-songwriter and musician, lead singer of the band The Rifffs
- Alexandra Alden – Singer-songwriter

120 contestants were selected by the judges to progress to the bootcamp round, which they were split into the four category groups - Boys, Girls, Overs and Groups, and were given one song to sing a cappella. 30 acts were eliminated and the remaining 90 acts each selected a song from the Wall of Songs, which they had to perform with three others who had selected the same song. In the final challenge, the remaining acts, including newly formed groups, performed a song of their own choice and the judges selected 48 acts, 12 from each category, to go through to the Six Chair Challenge filmed at the Malta Fairs & Conventions Centre in Attard on 11 and 12 October 2018. 24 acts advanced to the Judges' Houses, broadcast on 23 and 30 December 2018, during which the four judges eliminated 3 acts from each category with a total of 12 acts advancing to the live shows.

==== Live shows ====
Key:

– Winner
– Runner-up
– Third Place

Category (mentor)	Acts		
Boys (Losco)	Norbert Bondin	Luke Chappell	Owen Leuellen
Girls (Debono)	Kelsey Bellante	Nicole Frendo	Michela Pace
Over 25s (Mercieca)	Franklin Calleja	Petra	Ben Purplle
Groups (Alden)	4th Line	Kayati	Xtreme

=== Song selection ===
On 10 March 2019, PBS announced that Michela would perform the song "Chameleon" at the Eurovision Song Contest 2019 through the decision of multiple focus groups and music industry experts from 300 song submissions that were received by the broadcaster. "Chameleon" was written by members of the songwriting team Symphonix International: Joacim Persson, Paula Winger, Borislav Milanov and Johan Alkanäs. The release of the song and official music video was made available online on the broadcaster's website tvm.com.mt and the official Eurovision Song Contest's YouTube channel.

== At Eurovision ==
According to Eurovision rules, all nations with the exceptions of the host country and the "Big Five" (France, Germany, Italy, Spain and the United Kingdom) are required to qualify from one of two semi-finals in order to compete for the final; the top ten countries from each semi-final progress to the final. The European Broadcasting Union (EBU) split up the competing countries into six different pots based on voting patterns from previous contests, with countries with favourable voting histories put into the same pot. On 28 January 2019, an allocation draw was held which placed each country into one of the two semi-finals, as well as which half of the show they would perform in. Malta was placed into the second semi-final, to be held on 16 May 2019, and was scheduled to perform in the second half of the show.

Once all the competing songs for the 2019 contest had been released, the running order for the semi-finals was decided by the shows' producers rather than through another draw, so that similar songs were not placed next to each other. Malta was set to perform in position 11, following the entry from Croatia and before the entry from Lithuania.

The two semi-finals and the final were broadcast in Malta on TVM. The Maltese spokesperson, who announced the top 12 points awarded by the Maltese jury during the final, was Ben Camille.

=== Semi-final ===
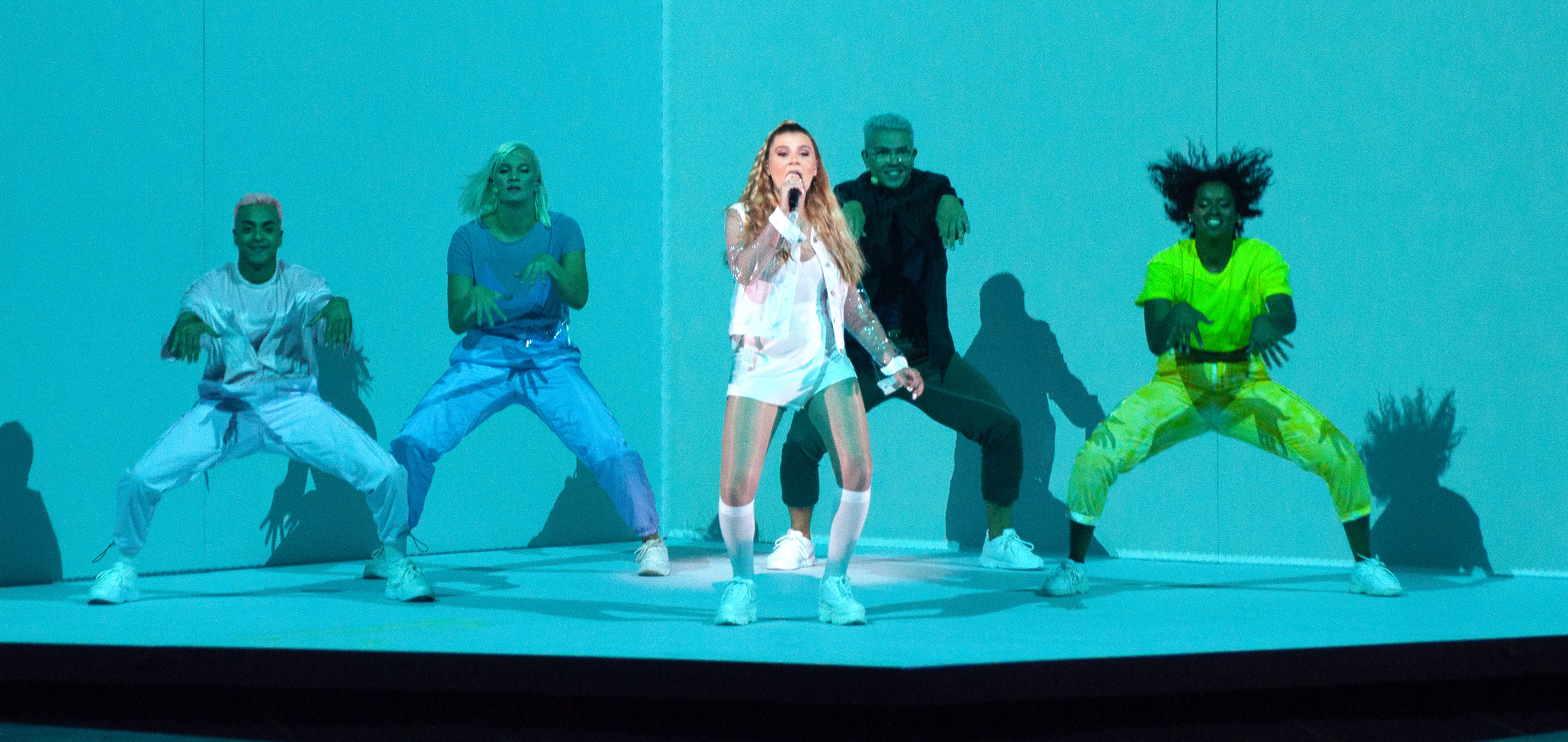
Michela during a rehearsal before the second semi-final

Michela took part in technical rehearsals on 7 and 11 May, followed by dress rehearsals on 15 and 16 May. This included the jury show on 15 May where the professional juries of each country watched and voted on the competing entries.

The Maltese performance featured Michela wearing white casual clothing and performing together with four dancers in LED panels that displayed various projections including an underwater world, a tropical jungle backdrop and a city skyline. The performance began with Michela performing a choreographed dance routine in a window before being joined by the dancers. The creative director for the Maltese performance was Ambra Succi. The four dancers featured during the performance were Albin Lindén, Amanda Arin, Amir Ashoor and Nyat K. Fredriksson. Michela was also joined by an off-stage backing vocalist: Destiny Chukunyere who was the winner of the Junior Eurovision Song Contest 2015.

At the end of the show, Malta was announced as having finished in the top 10 and consequently qualifying for the grand final. It was later revealed that Malta placed eighth in the semi-final, receiving a total of 157 points: 50 points from the televoting and 107 points from the juries.

=== Final ===
Shortly after the second semi-final, a winner's press conference was held for the ten qualifying countries. As part of this press conference, the qualifying artists took part in a draw to determine which half of the grand final they would subsequently participate in. This draw was done in the order the countries were announced during the semi-final. Malta was drawn to compete in the first half. Following this draw, the shows' producers decided upon the running order of the final, as they had done for the semi-finals. Malta was subsequently placed to perform in position 1, before the entry from Albania.

Michela once again took part in dress rehearsals on 17 and 18 May before the final, including the jury final where the professional juries cast their final votes before the live show. Michela performed a repeat of her semi-final performance during the final on 18 May. Malta placed fourteenth in the final, scoring 107 points: 20 points from the televoting and 87 points from the juries.

=== Voting ===
Voting during the three shows involved each country awarding two sets of points from 1–8, 10 and 12: one from their professional jury and the other from televoting. Each nation's jury consisted of five music industry professionals who are citizens of the country they represent, with their names published before the contest to ensure transparency. This jury judged each entry based on: vocal capacity; the stage performance; the song's composition and originality; and the overall impression by the act. In addition, no member of a national jury was permitted to be related in any way to any of the competing acts in such a way that they cannot vote impartially and independently. The individual rankings of each jury member as well as the nation's televoting results will be released shortly after the grand final.

Below is a breakdown of points awarded to Malta and awarded by Malta in the second semi-final and grand final of the contest, and the breakdown of the jury voting and televoting conducted during the two shows:

==== Points awarded to Malta ====
Points awarded to Malta (Semi-final 2)
Score	Televote	Jury
12 points		
10 points		Armenia; Italy; Netherlands
8 points	United Kingdom	Russia
7 points	Armenia	Moldova; North Macedonia
6 points	Azerbaijan	Albania; Azerbaijan; Croatia; Germany
5 points	Denmark	Romania
4 points	Ireland; North Macedonia	Ireland; Latvia; Norway; Sweden; Switzerland
3 points	Moldova; Norway	Lithuania
2 points	Croatia; Italy; Latvia; Romania	Austria
1 point	Lithuania; Netherlands	United Kingdom

Points awarded to Malta (Final)
Score	Televote	Jury
12 points		Belarus
10 points		Azerbaijan
8 points		Italy; Netherlands
7 points		
6 points	Armenia; North Macedonia	Montenegro; Russia
5 points		Greece; North Macedonia
4 points	Australia; Azerbaijan	Armenia; Israel; Poland
3 points		Cyprus; Czech Republic; Germany
2 points		Sweden
1 point		Finland; Latvia; Moldova; Slovenia

==== Points awarded by Malta ====
Points awarded by Malta (Semi-final 2)
Score	Televote	Jury
12 points	Switzerland	Netherlands
10 points	Netherlands	Sweden
8 points	Norway	Russia
7 points	Sweden	Azerbaijan
6 points	North Macedonia	Armenia
5 points	Russia	Moldova
4 points	Azerbaijan	Norway
3 points	Lithuania	Lithuania
2 points	Denmark	North Macedonia
1 point	Croatia	Romania

Points awarded by Malta (Final)
Score	Televote	Jury
12 points	Italy	Italy
10 points	Netherlands	Russia
8 points	Switzerland	Azerbaijan
7 points	Norway	Netherlands
6 points	Sweden	Cyprus
5 points	North Macedonia	Sweden
4 points	Russia	Greece
3 points	Australia	North Macedonia
2 points	Azerbaijan	Albania
1 point	Iceland	San Marino

==== Detailed voting results ====
The following members comprised the Maltese jury:

- Carlo Borg Bonaci (jury chairperson) – broadcaster
- Arthur Caruana – channel manager
- Nicole Frendo – student, singer
- Matthew James Borg – singer, songwriter, producer
- Eileen Ann Spiteri – logistics executive producer

Detailed voting results from Malta (Semi-final 2)
R/O	Country	Jury							Televote	
R/O	Country	C.B. Bonaci	A. Caruana	N. Frendo	M.J. Borg	E.A. Spiteri	Rank	Points	Rank	Points
01	Armenia	2	7	6	6	2	5	6	16	
02	Ireland	9	13	14	14	13	14		11	
03	Moldova	6	8	4	7	7	6	5	14	
04	Switzerland	7	9	17	15	8	12		1	12
05	Latvia	16	15	13	10	14	16		15	
06	Romania	12	11	7	5	15	10	1	12	
07	Denmark	17	12	12	13	10	15		9	2
08	Sweden	4	3	2	2	4	2	10	4	7
09	Austria	14	17	16	17	16	17		17	
10	Croatia	13	16	8	9	5	11		10	1
11	Malta									
12	Lithuania	11	1	15	16	17	8	3	8	3
13	Russia	3	4	3	4	3	3	8	6	5
14	Albania	15	14	10	11	9	13		13	
15	Norway	8	2	11	12	12	7	4	3	8
16	Netherlands	1	6	1	1	6	1	12	2	10
17	North Macedonia	10	5	9	8	11	9	2	5	6
18	Azerbaijan	5	10	5	3	1	4	7	7	4

Detailed voting results from Malta (Final)
R/O	Country	Jury							Televote	
R/O	Country	C.B. Bonaci	A. Caruana	N. Frendo	M.J. Borg	E.A. Spiteri	Rank	Points	Rank	Points
01	Malta									
02	Albania	9	11	7	11	10	9	2	19	
03	Czech Republic	21	24	19	18	21	21		18	
04	Germany	20	21	20	19	20	20		20	
05	Russia	4	1	2	3	2	2	10	7	4
06	Denmark	16	15	14	17	16	15		12	
07	San Marino	11	9	12	10	9	10	1	21	
08	North Macedonia	8	8	11	8	4	8	3	6	5
09	Sweden	7	6	5	5	7	6	5	5	6
10	Slovenia	25	25	25	23	23	25		23	
11	Cyprus	6	3	4	7	5	5	6	17	
12	Netherlands	3	7	3	4	6	4	7	2	10
13	Greece	5	4	8	6	8	7	4	24	
14	Israel	23	23	24	25	24	24		22	
15	Norway	17	13	18	16	15	16		4	7
16	United Kingdom	18	17	21	15	19	18		14	
17	Iceland	19	18	17	21	18	19		10	1
18	Estonia	22	22	23	24	25	23		11	
19	Belarus	14	14	9	13	12	12		25	
20	Azerbaijan	2	5	6	2	1	3	8	9	2
21	France	12	12	13	14	13	13		13	
22	Italy	1	2	1	1	3	1	12	1	12
23	Serbia	24	19	22	22	22	22		16	
24	Switzerland	15	16	15	9	14	14		3	8
25	Australia	10	10	10	12	11	11		8	3
26	Spain	13	20	16	20	17	17		15	
