= Let Me Love You (Tamara Todevska, Vrčak and Adrian Gaxha song) =

2008 song performed by Tamara Todevska

"Vo ime na ljubovta" "Let Me Love You"

Single by Tamara Todevska, Vrčak and Adrian Gaxha

from the album Na sedmo nebo
- Released: 23 February 2008
- Recorded: 2007
- Genre: Pop; R&B
- Length: 2:45
- Songwriter: Rade Vrčakovski
- Producers: Rade Vrčakovski; Valentino Skenderovski; Robert Bilbilov

Tamara Todevska singles chronology
"Smešno Zar Ne" (2007)	"Vo ime na ljubovta" "Let Me Love You" (2008)	"Dajem Ti Sve" (2008)

Vrčak singles chronology
"Nedopirliva" (2007)	"Vo ime na ljubovta" (2008)	"Toksična" (2008)

Adrian Gaxha singles chronology
"Nedopirliva" (2007)	"Vo ime na ljubovta" (2008)	"Toksična" (2008)

Eurovision Song Contest 2008 entry
- Country: Republic of Macedonia
- Artists: Tamara Todevska; Rade Vrčakovski; Adrian Gaxha
- As: Tamara, Vrčak & Adrian
- Language: English
- Composer: Rade Vrčakovski
- Lyricist: Rade Vrčakovski

Finals performance
- Semi-final result: 10th
- Semi-final points: 64

Entry chronology
- ◄ "Mojot svet" (2007)
- "Nešto što kje ostane" (2009) ►

Official performance video
- "Let Me Love You" on YouTube

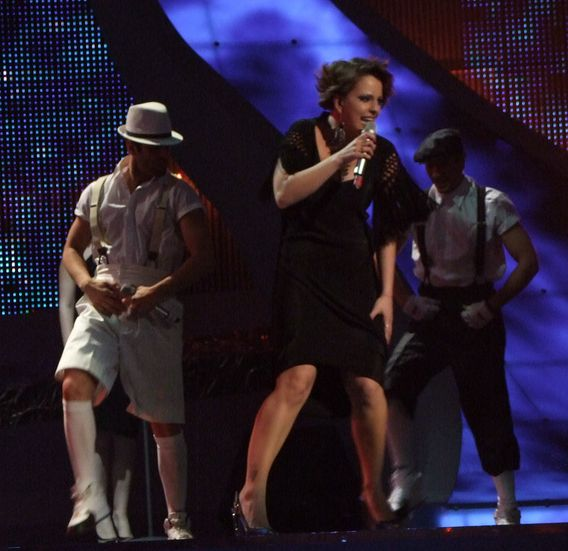
Todevska, Vrčak & Gaxha performing "Let Me Love You" at the Eurovision Song Contest

"Vo ime na ljubovta" (Macedonian: Во име на љубовта; "In the name of love") is a song by Tamara Todevska, Vrčak and Adrian Gaxha, who competed with it at Skopje Fest 2008. The song won, having been awarded the most televotes by the general public and the 7-member expert jury, and an English-language version ("Let Me Love You") represented Macedonia at the Eurovision Song Contest 2008 in Belgrade, Serbia, on 22 May 2008.

It was performed at number eighteen in the semi-final (a position the performers selected), following "Femme Fatale" by Evdokia Kadi for Cyprus and preceding "Senhora do mar (Negras águas)" by Vânia Fernandes for Portugal, but did not acquire enough points to proceed to the final stage of the competition. It was voted the 10th qualifier by the televote, however the juries chose Sweden to pass.

The song was also released in Russian (titled "Во Имя Любви", Vo Imya Lyubvi), Serbian (titled "Тебе волим" / "Tebe volim"), Turkish (titled "Yoksun") and Albanian (titled "Dashuri mistike"). All versions of the song have alternate music videos. At the Contest, the three of them performed the song with choreographed dancing being displayed behind them. The choreography was arranged by Adrian, who was assisted by a famous German choreographer.

== Background ==
The song was composed and written by Vrčak, who has had previous Eurovision Song Contest experience, having written the lyrics of the Macedonian entry in the Eurovision Song Contest 2006, "Ninanajna". Tamara, too, has previous Eurovision experience, having contributed backing vocals to the Toše Proeski song, "Life", at the Eurovision Song Contest 2004. She also placed second at the 2007 Skopje Fest with the song, "Kaži koj si ti", losing to Karolina Gočeva, who went on to represent Republic of North Macedonia at the Eurovision Song Contest 2007. Adrian Gaxha was a runner-up in the 2006 Macedonian Eurovision qualifier, having performed the song "Ljubov E" with Esma Redžepova. Vrčak, Tamara and Adrian have also taken some promotional photos of their Macedonian entry for the Eurovision Song Contest.

== Lyrics ==
"Vo ime na ljubovta" is an R&B-style song with several hip hop verses. Tamara sings about the person she loves, explaining that "without you every second is killing me slowly". She sings that "I don't know where you are [and] I'm waiting for you to come and save me". The song did not sound as it was supposed to in the Skopje Fest 2008 final as the sound of the backing track was not heard in the hall, as well in the TV broadcast. Apparently, the organisers of Skopje Fest, along with MKTV, explained that there were some technical difficulties. Regardless, the song went on to win the contest.

== Music video ==
Six music videos have been released for each version of the song. Though quite similar, the music videos feature the artists singing in the respective language. Director of the videos was Dejan Milicevic. Location where the videos were filmed is the first private university in Republic of Macedonia FON in Skopje. There are daily and nightly scenes in the university's outdoor and indoor. The video features a lot of young people that are dancing around the artists. In one of the scenes Vrčak & Adrian are on motorbike with beautiful girls behind them. In the end of the video Tamara, Vrčak & Adrian are leaving the university dressed in student uniforms.

== Track listings ==
1. "Vo ime na ljubovta" (Macedonian version)
2. "Let Me Love You" (English version)
3. "Yoksun" (Turkish version)
4. "Tebe volim" (Serbian version)
5. "Vo Imya Lyubvi" (Russian version)
6. "Dashuri mistike" (Albanian version)
7. "Vo ime na ljubovta" (karaoke)
8. "Let Me Love You" (karaoke)
