= Slovenia in the Eurovision Song Contest 2019 =

- Eurovision Song Contest 2019
- Participating broadcaster: Radiotelevizija Slovenija (RTVSLO)
- Country: Slovenia
- Selection process: Evrovizijska Melodija 2019
- Selection date: 16 February 2019

Competing entry
- Song: "Sebi"
- Artist: Zala Kralj and Gašper Šantl
- Songwriters: Zala Kralj; Gašper Šantl

Placement
- Semi-final result: Qualified (6th, 167 points)
- Final result: 15th, 105 points

Participation chronology

Slovenia was represented at the Eurovision Song Contest 2019 with the song "Sebi", written and performed by Zala Kralj and Gašper Šantl. The Slovene participating broadcaster, Radiotelevizija Slovenija (RTVSLO), organised the national final Evrovizijska Melodija 2019 in order to select its entry for the contest. Ten entries competed in the national final where the winner was selected over two rounds of voting. In the first round, the top two entries were selected by a three-member jury panel. In the second round, "Sebi" performed by Zala Kralj and Gašper Šantl was selected as the winner entirely by a public televote.

Slovenia was drawn to compete in the first semi-final of the Eurovision Song Contest which took place on 14 May 2019. Performing during the show in position 5, "Sebi" was announced among the top 10 entries of the first semi-final and hence qualified to compete in the final. It was later revealed that Slovenia placed sixth out of the 17 participating countries in the semi-final with 167 points. In the final, Slovenia performed in position 10 and placed fifteenth out of the 26 participating countries with 105 points.

== Background ==
Prior to the 2019 contest, Radiotelevizija Slovenija (RTVSLO) had participated in the Eurovision Song Contest representing Slovenia twenty-four times since its first entry in 1993. Its highest placing in the contest, to this point, has been seventh place, achieved on two occasions: in 1995 with the song "Prisluhni mi" performed by Darja Švajger and in 2001 with the song "Energy" performed by Nuša Derenda. The country's only other top ten result was achieved in 1997 when Tanja Ribič performing "Zbudi se" placed tenth. Since the introduction of semi-finals to the format of the contest in 2004, Slovenia had thus far only managed to qualify to the final on five occasions. In 2018, "Hvala, ne!" performed by Lea Sirk qualified to the final and placed twenty-second.

As part of its duties as participating broadcaster, RTVSLO organises the selection of its entry in the Eurovision Song Contest and broadcasts the event in the country. The broadcaster confirmed its participation in the 2019 contest on 6 September 2018. The broadcaster has traditionally selected its entry through a national final entitled Evrovizijska Melodija (EMA), which has been produced with variable formats. To this point, the broadcaster has only foregone the use of this national final in 2013 when the entry was internally selected. For 2019, the broadcaster opted to organise Evrovizijska Melodija 2019 (EMA 2019) to select the entry.

== Before Eurovision ==
=== EMA 2019 ===
EMA 2019 was the 23rd edition of the Slovenian national final format Evrovizijska Melodija (EMA), used by RTV Slovenija to select Slovenia's entry for the Eurovision Song Contest 2018. The competition took place at the RTV Slovenija Studio 1 in Ljubljana, hosted by Ajda Smrekar and was broadcast on TV SLO 1, Radio Val 202, Radio Koper, Radio Maribor and online via the broadcaster's RTV 4D platform. An online backstage broadcast at RTV Slovenija's official website also occurred concurrently with the competition, which was hosted by Tanja Kocman and Rok Bohinc. The national final was watched by 223,900 viewers in Slovenia with a market share of 11%.

==== Format ====
Ten songs competed in a televised show where the winner was selected over two rounds of voting. In the first round, a three-member expert jury selected two finalists out of the ten competing songs to proceed to a superfinal. Each member of the expert jury assigned a score of 1 (lowest score) to 5 (highest score) to each song with the top two being determined by the songs that receive the highest overall scores when the jury votes are combined. Ties were broken by giving priority to the song(s) that achieved a higher number of top scores (5), which would be followed by each juror indicating their preferred song should a tie still have persisted. In the superfinal, public televoting exclusively determined the winner. In case of technical problems with the televote, the jury would have voted to determine the winner in a similar process as in the first round of the competition.

==== Competing entries ====
Artists and composers were able to submit their entries to the broadcaster between 9 November 2018 and 14 December 2018. 103 entries were received by the broadcaster during the submission period. An expert committee consisting of Lea Sirk (2018 Slovenian Eurovision entrant), Mojca Menart (Head of ZKP RTV Slovenija), Aleksander Radić (Head of the Slovenian delegation at the Eurovision Song Contest) and Žiga Klančar (music editor for Radio Val 202) selected ten artists and songs for the competition from the received submissions. The competing artists were announced on 27 December 2018. Among the competing artists was former Slovenian Junior Eurovision contestant Ula Ložar who represented Slovenia in 2014.

==== Final ====
EMA 2019 took place on 16 February 2019. In addition to the performances of the competing entries, Smaal Tokk, Inot and 2018 Slovenian Eurovision entrant Lea Sirk performed as guests. The winner was selected over two rounds of voting. In the first round, a three-member jury panel selected two entries to proceed to the second round. The jury consisted of Lea Sirk, Darja Švajger (1995 and 1999 Slovenian Eurovision entrant) and Vladimir Graić (composer of Serbia's winning Eurovision entry "Molitva" in 2007). In the second round, a public televote selected "Sebi" performed by Zala Kralj and Gašper Šantl as the winner.

Final – 16 February 2019
R/O	Artist	Song	Songwriter(s)	Place
1	Kim	"Rhythm Back to You"	Maraaya, Jimmy Jansson, Samuel Waermö, Art Hunter	8
2	Renata Mohorič	"Three Bridges"	Grigor Koprov, Stiko Per Larsson	9
3	René	"Ne poveš"	Jean Markič	10
4	Fed Horses	"Ti ne poznaš konjev"	Jure Mihevc, Urša Mihevc	3
5	Ula Ložar	"Fridays"	Maraaya, Anej Piletič, Charlie Mason	3
6	Lumberjack	"Lepote dna"	Drago Popovič, Jaka Novak, Robi Glač, Blaž Kuster, David Podgornik, Rok Ahačevčič	6
7	Okustični	"Metulji plešejo"	Mate Bro, Karin Zemljič	5
8	Inmate	"Atma"	Andrej Bezjak, Marko Duplišak, Jure Grudnik, Miha Oblišar	7
9	Zala Kralj and Gašper Šantl	"Sebi"	Zala Kralj, Gašper Šantl	1
10	Raiven	"Kaos"	Sara Briški Cirman, July Jones, Lazy Joe, Peter Khoo, Alba	1

Superfinal – 16 February 2019
R/O	Artist	Song	Televote	Place
1	Zala Kralj and Gašper Šantl	"Sebi"	4,666	1
2	Raiven	"Kaos"	1,735	2

=== Preparation ===
Following Zala Kralj and Gašper Šantl's win at EMA 2019, the music video of "Sebi" was released to the public on 20 February. The video was directed and produced by Žiga Krajnc who previously collaborated with Kralj and Šantl on the music videos for their singles "Baloni", "S teboi" and "Valovi".

== At Eurovision ==
According to Eurovision rules, all nations with the exceptions of the host country and the "Big Five" (France, Germany, Italy, Spain and the United Kingdom) are required to qualify from one of two semi-finals in order to compete for the final; the top ten countries from each semi-final progress to the final. The European Broadcasting Union (EBU) split up the competing countries into six different pots based on voting patterns from previous contests, with countries with favourable voting histories put into the same pot. On 28 January 2019, a special allocation draw was held which placed each country into one of the two semi-finals, as well as which half of the show they would perform in. Slovenia was placed into the first semi-final, to be held on 14 May 2019, and was scheduled to perform in the first half of the show.

Once all the competing songs for the 2019 contest had been released, the running order for the semi-finals was decided by the shows' producers rather than through another draw, so that similar songs were not placed next to each other. Slovenia was set to perform in position 5, following the entry from Poland and before the entry from the Czech Republic.

In Slovenia, the semi-finals were televised on TV SLO 2 and the final was televised on TV SLO 1 with commentary by Andrej Hofer. The Slovenian spokesperson, who announced the top 12-point score awarded by the Slovenian jury during the final, was Lea Sirk who represented Slovenia in the Eurovision Song Contest 2018.

=== Semi-final ===
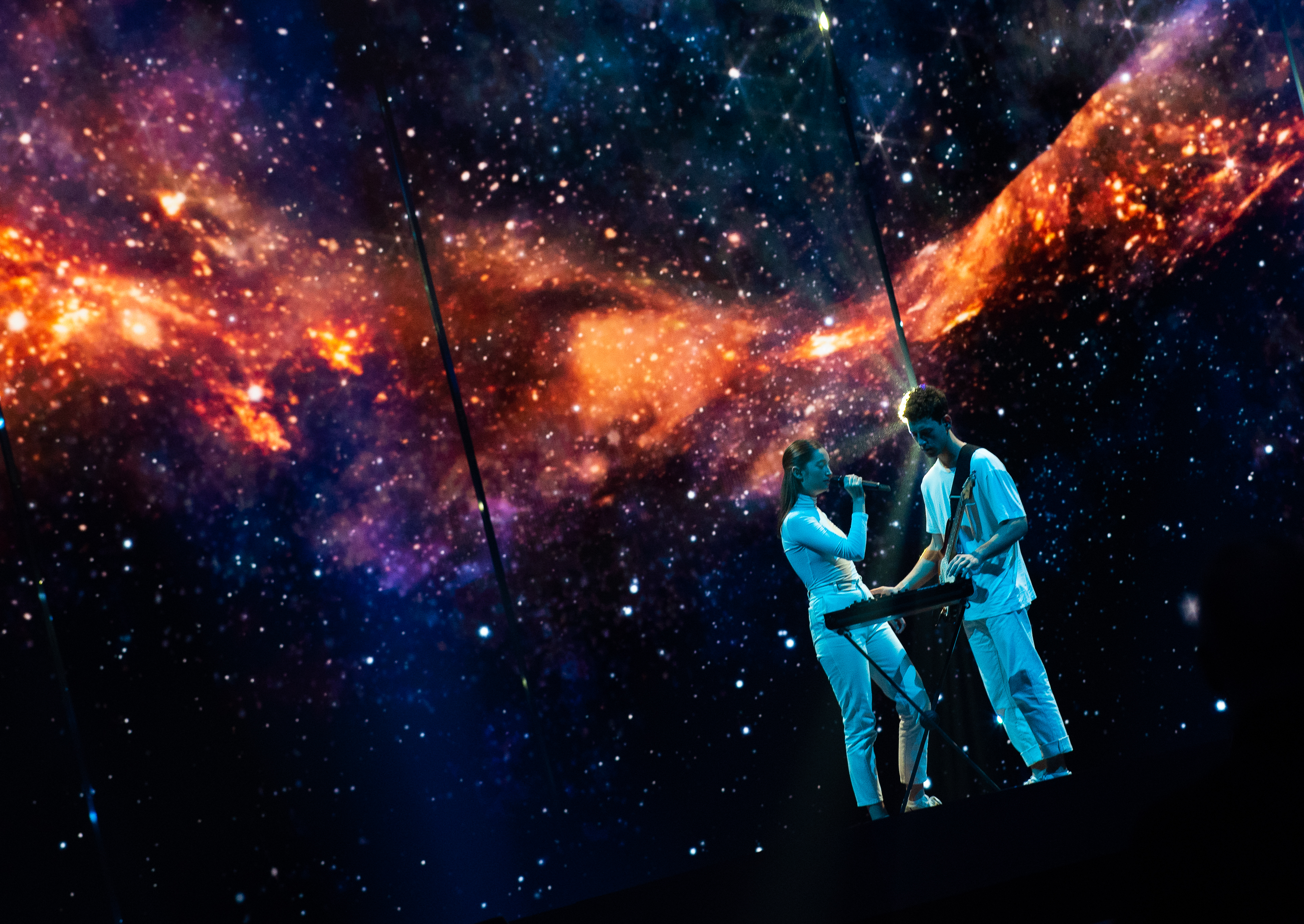
Zala Kralj and Gašper Šantl during a rehearsal before the first semi-final

Zala Kralj and Gašper Šantl took part in technical rehearsals on 4 and 9 May, followed by dress rehearsals on 13 and 14 May. This included the jury show on 13 May where the professional juries of each country watched and voted on the competing entries.

The Slovenian performance featured Zala Kralj and Gašper Šantl both dressed in white; Kralj performed vocals on stage while Šantl held a guitar behind a mixing keyboard. The stage colours were dark and the LED screens and floor displayed an encircling galaxy and starry night scene. The Slovenian performance was directed by Igorja Zupeta.

At the end of the show, Slovenia was announced as having finished in the top 10 and subsequently qualifying for the grand final. It was later revealed that Slovenia placed sixth in the semi-final, receiving a total of 167 points: 93 points from the televoting and 74 points from the juries.

=== Final ===
Shortly after the first semi-final, a winners' press conference was held for the ten qualifying countries. As part of this press conference, the qualifying artists took part in a draw to determine which half of the grand final they would subsequently participate in. This draw was done in the order the countries were announced during the semi-final. Slovenia was drawn to compete in the first half. Following this draw, the shows' producers decided upon the running order of the final, as they had done for the semi-finals. Slovenia was subsequently placed to perform in position 10, following the entry from Sweden and before the entry from Cyprus.

Zala Kralj and Gašper Šantl once again took part in dress rehearsals on 17 and 18 May before the final, including the jury final where the professional juries cast their final votes before the live show. The duo performed a repeat of their semi-final performance during the final on 18 May. Slovenia placed fifteenth in the final, scoring 105 points: 59 points from the televoting and 46 points from the juries.

=== Voting ===
Voting during the three shows involved each country awarding two sets of points from 1–8, 10 and 12: one from their professional jury and the other from televoting. Each nation's jury consisted of five music industry professionals who are citizens of the country they represent, with their names published before the contest to ensure transparency. This jury judged each entry based on: vocal capacity; the stage performance; the song's composition and originality; and the overall impression by the act. In addition, no member of a national jury was permitted to be related in any way to any of the competing acts in such a way that they cannot vote impartially and independently. The individual rankings of each jury member as well as the nation's televoting results will be released shortly after the grand final.

Below is a breakdown of points awarded to Slovenia and awarded by Slovenia in the first semi-final and grand final of the contest, and the breakdown of the jury voting and televoting conducted during the two shows:

==== Points awarded to Slovenia ====
Points awarded to Slovenia (Semi-final 1)
Score	Televote	Jury
12 points		Czech Republic
10 points	Serbia	
8 points	Belarus; Montenegro; Poland	Poland; Portugal
7 points	Estonia; Finland; Hungary; Portugal	Georgia; Serbia
6 points		
5 points	Czech Republic; Georgia; Greece; Iceland	Cyprus; Finland; Iceland
4 points		Australia; San Marino; Spain
3 points	Belgium; San Marino; Spain	Hungary
2 points	France	
1 point		Greece; Montenegro

Points awarded to Slovenia (Final)
Score	Televote	Jury
12 points		
10 points	Croatia; Serbia	Czech Republic; Poland
8 points		
7 points	Estonia	
6 points	Russia	Finland
5 points	Belarus	
4 points	Montenegro; Poland	Azerbaijan; Georgia; Greece; Lithuania
3 points	Germany; Hungary	Portugal
2 points	Austria; Latvia; North Macedonia	
1 point	Finland	Spain

==== Points awarded by Slovenia ====
Points awarded by Slovenia (Semi-final 1)
Score	Televote	Jury
12 points	Serbia	Czech Republic
10 points	Iceland	Greece
8 points	Estonia	Belarus
7 points	Montenegro	Cyprus
6 points	Hungary	Belgium
5 points	Czech Republic	Serbia
4 points	Australia	Iceland
3 points	San Marino	Poland
2 points	Belarus	Hungary
1 point	Poland	Estonia

Points awarded by Slovenia (Final)
Score	Televote	Jury
12 points	North Macedonia	Czech Republic
10 points	Serbia	Azerbaijan
8 points	Italy	Italy
7 points	Iceland	Sweden
6 points	Norway	Netherlands
5 points	Netherlands	Switzerland
4 points	Switzerland	Denmark
3 points	Denmark	France
2 points	Australia	North Macedonia
1 point	Estonia	Malta

==== Detailed voting results ====
The following members comprised the Slovene jury:

- Žiga Klančar (jury chairperson) – music editor, head of music programme
- Urša Mihevc – singer, composer
- Ula Ložar – singer, represented Slovenia in the Junior Eurovision Song Contest 2014
- Mate Bro – musician, singer, composer, producer
- Urša Vlašič – lyricist

Detailed voting results from Slovenia (Semi-final 1)
R/O	Country	Jury							Televote	
R/O	Country	Ž. Klančar	U. Mihevc	U. Ložar	M. Bro	U. Vlašič	Rank	Points	Rank	Points
01	Cyprus	4	6	3	4	6	4	7	14	
02	Montenegro	7	8	10	10	11	11		4	7
03	Finland	14	12	14	14	9	14		15	
04	Poland	11	4	11	9	8	8	3	10	1
05	Slovenia									
06	Czech Republic	1	1	2	1	3	1	12	6	5
07	Hungary	9	9	7	13	5	9	2	5	6
08	Belarus	6	10	1	5	2	3	8	9	2
09	Serbia	8	7	5	3	4	6	5	1	12
10	Belgium	2	2	9	8	7	5	6	11	
11	Georgia	10	13	12	11	12	13		16	
12	Australia	13	15	6	6	15	12		7	4
13	Iceland	3	5	13	12	14	7	4	2	10
14	Estonia	12	11	4	7	13	10	1	3	8
15	Portugal	16	14	15	15	16	16		12	
16	Greece	5	3	8	2	1	2	10	13	
17	San Marino	15	16	16	16	10	15		8	3

Detailed voting results from Slovenia (Final)
R/O	Country	Jury							Televote	
R/O	Country	Ž. Klančar	U. Mihevc	U. Ložar	M. Bro	U. Vlašič	Rank	Points	Rank	Points
01	Malta	12	7	6	4	18	10	1	19	
02	Albania	18	16	17	17	9	17		12	
03	Czech Republic	1	1	11	2	13	1	12	15	
04	Germany	21	17	22	24	24	23		21	
05	Russia	20	18	20	13	14	19		11	
06	Denmark	5	5	9	8	6	7	4	8	3
07	San Marino	25	19	25	25	22	25		22	
08	North Macedonia	9	8	5	9	5	9	2	1	12
09	Sweden	6	3	4	14	4	4	7	13	
10	Slovenia									
11	Cyprus	13	12	14	11	12	16		20	
12	Netherlands	10	9	3	10	1	5	6	6	5
13	Greece	14	11	24	15	15	18		25	
14	Israel	19	24	23	22	19	24		23	
15	Norway	23	25	16	23	17	22		5	6
16	United Kingdom	7	6	21	21	21	14		24	
17	Iceland	2	10	18	18	7	11		4	7
18	Estonia	16	20	12	19	20	20		10	1
19	Belarus	8	13	10	6	10	12		18	
20	Azerbaijan	3	4	19	3	2	2	10	16	
21	France	15	23	2	16	3	8	3	17	
22	Italy	11	2	8	1	16	3	8	3	8
23	Serbia	17	14	7	7	8	13		2	10
24	Switzerland	4	15	1	12	11	6	5	7	4
25	Australia	24	22	13	5	23	15		9	2
26	Spain	22	21	15	20	25	21		14	
