= Adrian Gaxha =

Macedonian-Albanian singer and songwriter (born 1984)

Adrian Gaxha Адријан Гаџа
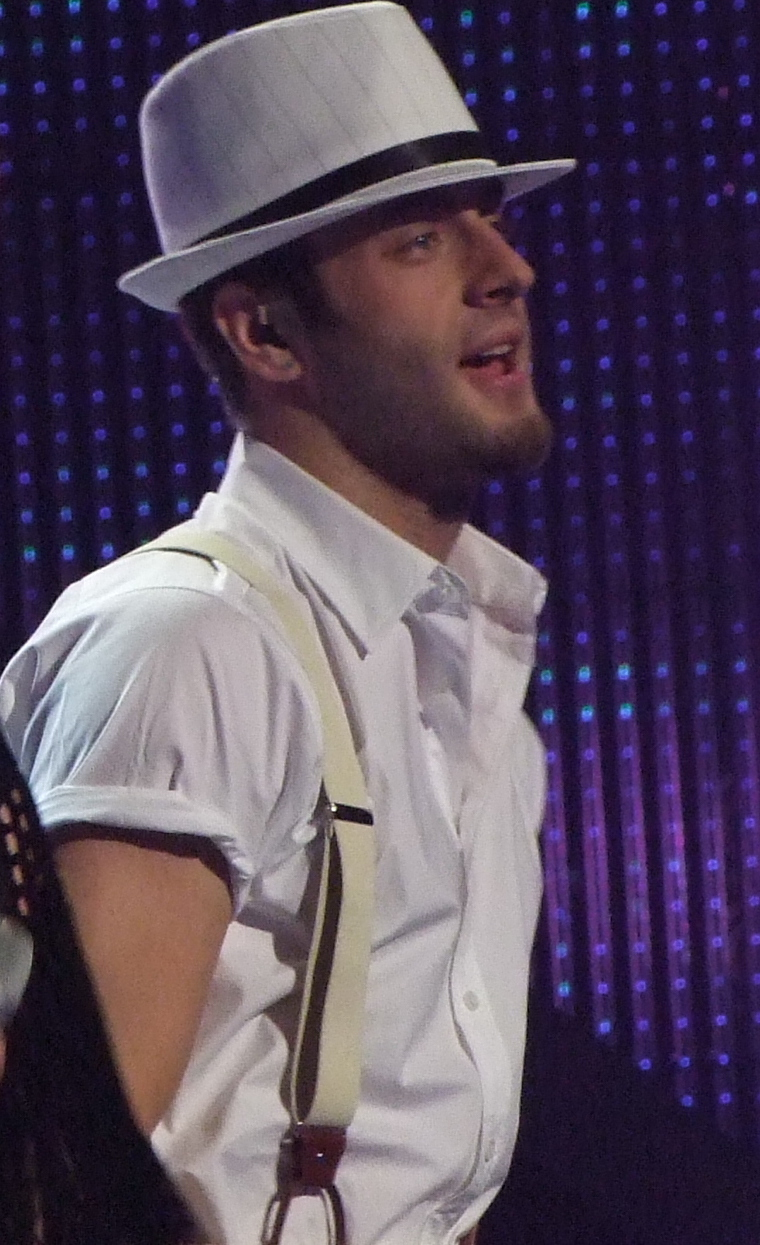
- Gaxha at the Eurovision Song Contest 2008

Background information
- Born: 13 February 1984 (age 42); Skopje, SR Macedonia, SFR Yugoslavia (modern North Macedonia)
- Occupations: Singer, songwriter, producer, dancer, entrepreneur
- Years active: 2001–present
- Label: Brick Records

Adrian Gaxha (Albanian: [adɾiˈan ˈgadʒa], Macedonian: Адријан Гаџа; born 13 February 1984) is an Albanian singer, songwriter, producer, dancer, and entrepreneur from North Macedonia.

== Life and career ==
Adrian Gaxha was born on 13 February 1984 into an Albanian family in the city of Skopje, then part of the Socialist Republic of Macedonia, present-day North Macedonia. Gaxha discovered his passion for music at an early age and started to play the viola. He commenced his early music career in 2001 simultaneously with his participation in Nota Fest. There, he won first prize, the first time a newcomer won both, the jury and the audience votes. Within a short time, Adrian became one of the most popular singers in Macedonia and Albania and other Albanian-speaking territories. Until today he has recorded four albums, three in Albanian and one in Macedonian.

His performances usually include a lot of skillful dance choreography. He has also participated in festivals such as Videofest in Pristina, Makfest in Štip, and has won the first prize at Ohrid Fest. In 2006, he finished second at the Macedonian national preselection for Eurovision, singing the song "Ljubov e" with the Macedonian-Romani legendary singer Esma Redzepova.

In 2008, Gaxha, alongside Tamara Todevska and Vrčak, won the pre-selection competition Skopje Fest and represented Macedonia in the Eurovision Song Contest 2008 with the song "Let Me Love You". After their performance in the second semi-final, the country failed to qualify for the grand final constituting its first overall non-qualification placing 10th with 64 points.

Since 2008, Gaxha has been focusing more in the Albanian-language songs and the Albanian market. He participated in Kënga Magjike 2012, with Florian Beqiri singing the song "Ngjyra e kuqe" (The red color) and placed Top 10. The song was an instant hit on the radios and on social media, especially on YouTube where the song counts more than 49 million views. After the festival, he released "Kjo zemër" (This heart), who received similar success.

In 2026, Adrian Gaxha and his partner, Sidorela Dauti, welcomed their first child, making the singer a father for the first time.

== Discography ==
=== Albums ===
- Luj, Luj, Luj (2003)
- Thuaj Mamit (2004)
- 300 Godini (2008)
- Brenduar (2010)

=== Singles ===
==== As lead artist ====
Title	Year	Peak chart positions	Album
Title	Year	ALB	Album
"Jeto"	2001	—N/a	Luj, luj, luj
"Capkene"	2003	—N/a	Luj, luj, luj
"Shqipes"	2004	—N/a	Thuaj Mamit
"Thuaj Mamit"	2004	—N/a	Thuaj Mamit
"Ku je xhan"	2005	—N/a	Non-album single
"300 vjet për ty"	2006	—N/a	Non-album single
"Të lutëm kthehu"	2006	—N/a	Non-album single
"Sensacion dashurie" (featuring Manjola Nallbani)	2007	—N/a	Non-album single
"Magija" (with Jovan Jovanov and Vrčak)	2007	—N/a	Non-album single
"Let Me Love You" (with Tamara Todevska and Vrčak)	2008	—N/a	Non-album single
"Ti tani" (featuring Snow Black)	2009	—N/a	Non-album single
"Si kjo raki" (with Ramadan Krasniqi)	2009	—N/a	Non-album single
"E brenduar"	2010	—N/a	Non-album single
"Edhe një here"	2010	—N/a	Non-album single
"Tripuvam"	2010	—N/a	Non-album single
"Fundin tek une e ke"	2011	—N/a	Non-album single
"Me ty"	2011	—N/a	Non-album single
"Ngjyra e kuqe" (featuring Florian Beqiri)	2012	—N/a	Non-album single
"Kjo zemër" (featuring Florian Beqiri)	2013	—N/a	Non-album single
"Welcome to Prishtina" (with Florian Beqiri featuring Skivi)	2013	—N/a	Non-album single
"Oj ti qik" (with Florian Beqiri)	2014	—N/a	Non-album single
"Kalle" (featuring Lindon Berisha)	2015	13	Non-album single
"Asnihere" (featuring Lindon Berisha)	2015	4	Non-album single
"Money" (featuring Lindon Berisha)	2016	—	Non-album single
"My girl" (with Franques)	2016	15	Non-album single
"Ka je 2x" (featuring Ronela Hajati)	2017	—	Non-album single
"Lujmi krejt" (featuring Onat)	2018	—	Non-album single
"Lady Malena" (featuring Vig Poppa)	2018	—	Non-album single
"Ajshe" (featuring Enur)	2019	—	Non-album single
"—" denotes a recording that did not chart or was not released in that territory.

Awards and achievements
Preceded by Karolina Gočeva with "Mojot svet"	Macedonia in the Eurovision Song Contest (with Tamara and Vrčak); 2008	Succeeded by Next Time with "Nešto što kje ostane"
