= Macedonia in the Eurovision Song Contest 2008 =

- Eurovision Song Contest 2008
- Participating broadcaster: Macedonian Radio Television (MRT)
- Country: Macedonia
- Selection process: Skopje Fest 2008
- Selection date: 23 February 2008

Competing entry
- Song: "Let Me Love You"
- Artist: Tamara, Vrčak and Adrian
- Songwriters: Rade Vrčakovski

Placement
- Semi-final result: Failed to qualify (10th)

Participation chronology

Macedonia (Note: Officially under the provisional appellation "former Yugoslav Republic of Macedonia", abbreviated "FYR Macedonia".) was represented at the Eurovision Song Contest 2008 with the song "Let Me Love You", written by Rade Vrčakovski, and performed by Tamara, Vrčak and Adrian. The Macedonian participating broadcaster, Macedonian Radio Television (MRT), organised Skopje Fest 2008 in order to select its entry for the contest. Fifteen entries competed in the competition on 23 February 2008 where "Vo ime na ljubovta" performed by Tamara, Vrčak and Adrian was selected following the combination of votes from a five-member jury panel and a public televote. The song was later translated from Macedonian to English for Eurovision and was titled "Let Me Love You".

Macedonia was drawn to compete in the second semi-final of the Eurovision Song Contest which took place on 22 May 2008. Performing during the show in position 18, "Let Me Love You" was not announced among the 10 qualifying entries of the second semi-final and therefore did not qualify to compete in the final. This marked the first time that Macedonia failed to qualify to the final of the Eurovision Song Contest from a semi-final since the introduction of semi-finals in 2004. It was later revealed that Macedonia placed tenth out of the 19 participating countries in the semi-final with 64 points.

== Background ==
Prior to the 2008 contest, contest, Macedonian Radio Television (MRT) had participated in the Eurovision Song Contest representing Macedonia seven times since its first entry in 1998. Its best result in the contest to this point was twelfth, achieved in 2006 with the song "Ninanajna" performed by Elena Risteska. Following the introduction of semi-finals for the 2004 contest, Macedonia had featured in every final.

As part of its duties as participating broadcaster, MRT organises the selection of its entry in the Eurovision Song Contest and broadcasts the event in the country. The broadcaster confirmed its intentions to participate at the 2008 contest on 28 November 2007. MRT had selected all its entries for the contest using a national final. For 2008, it returned to use the music festival Skopje Fest as a national final to select the entry.

== Before Eurovision ==
=== Skopje Fest 2008 ===
Skopje Fest 2008 was a song contest organised by MRT that served as a national final to select its entry for the Eurovision Song Contest 2008. Fifteen entries participated in the competition which took place on 23 February 2008 at the Metropolis Arena in Skopje, hosted by Živkica Gjurčinovska and Borislav Tnokovski and was broadcast on MTV 1 and MTV Sat.

==== Competing entries ====
A submission period was opened for interested artists and composers to submit their songs between 30 November 2007 and 31 December 2007. MRT received 130 submissions at the closing of the deadline. Fifteen entries were selected from the open submissions, while an additional six entries were submitted by well-known composers directly invited by MRT for the competition. The twenty-one competing artists and songs were announced on 12 January 2008 during a press conference at the M-1 Studio in Skopje.

On 14 January 2008, MRT announced that all six entries written by invited composers: "Apolon" performed by Maja Vukićević, "Kubana" performed by Agon and Džoksi, "Životot e tvoj" performed by Sanja Lefkova, "Slatka mala" performed by Igor Šarevski, "Eden čekor ili dva" performed by Filip Jordanovski and "Holivud" performed by Bojan and Big Mama were withdrawn from the competition due to negative reactions from composers of the entries selected from the open submissions.

Artist	Song	Songwriter(s)
Aneta Kačurkova	"Poraka" (Порака)	Robert Bilbilov, Aneta Kačurkova
Elvir Mekić	"Armija" (Армиjа)	Jovan Jovanov, Elvir Mekić
Goran Naumovski	"Tajna skriena" (Таjна скриена)	Saša Vučković
Igor Mitrović	"Jas i ti" (Jас и ти)	Vladimir Dojčinovski, Vesna Malinova
Jova Radevska	"Jas sum ovde" (Jас сум овде)	Jova Radevska
Lambe Alabakoski	"Zemjo moja" (Земjо моjа)	Darko Dimitrov, Lambe Alabakovski, Maksim Ristevski
Nokaut	"Samovila" (Самовила)	Nikola Perevski, Vladimir Krstevski
None Nedelkovska	"Vrati se" (Врати се)	Kristijan Gabroski
Parketi	"Strawberry"	Sašo Parket
Risto Samardžiev and Flash	"Dojdi do mene" (Доjди до мене)	Risto Samardžiev
Sašo Gigov-Giš	"Docna e" (Доцна е)	Grigor Koprov
Sonja Tarčulovska	"Sever i jug" (Север и jуг)	Mesrur Sait, Vesna Malinova
Tamara, Vrčak and Adrian	"Vo ime na ljubovta" (Во име на љубовта)	Rade Vrčakovski
Tuna	"Prašuvam bez glas" (Прашувам без глас)	Darko Dimitrov, Maksim Ristevski
Vlatko Ilievski	"So drugi zborovi" (Со други зборови)	Vlatko Ilievski

==== Final ====
The final took place on 23 February 2008. Fifteen entries competed and a 50/50 combination of public televoting and a five-member jury panel selected "Vo ime na ljubovta" performed by Tamara, Vrčak and Adrian as the winner. The jury panel consisted of Kire Kostov (composer and conductor), Sanja Šuplevska-Boiral (violinist), Vesna Maljanovska (musicologist and music journalist), Anita Latifi (journalist) and Lidija Kočovska (singer). In addition to the performances of the competing entries, the competition featured guest performances by Makmodels, Silvi Bend, Ruslan Alekhno (who represented Belarus in 2008), and Hari Mata Hari (who represented Bosnia and Herzegovina in 2006). The show also featured a tribute to Toše Proeski (who represented Macedonia in 2004) who died in 2007.

Final – 23 February 2008
R/O	Artist	Song	Jury	Televote		Total	Place
R/O	Artist	Song	Jury	Votes	Points	Total	Place
1	Sašo Gigov-Giš	"Docna e"	7	1,420	5	12	4
2	Aneta Kačurkova	"Poraka"	2	195	0	2	12
3	Parketi	"Strawberry"	5	953	3	8	6
4	Risto Samardžiev and Flash	"Dojdi do mene"	10	1,761	7	17	3
5	Tuna	"Prašuvam bez glas"	6	615	0	6	7
6	Lambe Alabakoski	"Zemjo moja"	8	2,401	10	18	2
7	Elvir Mekić	"Armija"	0	1,588	6	6	8
8	Goran Naumovski	"Tajna skriena"	0	150	0	0	14
9	Tamara, Vrčak and Adrian	"Vo ime na ljubovta"	12	3,441	12	24	1
10	Vlatko Ilievski	"So drugi zborovi"	0	827	1	1	13
11	None Nedelkovska	"Vrati se"	3	857	2	5	9
12	Jova Radevska	"Jas sum ovde"	0	1,026	4	4	10
13	Igor Mitrović	"Jas i ti"	0	121	0	0	15
14	Sonja Tarčulovska	"Sever i jug"	1	2,086	8	9	5
15	Nokaut	"Samovila"	4	222	0	4	11

=== Preparation ===
It was revealed in late March that "Vo ime na ljubovta" would be performed in English at the Eurovision Song Contest as "Let Me Love You". Vrčak worked with Macedonian producers Valentino Skenderovski and Robert Bilbilov to create the final version of the song in the Netherlands, which was released on 7 April along with its Turkish, Albanian, Serbian, and Russian language versions.

=== Promotion ===
Tamara, Vrčak and Adrian made several appearances across Europe to specifically promote "Let Me Love You" as the Macedonian Eurovision entry. On 2 March, Tamara, Vrčak and Adrian performed "Let Me Love You" during the presentation show of the 2008 Bosnian Eurovision entry, BH Eurosong Show 2008. The trio also performed the song during the semi-final of the Serbian Eurovision national final Beovizija 2008 on 9 March.

== At Eurovision ==
It was announced in September 2007 that the competition's format would be expanded to two semi-finals in 2008. According to Eurovision rules, all nations with the exceptions of the host country and the "Big Four" (France, Germany, Spain, and the United Kingdom) are required to qualify from one of two semi-finals in order to compete for the final; the top nine songs from each semi-final as determined by televoting progress to the final, and a tenth was determined by back-up juries. The European Broadcasting Union (EBU) split up the competing countries into six different pots based on voting patterns from previous contests, with countries with favourable voting histories put into the same pot. On 28 January 2008, a special allocation draw was held which placed each country into one of the two semi-finals. Bulgaria was placed into the second semi-final, to be held on 22 May 2008. The running order for the semi-finals was decided through another draw on 17 March 2008 and as one of the six wildcard countries, Macedonia chose to perform in position 18, following the entry from Cyprus and before the entry from Portugal.

The two semi-finals and final were broadcast in Macedonia on MTV 1 and MTV Sat with commentary by Milanka Rašić. MRT appointed Ognen Janeski as its spokesperson to announce the Macedonian votes during the final.

=== Semi-final ===
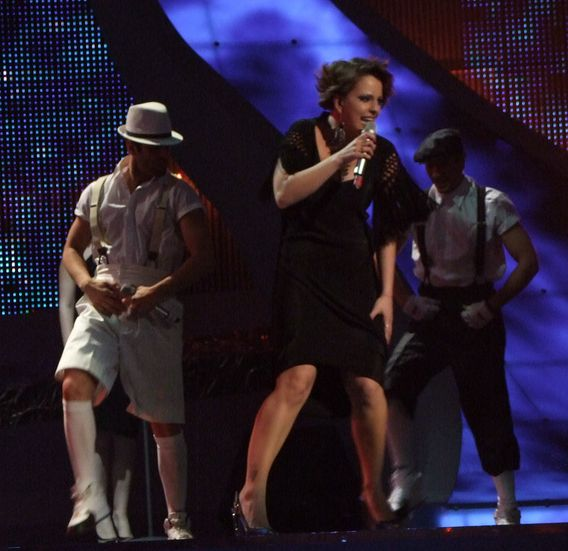
Tamara, Vrčak and Adrian performing during the second semi-final

Tamara, Vrčak and Adrian took part in technical rehearsals on 14 and 17 May, followed by dress rehearsals on 21 and 22 May. The Macedonian performance featured Tamara, Vrčak and Adrian performing together with two dancers and a backing vocalist; Tamara wore a black dress while Vrčak and Adrian were in white outfits. The background LED screens displayed blue and white colours. The two dancers that joined Tamara, Vrčak and Adrian on stage were Aleksa Raifović and Toma Đorđević and the backing vocalist was Nade Talevska.

At the end of the show, Macedonia was not announced among the 10 qualifying entries in the second semi-final and therefore failed to qualify to compete in the final. This marked the first time that Macedonia failed to qualify to the final of the Eurovision Song Contest from a semi-final since the introduction of semi-finals in 2004. It was later revealed that Macedonia placed tenth in the semi-final, receiving a total of 64 points; and whilist it would have been enough to qualify in previous and upcoming years, in 2008 and 2009 only the top nine places qualified automatically and the tenth place was decided based on the votes of the backup juries, and this time, juries chose Sweden to qualify over Macedonia.

=== Voting ===
Below is a breakdown of points awarded to Macedonia and awarded by Macedonia in the first semi-final and grand final of the contest. The nation awarded its 12 points to Albania in the semi-final and the final of the contest.

==== Points awarded to Macedonia ====
Points awarded to Macedonia (Semi-final 2)
Score	Country
12 points	Croatia; Serbia
10 points	Bulgaria
8 points	Switzerland
7 points	Albania; Turkey
6 points	
5 points	
4 points	Czech Republic
3 points	
2 points	Denmark; Sweden
1 point	

==== Points awarded by Macedonia ====
Points awarded by Macedonia (Semi-final 2)
Score	Country
12 points	Albania
10 points	Croatia
8 points	Turkey
7 points	Bulgaria
6 points	Ukraine
5 points	Czech Republic
4 points	Latvia
3 points	Denmark
2 points	Georgia
1 point	Switzerland

Points awarded by Macedonia (Final)
Score	Country
12 points	Albania
10 points	Serbia
8 points	Azerbaijan
7 points	Turkey
6 points	Russia
5 points	Bosnia and Herzegovina
4 points	Ukraine
3 points	Greece
2 points	Croatia
1 point	Armenia
