= Moldova in the Eurovision Song Contest 2019 =

- Eurovision Song Contest 2019
- Participating broadcaster: TeleRadio-Moldova (TRM)
- Country: Moldova
- Selection process: O melodie pentru Europa 2019
- Selection date: 2 March 2019

Competing entry
- Song: "Stay"
- Artist: Anna Odobescu
- Songwriters: Georgios Kalpakidis; Thomas Reil; Jeppe Reil; Maria Broberg

Placement
- Semi-final result: Failed to qualify (12th)

Participation chronology

Moldova was represented at the Eurovision Song Contest 2019 with the song "Stay" written by Georgios Kalpakidis, Thomas Reil, Jeppe Reil and Maria Broberg. The song was performed by Anna Odobescu. The Moldovan broadcaster TeleRadio-Moldova (TRM) organised the national final O melodie pentru Europa 2019 in order to select the Moldovan entry for the 2019 contest in Tel Aviv, Israel. 28 entries competed to represent Moldova in Tel Aviv, with 10 being shortlisted to participate in the televised national final which took place on 2 March 2019 after auditioning in front of a jury panel. "Stay" performed by Anna Odobescu emerged as the winner after gaining the most points following the combination of votes from a jury panel and a public televote.

Moldova was drawn to compete in the second semi-final of the Eurovision Song Contest which took place on 16 May 2019. Performing during the show in position 3, "Stay" was not announced among the top 10 entries of the second semi-final and therefore did not qualify to compete in the final. It was later revealed that Moldova placed twelfth out of the 18 participating countries in the semi-final with 85 points.

== Background ==
Prior to the 2019 Contest, Moldova had participated in the Eurovision Song Contest fourteen times since its first entry in 2005. The nation's best placing in the contest was third, which it achieved in 2017 with the song "Hey, Mamma!" performed by SunStroke Project. To this point, Moldova have achieved another three top ten placings at the contest: in 2005 where "Boonika bate toba" performed by Zdob și Zdub placed sixth, in 2007 where "Fight" performed by Natalia Barbu placed tenth, and in 2018 where "My Lucky Day" performed by DoReDoS also placed tenth.

The Moldovan national broadcaster, TeleRadio-Moldova (TRM), broadcast the event within Moldova and organised the selection process for the nation's entry. TRM confirmed their intentions to participate at the 2019 Eurovision Song Contest on 7 November 2018. Moldova has selected their entry via a national selection show since 2008, a procedure that was continued for their 2019 participation.

== Before Eurovision ==
=== O melodie pentru Europa 2019 ===
O melodie pentru Europa 2019 was the national final format developed by TRM in order to select Moldova's entry for the Eurovision Song Contest 2019. The event took place at the TRM Studio 2 in Chișinău, hosted by Elena Băncilă, Iurie Gologan and Doina Stimpovschii with Daniela Crudu reporting from the green room, and included a final to be held on 2 March 2019. The show was broadcast on Moldova 1, Radio Moldova Actualități, Radio Moldova Tineret and Radio Moldova Muzical as well as online via the broadcaster's official website trm.md.

==== Competing entries ====
Artists and composers had the opportunity to submit their entries between 14 December 2018 and 18 January 2019. Artists could submit more than one song, and an international act was able to compete only if they were part of a duo or group where 50% of the lead vocalists were of Moldovan nationality. At the conclusion of the submission deadline, 28 valid entries were received by the broadcaster. The live audition round took place on 2 February 2019 at TRM Studio 2 in Chișinău where 10 finalists were selected to advance. The auditions were broadcast on Moldova 2 as well as online via trm.md and via TRM's Facebook and YouTube pages. The jury panel that evaluated the songs during the live auditions and selected the 10 finalists consisted of Vali Boghean (instrumentist, actor, composer), Cristina Scarlat (singer, 2014 Moldovan Eurovision entrant), Andrei Tostogan (singer, composer and producer), Ilona Stepan (conductor) and Alexandru Gorgos (composer). Entries were assessed on criteria such as voice quality, stage presence and strength of the composition.

Artist	Song	Songwriter(s)
Anna Odobescu	"Stay"	Georgios Kalpakidis, Thomas Reil, Jeppe Reil, Maria Broberg
Aurel Chirtoacă	"La cinema"	Aurel Chirtoacă, Dumitru Rau
Che-MD feat. Elizaveta Ivasiuk	"Sub pămînt"	Michael Smolenko
Diana Brescan	"Lies"	Samuel Bugia Garrido, Roxana Elekes
Lemonique	"Gravity"	Anton Ragoza, Dumitru Golban, Maria Gospodinova, Sergiu Ionas
Marcela Scripcaru	"Meteor"	Rob Price
Maxim Zavidia	"I Will Not Surrender"	Primož Poglajen, Michael James Down, Jonas Gladnikoff, Will Taylor
Siaj	"Olimp"	Siaj, Victor Nguyen, Ruslan Ciotu, Stefan Postoronca, Dumitru Rusu, Marian Ungur
Tinna Gi	"Virus"	Cristina Coșciug
Vera Țurcanu	"Cold"	David Gällring, Karl Sahlin, Vera Țurcanu, Nikos Sofis

==== Final ====
The final took place on 2 March 2019. Ten songs competed and the winner was selected based on the combination of a public televote and the votes of an expert jury. The jury that voted in the final included Anatol Chiriac (composer), Ilona Stepan (conductor), Eugen Damaschin (director and screenwriter), Andrei Tostogan (singer, composer and producer), Iurie Mahovici (professor at the Academy of Music, Theatre and Fine Arts), Bruno (singer) and Nelly Ciobanu (singer, 2009 Moldovan Eurovision entrant). In addition to the performances of the competing entries, 2008 Moldovan Eurovision entrant Geta Burlacu, 2014 Moldovan Eurovision entrant Cristina Scarlat, 2018 Moldovan Eurovision entrants DoReDoS, 2019 Romanian Eurovision entrant Ester Peony, singers Cristina Pintilie, Marcel and Cornelia Ștefăneț and Nelly Ciobanu, the dance troupe Black and White, and the Orchestra Frații Advahov and Angry Band performed as guests. "Stay" performed by Anna Odobescu was selected as the winner.

Final – 2 March 2019
R/O	Artist	Song	Jury		Televote		Total	Place
R/O	Artist	Song	Votes	Points	Votes	Points	Total	Place
1	Aurel Chirtoacă	"La cinema"	35	3	53	2	5	8
2 (Note: Due to technical difficulties in the performance, Vera Țurcanu was allowed to perform again after all the performances.)	Vera Țurcanu	"Cold"	44	8	140	7	15	4
3	Marcela Scripcaru	"Meteor"	37	4	40	1	5	7
4	Siaj	"Olimp"	34	2	70	3	5	9
5	Maxim Zavidia	"I Will Not Surrender"	38	5	938	12	17	2
6	Diana Brescan	"Lies"	52	10	103	5	15	3
7	Tinna Gi	"Virus"	41	6	119	6	12	6
8	Lemonique	"Gravity"	42	7	261	8	15	5
9	Anna Odobescu	"Stay"	75	12	264	10	22	1
10	Che-MD feat. Elizaveta Ivasiuk	"Sub pămînt"	8	1	81	4	5	10

=== Promotion ===
Anna Odobescu made several appearances across Europe to specifically promote "Stay" as the Moldovan Eurovision entry. On 5 March, Anna Odobescu performed "Stay" during the final of the Romanian Eurovision national final. On 14 April, Odobescu performed during the Eurovision in Concert event which was held at the AFAS Live venue in Amsterdam, Netherlands and hosted by Edsilia Rombley and Marlayne. On 21 April, Odobescu performed during the Eurovision Pre-Party Madrid event, which was held at the Sala La Riviera venue in Madrid, Spain and hosted by Tony Aguilar and Julia Varela. On 24 April, Anna Odobescu performing during the Eurovision Pre-Party, which was held at the Vegas City Hall in Moscow, Russia and hosted by Alexey Lebedev and Andres Safari.

== At Eurovision ==
According to Eurovision rules, all nations with the exceptions of the host country and the "Big Five" (France, Germany, Italy, Spain and the United Kingdom) are required to qualify from one of two semi-finals in order to compete for the final; the top ten countries from each semi-final progress to the final. The European Broadcasting Union (EBU) split up the competing countries into six different pots based on voting patterns from previous contests, with countries with favourable voting histories put into the same pot. On 28 January 2019, a special allocation draw was held which placed each country into one of the two semi-finals, as well as which half of the show they would perform in. Moldova was placed into the second semi-final, to be held on 16 May 2019, and was scheduled to perform in the first half of the show.

Once all the competing songs for the 2019 contest had been released, the running order for the semi-finals was decided by the shows' producers rather than through another draw, so that similar songs were not placed next to each other. Moldova was set to perform in position 3, following the entry from Ireland and before the entry from Switzerland.

The two semi-finals and the final were televised in Moldova on Moldova 1 as well as broadcast via radio on Radio Moldova. The Moldovan spokesperson, who announced the top 12-point score awarded by the Moldovan jury during the final, was Doina Stimpovschi.

=== Semi-final ===
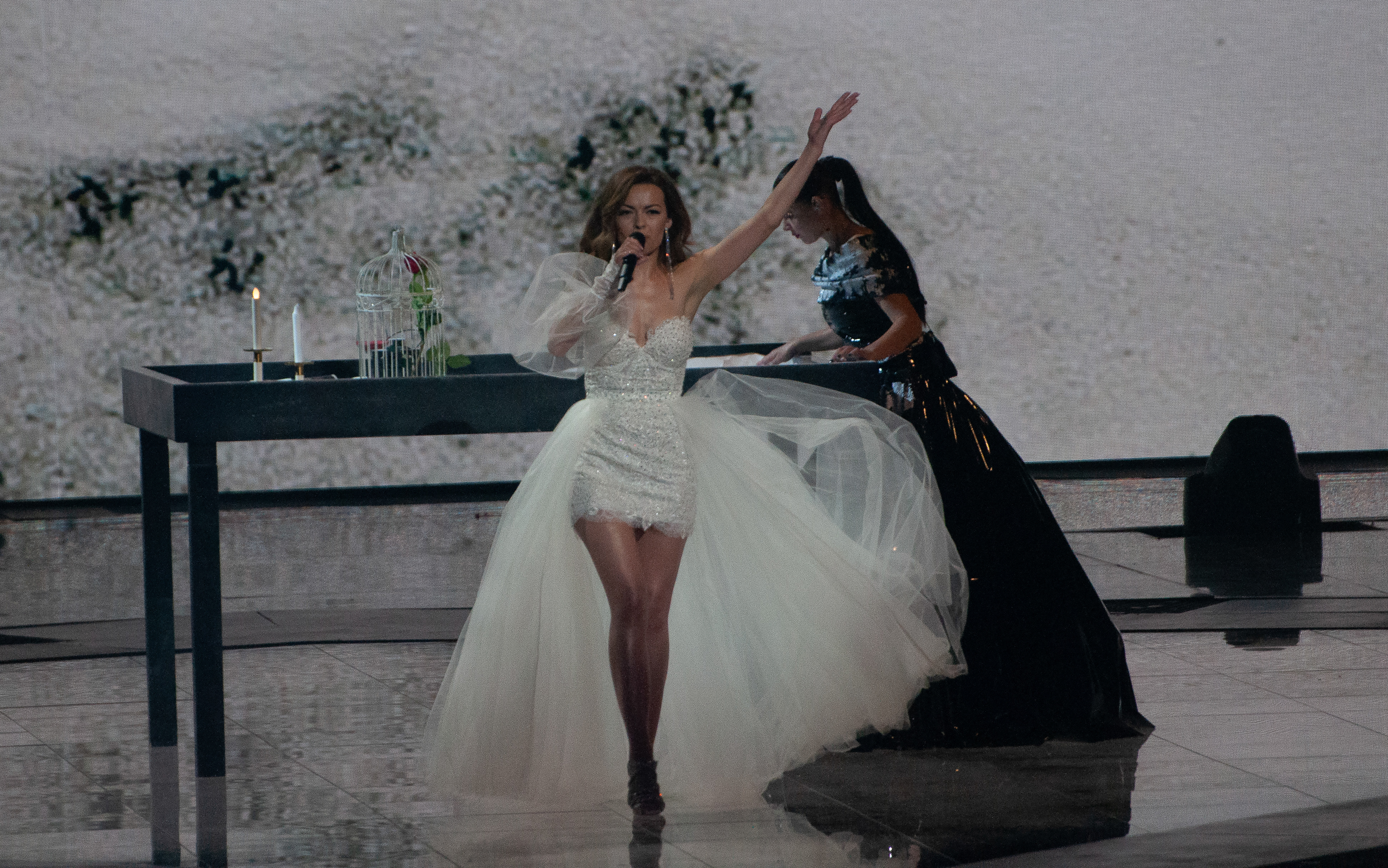
Anna Odobescu during a rehearsal before the second semi-final

Anna Odobescu took part in technical rehearsals on 6 and 10 May, followed by dress rehearsals on 15 and 16 May. This included the jury show on 15 May where the professional juries of each country watched and voted on the competing entries. The Moldovan delegation requested an additional technical rehearsal on 12 May, which was later approved by the EBU.

The Moldovan performance featured Odobescu dressed in a long white gown and performing on stage with a snow artist dressed in a long dark gown who worked on a table with candles and a rose in a golden birdcage. The snow art depicted a range of wild animals and natural settings and ended with an image of a galaxy with the rose being freed and placed on top. The stage featured LED screen projections of a pre-recorded video of the snow art's creation process. The snow artist that joined Odobescu on stage is Kseniya Simonova, who was previously part of the Ukrainian performance for the 2011 contest. Anna Odobescu was also joined by three off-stage backing vocalists: Andreea Portarescu, Andrei Ștefăneț and Mihaela Andrei.

At the end of the show, Moldova was not announced among the top 10 entries in the second semi-final and therefore failed to qualify to compete in the final. It was later revealed that Moldova placed twelfth in the semi-final, receiving a total of 85 points: 27 points from the televoting and 58 points from the juries.

=== Voting ===
Voting during the three shows involved each country awarding two sets of points from 1-8, 10 and 12: one from their professional jury and the other from televoting. Each nation's jury consisted of five music industry professionals who are citizens of the country they represent, with their names published before the contest to ensure transparency. This jury judged each entry based on: vocal capacity; the stage performance; the song's composition and originality; and the overall impression by the act. In addition, no member of a national jury was permitted to be related in any way to any of the competing acts in such a way that they cannot vote impartially and independently. The individual rankings of each jury member as well as the nation's televoting results were released shortly after the grand final.

Below is a breakdown of points awarded to Moldova and awarded by Moldova in the second semi-final and grand final of the contest, and the breakdown of the jury voting and televoting conducted during the two shows:

==== Points awarded to Moldova ====
Points awarded to Moldova (Semi-final 2)
Score	Televote	Jury
12 points	Romania	Romania
10 points		
8 points		
7 points		
6 points		Netherlands; Sweden
5 points	Italy; Russia	Armenia; Malta; Russia; Switzerland
4 points		United Kingdom
3 points	Armenia	Albania; Azerbaijan
2 points	Denmark	Croatia; Norway
1 point		

==== Points awarded by Moldova ====
Points awarded by Moldova (Semi-final 2)
Score	Televote	Jury
12 points	Romania	Romania
10 points	Russia	North Macedonia
8 points	Azerbaijan	Russia
7 points	Netherlands	Malta
6 points	Switzerland	Azerbaijan
5 points	Lithuania	Ireland
4 points	Norway	Armenia
3 points	Malta	Norway
2 points	Armenia	Albania
1 point	Latvia	Denmark

Points awarded by Moldova (Final)
Score	Televote	Jury
12 points	Russia	North Macedonia
10 points	Azerbaijan	Australia
8 points	San Marino	Czech Republic
7 points	Israel	Norway
6 points	Netherlands	Azerbaijan
5 points	Italy	Russia
4 points	Switzerland	Denmark
3 points	Norway	Netherlands
2 points	Czech Republic	Sweden
1 point	Iceland	Malta

==== Detailed voting results ====
The following members comprised the Moldovan jury:

- Corneliu Botgros (jury chairperson) – musician
- Vasile Olaru – composer, producer, singer
- Otilia Lozovanu – TV producer
- Igor Munteanu – dancer
- Geta Burlacu – singer, represented Moldova in the 2008 contest

Detailed voting results from Moldova (Semi-final 2)
R/O	Country	Jury							Televote	
R/O	Country	C. Botgros	V. Olaru	O. Lozovanu	I. Munteanu	G. Burlacu	Rank	Points	Rank	Points
01	Armenia	10	7	5	5	11	7	4	9	2
02	Ireland	5	3	14	8	10	6	5	14	
03	Moldova									
04	Switzerland	17	11	15	7	15	14		5	6
05	Latvia	16	10	16	14	8	15		10	1
06	Romania	1	1	1	1	1	1	12	1	12
07	Denmark	6	15	13	16	3	10	1	15	
08	Sweden	12	17	8	9	17	13		13	
09	Austria	8	9	17	15	9	11		17	
10	Croatia	15	16	10	13	12	17		12	
11	Malta	7	2	6	2	16	4	7	8	3
12	Lithuania	14	12	12	10	13	16		6	5
13	Russia	4	6	2	3	6	3	8	2	10
14	Albania	11	5	7	6	14	9	2	16	
15	Norway	3	13	11	12	5	8	3	7	4
16	Netherlands	13	14	9	17	7	12		4	7
17	North Macedonia	2	4	3	4	2	2	10	11	
18	Azerbaijan	9	8	4	11	4	5	6	3	8

Detailed voting results from Moldova (Final)
R/O	Country	Jury							Televote	
R/O	Country	C. Botgros	V. Olaru	O. Lozovanu	I. Munteanu	G. Burlacu	Rank	Points	Rank	Points
01	Malta	8	10	9	10	7	10	1	15	
02	Albania	19	14	22	26	20	23		25	
03	Czech Republic	7	3	4	8	3	3	8	9	2
04	Germany	4	18	10	12	14	12		24	
05	Russia	12	11	3	2	11	6	5	1	12
06	Denmark	5	5	5	16	8	7	4	17	
07	San Marino	21	22	23	25	17	25		3	8
08	North Macedonia	1	2	1	1	1	1	12	16	
09	Sweden	9	6	15	3	25	9	2	14	
10	Slovenia	23	25	24	24	22	26		20	
11	Cyprus	22	13	11	15	9	14		26	
12	Netherlands	6	7	12	7	6	8	3	5	6
13	Greece	15	24	18	21	18	22		13	
14	Israel	18	12	13	23	19	17		4	7
15	Norway	2	4	6	20	4	4	7	8	3
16	United Kingdom	13	23	20	19	15	19		22	
17	Iceland	25	26	25	22	10	20		10	1
18	Estonia	20	8	19	18	23	15		19	
19	Belarus	26	15	21	17	24	24		12	
20	Azerbaijan	11	1	16	6	5	5	6	2	10
21	France	14	16	7	9	12	13		18	
22	Italy	16	21	17	14	16	18		6	5
23	Serbia	17	19	14	13	13	16		23	
24	Switzerland	10	17	8	4	21	11		7	4
25	Australia	3	9	2	5	2	2	10	11	
26	Spain	24	20	26	11	26	21		21	
