= Georgios Kalpakidis =

Greek songwriter (born 1978)

- Also known as: Gorgi
- Born: April 27, 1978 (age 48); Tübingen, Germany
- Origin: Thessaloniki, Greece
- Genres: Pop; soft rock; pop/rock; dance
- Occupations: Songwriter; journalist; presenter
- Years active: 2002–present

Georgios Kalpakidis, also known as George Kalpakidis, Gorgi or GK (Greek: Γιώργος Καλπακίδης; born on 27 April 1978), is a Greek songwriter, former journalist, radio and TV host, best known for having composed the 2019 Eurovision Song Contest entry for Moldova, "Stay" by Anna Odobescu. He started his radio work at the age of 13 and continued his career in the media field until 2015. He made his television debut as a host on Europe One channel, with a show called "Join Me" and also started appearing as a guest host in several projects over the next few years, on other local stations. His breakthrough came in middle 2006, when a new contract brought him to one of the biggest national networks, Macedonia TV. It was during the Eurovision 2006 period in Athens, where he was given the task to cover the event and report daily on live TV. His "ESC '2006" special, entitled "Hard Rock Hallelujah", was noted as one of the shows with the highest ratings of the year.

Kalpakidis has been covering the Eurovision Song Contest as a journalist for radio and TV stations, magazines and newspapers from 2000 until 2008. He's also starred in two horror films in 2009 and 2010, directed by Nick Samaras. His musical steps began in 2003 when he decided to enter an online remix contest. He was the winner of the competition, having scored the maximum points, awarded by the voters who chose his rendition of the original "Adrenaline" by singer Maria Louiza Vasilopoulou (a.k.a. MLV). Even though it was announced that the prize would be a collaboration with the artist on her next album, MLV was dropped by her label therefore Kalpakidis didn’t receive his reward. The next year would mark the beginning of a still ongoing course, in the Eurovision Song Contest. Kalpakidis counts several entries in national selections, all over Europe.

== Entries in the Eurovision Song Contest ==
Year	Country	Artist	Song	Music // Lyrics	Final		Semifinal	
Year	Country	Artist	Song	Music // Lyrics	Place	Points	Place	Points
2019	Moldova	Anna Odobescu	"Stay"	Gorgi, T. Reil, J. Reil, M. Broberg	Failed to qualify		12th	85

== Entries in Eurovision Song Contest Pre-Selections ==
Year	Country	Artist	Song	Result	Music // Lyrics
2004	Lithuania	EVA	"Be My Baby"	10th	Gorgi
2005	Lithuania	EVA & Ceslovas Gabalis	"I'll Be There"	8th	Gorgi
2008	Lithuania	My Magic	"Lady"	5th (semifinal)	Gorgi // S. Engel
2008	(Republic of Ireland) Ireland	Nikki Kavanagh	"Destiny"	–	Gorgi
2008	Spain	Crystina Maez	"Nuestro Destino"	–	Gorgi // Santana, Loredo
2009	Poland	Nasty Ladies	"For Once In My Life"	–	Gorgi // S. Engel
2009	(Georgia (country)) Georgia	Tika Patsatsia	"Miracle"	4th	Gorgi
2010	Lithuania	Audrius Zavadskis	"Right Now"	8th (semifinal)	Gorgi
2010	(Republic of Ireland) Ireland	Nikki Kavanagh	"Sacred Fortune"	–	Gorgi
2011	Switzerland	Evelyn Zangger	"Who Do You Love?"	–	Gorgi
2011	Switzerland	Natalia Wohler	"Voulez Vous"	–	Gorgi
2011	Moldova	Marcel Rosca	"Voulez Vous"	–	Gorgi
2011	Lithuania	Aurelija Slavinskaite	"The End"	11th (semifinal)	Gorgi
2011	Portugal	Tania Tavares	"Se Esse Dia Chegar"	10th	Gorgi // T. Tavares, N. Valerio
2012	Belarus	George Koldun	"Heavy On My Heart"	–	G. Koldun // Gorgi
2012	Malta	Kaya	"First Time"	13th	Gorgi
2012	Moldova	Mariana Mihaila	"Live On Forever"	12th	Gorgi // A. O' Connor
2012	Lithuania	Donata Virbilaite	"Superman"	8th (semifinal)	A. Anastasiou // Gorgi
2012	Lithuania	DAR	"Home"	2nd	Gorgi, A. Martynenas // Gorgi
2013	Lithuania	DAR	"Jump!"	4th	Gorgi, A. Martynenas // Gorgi
2013	Lithuania	Samanta Tina & Vudis	"Hey Chiki Mama"	4th (first round)	A. Martynenas, Gorgi
2013	Belarus	Ivan Buslay	"Looking For Love"	–	Gorgi
2014	Lithuania	Vaidas Baumila	"Worlds Apart"	4th	Gorgi, Y. Malachi // Gorgi
2015	Switzerland	Kaya	"In And Out Of Love"	–	Gorgi, E. Rydmark
2015	Cyprus	Anastasia Liberos	"Unicorn"	–	Gorgi, Y. Persson, L. Persson, M. Antoniou // Gorgi
2016	Moldova	PRIZA	"Rewind"	11th (semifinal)	Gorgi, M. Huskic // Gorgi
2016	Moldova	Anna Gulko	"Never Let Go"	12th (semifinal)	Gorgi, W. Taylor // N. Sofis
2016	Malta	Corazon	"Falling Glass"	8th	Gorgi, J. Gladnikoff, S. Ljunggren
2017	Moldova	Max Fall	"If I Could"	–	Gorgi, S. Ekstrand // Gorgi, N. Sofis
2017	Lithuania	Virgis Valuntonis	"Victorious"	12th (first round)	Gorgi, J. Gladnikoff, S. Ljunggren
2017	Lithuania	Audrius Janonis	"Run"	8th (first round)	Gorgi, M. Huskic // N. Sofis
2018	Armenia	Suren Poghosyan	"The Voice"	10th (semifinal)	Gorgi, N. Turner, J. Gladnikoff
2018	Lithuania	Milda Martinkėnaitė	"Hurricane"	7th (first round)	Gorgi, T. Reil, J. Reil, M. Broberg
2018	Moldova	Anna Timofei	"Endlessly"	11th	Y. Persson, L. Persson, N. Bergqvist, S. Johansson // Gorgi
2019	Belarus	Angelika Pushnova	"Stop Breathing"	–	Gorgi, S. Ekstrand // Gorgi, N. Sofis
2019	Moldova	Anna Odobescu	"Stay"	1st	Gorgi, T. Reil, J. Reil, M. Broberg
2021	Belarus	CHAKRAS	"Waterfall"	–	Gorgi

== Participations in other festivals and contests ==
Year	Festival/Contest	Location	Artist	Song	Result	Songwriters
2003	Online Contest	Greece	MLV	"Adrenaline (Free Your Mind Remix)"	1st	Gorgi (Remix)
2004	Sunflower Festival	Zrenjanin, Serbia	EVA	"Be My Baby"	Finalist	Gorgi
2007	B.O.S. World Contest	Romania	Gorgi	"On My Own"	3rd	Gorgi
2009	International Short Film Festival	Drama, Greece	Gorgi	Original Soundtrack	–	Gorgi
2011	Gayvision Song Contest	Torremolinos, Spain	Alejandro Sanchez	"Es Logico"	2nd	Gorgi, J. J. Santana Rodriguez
2017	Eurokids International Contest	Maiori, Italy	Charlotte Summers	"Unicorn"	1st	Gorgi, Y. Persson, L. Persson // Gorgi
2019	Golden Stag Festival	Braşov, Romania	Anna Odobescu	"Dreaming"	–	Gorgi, N. Bergqvist, S. Johansson, G. Gorceag

== Further discography ==
Year	Artist	Song	Songwriters
2002	Gorgi	"(Is There) Anyone Out There" (Duran Duran Cover)	Duran Duran
2006	EVA	"Busiu Ten"	Gorgi
2006	EVA	"Istripstu Tenai"	Gorgi
2006	EVA	"Make It Right"	Gorgi
2009	Aleks Volasko	"Fant"	Gorgi
2010	Vilija Mataciunaite	"Lyg Pasaka"	Gorgi, V. Mataciunaite
2011	Kaya	"Your Touch"	Gorgi
2011	Vudis	"Gimme Your Love"	Vudis, Gorgi
2011	Vudis & Bartas	"Brand New Day"	A. Martinenas, Gorgi
2011	Tomas Bareika	"Sometimes"	T. Bareika, Gorgi
2012	Kaya	"Lonely Day"	Gorgi, A. O' Connor
2012	Vicky Cornick	"Hear What I Say"	Gorgi
2012	George Koldun	"Hypnotized"	G. Koldun, Gorgi
2012	George Koldun	"Song With No Name"	G. Koldun, Gorgi
2012	George Koldun	"Through The Light"	G. Koldun, Gorgi
2012	DAR	"Anytime"	A. Martynenas, Gorgi
2012	DAR	"Take Me Far"	A. Martynenas, Gorgi
2012	DAR	"Everybody Knows"	A. Martynenas, Gorgi
2012	Nikos Karakalpakis	"Turning the Tide"	Gorgi
2013	George Koldun & Anastasiya Sheverenko	"Hold Me Close"	G. Koldun, Gorgi
2013	Silva Hakobyan	"Leave A Light On"	Gorgi
2014	George Koldun	"Stop"	G. Koldun, Gorgi
2014	George Koldun	"The Girl With The Mysterious Eyes"	G. Koldun, Gorgi
2015	Daumantas	"I Come Undone"	A. Martynenas, Gorgi
2016	George Koldun	"You Make Me Wanna Kiss You"	G. Koldun, Gorgi
2017	Benjamin	"Still Believe"	Y. Persson, L. Persson, N. Bergqvist, S. Johansson, Gorgi
2018	Olga Przybysz	"Forever"	Gorgi, J. Gladnikoff, S. Ljunggren
2020	Sigurjón Örn	"Burn"	Gorgi, N. Bergqvist, S. Johansson, S. Böðvarsson
2020	VoColor feat. Eldar	"Until the End"	Gorgi, S. Ekstrand, N. Sofis
2020	Anna Odobescu	"My Oh My"	Gorgi
2021	Julian Lesiński	"Before I Go"	Gorgi, N. Bergqvist, S. Johansson
2024	Gorgi	"Giati"	Leif Evert Brixmark, Gorgi

== Remixes ==
Year	Artist	Song	Remix
2003	MLV	"Adrenaline"	Free Your Mind Remix
2008	Christian Deussen	"Lady"	Gorgi Remix
2010	Filipa Azevedo	"Ha Dias Assim"	Official Remix
2011	Jan Johansen	"It's Not Real"	Gorgi's Emperor Remix
2011	Joe Jonas	"Love Slayer"	Gorgi's King-of-Sorrow Remix

== Filmography ==
Year	Title	Role
2009	Greek Psycho Cannibal	Guy in car
2010	Conspiracy of Blood	Evil stepbrother
