= Romania in the Eurovision Song Contest 2019 =

- Eurovision Song Contest 2019
- Participating broadcaster: Televiziunea Română (TVR)
- Country: Romania
- Selection process: Selecția Națională 2019
- Selection date: 17 February 2019

Competing entry
- Song: "On a Sunday"
- Artist: Ester Peony
- Songwriters: Ester Alexandra Crețu; Alexandru Șerbu; Ioana Victoria Badea

Placement
- Semi-final result: Failed to qualify (13th)

Participation chronology

Romania was represented at the Eurovision Song Contest 2019 with the song "On a Sunday", written by Alexandru Șerbu, Ioana Victoria Badea and Ester Alexandra Crețu, and performed by Crețu under her stage name Ester Peony. The Romanian broadcaster Televiziunea Română (TVR) organised the national final Selecția Națională 2019 in order to select the Romanian entry for the 2019 contest in Tel Aviv, Israel. The national final consisted of three shows: two semi-finals on 27 January and 10 February 2019, respectively, and a final on 17 February 2019. A total of twenty-four entries were selected and twelve competed in each semi-final where a five-member jury panel selected five entries to advance to the final, while a public vote selected an additional entry to enter the final. The twelve qualifiers competed in the final where "On a Sunday" performed by Ester Peony was selected as the winner after scoring top marks from a six-member international jury panel and a public televote.

Romania was drawn to compete in the second semi-final of the Eurovision Song Contest which took place on 16 May 2019. Performing during the show in position 6, "On a Sunday" was not announced among the top 10 entries of the second semi-final and therefore did not qualify to compete in the final. It was later revealed that Romania placed thirteenth out of the 18 participating countries in the semi-final with 71 points.

== Background ==
Prior to the 2019 contest, Romania had participated in the Eurovision Song Contest 19 times since its first entry in 1994. To this point, its highest placing in the contest has been third place, which the nation achieved on two occasions: in 2005 with the song "Let Me Try" performed by Luminița Anghel and Sistem, and in 2010 with the song "Playing with Fire" performed by Paula Seling and Ovi. Having qualified to the final on every occasion since the introduction of semi-finals to the format of the contest between 2004 and 2017, Romania failed to qualify to the final for the first time in 2018 with the song "Goodbye" performed by the Humans.

The Romanian national broadcaster, Televiziunea Română (TVR), broadcasts the event within Romania and organizes the selection process for the nation's entry. TVR has consistently selected the Romanian Eurovision entry through national finals that feature a competition among several artists and songs. The broadcaster confirmed their intentions to participate at the 2019 Eurovision Song Contest on 20 September 2018. TVR had set up national finals with several artists to choose both the song and performer to compete at Eurovision for Romania, a procedure which the broadcaster opted for once again to select their 2019 entry.

== Before Eurovision ==
=== Selecția Națională 2019 ===
Selecția Națională 2019 was the national final organised by TVR in order to select Romania's entry for the Eurovision Song Contest 2019. The competition consisted of three shows: two semi-finals featuring twelve songs each and a final featuring twelve songs to be held on 27 January, 10 February and 17 February 2019, respectively. Under the slogan Împlineşte visul! ("Fulfill the dream!"), the shows were hosted by Ilinca Avram and Aurelian Temișan, and were televised on TVR 1, TVR HD, TVRi as well as online via the broadcaster's streaming service TVR+ and YouTube. The three shows were also broadcast in Moldova via the channel TVR Moldova.

==== Competing entries ====
TVR opened a submission period for artists and composers to submit their entries between 9 November 2018 and 10 December 2018. The broadcaster received 126 submissions after the submission deadline passed. An expert committee reviewed the received submissions with each juror on the committee rating each song between 1 (lowest) and 10 (highest) based on criteria such as the melodic harmony and structure of the song, the orchestral arrangement, originality and stylistic diversity of the composition and sound and voice quality. After the combination of the jury votes, the top twenty-four entries that scored the highest were selected for the national final. The competing entries were announced on 20 December 2018. Among the competing artists was Dan Bittman, who previously represented Romania in the Eurovision Song Contest in 1994, and Mihai, who previously represented Romania in the Eurovision Song Contest in 2006.

The members of the expert committee that selected the twenty-four entries were:

- George Balint – Realitatea Muzicală music journalist
- Felix Crainicu – Radio România Actualități host
- Horea Ghibuţiu – unsitedemuzica.ro music journalist
- Bogdan Miu – DigiFM music journalist and host
- Bogdan Pavlică – Radio România Actualități host
- Răzvan Popescu – Radio ZU host
- Andreea Remeţan – Virgin Radio Romania host
- Gabriel Scîrlet – TVR musical director
- Oliver Simionescu – Kiss FM disc jockey
- Liana Stanciu – TVR music journalist
- Dragoş Vulgaris – Pro FM and Chill FM music journalist

On 2 January 2019, "Pierd", written and to have been performed by Dan Bittman, was withdrawn from the competition and replaced with the songs "Army of Love" performed by Bella Santiago and "Renegades" performed by Linda Teodosiu after TVR opened an additional submission period between 8 and 10 January 2019, during which 9 submissions were received. "Baya", written by Mihai Trăistariu, Michael James Down, Will Taylor and to have been performed by Mihai, and "Independent", written by Alex Luft, Eduard Santha, Denisa Demian and Alexandra Șipoș and to have been performed by Xandra, were withdrawn from the competition on 12 January and 8 February 2019, respectively.

Competing entries
| Artist | Song | Songwriter(s) |
|---|---|---|
| 2 Gents | "Ielele" | Alexandru Antonescu, Cătălin Tamazlicaru, Ciprian Rogojan, Doru Todoruț |
| Aldo Blaga | "Your Journey" | Aldo Blaga, Olivier Bassil, Nicoleta Roman |
| Bella Santiago | "Army of Love" | Resciebelle Barrios Santiago, Alexandru Luft |
| Berniceya | "The Call: Dynasty of Love" | Florin Chitiul |
| Claudiu Mirea | "We Are the Ones" | Mihai Ogășanu, Claudiu Mirea |
| Dya and Lucian Colareza | "Without You (Sin ti)" | Sergi Gascon, Daniel Andres Giraldo Mazo |
| Echoes | "High Heels On" | Liviu Elekes, Claudiu Dănăilă, Pavel Petricenco |
| Ester Peony | "On a Sunday" | Ester Alexandra Crețu, Alexandru Șerbu, Ioana Victoria Badea |
| The Four | "Song of My Heart" | Cătălin Dascălu, Theea Miculescu |
| Georgy | "Tears" | Valentin Muntean, Claire Avakian |
| Johnny Bădulescu | "Give Up Now" | Rob Price |
| Laura Bretan | "Dear Father" | Mihai Alexandru, Alexandra Niculae |
| Letiția Moisescu and Sensibil Balkan | "Daina" | Mihai Ogășanu, Marian Enache, Roni-Cristiana Cazacu |
| Linda Teodosiu | "Renegades" | Jonas Thander, Rachel Suter, Frank Giustra |
| Nicola | "Weight of the World" | Michael James Down, Will Taylor, Jonas Gladnikoff |
| Olivier Kaye | "Right Now" | Ovidiu Jacobsen, Shani Kfir, Rasmus Bosse |
| Ommieh and Anakrisez | "Rock This Way" | Eduard Cârcotă, Alexandru Bugan |
| Steam | "The Way It Goes" | Sorin Cotorceanu, Mihai Iulian Rapeanu |
| Teodora Dinu | "Skyscraper" | Udo Mechels, Laila Samuelsen, Jonas Brøgger Filtenborg |
| Trooper | "Destin" | Aurelian Dincă |
| TMW | "Make Me Your Man" | Adi Campurean, Adrian-Radu Rusu, Eduard Cârcotă |
| Vaida | "Underground" | Hanif Sabzevari, Michael James Down, Will Taylor, Tonje Gjevjon |
| Xonia | "Discrete" | Leticia Ascencio, John Scott Mulchaey, Edliberto Mendez, Bexx |

==== Semi-finals ====
The two semi-finals took place on 27 January and 10 February 2019. The first semi-final was held at the Sala Polivalentă in Iași, while the second semi-final was held at the Sala Sporturilor "Victoria" in Arad. In each semi-final eleven or twelve songs competed and six qualified to the final. A jury panel first selected five songs to advance. The remaining entries then faced a public televote which determined an additional qualifier. The members of the jury panel that voted during the semi-finals were: Adi Cristescu (singer, composer), Mihai Georgescu (singer-songwriter), Crina Mardare (vocal coach), Andy Platon (composer, producer, DJ) and Mugurel Vrabete (musician).

In addition to the performances of the competing entries, the interval act in the first semi-final featured a performance from Iuliana Beregoi, while the interval act in the second semi-final featured performances from Alessandro Canino and the band Hit Italy.

Jury qualifier Public vote qualifier

Semi-final 1 (First round) – 27 January 2019
| R/O | Artist | Song | Points | Place |
|---|---|---|---|---|
| 1 | Trooper | "Destin" | 36 | 4 |
| 2 | Berniceya | "The Call: Dynasty of Love" | 8 | 9 |
| 3 | Ommieh and Anakrisez | "Rock This Way" | 23 | 8 |
| 4 | Teodora Dinu | "Skyscraper" | 27 | 5 |
| 5 | Dya and Lucian Colareza | "Without You (Sin ti)" | 37 | 3 |
| 6 | Nicola | "Weight of the World" | 27 | 6 |
| 7 | Steam | "The Way It Goes" | 6 | 10 |
| 8 | Vaida | "Underground" | 26 | 7 |
| 9 | Claudiu Mirea | "We Are the Ones" | 48 | 1 |
| 10 | The Four | "Song of My Heart" | 5 | 11 |
| 11 | Bella Santiago | "Army of Love" | 47 | 2 |

Semi-final 1 (Second round) – 27 January 2019
| Artist | Song | Televote | Place |
|---|---|---|---|
| Berniceya | "The Call: Dynasty of Love" | 104 | 6 |
| The Four | "Song of My Heart" | 661 | 2 |
| Nicola | "Weight of the World" | 255 | 5 |
| Ommieh and Anakrisez | "Rock This Way" | 262 | 4 |
| Steam | "The Way It Goes" | 394 | 3 |
| Vaida | "Underground" | 1,825 | 1 |

Semi-final 2 (First round) – 10 February 2019
| R/O | Artist | Song | Points | Place |
|---|---|---|---|---|
| 1 | 2 Gents | "Ielele" | 18 | 7 |
| 2 | Georgy | "Tears" | 5 | 10 |
| 3 | Olivier Kaye | "Right Now" | 30 | 5 |
| 4 | Xonia | "Discrete" | 14 | 9 |
| 5 | TMW | "Make Me Your Man" | 1 | 12 |
| 6 | Johnny Bădulescu | "Give Up Now" | 16 | 8 |
| 7 | Echoes | "High Heels On" | 3 | 11 |
| 8 | Aldo Blaga | "Your Journey" | 19 | 6 |
| 9 | Letiția Moisescu and Sensibil Balkan | "Daina" | 37 | 4 |
| 10 | Laura Bretan | "Dear Father" | 54 | 1 |
| 11 | Ester Peony | "On a Sunday" | 41 | 3 |
| 12 | Linda Teodosiu | "Renegades" | 52 | 2 |

Semi-final 2 (Second round) – 10 February 2019
| Artist | Song | Televote | Place |
|---|---|---|---|
| 2 Gents | "Ielele" | 295 | 2 |
| Aldo Blaga | "Your Journey" | 539 | 1 |
| Echoes | "High Heels On" | 141 | 7 |
| Johnny Bădulescu | "Give Up Now" | 142 | 6 |
| Georgy | "Tears" | 191 | 4 |
| TMW | "Make Me Your Man" | 254 | 3 |
| Xonia | "Discrete" | 154 | 5 |

==== Final ====
The final took place on 17 February 2019 at the Sala Polivalentă in Bucharest. Twelve songs competed and the winner, "On a Sunday" performed by Ester Peony, was determined by the combination of the votes from a six-member international jury panel (6/7) and public televoting (1/7). The members of the jury panel that voted during the final were: William Lee Adams (American journalist, Wiwibloggs editor), Deban Aderemi (British composer, vlogger, Wiwibloggs editor), Alex Calancea (Moldovan artist, producer, composer), Șerban Cazan (Romanian producer), Tali Eshkoli (Israeli entrepreneur, show producer, content editor) and Emmelie de Forest (Danish singer, Eurovision Song Contest 2013 winner). In addition to the performances of the competing entries, the interval acts featured performances by Emmelie de Forest performing the songs "Sanctuary" and "Only Teardrops", Eurovision Song Contest 2018 winner Netta Barzilai performing the songs "Toy" and "Bassa Sababa", as well as Golden Stag Festival 2018 winner Inis Neziri performing the songs "Piedestal" and "Man's World".

Final – 17 February 2019
| R/O | Artist | Song | Jury | Televote | | Total | Place |
| R/O | Artist | Song | Jury | Votes | Points | Total | Place |
|---|---|---|---|---|---|---|---|
| 1 | Linda Teodosiu | "Renegades" | 36 | 771 | 6 | 42 | 4 |
| 2 | Olivier Kaye | "Right Now" | 26 | 151 | 1 | 27 | 8 |
| 3 | Laura Bretan | "Dear Father" | 48 | 4,685 | 12 | 60 | 2 |
| 4 | Teodora Dinu | "Skyscraper" | 7 | 139 | 0 | 7 | 12 |
| 5 | Claudiu Mirea | "We Are the Ones" | 19 | 134 | 0 | 19 | 9 |
| 6 | Aldo Blaga | "Your Journey" | 10 | 455 | 4 | 14 | 10 |
| 7 | Ester Peony | "On a Sunday" | 62 | 356 | 3 | 65 | 1 |
| 8 | Letiția Moisescu and Sensibil Balkan | "Daina" | 35 | 572 | 5 | 40 | 5 |
| 9 | Bella Santiago | "Army of Love" | 50 | 1,161 | 8 | 58 | 3 |
| 10 | Trooper | "Destin" | 19 | 1,425 | 10 | 29 | 7 |
| 11 | Dya and Lucian Colareza | "Without You (Sin ti)" | 8 | 332 | 2 | 10 | 11 |
| 12 | Vaida | "Underground" | 28 | 988 | 7 | 35 | 6 |

Detailed Jury Votes
| R/O | Song | W.L. Adams | D. Aderemi | A. Calancea | Ș. Cazan | T. Eshkoli | E. de Forest | Total |
|---|---|---|---|---|---|---|---|---|
| 1 | "Renegades" | 2 | 6 | 8 | 8 | 6 | 6 | 36 |
| 2 | "Right Now" | | 2 | 6 | 5 | 5 | 8 | 26 |
| 3 | "Dear Father" | 6 | 4 | 12 | 7 | 7 | 12 | 48 |
| 4 | "Skyscraper" | | 5 | | | 2 | | 7 |
| 5 | "We Are the Ones" | 1 | 3 | 4 | 4 | 3 | 4 | 19 |
| 6 | "Your Journey" | 3 | | 1 | 1 | | 5 | 10 |
| 7 | "On a Sunday" | 12 | 12 | 7 | 12 | 12 | 7 | 62 |
| 8 | "Daina" | 8 | 7 | 3 | 6 | 8 | 3 | 35 |
| 9 | "Army of Love" | 10 | 10 | 10 | 10 | 10 | | 50 |
| 10 | "Destin" | 5 | | 5 | 3 | 4 | 2 | 19 |
| 11 | "Without You (Sin ti)" | 4 | 1 | | 2 | | 1 | 8 |
| 12 | "Underground" | 7 | 8 | 2 | | 1 | 10 | 28 |

=== Promotion ===
Ester Peony made several appearances across Europe to specifically promote "On a Sunday" as the Romanian Eurovision entry. On 6 April, Ester Peony performed during the Eurovision in Concert event which was held at the AFAS Live venue in Amsterdam, Netherlands and hosted by Cornald Maas and Marlayne. On 21 April, Ester Peony performed during the Eurovision Pre-Party Madrid event which was held at the Sala La Riviera venue in Madrid, Spain and hosted by Tony Aguilar and Julia Varela.

== At Eurovision ==
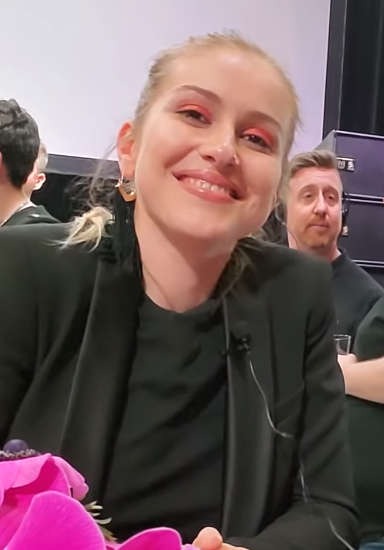
Ester Peony at the Eurovision Song Contest 2019

According to Eurovision rules, all nations with the exceptions of the host country and the "Big Five" (France, Germany, Italy, Spain and the United Kingdom) are required to qualify from one of two semi-finals in order to compete for the final; the top ten countries from each semi-final progress to the final. The European Broadcasting Union (EBU) split up the competing countries into six different pots based on voting patterns from previous contests, with countries with favourable voting histories put into the same pot. On 28 January 2019, an allocation draw was held which placed each country into one of the two semi-finals, as well as which half of the show they would perform in. Romania was placed into the second semi-final, to be held on 16 May 2019, and was scheduled to perform in the first half of the show.

Once all the competing songs for the 2019 contest had been released, the running order for the semi-finals was decided by the shows' producers rather than through another draw, so that similar songs were not placed next to each other. Romania was set to perform in position 6, following the entry from Latvia and before the entry from Denmark.

All three shows were broadcast in Romania on TVR 1, TVRi and TVR HD with commentary by Liana Stanciu and Bogdan Stănescu. The Romanian spokesperson, who announced the top 12-point score awarded by the Romanian jury during the final, was Ilinca who previously represented Romania in 2017.

=== Semi-final ===
Ester Peony took part in technical rehearsals on 2 and 5 May, followed by dress rehearsals on 10 and 11 May. This included the jury show on 10 May where the professional juries of each country watched and voted on the competing entries.

The stage show featured Ester Peony wearing a glittery black dress and accompanied by two dancers in the centre stage representing two spirits (water and fire) imprisoned in a haunted house, two backing vocalists on the left bridge of the stage representing ghosts held captive in the house for several generations, and a guitarist on the right bridge of the stage. The performance began with Peony sitting down on a red armchair in front of the background LED screens which displayed various dark backgrounds with pyrotechnic flame effects appearing from the ground. A pyrotechnic waterfall effect was also featured at the end of the performance with the screens displaying blasts of fire and large pink roses. The dancers that joined Ester Peony on stage were Valentin Cristian Chiș and Vlad Mircea, the backing vocalists were Adela-Daniela Baranci and Antonia Elena Liță, while the guitarist was the co-composer of "On a Sunday" Alexandru Șerbu.

At the end of the show, Romania was not announced among the top 10 entries in the second semi-final and therefore failed to qualify to compete in the final. It was later revealed that Romania placed thirteenth in the semi-final, receiving a total of 71 points: 24 points from the televoting and 47 points from the juries.

=== Voting ===
Voting during the three shows involved each country awarding two sets of points from 1-8, 10 and 12: one from their professional jury and the other from televoting. Each nation's jury consisted of five music industry professionals who are citizens of the country they represent, with their names published before the contest to ensure transparency. This jury judged each entry based on: vocal capacity; the stage performance; the song's composition and originality; and the overall impression by the act. In addition, no member of a national jury was permitted to be related in any way to any of the competing acts in such a way that they cannot vote impartially and independently. The individual rankings of each jury member as well as the nation's televoting results were released shortly after the grand final.

Below is a breakdown of points awarded to Romania and awarded by Romania in the second semi-final and grand final of the contest, and the breakdown of the jury voting and televoting conducted during the two shows:

==== Points awarded to Romania ====
Points awarded to Romania (Semi-final 2)
| Score | Televote | Jury |
|---|---|---|
| 12 points | Moldova | Moldova; Russia |
| 10 points | Italy | |
| 8 points | | Azerbaijan |
| 7 points | | |
| 6 points | | |
| 5 points | | United Kingdom |
| 4 points | | Germany |
| 3 points | | |
| 2 points | | Armenia; Italy |
| 1 point | Ireland; United Kingdom | Malta; North Macedonia |

==== Points awarded by Romania ====
Points awarded by Romania (Semi-final 2)
| Score | Televote | Jury |
|---|---|---|
| 12 points | Moldova | Moldova |
| 10 points | Azerbaijan | North Macedonia |
| 8 points | Russia | Netherlands |
| 7 points | Switzerland | Azerbaijan |
| 6 points | Netherlands | Russia |
| 5 points | Norway | Malta |
| 4 points | North Macedonia | Sweden |
| 3 points | Albania | Switzerland |
| 2 points | Malta | Albania |
| 1 point | Sweden | Austria |

Points awarded by Romania (Final)
| Score | Televote | Jury |
|---|---|---|
| 12 points | Netherlands | Australia |
| 10 points | Switzerland | Azerbaijan |
| 8 points | Italy | Czech Republic |
| 7 points | Russia | North Macedonia |
| 6 points | Azerbaijan | Russia |
| 5 points | Iceland | Netherlands |
| 4 points | Norway | Switzerland |
| 3 points | Israel | Serbia |
| 2 points | Australia | Albania |
| 1 point | France | Sweden |

==== Detailed voting results ====
The following members comprised the Romanian jury:

- Liana Stanciu (jury chairperson) – presenter
- Ozana Barabancea – artist, singer
- Monica Anghel – artist, singer, represented Romania in the 2002 contest
- Andrei Kerestely – producer, composer
- Bogdan Pavlică – music journalist

Detailed voting results from Romania (Semi-final 2)
| R/O | Country | Jury | | | | | | | Televote | |
| R/O | Country | O. Barabancea | L. Stanciu | M. Anghel | A. Kerestely | B. Pavlică | Rank | Points | Rank | Points |
|---|---|---|---|---|---|---|---|---|---|---|
| 01 | Armenia | 17 | 8 | 11 | 9 | 12 | 13 | | 14 | |
| 02 | Ireland | 16 | 12 | 9 | 17 | 15 | 16 | | 16 | |
| 03 | Moldova | 2 | 1 | 2 | 5 | 6 | 1 | 12 | 1 | 12 |
| 04 | Switzerland | 15 | 5 | 12 | 7 | 7 | 8 | 3 | 4 | 7 |
| 05 | Latvia | 14 | 14 | 13 | 15 | 9 | 15 | | 15 | |
| 06 | Romania | | | | | | | | | |
| 07 | Denmark | 13 | 16 | 14 | 16 | 16 | 17 | | 13 | |
| 08 | Sweden | 12 | 6 | 15 | 13 | 3 | 7 | 4 | 10 | 1 |
| 09 | Austria | 3 | 15 | 16 | 8 | 13 | 10 | 1 | 17 | |
| 10 | Croatia | 11 | 9 | 8 | 14 | 11 | 12 | | 11 | |
| 11 | Malta | 10 | 7 | 10 | 4 | 5 | 6 | 5 | 9 | 2 |
| 12 | Lithuania | 9 | 13 | 7 | 10 | 10 | 11 | | 12 | |
| 13 | Russia | 4 | 3 | 3 | 12 | 4 | 5 | 6 | 3 | 8 |
| 14 | Albania | 5 | 11 | 6 | 11 | 14 | 9 | 2 | 8 | 3 |
| 15 | Norway | 8 | 17 | 17 | 6 | 17 | 14 | | 6 | 5 |
| 16 | Netherlands | 7 | 2 | 5 | 2 | 2 | 3 | 8 | 5 | 6 |
| 17 | North Macedonia | 1 | 10 | 1 | 1 | 8 | 2 | 10 | 7 | 4 |
| 18 | Azerbaijan | 6 | 4 | 4 | 3 | 1 | 4 | 7 | 2 | 10 |

Detailed voting results from Romania (Final)
| R/O | Country | Jury | | | | | | | Televote | |
| R/O | Country | O. Barabancea | L. Stanciu | M. Anghel | A. Kerestely | B. Pavlică | Rank | Points | Rank | Points |
|---|---|---|---|---|---|---|---|---|---|---|
| 01 | Malta | 12 | 10 | 10 | 11 | 9 | 11 | | 22 | |
| 02 | Albania | 4 | 8 | 8 | 16 | 10 | 9 | 2 | 21 | |
| 03 | Czech Republic | 2 | 7 | 7 | 7 | 2 | 3 | 8 | 20 | |
| 04 | Germany | 22 | 18 | 11 | 20 | 20 | 20 | | 23 | |
| 05 | Russia | 13 | 4 | 2 | 9 | 5 | 5 | 6 | 4 | 7 |
| 06 | Denmark | 14 | 17 | 12 | 21 | 17 | 17 | | 13 | |
| 07 | San Marino | 23 | 25 | 25 | 26 | 25 | 26 | | 26 | |
| 08 | North Macedonia | 6 | 21 | 1 | 1 | 16 | 4 | 7 | 17 | |
| 09 | Sweden | 16 | 6 | 13 | 6 | 6 | 10 | 1 | 14 | |
| 10 | Slovenia | 9 | 26 | 16 | 23 | 22 | 18 | | 19 | |
| 11 | Cyprus | 10 | 9 | 17 | 19 | 8 | 13 | | 18 | |
| 12 | Netherlands | 11 | 3 | 18 | 5 | 4 | 6 | 5 | 1 | 12 |
| 13 | Greece | 24 | 11 | 19 | 17 | 24 | 21 | | 15 | |
| 14 | Israel | 7 | 13 | 9 | 12 | 26 | 12 | | 8 | 3 |
| 15 | Norway | 17 | 16 | 20 | 4 | 19 | 14 | | 7 | 4 |
| 16 | United Kingdom | 20 | 23 | 21 | 18 | 21 | 25 | | 25 | |
| 17 | Iceland | 25 | 24 | 26 | 25 | 14 | 24 | | 6 | 5 |
| 18 | Estonia | 15 | 20 | 14 | 14 | 18 | 19 | | 16 | |
| 19 | Belarus | 18 | 19 | 15 | 22 | 15 | 22 | | 24 | |
| 20 | Azerbaijan | 3 | 1 | 6 | 3 | 1 | 2 | 10 | 5 | 6 |
| 21 | France | 26 | 22 | 24 | 13 | 7 | 15 | | 10 | 1 |
| 22 | Italy | 19 | 12 | 22 | 15 | 11 | 16 | | 3 | 8 |
| 23 | Serbia | 5 | 15 | 4 | 8 | 13 | 8 | 3 | 11 | |
| 24 | Switzerland | 8 | 5 | 5 | 10 | 12 | 7 | 4 | 2 | 10 |
| 25 | Australia | 1 | 2 | 3 | 2 | 3 | 1 | 12 | 9 | 2 |
| 26 | Spain | 21 | 14 | 23 | 24 | 23 | 23 | | 12 | |
