= Moldova in the Eurovision Song Contest 2018 =

- Eurovision Song Contest 2018
- Participating broadcaster: TeleRadio-Moldova (TRM)
- Country: Moldova
- Selection process: O melodie pentru Europa 2018
- Selection date: 24 February 2018

Competing entry
- Song: "My Lucky Day"
- Artist: DoReDoS
- Songwriters: Philipp Kirkorov; John Ballard

Placement
- Semi-final result: Qualified (3rd, 235 points)
- Final result: 10th, 209 points

Participation chronology

Moldova was represented at the Eurovision Song Contest 2018 with the song "My Lucky Day" written by Philipp Kirkorov and John Ballard. The song was performed by the group DoReDoS. Songwriter Philipp Kirkorov represented Russia in the Eurovision Song Contest 1995 with the song "Kolybelnaya dlya vulkana" where he placed seventeenth. The Moldovan broadcaster TeleRadio-Moldova (TRM) organised the national final O melodie pentru Europa 2018 in order to select the Moldovan entry for the 2018 contest in Lisbon, Portugal. 27 entries competed to represent Moldova in Lisbon, with 16 being shortlisted to participate in the televised national final which took place on 24 February 2018 after auditioning in front of a jury panel. "My Lucky Day" performed by DoReDoS emerged as the winner after gaining the most points following the combination of votes from a jury panel and a public televote.

Moldova was drawn to compete in the second semi-final of the Eurovision Song Contest which took place on 10 May 2018. Performing during the show in position 7, "My Lucky Day" was announced among the top 10 entries of the second semi-final and therefore qualified to compete in the final on 14 May. It was later revealed that Moldova placed third out of the 18 participating countries in the semi-final with 235 points. In the final, Moldova performed in position 19 and placed tenth out of the 26 participating countries, scoring 209 points.

== Background ==
Prior to the 2018 Contest, Moldova had participated in the Eurovision Song Contest thirteen times since its first entry in 2005. The nation's best placing in the contest was third, which it achieved in 2017 with the song "Hey, Mamma!" performed by SunStroke Project. To this point, Moldova have achieved another two top ten placings at the contest: in 2005 where "Boonika bate toba" performed by Zdob și Zdub placed sixth, and in 2007 where "Fight" performed by Natalia Barbu placed tenth.

The Moldovan national broadcaster, TeleRadio-Moldova (TRM), broadcast the event within Moldova and organised the selection process for the nation's entry. TRM confirmed their intentions to participate at the 2018 Eurovision Song Contest on 8 November 2017. Moldova has selected their entry via a national selection show since 2008, a procedure that was continued for their 2019 participation.

== Before Eurovision ==
=== O melodie pentru Europa 2018 ===
O melodie pentru Europa 2018 was the national final format developed by TRM in order to select Moldova's entry for the Eurovision Song Contest 2018. The event took place at the TRM Studio 2 in Chișinău, hosted by Sergiu Beznițchi and Evelina Vîrlan with Djulieta Gînu-Ardovan reporting from the green room, and included a final to be held on 24 February 2018. The show was broadcast on Moldova 1, Radio Moldova Actualități, Radio Moldova Tineret and Radio Moldova Muzical as well as online via the broadcaster's official website trm.md.

==== Competing entries ====
Artists and composers had the opportunity to submit their entries between 1 December 2017 and 15 January 2018. Artists could submit more than one song, and an international act was able to compete only if they were part of a duo or group where 50% of the lead vocalists were of Moldovan nationality. At the conclusion of the submission deadline, 27 valid entries out of 28 were received by the broadcaster; "Let's Start Together Right Now" performed by Pelageya Stefoglo was disqualified as the song had also been submitted for the 2018 Belarusian Eurovision national final. The live audition round took place on 1 February 2018 at the Karaoke Concert Hall Atrium in Chișinău where 16 finalists were selected to advance. The auditions were broadcast online via trm.md and via TRM's Facebook and YouTube pages. The jury panel that evaluated the songs during the live auditions and selected the 16 finalists consisted of Nelly Ciobanu (singer, 2009 Moldovan Eurovision entrant), Anatol Chiriac (composer), Alexandru Gorgos (composer), Valeria Barbas (singer and composer) and Victoria Cușnir (journalist).

Artist	Song	Songwriters(s)
Anna Odobescu	"Agony"	Valeriu Pașa
Anna Timofei	"Endlessly"	Ylva Persson, Linda Persson, Niklas Bergqvist, Simon Johansson, Georgios Kalpakidis
BellaLuna	"Moments"	Mitya Effterman, Maxim Safrin
Che-MD	"Inima-n stîngă"	Michael Smolenko
Constantin Cobîlean	"Numai tu"	Constantin Cobîlean
Doinița Gherman	"Dance in Flames"	Ylva Persson, Linda Persson, Niklas Bergqvist, Simon Johansson
DoReDoS	"My Lucky Day"	Philipp Kirkorov, John Ballard
Felicia Dunaf	"Alien"	Primož Poglajen, Will Taylor, Michael James Down
Ilia Sorocean and Dasha DaGro	"Minds & Veins"	Ilia Sorocean
Lavinia Rusu	"Altundeva"	Alkemics Sound, Eugeniu Doibani
Nicoleta Sava	"La esencia del sur"	Rafael Artesero, Jose Juan Santana, Viorica Atanasov
Ruslan Tsar	"Come to Life"	Ruslan Țăranu
Sandy C and Aaron Sibley	"Once Upon a Time"	Aaron Sibley
Tolik	"Broken Glass"	Leah Muscat, Malin Johansson, Rickard Bonde Truumeel
Vera Țurcanu	"Black Heart"	David Gällring, Karl Sahlin, Vera Țurcanu, Nikos Sofis
Viorela	"The Gates of Love"	Viorela Moraru

==== Final ====
The final took place on 24 February 2018. Sixteen songs competed and the winner was selected based on the combination of a public televote and the votes of an expert jury. The jury that voted in the final included Anatol Chiriac (composer), Pavel Gamurari (lecturer and member of the Union of Composers and Musicologists in Moldova), Nicu Țărnă (singer), Victoria Cușnir (journalist), Sandu Gorgos (composer), Ivan Aculov (singer-songwriter), Liviu Știrbu (composer), Lilia Șolomei (soloist at the National Opera and Ballet Theater) and Andrei Tostogan (singer, composer and producer). In addition to the performances of the competing entries, 2010 and 2017 Moldovan Eurovision entrant SunStroke Project performed as a guest. "My Lucky Day" performed by DoReDoS was selected as the winner.

Final – 24 February 2018
R/O	Artist	Song	Jury		Televote		Total	Place
R/O	Artist	Song	Votes	Points	Votes	Points	Total	Place
1	Tolik	"Broken Glass"	30	3	385	10	13	4
2	Lavinia Rusu	"Altundeva"	30	4	59	2	6	10
3	Bella Luna	"Moments"	14	0	34	0	0	13
4	Anna Timofei	"Endlessly"	28	2	39	0	2	11
5	Ilia Sorocean and Dasha DaGro	"Minds & Veins"	25	1	54	0	1	12
6	Che-MD	"Inima-n stîngă"	3	0	26	0	0	16
7	Constantin Cobîlean	"Numai tu"	8	0	134	7	7	9
8	DoReDoS	"My Lucky Day"	104	12	3,813	12	24	1
9	Sandy C and Aaron Sibley	"Once Upon a Time"	36	5	113	4	9	6
10	Anna Odobescu	"Agony"	54	8	62	3	11	5
11	Nicoleta Sava	"La esencia del sur"	16	0	171	8	8	7
12	Doinița Gherman and One Voice	"Dance in Flames"	52	7	134	6	13	3
13	Felicia Dunaf	"Alien"	40	6	56	1	7	8
14	Viorela	"The Gates of Love"	5	0	25	0	0	15
15	Vera Țurcanu	"Black Heart"	69	10	123	5	15	2
16	Ruslan Tsar	"Come to Life"	8	0	32	0	0	14

Detailed Jury Votes
R/O	Song	A. Chiriac	P. Gamurari	N. Țărnă	V. Cușnir	S. Gorgos	I. Aculov	L. Solomei	L. Știrbu	A. Tostogan	Total
1	"Broken Glass"		5	6	6	4	4			5	30
2	"Altundeva"	6		5	8	6	1			4	30
3	"Moments"		4	2					8		14
4	"Endlessly"		7	3	1			5	10	2	28
5	"Minds & Veins"	1		7	7	2		7	1		25
6	"Inima-n stîngă"				3						3
7	"Numai tu"						2	1	4	1	8
8	"My Lucky Day"	12	12	12	12	12	12	12	12	8	104
9	"Once Upon a Time"		1	4	5	1	7	3	3	12	36
10	"Agony"	7	10	8	4	5	6	6	5	3	54
11	"Esencia del Sur"	2	8			3	3				16
12	"Dance in Flames"	8	6			7	8	10	7	6	52
13	"Alien"	10	3	1	2	8	5	4		7	40
14	"The Gates of Love"	5									5
15	"Black Heart"	3	2	10	10	10	10	8	6	10	69
16	"Come to Life"	4						2	2		8

=== Promotion ===
DoReDoS made several appearances across Europe to specifically promote "My Lucky Day" as the Moldovan Eurovision entry. On 5 March, DoReDoS performed the Moldovan entry as a guest during the final of the Romanian Eurovision national final. On 24 March, DoReDoS performed during the Eurovision PreParty Riga, which was organised by OGAE Latvia and held at the Crystal Club Concert Hall in Riga. On 7 April, DoReDoS performed during the Eurovision Pre-Party, which was held at the VEGAS Kuntsevo shopping mall in Moscow, Russia. Between 8 and 11 April, DoReDoS took part in promotional activities in Tel Aviv, Israel and performed during the Israel Calling event held at the Rabin Square. On 14 April, DoReDoS performed during the Eurovision in Concert event which was held at the AFAS Live venue in Amsterdam, Netherlands and hosted by Edsilia Rombley and Cornald Maas. On 21 April, DoReDoS performed during the ESPreParty event on 21 April which was held at the Sala La Riviera venue in Madrid, Spain and hosted by Soraya Arnelas.

== At Eurovision ==
According to Eurovision rules, all nations with the exceptions of the host country and the "Big Five" (France, Germany, Italy, Spain and the United Kingdom) are required to qualify from one of two semi-finals in order to compete for the final; the top ten countries from each semi-final progress to the final. The European Broadcasting Union (EBU) split up the competing countries into six different pots based on voting patterns from previous contests, with countries with favourable voting histories put into the same pot. On 29 January 2018, a special allocation draw was held which placed each country into one of the two semi-finals, as well as which half of the show they would perform in. Moldova was placed into the second semi-final, to be held on 10 May 2018, and was scheduled to perform in the first half of the show.

Once all the competing songs for the 2018 contest had been released, the running order for the semi-finals was decided by the shows' producers rather than through another draw, so that similar songs were not placed next to each other. Moldova was set to perform in position 7, following the entry from Russia and preceding the entry from the Netherlands.

The two semi-finals and the final were televised in Moldova on Moldova 1 as well as broadcast via radio on Radio Moldova. The Moldovan spokesperson, who announced the top 12-point score awarded by the Moldovan jury during the final, was Djulieta Ardovan.

=== Semi-final ===
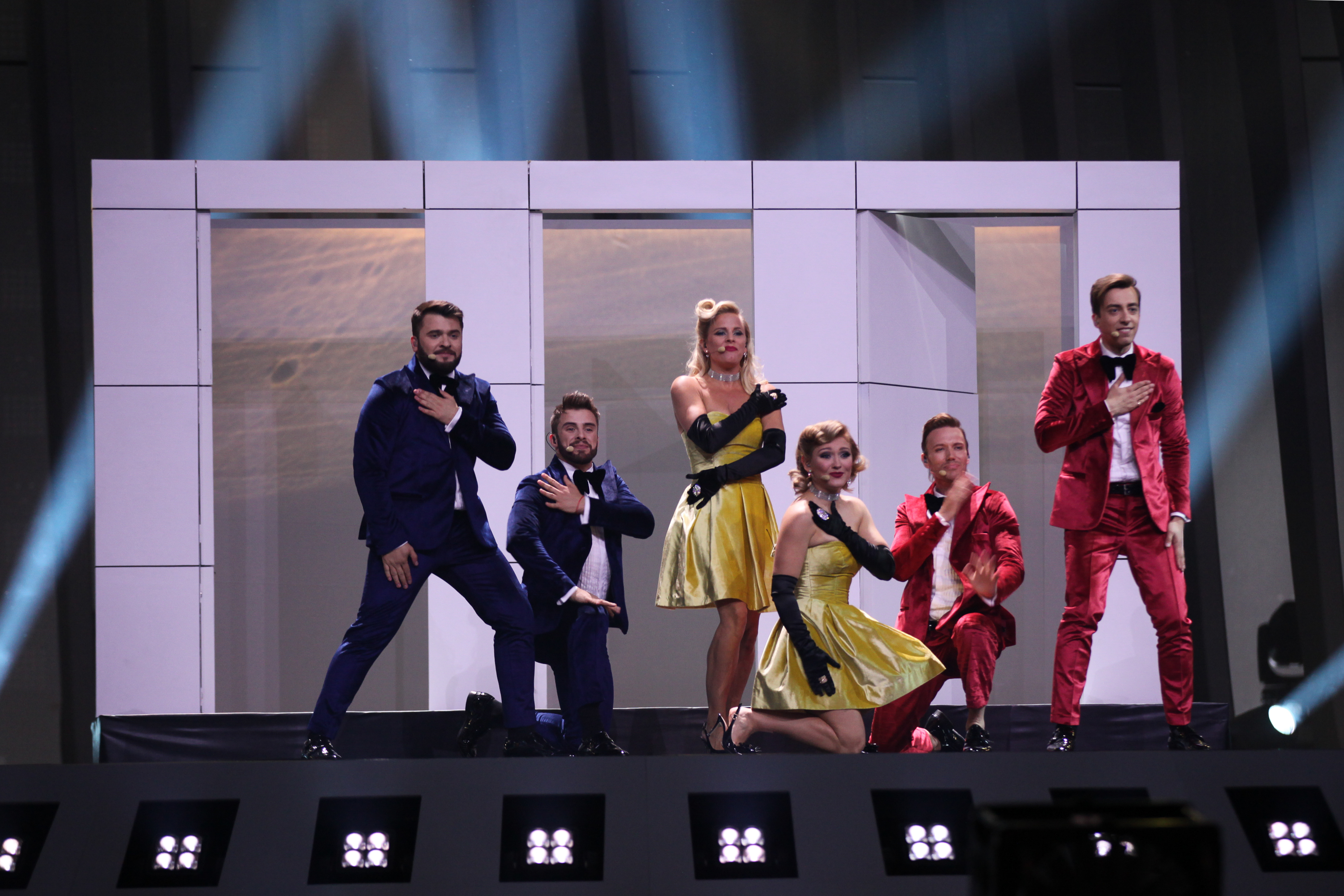
DoReDoS during a rehearsal before the second semi-final

DoReDoS took part in technical rehearsals on 1 and 5 May, followed by dress rehearsals on 9 and 10 May. This included the jury show on 9 May where the professional juries of each country watched and voted on the competing entries.

The Moldovan performance featured the members of DoReDoS dressed in the colours of the Moldovan flag performing on stage with three backing vocalists/dancers, all of them with the same outfits. Sergiu Mîța was dressed in a blue suit, while Marina Djundyet was dressed in a yellow dress and Eugeniu Andrianov in a red suit. The stage featured a white box with small doors that were opened and closed to reveal the arms, legs, and faces of the performers, of which Mîța and Djundyet walked around at the beginning. The performance was concluded with all group members getting out of the box and joined by the backing performers. In regards to the performance which was directed by Fokas Evangelinos, DoReDoS stated: "It's a song about the relationship between one woman and two men. The white structure is a house, and when the windows open you get to see a visual representation of what the singers at that moment are thinking." The backing performers that joined DoReDoS on stage are Erik Høiby, Kostya Vechersky and Sara Li.

At the end of the show, Moldova was announced as having finished in the top 10 and subsequently qualifying for the grand final. It was later revealed that Moldova placed third in the semi-final, receiving a total of 235 points, 153 points from the televoting and 82 points from the juries.

=== Final ===
Shortly after the second semi-final, a winners' press conference was held for the ten qualifying countries. As part of this press conference, the qualifying artists took part in a draw to determine which half of the grand final they would subsequently participate in. This draw was done in the order the countries were announced during the semi-final. Moldova was drawn to compete in the second half. Following this draw, the shows' producers decided upon the running order of the final, as they had done for the semi-finals. Moldova was subsequently placed to perform in position 19, following the entry from Bulgaria and before the entry from Sweden.

DoReDoS once again took part in dress rehearsals on 11 and 12 May before the final, including the jury final where the professional juries cast their final votes before the live show. The group performed a repeat of their semi-final performance during the final on 12 May. Moldova placed tenth in the final, scoring 209 points: 115 points from the televoting and 94 points from the juries.

=== Voting ===
Voting during the three shows involved each country awarding two sets of points from 1-8, 10 and 12: one from their professional jury and the other from televoting. Each nation's jury consisted of five music industry professionals who are citizens of the country they represent, with their names published before the contest to ensure transparency. This jury judged each entry based on: vocal capacity; the stage performance; the song's composition and originality; and the overall impression by the act. In addition, no member of a national jury was permitted to be related in any way to any of the competing acts in such a way that they cannot vote impartially and independently. The individual rankings of each jury member as well as the nation's televoting results were released shortly after the grand final.

Below is a breakdown of points awarded to Moldova and awarded by Moldova in the second semi-final and grand final of the contest, and the breakdown of the jury voting and televoting conducted during the two shows:

==== Points awarded to Moldova ====
Points awarded to Moldova (Semi-final 2)
Score	Televote	Jury
12 points	France; Georgia; Romania; Russia; Ukraine	Romania; Russia
10 points	Australia; Hungary; Italy	Australia; San Marino
8 points	Latvia	
7 points	Netherlands	
6 points	Denmark; San Marino; Slovenia	Latvia
5 points	Germany; Norway; Serbia; Sweden	Montenegro; Slovenia
4 points	Malta; Montenegro	Germany; Italy; Malta
3 points		Georgia; Netherlands
2 points	Poland	Denmark; Sweden
1 point		

Points awarded to Moldova (Final)
Score	Televote	Jury
12 points	Romania; Russia	Russia
10 points	Israel; Italy	Armenia; Cyprus; Greece
8 points	Bulgaria	Croatia; Montenegro
7 points	Latvia	Azerbaijan; Romania; San Marino
6 points	Belarus; Czech Republic; France; Portugal; Ukraine	Slovenia
5 points	Australia	Serbia
4 points	Azerbaijan; United Kingdom	
3 points	Georgia	
2 points	Hungary; San Marino	Albania; Australia
1 point	Armenia; Estonia; Greece; Ireland; Macedonia; Serbia	

==== Points awarded by Moldova ====
Points awarded by Moldova (Semi-final 2)
Score	Televote	Jury
12 points	Romania	Romania
10 points	Serbia	Australia
8 points	Russia	Ukraine
7 points	Ukraine	Russia
6 points	Norway	Slovenia
5 points	Australia	Netherlands
4 points	Denmark	Norway
3 points	Netherlands	Latvia
2 points	Sweden	Malta
1 point	Hungary	Denmark

Points awarded by Moldova (Final)
Score	Televote	Jury
12 points	Israel	Estonia
10 points	Ukraine	Israel
8 points	Italy	Bulgaria
7 points	Cyprus	Australia
6 points	Czech Republic	Cyprus
5 points	Norway	Ukraine
4 points	Germany	Germany
3 points	Bulgaria	Austria
2 points	Hungary	Norway
1 point	Estonia	Netherlands

==== Detailed voting results ====
The following members comprised the Moldovan jury:

- Anatol Chiriac (jury chairperson) – composer
- Cristina Scarlat – singer, composer, represented Moldova in the 2014 contest
- Vera Țurcanu – singer, actress
- Vitalie Catană – singer, producer, composer
- Rodica Aculova – singer

Detailed voting results from Moldova (Semi-final 2)
R/O	Country	Jury							Televote	
R/O	Country	A. Chiriac	C. Scarlat	V. Țurcanu	V. Catană	R. Aculova	Rank	Points	Rank	Points
01	Norway	9	5	4	5	9	7	4	5	6
02	Romania	1	1	5	3	1	1	12	1	12
03	Serbia	15	6	13	13	10	13		2	10
04	San Marino	12	12	17	17	17	17		17	
05	Denmark	6	9	8	16	12	10	1	7	4
06	Russia	2	4	16	7	2	4	7	3	8
07	Moldova									
08	Netherlands	5	2	6	12	6	6	5	8	3
09	Australia	4	3	9	2	5	2	10	6	5
10	Georgia	7	13	14	10	8	12		12	
11	Poland	11	14	12	15	16	16		16	
12	Malta	16	8	11	9	4	9	2	14	
13	Hungary	17	10	15	11	13	15		10	1
14	Latvia	8	15	2	4	14	8	3	13	
15	Sweden	14	16	7	6	11	11		9	2
16	Montenegro	13	17	10	14	7	14		15	
17	Slovenia	10	11	1	1	15	5	6	11	
18	Ukraine	3	7	3	8	3	3	8	4	7

Detailed voting results from Moldova (Final)
R/O	Country	Jury							Televote	
R/O	Country	A. Chiriac	C. Scarlat	V. Țurcanu	V. Catană	R. Aculova	Rank	Points	Rank	Points
01	Ukraine	5	3	8	11	8	6	5	2	10
02	Spain	17	19	6	10	16	14		20	
03	Slovenia	16	18	9	9	17	15		22	
04	Lithuania	18	10	13	7	14	13		17	
05	Austria	3	11	14	3	15	8	3	13	
06	Estonia	1	1	4	16	1	1	12	10	1
07	Norway	12	2	7	17	11	9	2	6	5
08	Portugal	19	24	18	18	18	24		24	
09	United Kingdom	20	12	24	20	12	21		23	
10	Serbia	21	15	11	12	10	16		14	
11	Germany	14	7	10	1	13	7	4	7	4
12	Albania	22	16	17	21	2	11		19	
13	France	8	17	16	19	19	18		11	
14	Czech Republic	4	23	15	8	21	12		5	6
15	Denmark	13	6	23	25	24	17		12	
16	Australia	2	8	5	5	6	4	7	18	
17	Finland	23	25	22	24	9	22		25	
18	Bulgaria	6	14	1	4	5	3	8	8	3
19	Moldova									
20	Sweden	15	13	19	13	22	20		15	
21	Hungary	25	20	25	22	25	25		9	2
22	Israel	24	4	3	2	3	2	10	1	12
23	Netherlands	7	5	12	15	7	10	1	16	
24	Ireland	9	22	21	14	20	19		21	
25	Cyprus	10	9	2	6	4	5	6	4	7
26	Italy	11	21	20	23	23	23		3	8
