= On a Sunday =

2019 song by Ester Peony

- Cover artwork for the original release.

Single by Ester Peony
- Released: 17 January 2019
- Genre: Electropop
- Length: 3:01
- Label: Independent
- Songwriter: Ioana Victoria Badea

Ester Peony singles chronology
"1000 de motive" (2016)	"On a Sunday" (2019)	"Dernière danse" (2019)

Music video
- "On a Sunday" on YouTube

Audio sample
- file; help

Eurovision Song Contest 2019 entry
- Country: Romania
- Artist: Ester Peony
- Language: English
- Composers: Ester Alexandra Crețu; Alexandru Șerbu
- Lyricist: Ioana Victoria Badea

Finals performance
- Semi-final result: 13th
- Semi-final points: 71

Entry chronology
- ◄ "Goodbye" (2018)
- "Alcohol You" (2020) ►

"On a Sunday" is a song recorded by Romanian singer Ester Peony. It was independently released for digital download and streaming as a single on 17 January 2019. Ioana Victoria Badea wrote the lyrics, while Peony composed the music alongside Alexandru Șerbu. Musically, the track is a mid-tempo blues, R&B, soul and 2000s-influenced electropop ballad backed by percussion, guitar, synthesizers and trance beats. Its lyrics discuss a failed relationship and include Peony reflecting upon a former love interest and the futile idea that he might return. Observers likened the track to the American folk song "The Wayfaring Stranger".

"On a Sunday" represented Romania in the Eurovision Song Contest 2019 in Tel Aviv, Israel, after winning the pre-selection show Selecția Națională. The country failed to qualify for the final, marking their second and consecutive year to achieve this result. During a large portion of Peony's acclaimed goth-inspired performance, Peony was singing from a red armchair while accompanying dancers enacted a battle between good and evil visually amplified by various dark graphics showed on the LED screens. The show was the first one in Romania's Eurovision participation history to be significantly invested in by the Romanian Television (TVR), with costs amounting to a reported 100,000 euros.

The track was met with mixed reviews from music critics upon its release, with some praising its production, contemporary nature and Peony's vocal delivery. To promote "On a Sunday", Peony performed the song on multiple radio and television stations in Romania, as well as on Eurovision-related occasions in the Netherlands and Spain. A well-received accompanying music video was uploaded to Cat Music's YouTube channel on 10 March 2019. Directed by Petre Năstase at Casa Monteoru in Bucharest, the video shows Peony wearing multiple outfits while investigating a haunted house.

== Background and composition ==
Ester Peony gained online recognition in 2014 for covering songs on YouTube, leading to a record deal with a Romanian label. She subsequently achieved success in Romania with her 2015 single "Sub aripa ta", which was playlisted by native radio and television stations. "On a Sunday" was independently released for digital download and streaming as a single on 17 January 2019. It was written by Ioana Victoria Badea, while the music was composed by Peony alongside Alexandru Șerbu. The idea for "On a Sunday" emerged from a guitar chord that inspired Peony to create a vocal melody. The song's title is only mentioned twice in its first verse, and it lyrically references the day in September that a "rupture occurred".

"On a Sunday" is a mid-tempo blues, R&B, soul and 2000s-influenced "dark" electropop ballad backed by percussion, "Western" guitar, "stuttering" synthesizers and "driving" trance beats. Critics also noted ethnic, jazz and gothic inspirations. The song's lyrics focus on a failed relationship, with Peony stating in an interview that "love becomes dangerous when given to the wrong person". Analyzing the lyrics, Diego Pinzon of Wiwibloggs called the track a "personal anecdote on the complexities of love". He further wrote: "[Peony] sings deftly about being obsessed with a former lover — and the idea, ultimately futile, that he might return. That longing, which can drive people into severe depression, often feels like the end of the world. Dealing with that pushes some people to the edge — and very clearly [...] Peony can be counted among them". Lyrics of "On a Sunday" include: "You left me [...] and I still remember that day in September/Watching the smoke rise from the ashtray, filling the room with pain, it’s still in my veins".

For the purpose of Peony's Eurovision Song Contest 2019 participation, "On a Sunday" was remastered, undergoing "structural changes [...] in [its] latter portions", leading to a "harsher beat in some parts". The singer elaborated: "The new version of the song comes with a slightly different, more dynamic feel. But at the same time it's keeping that dark mood". Lasting three minutes and four seconds, the remastered version of "On a Sunday" was eventually released for purchase on 10 March 2019 through Cat Music along with new cover artwork, replacing the previous version of the song. The label also released a CD in Romania.

== Critical reception and plagiarism accusation ==
"On a Sunday" was received with mixed reviews from music critics. Julian Geiser of Wiwibloggs wrote that the song had "a sultry, standout quality", while Pinzon of the same publication labelled it as "thoroughly contemporary" with a "universal appeal". In a Wiwibloggs review containing several reviews from individual critics, praise was outspoken towards Peony's voice and the song's catchiness and instrumentation, while one criticized it as "flat". Overall, the reviewers of the website gave the song 7.04 out of 10 points. Jonathan Currinn, writing for CelebMix, praised Peony's emotional and "classy" vocal delivery, but found the track to be "somewhat disappointing lyrically and rhythmically".

Due to accusations of plagiarising the American folk song "The Wayfaring Stranger", the Romanian Television (TVR) decided to set up a commission to analyze "On a Sunday" in February 2019. It consisted of music professionals Dan Dediu, Andrei Kerestely, Cristian Faur, Laurențiu Oprea and Gabriel Scîrlet. The broadcaster conclusively reported: "Although there are some similarities [...], it is a musical phrase of minor importance, which is not the essence of 'On a Sunday'. [...] In conclusion, [the song], even if it has some influences, can not be considered a plagiarism".

== Music video and promotion ==
A shot from the music video, showing Peony performing alongside two clones of herself in a haunted house.

By late February 2019, filming for an accompanying music video for "On a Sunday" had been completed, conducted by director Petre Năstase at Casa Monteoru in Bucharest, Romania. The clip was uploaded to Cat Music's official YouTube channel on 10 March 2019 and shows Peony "imprisoned in a deserted house". It begins with shots of an "old abandoned" mansion at night, which the singer is seen entering. The inside of the house is then shown, where a husky lies on a couch. Throughout the music video, Peony performs to the song wearing different outfits. Among other activities, she is shown investigating the house, performing along with two clones of herself which disappear in a burst of flames, and posing in front of an aquarium. In an interview, Năstase explained his vision for the clip: "The song is a story of a toxic relationship, so we created a character that enters a mansion which [...] is haunted by various spirits". Peony added: "The main character [is] trapped in a parallel universe — haunted by her own ghost. Igor, the dog, is the house guardian. As I become part of the house, Igor becomes my guardian too".

The music video was released to generally positive reviews from critics. Nick van Lith of ESCXtra praised it, noting a "moody, haunted atmosphere". He further stated: "With clever lighting, the result is in fact a very intriguing video". Writing for Wiwibloggs, William Lee Adams echoed Van Lith's thought and went on to compare the mansion to the one in the Netflix series The Haunting of Hill House due to its "derelict walls and eerie destruction". Adams noted that the video was "bold and just a little brash", as well as "intoxicating with marine life floating in the sky and mirrors reflecting all manner of madness". Pinzon of the same publication added: "[T]he house has become a prison of Ester’s own making. Her inability to move on has turned the situation into a nightmare. The singer’s inner turmoil — put on display in such a raw and visceral way — makes the viewer feel her sorrow". CelebMix's Currinn gave a lukewarm review: "Peony looks like a witch who has been scorned and she’s practising her magic so that she’s prepared to get her own back. It’s a pure performance piece. [...] It’s a haunting visual but they could've done more with her magical abilities – it leaves a lot to be desired, much like the song itself".

For further promotion, Peony performed "On a Sunday" live during O melodie pentru Europa 2019 on 2 March, Moldova's national final to select their entrant for the Eurovision Song Contest 2019. Throughout the same month, she appeared to sing the song on Romanian television shows Neața cu Răzvan și Dani, La Măruță, Vorbește lumea, Teo Show, and Star matinal, alongside performances on Pro FM, București FM, Digi FM and Magic FM. In April, she performed at Eurovision pre-parties, including Amsterdam's Eurovision in Concert and PreParty ES in Madrid.

== At Eurovision ==
=== National selection ===
TVR allowed artists and composers to submit their entries for the Selecția Națională between 9 November and 10 December 2018 for the selection of their entry for the Eurovision Song Contest 2019. A jury panel made up of music professionals rated all songs; their 24 semi-finalists were revealed on 20 December. During the contest's second semi-final held on 10 February 2019, Peony qualified for the final in third place by the jury. On the latter occasion one week later, she was chosen to represent Romania at Eurovision with 65 total points, consisting of 62 jury points (first overall) and three televoting points (eighth overall). Peony's victory was met with mixed reactions from the public. During her show, the singer sat on a vintage armchair while wearing a red dress and painted branches onto her arms. She was accompanied by two backing vocalists, a guitarist and a drummer, while rain and a haunted house were projected on the LED screen behind her. Alexandra Chivu of Fanatik praised Peony's performance, calling it "apoteotic" and her vocal delivery "flawless". Wiwibloggs' Geister labelled the graphic display as "stunning". In more mixed reviews, Currinn of CelebMix wrote that "the stage production [...] certainly does need some work", while Thomas Ling from Radio Times found the performance "memorable", yet called certain aspects "awkward".

=== In Tel Aviv ===
The Eurovision Song Contest 2019 took place at Expo Tel Aviv in Tel Aviv, Israel and consisted of two semi-finals on 14 and 16 May, and the final on 18 May 2019. According to Eurovision rules, each country, except the host country and the "Big Five" (France, Germany, Italy, Spain and the United Kingdom), were required to qualify from one of two semi-finals to compete for the final; the top ten countries from each semi-final progressed to the final. In April 2019, it was announced that "On a Sunday" would be performed sixth in the second semi-final of the contest, following Latvia and preceding Denmark. Romania failed to qualify for the final, marking their second non-qualification, consecutive to the previous one.

==== Live performance and reception ====
Regarding Peony's Năstase-directed performance, it was revealed that it would hold on to the vision used for the song's music video. Onstage, Peony was accompanied by two female backing vocalists—Adela and Antonia—Șerbu, and two male dancers—Vlad Mircea and Valentin Cristian Chiș; the latter was the show's choreographer. Năstase elaborated: "All the show elements we could use—special effects, lights and graphics—we have prepared. We have kept the armchair presented in the national final because it is integrated into a special story on the graphics". 2019 marked the first time that there was a specific emphasis being put on Romania's staging and special effects in its contest history, with TVR's budget for the aforementioned amounting to circa 100,000 euros. It was also the first year that Romania produced its own graphics for Eurovision. Năstase elaborated: "It is the first time that more money has been allocated for the show than for the delegation, compared to the past years [...] No one is going to notice you if you do not invest in the show". Peony's technical rehearsals in Tel Aviv—costing between 2,000 and 2,500 euros each—were scheduled to take place on 6 May and 10 May 2019. She prepared for her performance by taking voice lessons.

During her goth-inspired performance, Peony is seen in front of a house haunted by two spirits—portrayed as ghosts "who have been held captive in the haunted house for several generations" by her backing vocalists. The accompanying dancers enact a battle between good and evil which is visually amplified by the presentation of water, fire and various dark graphics on the LED screens, as well as through pyrotechnics. The fight is also representative of the song's lyrics, reflecting the toxic relationship that is discussed in them. During a large amount of the performance, Peony sits on a red armchair, with the dancers advancing to the center of the stage throughout the track's first verse and joining her around the refrain. As she sings, Peony tries to free herself from and not remain a "prisoner of her demon", ultimately "unleash[ing] fire defeating evil and darkness". The show ends with a brighter stage in comparison to the beginning and shots of peonies blooming from scorched earth in the background, symbolizing a "hopeful future". During the performance, Peony wears a longer-length black blazer embellished with black sequins and beads, along with a white shirt with a large collar and a black "peasant" and "Victorian"-inspired skirt. The dancers sport "Renaissance-style" and "fetish" neck ruffs with waistcoats with an open back that exposes black harnesses.

The performance was met with generally positive responses from critics. Writing for Wiwibloggs, Angus Quinn likened the staging to a "world that appears to collapse in on itself" similar to Atlantis. He described Peony as channeling Marlene Dietrich and Count Dracula, and commented: "Ester Peony is a truly captivating presence. Her magnetism draws her dancers in. [...] This channels Transylvania, makes Dracula fashionable, and explodes in a fiery climax to close". Stratos Agadellis of ESCToday wrote that the singer's outfit combined both masculine and feminine elements, but criticized it to be slightly "disjointed". EuroVisionary's Michael Outerson described the performance as having a "New Orleans feel", specifically due to the "haunted house element it portrays". He likened the female background singers' clothing to that of a school girl. He was slightly critical of the staging, writing: "They need to work on their stage entrance".

==== Points awarded to Romania ====
Below is a breakdown of points awarded to Romania in the contest's second semi-final, as well as the breakdown of the jury voting and televoting conducted during the show. Romania was placed 13th with a total of 71 points. The country received 24 televoting points, which consisted of 12 awarded by Moldova, ten by Italy, as well as one by Ireland and the United Kingdom. The jury points added up to 47, including 12 from Russia and Moldova, as well as eight from Azerbaijan.

Points awarded to Romania (Semi-Final 2)
Televote
12 points	10 points	8 points	7 points	6 points
Moldova	Italy			
5 points	4 points	3 points	2 points	1 point
				Ireland; United Kingdom
Jury
12 points	10 points	8 points	7 points	6 points
Russia; Moldova		Azerbaijan		
5 points	4 points	3 points	2 points	1 point
United Kingdom	Germany		Italy; Armenia	North Macedonia; Malta

== Track listing ==
Digital download
No.	Title	Length
1.	"On a Sunday"	3:01

== Release history ==
Country	Date	Format(s)	Label	Ref.
Romania	17 January 2019	Digital download; streaming	Independent	
Romania	N/A 2019	CD	Cat Music	
