= David Gällring =

- Born: Karlskrona, Sweden
- Origin: Växjö, Sweden
- Genres: EDM, pop
- Occupations: Songwriter, producer, designer
- Years active: 2012–present
- Website: http://www.david.moodswingstudio.se

David Gällring is a Swedish songwriter, producer, and designer from Växjö, Sweden. He studied music production at the Linnaeus University. After graduation, he started his own company Mood Swing Studio, enabling him to work with artists, bands, labels, and songwriters in various projects and genres. In 2014, Gällring and Karl Sahlin formed the EDM duo NiERO, having independently released "Reach for the Stars", which had a wide reach on Spotify, and another two singles via the British label We Are Intelligence. Shortly after, they decided to act as a songwriting duo instead.

== Discography ==
=== NiERO ===
==== Singles ====
- 2014: "Captain"
- 2015: "Reach for the Stars" (Feat. Emma Olsson)
- 2015: "Supercell"
- 2015: "Runaways"

=== Production/Songwriting ===
==== Entries in Eurovision Song Contest Pre-Selections ====
Year	Country	Artist	Song	Result
2017	Moldova	Dana Rogovski	"Gave You Everything"	–
2018	Moldova	Vera Țurcanu	"Black Heart"	2nd
2019	Moldova	Vera Țurcanu	"Cold"	3rd

==== Songwriting Credits ====
Year	Artist	Title	Form	Credits
2014	Johanna Velin	"Until We Crash"	Single	Songwriting, production, mixing
2014	Dann Rex	Onion Cannon	Album	Mixing, mastering
2014	NiERO	"Captain"	Single	Songwriting, production, mixing
2014	NiERO	"Reach for the Stars"	Single	Songwriting, production, mixing
2015	NiERO	"Supercell"	Single	Songwriting, production, mixing
2015	NiERO	"Runaways"	Single	Songwriting, production, mixing
2015	Riksreliket	"I De Många Tvivlens Stunder"	Single	Arrangement, production, mixing
2015	Zara Stiberg	"Will You Be My Love"	Single	Songwriting, production, mixing
2015	Martin Lorentzson	"Love You Bro"	Single	Production, mastering
2016	Olle Nyman	"När Du Sa Nej"	Single	Songwriting, production, mixing
2017	Olle Nyman	"Jag Och Du"	Single	Songwriting, production, mixing
2017	Dana Rogovski	"Gave You Everything"	Single	Songwriting, production, mixing
2017	Victor Brodin	"Dance With Me"	Single	Songwriting, production
2018	Vera Țurcanu	"Black Heart"	Single	Songwriting, production, mixing
2019	Vera Țurcanu	"Cold"	Single	Songwriting, production, mixing
2019	Vera Țurcanu	Cold	EP	Songwriting, production, mixing
2019	Vera Țurcanu	"Umbrele"	Single	Songwriting
2019	Casanovas	"Ikväll Är Det Jag Som Är Kung"	Single	Songwriting
