= John Ballard (music producer) =

Scottish singer-songwriter and record producer

John Ballard (born 14 April 1951) is a Scottish singer-songwriter and record producer, based in Gothenburg, Sweden, where he has a recording studio (Tuff Studios). At Tuff Studios he has produced amongst others, Ace of Base (their first three albums), as well as co-writing some of their songs.

== Discography ==
As Producer:
Year	Artist(s)	Song
1992	Ace Of Base	"Happy Nation"
1993	Ace Of Base	"The Sign"
1995	Ace Of Base	"The Bridge"
1998	Ace Of Base	"Life Is A Flower"

As Composer/writer or co-writer:
Year	Artist(s)	Song	Notes
	Ace Of Base	"No Stranger to Love"	
	Ace Of Base	"Mercy Mercy"	
	Ace Of Base	"Look Around Me"	Unreleased
	Ace Of Base	"Angel of Love"	Unreleased
1995	Ace Of Base	"Beautiful Life"	Released on the album The Bridge
1995	Ace Of Base	"Perfect World"	Released on the album The Bridge
1995	Ace Of Base	"Que Sera"	Released on the album The Bridge
1995	Ace Of Base	"Edge of Heaven"	Released on the album The Bridge
1998	Ace Of Base	"I Pray"	Released on the album Flowers
1998	Ace Of Base	"Don't Go Away"	Released on the albums Cruel Summer and Flowers
2013	Farid Mammadov	"Hold Me"	Azerbaijan entry in the Eurovision Song Contest, took 2nd place
2014	Tolmachevy Sisters	"Shine"	Russian entry in the Eurovision Song Contest, took 7th place
2016	Sergey Lazarev	"You Are the Only One"	Russian entry in the Eurovision Song Contest, took 3rd place
2017	Demy	"This Is Love"	Greek entry in the Eurovision Song Contest, took 19th place
2018	DoReDoS	"My Lucky Day"	Moldovan entry in the Eurovision Song Contest, took 10th place

Ballard has also written songs for the Eurovision Song Contest and also performed twice in the Swedish qualification rounds of ESC in the 1980s:

Year	Artist(s)	Song	Notes
1983	John Ballard/Ann-Louise Hanson	"Bara En Enda Gång"	Took 5th place in the Swedish qualification rounds of the ESC.
1984	John Ballard	"Rendez-Vous"	Took 3rd place in the Swedish qualification rounds of the ESC.

== Other projects ==
Ballard founded the successful Swedish band Bubbles, and wrote and recorded most of their songs.

He wrote and recorded "Somewhere" (performed by Bubbles), the title track for the European release of Ice Age.

He wrote most of the tracks for the Swedish boy band Together, including the track "Vänner" (Friends) which went to number one in Sweden.
