= Trooper (Romanian band) =

Romanian heavy metal band

- Origin: Târgoviște, Romania
- Genres: Hard rock, heavy metal
- Years active: 1995–present
- Label: HMM
- Members: Alin "Coiotu'" Dincă; Aurelian "Balaurul" Dincă; Ionut Covalciuc; Ionut Radulescu
- Website: trooper.ro

Trooper is a Romanian heavy metal band. It was formed on 25 October 1995, by brothers Alin and Aurelian Dincă and Ionuţ Rădulescu being influenced by bands like Iron Maiden or Judas Priest. The band used to be called Megarock, then White Wolf. Once with the arrival of Ionuţ "Negative" Fleancu the band was renamed to Trooper. Poll conducted by the specialized Heavy Metal Magazine in 2001 placed Trooper first in the category Best young band. The group appeared on MTV, MCM, Atomic, TVR1, TVR2, B1 TV, Antena 1, Romania International, Prima TV, Pro TV. Throughout their career, Trooper have shared their stage with bands such as Iron Maiden, Judas Priest, Manowar, Sepultura, Kreator and Evergrey.

== Discography ==
- 2001 - Trooper (demo)
- 2002 - Trooper I (full-length)
- 2004 - EP (EP)
- 2005 - Desant (full-length)
- 2006 - Gloria (tribute to Iris)
- 2006 - Electric (full-length)
- 2007 - 12 Ani - Amintiri (boxset)
- 2008 - Rock'N'Roll Pozitiv (full-length)
- 2009 - Vlad Ţepeş - Poemele Valahiei (full-length)
- 2010 - 15 (live album)
- 2011 - Voodoo (full-length)
- 2013 - Atmosfera (full-length)
- 2016 - În ziua a opta (full-length)
- 2018 - Stefan cel Mare - Poemele Moldovei (full-length)
- 2019 - Strigat Best Of 2002 - 2019 (boxset)
- 2022 - X (full-length)
- 2024 - Mihai Viteazu - Poemele Românilor (full-length)
- 2024 - Trilogia poemelor (boxset)
- 2025 - Neuitate ( full-length)

== Band members ==
- Alin "Coiotu" Dincă - vocals (1995–present)
- Aurelian "Balaur" Dincă - Lead/rhythm guitar (1995–present)
- Cristian Oftez - Lead/rhythm guitar (2014 - present)
- Luis "Lu" Pătrăşcan - Bass guitar (2025-prezent)
- Ionuţ "John" Covalciuc - Drums (1999–present)

=== Past members ===
- Ionuț "Negative" Fleancu – drums (1996–1999)
- Ispas Gabriel – guitar (1996–1997)
- Radu "Schijă" Pites – guitar (1997–1999, died in 2009)
- Laurențiu Popa – guitar (1999–2019)
- Ionuţ "Oscar" Rădulescu - Bass guitar (1995–2025)
