= DoReDoS =

Moldovan musical trio

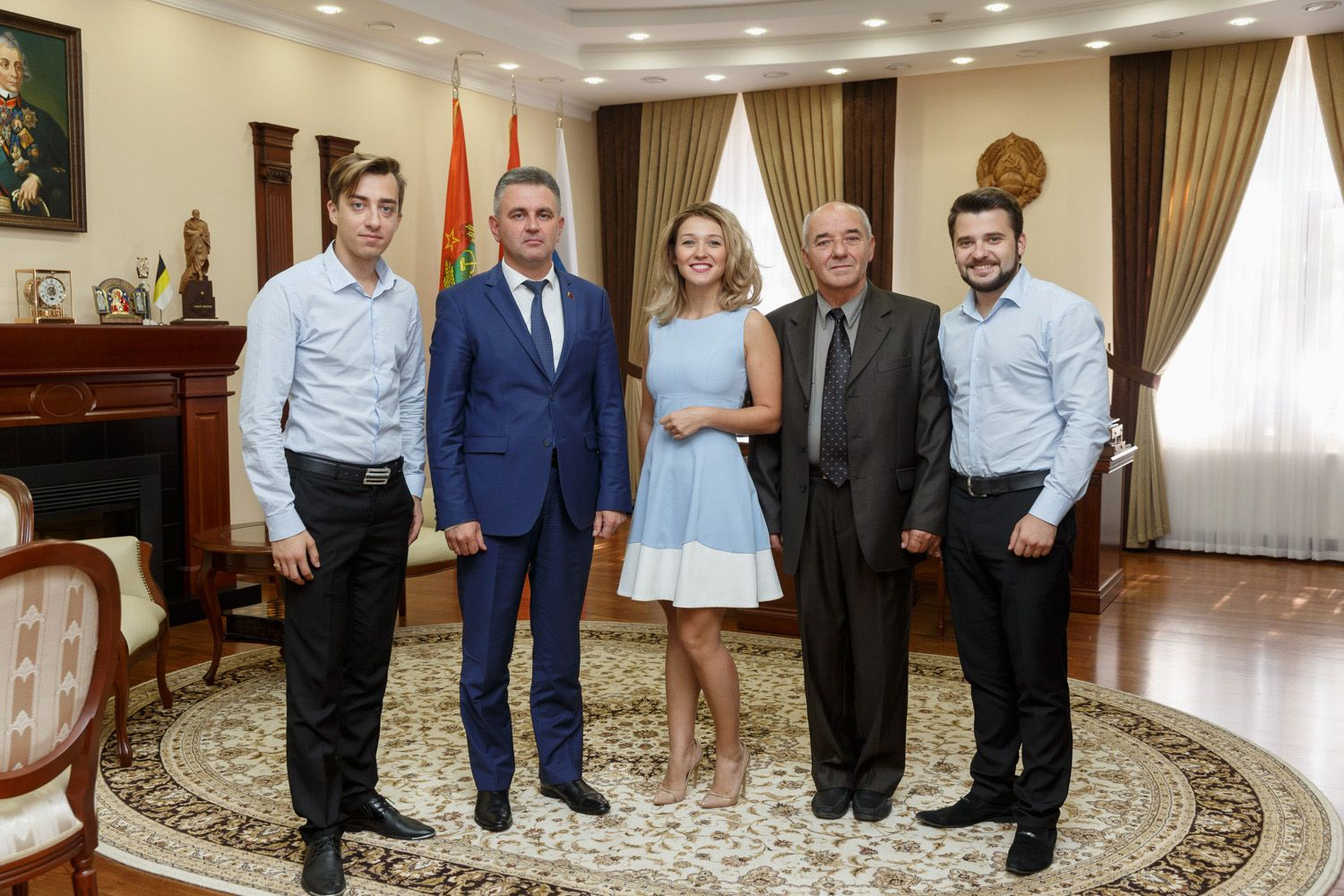
- DoReDos meeting the President of Transnistria in 2017

Background information
- Origin: Rîbnița, Moldova
- Genres: Worldbeat; dance
- Years active: 2011–present
- Members: Marina Djundyet; Eugeniu Andrianov; Sergiu Mîța

DoReDoS is a Moldovan trio from Rîbnița, Transnistria. The group consists of Marina Djundyet, Eugeniu Andrianov and Sergiu Mîța. They represented Moldova in the Eurovision Song Contest 2018 in Lisbon, Portugal, with the song "My Lucky Day". They had previously attempted to represent Moldova at Eurovision in 2015 and 2016. They won New Wave 2017 for Moldova.

== History ==
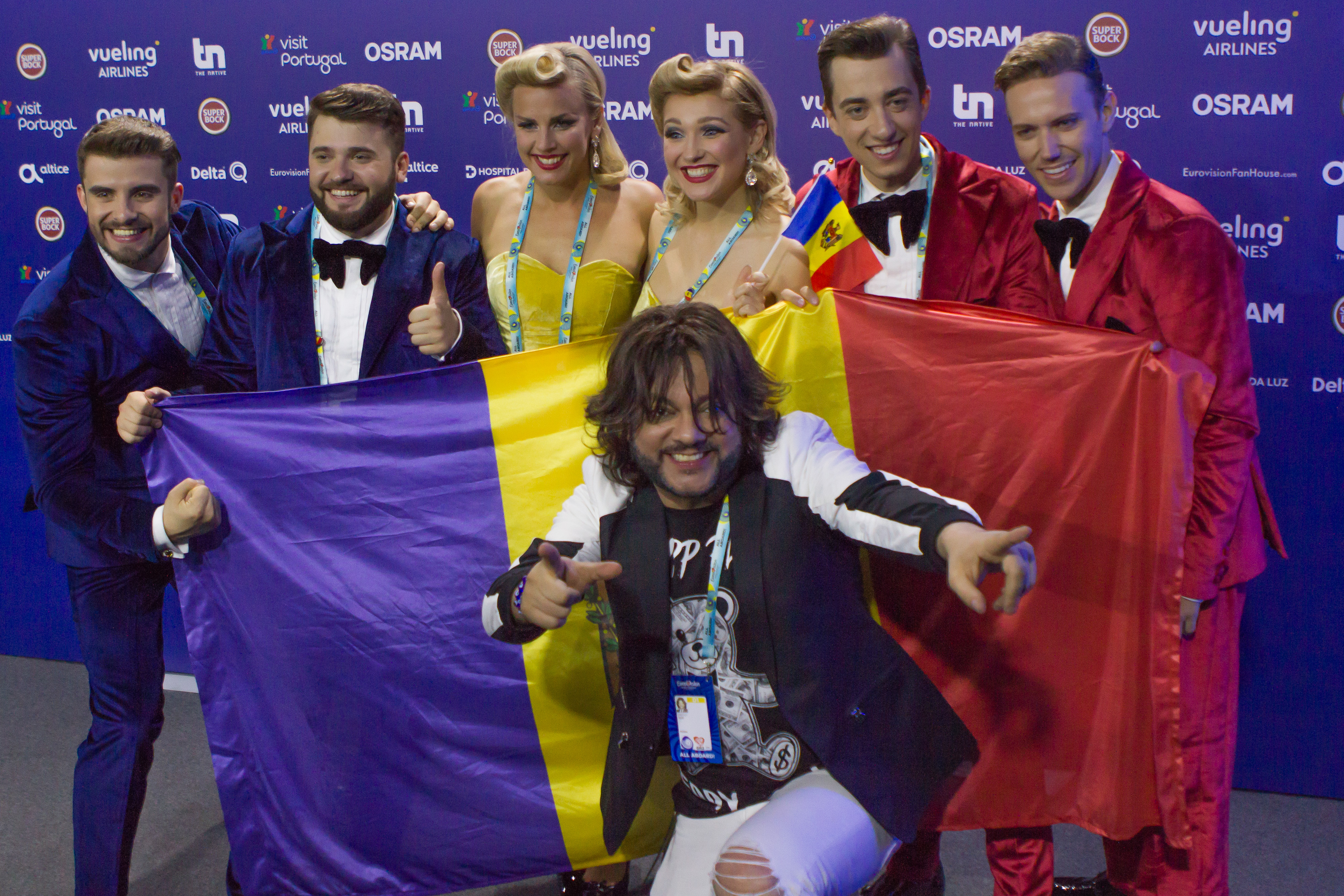
DoReDoS and Philipp Kirkorov

The “DoReDos” trio was founded in 2011, in Rîbnița town (Transnistria). In 2017, they became winners at the New Wave (Новая волна) competition where they represented Moldova. In March 2018, they began to perform under the Bis Music music label. Philipp Kirkorov, who is also the composer of the song "My Lucky Day", took an active role in preparing the trio for the Eurovision Song Contest 2018 and the group tour. At the competition, the group scored 209 points and finished in 10th place.

== Discography ==
=== Singles ===
Title	Year	Album
"Maricica"	2015	Non-album singles
"FunnyFolk"	2016	Non-album singles
"My Lucky Day"	2018	Non-album singles
"Write Your Number on My Hand"	2018	Non-album singles
"Constantine"	2018	Non-album singles

Preceded by SunStroke Project with "Hey, Mamma!"	Moldova in the Eurovision Song Contest; 2018	Succeeded by Anna Odobescu with "Stay"
