= Anna Odobescu =

Moldovan singer (born 1991)

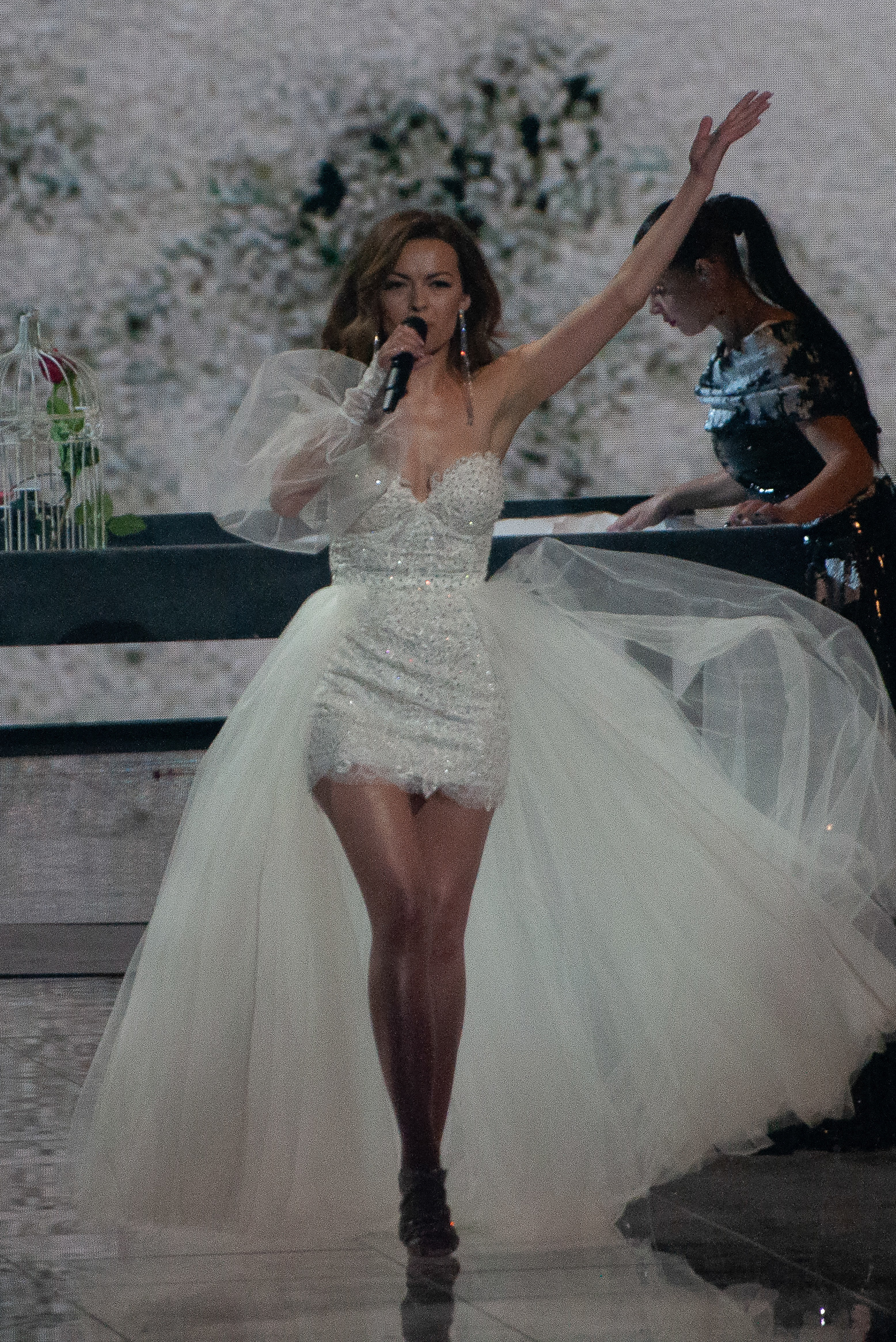
- Odobescu in 2019

Background information
- Born: 3 November 1991 (age 33); Dubăsari, Moldova
- Genres: Pop; soul
- Occupation: Singer
- Years active: 2018–present

Anna Odobescu (born 3 November 1991) is a Moldovan singer. She represented her country at the Eurovision Song Contest 2019 with her song "Stay", after winning the national selection show O melodie pentru Europa on 2 March 2019. She failed to qualify from the semi-finals. In 2020, she appeared in the Netflix film Eurovision Song Contest: The Story Of Fire Saga, playing herself.

== Discography ==
=== Singles ===
Title	Year	Album
"Agony"	2018	Non-album singles
"Stay"	2019	Non-album singles
"Dreaming"	2019	Non-album singles
"My Oh My"	2020	Non-album singles

Preceded by DoReDoS with "My Lucky Day"	Moldova in the Eurovision Song Contest; 2019	Succeeded by Natalia Gordienko with "Prison"
