= Stay (Anna Odobescu song) =

2019 song by Anna Odobescu

Single by Anna Odobescu
- Released: 25 January 2019
- Length: 3:00
- Songwriters: Georgios Kalpakidis; Thomas Reil; Jeppe Reil; Maria Broberg

Anna Odobescu singles chronology
"Agony" (2018)	"Stay" (2019)

Music video
- "Stay" on YouTube

Eurovision Song Contest 2019 entry
- Country: Moldova
- Artist: Anna Odobescu
- Language: English
- Composers: Georgios Kalpakidis; Thomas Reil; Jeppe Reil; Maria Broberg
- Lyricists: Georgios Kalpakidis; Thomas Reil; Jeppe Reil; Maria Broberg

Finals performance
- Semi-final result: 12th
- Semi-final points: 85
- Final result: Did not qualify

Entry chronology
- ◄ "My Lucky Day" (2018)
- "Prison" (2020) ►

"Stay" is a song by Moldovan singer Anna Odobescu. It represented Moldova in the Eurovision Song Contest 2019 in Tel Aviv, Israel, after winning O melodie pentru Europa 2019, Moldova's national final. It did not qualify for the final.

== Background ==
According to Odobescu, the song has a message of caring for your loved ones, and "not wanting to give up, not caring about the consequences, just wanting to fight for the one you love."

On 13 March 2019, Odobescu would release a revamp of "Stay", along with the official music video.

== Eurovision Song Contest ==
=== O melodie pentru Europa 2019 ===
O melodie pentru Europa 2019 was the national final format developed by TRM in order to select Moldova's entry for the Eurovision Song Contest 2019. The event took place on 2 March 2019. The selection of the competing entries for the national final and ultimately the Moldovan Eurovision entry took place over two rounds. The first round was a live audition of the received submissions in front of a jury panel that took place on 2 February 2019. Entries were assessed on criteria such as voice quality, stage presence and strength of the composition. The panel selected 10 finalists to proceed to the second round, the televised national final. 10 finalists competed in the final on 2 March 2019, where the winner was selected by the 50/50 combination of an expert jury vote and a public televote.

The final took place on 2 March 2019. Ten songs competed and the winner was selected based on the combination of a public televote and the votes of an expert jury. "Stay" was selected as the winner, earning 22 points, with 12 coming from the jury and 10 from the televote.

=== At Eurovision ===
The song represented Moldova in the Eurovision Song Contest 2019, after Anna Odobescu was selected through O melodie pentru Europa 2019, the Moldovan national selection which selected Moldova's entry for the Eurovision Song Contest. On 28 January 2019, a special allocation draw was held which placed each country into one of the two semi-finals, as well as which half of the show they would perform in. Moldova was placed into the second semi-final, to be held on 16 May 2019, and was scheduled to perform in the first half of the show. Once all the competing songs for the 2019 contest had been released, the running order for the semi-finals was decided by the show's producers rather, than through another draw, so that similar songs were not placed next to each other. Moldova was performed in position 3.

== Track listing ==
Digital download
No.	Title	Length
1.	"Stay"	3:00
2.	"Stay" (alternative edit)	3:00
3.	"Stay" (instrumental version)	3:00
4.	"Stay" (ESC Mix)	3:00
5.	"Stay" (ESC Mix Instrumental)	3:00
