= Ester Peony =

Romanian singer and songwriter (born 1993)

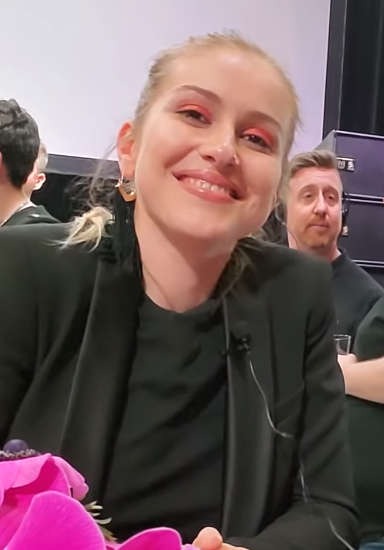
- Peony during an interview in 2019

Background information
- Born: Ester Alexandra Crețu; 21 July 1993 (age 33); Câmpulung, Romania
- Occupations: Singer; songwriter
- Instrument: Vocals
- Years active: 2014–present
- Label: Cat

Ester Alexandra Crețu (Romanian pronunciation: [ˈester alekˈsandra ˈkret͡su]; born 21 July 1993), known professionally as Ester Peony (formerly only Ester), is a Romanian singer and songwriter. She represented Romania in the Eurovision Song Contest 2019 with the song "On a Sunday" after winning the selection show Selecția Națională 2019. However, she failed to qualify for the Grand Final in Tel Aviv. Peony started to compose music for Romanian artists before gaining recognition for posting covers on YouTube in 2015. Later that year, she attained commercial success in Romania with her single "Sub aripa ta" featuring Vescan.

== Early life ==
Ester Alexandra Crețu was born in Câmpulung, Romania on 21 July 1993. She and her parents emigrated to Montreal, Canada in 2001. There, she showed a particular interest in music and started studying jazz singing at the age of eight. Peony relocated to Romania four years later and graduated from the Dinu Lipatti High School of Art in Pitești, where she studied classic singing and classic guitar. In 2013, she enrolled at the Music Interpretation Faculty in Bucharest to study jazz.

== Career ==
Peony released her debut single "Cuminte de Crăciun" under her mononym Ester in late 2014. At the same time, she had been composing music for other Romanian artists. In 2015, she started posting covers on YouTube. The cover videos gained her attention, and she was subsequently offered a record deal with a Romanian label. Later that year, Peony released the song "Sub aripa ta", featuring Romanian rapper Vescan. The song was played on radio and television stations across the country. In 2016, she embarked on her first tour with Vescan. The singer changed her stage name to Ester Peony and independently distributed her debut EP Dig It in May 2018, for which she was also one of the main composers.

In February 2019, Romanian Television (TVR) announced her as the Romanian representative for the Eurovision Song Contest 2019 in Tel Aviv, Israel, after she won the selection show Selecția Națională with her song "On a Sunday". The announcement was met with mixed reactions from the public. In 2019, TVR were able to spend significant amounts on their Eurovision entry for the first time; they spent about 100,000 euros on the visual and special effects in the performance. Romania failed to qualify for the Eurovision Grand Final as their second consecutive—and second overall—non-qualification, placing 13th with 71 points. During her Eurovision time, Peony had signed a record deal with Cat Music. She performed at the 2019 Golden Stag Festival.

== Influences and personal life ==
Peony cites Delia, Celine Dion, Whitney Houston, Cher, Queen, Michael Jackson and Ariana Grande as some of her musical inspirations. Her stage name refers to the peony flower. In Romanian, "peony" translates to "bujor", which refers to part of her mother's name. The singer has been in a relationship with Alexandru Șerbu since about 2013; Șerbu acted as producer for "On a Sunday". Peony is a Christian.

== Discography ==
=== Extended plays ===
Title	Details
Dig It	Released: 12 May 2018; Label: Independent; Formats: Digital download

=== Singles ===
==== As lead artist ====
List of singles as lead artist, with selected chart positions
Title	Year	Peak chart positions	Album
Title	Year	ROM	Album
"Cuminte de Crăciun" (as Ester featuring Doddy, Vescan and Mahia Beldo)	2014	—	Non-album singles
"Sub aripa ta" (as Ester featuring Vescan)	2015	32	Non-album singles
"Iubire" (as Ester)	2015	—	Non-album singles
"1000 de motive" (as Ester featuring Phelipe)	2016	—	Non-album singles
"On a Sunday"	2019	—	Non-album singles
"7 Roses"	2019	—	Non-album singles
"Me pone loca"	2020	—	Non-album singles
"Dernière danse" (with Scott Rills)	2021	—	Non-album singles
"Tatoué" (with Sasha Lopez)	2021	—	Non-album singles
"—" denotes a recording that did not chart or was not released in that territory.

==== As featured artist ====
Title	Year	Peak chart positions	Album
Title	Year	BEL (WA) Tip	Album
"Oameni" (Vescan featuring Ester, Alan and Kepa)	2015	—	Non-album single
"Dernière danse" (HIDDN and RudeLies featuring Ester Peony)	2019	16	Non-album single
"—" denotes an item that did not chart or was not released in that territory.

Preceded by The Humans with "Goodbye"	Romania in the Eurovision Song Contest; 2019	Succeeded by Roxen with "Alcohol You"
