= Niklas Bergqvist =

- Born: October 6, 1962 (age 62); Stockholm, Sweden
- Genres: Pop; Dance; Rock
- Occupations: Songwriter; Producer; Musician
- Instruments: Bass; Keyboard; Guitar; Drums
- Years active: 1984–present

Niklas Bergqvist (born 6 October 1962 in Stockholm), is a Swedish songwriter, producer and musician. His career started in 1984, as a founding member of the Synthpop band Shanghai, which he started along his school friends. The band released two albums and numerous singles, with their debut single "Ballerina", produced by former Europe guitarist Kee Marcello.

Following the success of the single, the album also gained positive attention, resulting in the band touring around Sweden. The second, and final, studio album was produced by Swedish pop star Harpo. After the band split-up in 1987, Bergqvist formed and played in several other bands until he decided to focus more on songwriting, resulting in several releases ever since. In 2015, he founded the independent record label Tracks of Sweden with songwriting partner Simon Johansson.

== Performing Artist ==
=== Studio albums ===
Year	Title	Band
1985	Shanghai	Shanghai
1986	I Full Frihet	Shanghai

=== Singles ===
Year	Title	Band
1985	"Ballerina"	Shanghai
1985	"Bang Bang"	Shanghai
1985	"Africa"	Shanghai
1986	"Rosalina"	Shanghai
1986	"Radio Girl"	Shanghai
1986	"Skattjakt"	Shanghai
1986	"Flight 69"	Shanghai
1988	"Wham Bam Boomerang"	Small, Fat'n Beautiful
1988	"Änglar"	Small, Fat'n Beautiful
1988	"Julen Är Här"	Small, Fat'n Beautiful
1989	"Galen Kärlek"	Small, Fat'n Beautiful
1989	"S.O.S."	Small, Fat'n Beautiful

== Songwriting ==
=== Entries in Eurovision Song Contest Pre-Selections ===
2016

- "In My World" by Ruslanas Kirilkinas (Lithuania 2016), 6th
- "Life Is On Your Side" by Celina Ann (Austria 2016), Eliminated

2018

- "Dying Inside" by Valdas Lacko (Lithuania 2018), 10th (first round)
- "World On Fire" by Anastasia Malashkevich (Belarus 2018), 6th
- "Holding You" by Yevgeniy Dolich (Belarus 2018), Eliminated
- "Dance In Flames" by Doinița Gherman (Moldova 2018), 3rd
- "Endlessly" by Anna Timofei (Moldova 2018), 11th
- "Momentum" by Monika Urlik (Poland 2018), 3rd

2019

- "Dare" by Valdas Lacko (Lithuania 2019), 12th (first round)
- "A Better You" by Yevgeniy Dolich (Belarus 2019), Eliminated

2020

- "Every Hour" by July (Belarus 2020), Eliminated
- "Invisible" by Anastasia Malashkevich (Belarus 2020), 5th

2021

- "The Way I Am" by Donata (Lithuania 2021), 7th (first round)

2022

- "Remember" by Stelian (Romania 2022), Eliminated (semi-final)
