= My Lucky Day (DoReDoS song) =

2018 single by DoReDoS

Single by DoReDoS
- Released: 23 March 2018
- Genre: Dance-pop; pop-folk
- Length: 3:03
- Label: BIS Music
- Songwriter(s): Philipp Kirkorov, John Ballard
- Producer(s): Philipp Kirkorov

DoReDoS singles chronology
| "FunnyFolk" (2016) | "My Lucky Day" (2018) | "Write Your Number On My Hand" (2018) |

Music video
- "My Lucky Day" on YouTube

Eurovision Song Contest 2018 entry
- Country: Moldova
- Artist(s): DoReDoS
- Language: English
- Composer(s): Philipp Kirkorov
- Lyricist(s): John Ballard

Finals performance
- Semi-final result: 3rd
- Semi-final points: 235
- Final result: 10th
- Final points: 209

Entry chronology
- ◄ "Hey, Mamma!" (2017)
- "Stay" (2019) ►

Official performance video
- "My Lucky Day" (Second Semi-Final) on YouTube "My Lucky Day" (Grand Final) on YouTube

"My Lucky Day" is a 2018 song performed by Moldovan group DoReDoS. The song was written by Russian music composer Philipp Kirkorov. The song would represent Moldova in the Eurovision Song Contest 2018 after winning O melodie pentru Europa 2018, Moldova's national final for that year's Eurovision Song Contest.

== Release ==
On 16 January 2018, DoReDoS would announce their bid for O melodie pentru Europa 2018 with their song "My Lucky Day".

On 28 February 2018, the band would announce that they had released a remix of "My Lucky Day" with German DJ Shantel.

On 24 April 2018, a Russian "My Lucky Day" cover was released by the band.

== Composition ==
The song talks about two people making "music" together, with a metaphor for love being key for their relationship. Their passion for "music" and "rhythm" drives the pair to have fun. The song is reported to have borrowed elements from Moldovan folk music and dance.

== Music video ==
The official music video for "My Lucky Day" was released on 12 March 2018. The video was filmed in Santorini, an island in the European nation of Greece.

== Eurovision Song Contest ==
=== O melodie pentru Europa 2018 ===
O melodie pentru Europa 2018 was the national final format developed by TRM in order to select Moldova's entry for the Eurovision Song Contest 2018. The event took place at the TRM Studio 2 in Chișinău on 24 February 2018. Artists and composers had the opportunity to submit their entries between 1 December 2017 and 15 January 2018. Artists could submit more than one song, and an international act was able to compete only if they were part of a duo or group where 50% of the lead vocalists were of Moldovan nationality.

A live audition round took place on 1 February 2020 at the Karaoke Concert Hall Atrium in Chișinău where 16 finalists were selected to advance.

In the final, sixteen songs competed and the winner was selected based on the combination of a public televote and the votes of an expert jury. At the end of the voting, "My Lucky Day" was selected as the winner of the contest, and as a result became the Moldovan song for the Eurovision Song Contest 2018.

=== At Eurovision ===
According to Eurovision rules, all nations with the exceptions of the host country and the "Big Five" (France, Germany, Italy, Spain and the United Kingdom) are required to qualify from one of two semi-finals in order to compete for the final; the top ten countries from each semi-final progress to the final. The European Broadcasting Union (EBU) split up the competing countries into six different pots based on voting patterns from previous contests, with countries with favourable voting histories put into the same pot. On 29 January 2018, a special allocation draw was held which placed each country into one of the two semi-finals, as well as which half of the show they would perform in. Moldova was placed into the second semi-final, to be held on 10 May 2018, and was scheduled to perform in the first half of the show.

Before the show, DoReDoS performer Marina Djundiet would report that the Eurovision performance would be different than their national final and Eurovision pre-party performances, saying that "for sure we’re gonna be different. The show is gonna be unusual for Eurovision... very funny and interesting."

DoReDoS took part in technical rehearsals on 1 and 5 May, followed by dress rehearsals on 9 and 10 May. This included the jury show on 9 May where the professional juries of each country watched and voted on the competing entries.

The Moldovan performance featured the members of DoReDoS dressed in the colours of the Moldovan flag performing on stage with three backing vocalists/dancers, all of them with the same outfits. Sergiu Mîța was dressed in a blue suit, while Marina Djundyet was dressed in a yellow dress and Eugeniu Andrianov in a red suit. The stage featured a white box with small doors that were opened and closed to reveal the arms, legs, and faces of the performers, of which Mîța and Djundyet walked around at the beginning. The performance was concluded with all group members getting out of the box and joined by the backing performers. DoReDoS would later state that: "It's a song about the relationship between one woman and two men. The white structure is a house, and when the windows open you get to see a visual representation of what the singers at that moment are thinking."

The song competed in the second semi-final, held on 10 May 2018. Moldova was placed as the seventh performer, after Russia and before the Netherlands. The song was announced as one of the qualifiers in the semifinal, and progressed to the grand final, held on 12 May 2018. In the grand final, the song was performed nineteenth in the running order, following Bulgaria and before Sweden. 'My Lucky Day' placed tenth overall, scoring 209 points. It was then later revealed that Moldova placed third in the semi-final, receiving a total of 235 points, 153 points from the televoting and 82 points from the juries.

== Track listing ==
Digital download
| No. | Title | Length |
|---|---|---|
| 1. | "My Lucky Day" | 3:03 |
| 2. | "My Lucky Day" (karaoke version) | 3:03 |

== Release history ==
| Region | Date | Format | Label |
|---|---|---|---|
| Worldwide | 23 March 2018 | Digital download | BIS Music |
