= Finland in the Eurovision Song Contest 2019 =

- Eurovision Song Contest 2019
- Participating broadcaster: Yleisradio (Yle)
- Country: Finland
- Selection process: Artist: Internal selection Song: Uuden Musiikin Kilpailu 2019
- Selection date: Artist: 29 January 2019; Song: 2 March 2019

Competing entry
- Song: "Look Away"
- Artist: Darude feat. Sebastian Rejman
- Songwriters: Ville Virtanen; Sebastian Rejman

Placement
- Semi-final result: Failed to qualify (17th)

Participation chronology

Finland was represented at the Eurovision Song Contest 2019 with the song "Look Away" written and performed by Ville Virtanen under the stage name Darude and Sebastian Rejman. The Finnish participating broadcaster, Yleisradio (Yle), organised the national final Uuden Musiikin Kilpailu 2019 in order to select its entry for the contest, after having previously selected the performers internally. Three songs were selected to compete in the national final on 2 March 2019 where the 50/50 combination of votes from eight international jury groups and votes from the public selected "Look Away" as the winning song.

Finland was drawn to compete in the first semi-final of the Eurovision Song Contest which took place on 14 May 2019. Performing during the show in position 3, "Look Away" was not announced among the top 10 entries of the first semi-final and therefore did not qualify to compete in the final. It was later revealed that Finland placed seventeenth (last) out of the 17 participating countries in the semi-final with 23 points.

== Background ==
Prior to the 2019 contest, Yleisradio (Yle) had participated in the Eurovision Song Contest representing Finland fifty-two times since its first entry in 1961. It has won the contest once in 2006 with the song "Hard Rock Hallelujah" performed by Lordi. In 2018, "Monsters" performed by Saara Aalto managed to qualify to the final for the first time since 2014 and placed twenty-fifth.

As part of its duties as participating broadcaster, Yle organises the selection of its entry in the Eurovision Song Contest and broadcasts the event in the country. The broadcaster confirmed its intentions to participate at the 2019 contest on 13 September 2018. Yle had selected its entries for the contest through national final competitions that have varied in format over the years. Between 1961 and 2011, a selection show that was often titled Euroviisukarsinta highlighted that the purpose of the program was to select a song for Eurovision. However, since 2012, the broadcaster has organised the selection show Uuden Musiikin Kilpailu (UMK), which focuses on showcasing new music with the winning song being selected as the Finnish entry for that year. In 2018, Yle opted to internally select the artist with the song selected through Uuden Musiikin Kilpailu, a procedure that continued for the entry for the 2019 contest as announced by the broadcaster along with its participation confirmation.

== Before Eurovision ==
=== Artist selection ===
Yle announced that they had internally selected DJ Darude and singer Sebastian Rejman to represent Finland in Tel Aviv during a live streamed press conference on 29 January 2019, hosted by Krista Siegfrids, who represented Finland in 2013, Mikko Silvennoinen and Christoffer Strandberg. It was also announced during the press conference that their song would be selected through Uuden Musiikin Kilpailu 2019 with three songs competing.

=== Uuden Musiikin Kilpailu 2019 ===
Uuden Musiikin Kilpailu 2019 was the eighth edition of Uuden Musiikin Kilpailu (UMK), the music competition that selects Finland's entries for the Eurovision Song Contest. The three competing songs along with their promotional music videos were presented on 8, 15 and 22 February 2019, respectively, while the final took place on 2 March 2019 at the Logomo in Turku and hosted by Krista Siegfrids, Mikko Silvennoinen and Christoffer Strandberg. The show was broadcast on Yle TV2, online at yle.fi/umk and via radio with commentary in Swedish by Eva Frantz and Johan Lindroos on Yle X3M. All three competing songs were performed by Darude and Sebastian Rejman and "Look Away" was selected as the winning song by a 50/50 combination of public votes and eight international jury groups from the United Kingdom, Norway, Spain, Czech Republic, Sweden, Ireland, Denmark, and Israel. The viewers and the juries each had a total of 240 points to award. Each jury group distributed their points as follows: 8, 10 and 12 points. The viewer vote was based on the percentage of votes each song achieved through the following voting methods: telephone, SMS and online voting. For example, if a song gained 10% of the viewer vote, then that entry would be awarded 10% of 240 points rounded to the nearest integer: 24 points.

In addition to the performances of the competing songs, the interval act featured Danish Eurovision Song Contest 2013 winner Emmelie de Forest performing her winning Eurovision entry "Only Teardrops". The competition was watched by 358,000 viewers in Finland.

Final – 2 March 2019
R/O	Song	Songwriter(s)	Jury	Televote	Total	Place
1	"Release Me"	Ville Virtanen, Jaakko Manninen, Brandyn Burnette	70	19	89	3
2	"Superman"	Ville Virtanen, Chris Hope, Thom Bridges	74	73	147	2
3	"Look Away"	Ville Virtanen, Sebastian Rejman	96	148	244	1

Detailed International Jury Votes
R/O	Song	United Kingdom	Norway	Spain	Czech Republic	Sweden	Ireland	Denmark	Israel	Total
R/O	Song	United Kingdom	Norway	Spain	Czech Republic	Sweden	Ireland	Denmark	Israel	Total
1	"Release Me"	8	8	10	10	10	8	8	8	70
2	"Superman"	10	10	8	8	8	10	10	10	74
3	"Look Away"	12	12	12	12	12	12	12	12	96
International Jury Spokespersons
United Kingdom – William Lee Adams; Norway – Jowst; Spain – Ana Maria Bordas; Czech Republic – Jan Bors; Sweden – Gabriel Alares; Ireland – Michael Kealy; Denmark – Emmelie de Forest; Israel – Tali Eshkoli

=== Promotion ===
Darude and Sebastian Rejman made several appearances across Europe to specifically promote "Look Away" as the Finnish Eurovision entry. On 6 April, Darude and Sebastian Rejman performed during the Eurovision in Concert event which was held at the AFAS Live venue in Amsterdam, Netherlands and hosted by Cornald Maas and Marlayne. On 14 April, they performed during the London Eurovision Party, which was held at the Café de Paris venue in London, United Kingdom and hosted by Nicki French and Paddy O'Connell. On 19 April, Darude and Rejman performed during the PreParty ES event which was held at the Sala La Riviera venue in Madrid, Spain and hosted by Julia Varela and Tony Aguilar.

== At Eurovision ==
According to Eurovision rules, all nations with the exceptions of the host country and the "Big Five" (France, Germany, Italy, Spain and the United Kingdom) are required to qualify from one of two semi-finals in order to compete for the final; the top ten countries from each semi-final progress to the final. The European Broadcasting Union (EBU) split up the competing countries into six different pots based on voting patterns from previous contests, with countries with favourable voting histories put into the same pot. On 28 January 2019, a special allocation draw was held which placed each country into one of the two semi-finals, as well as which half of the show they would perform in. Finland was placed into the first semi-final, held on 14 May 2019, and was scheduled to perform in the first half of the show.

Once all the competing songs for the 2019 contest had been released, the running order for the semi-finals was decided by the shows' producers rather than through another draw, so that similar songs were not placed next to each other. Finland was set to perform in position 3, following the entry from Montenegro and preceding the entry from Poland.

The two semi-finals and the final were televised in Finland on Yle TV2 with a second audio program providing commentary in Finnish by 2013 Finnish Eurovision entrant Krista Siegfrids and Mikko Silvennoinen and in Swedish by Eva Frantz and Johan Lindroos. The three shows were broadcast via radio with Finnish commentary by Sanna Pirkkalainen and Toni Laaksonen in the two semi-finals and by Sanna Pirkkalainen and Sami Sykkö in the final on Yle Radio Suomi. The Finnish spokesperson, who announced the top 12-point score awarded by the Finnish jury during the final, was Christoffer Strandberg.

=== Semi-final ===
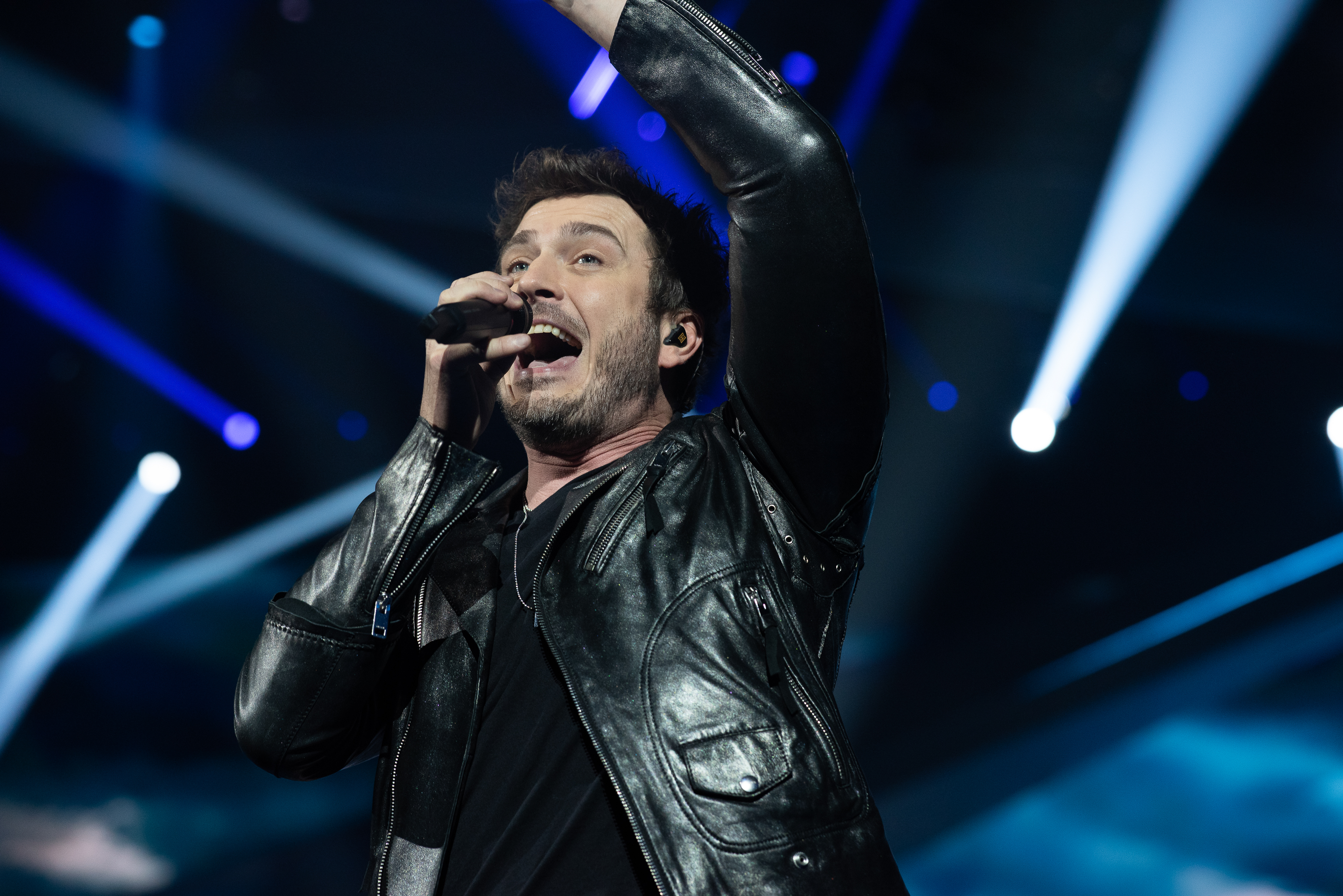
Sebastian Rejman during a rehearsal before the first semi-final

Darude and Sebastian Rejman took part in technical rehearsals on 4 and 9 May, followed by dress rehearsals on 13 and 14 May. This included the jury show on 13 May where the professional juries of each country watched and voted on the competing entries.

The Finnish performance featured Darude with a DJ mixing table on a platform to the left of the stage and Sebastian Rejman performing on the triangular catwalk, joined by a female dancer performing a choreographed routine on a raised platform in the centre of the stage. The LED screens displayed images showing global warming and the dancer appearing underwater as she at times disappear from the stage. The female dancer that joined Darude and Sebastian Rejman on stage was Etel Röhr and additional off-stage backing vocals were provided by Heini Ikonen, Matti Leino and Petri Somer.

At the end of the show, Finland was not announced among the top 10 entries in the first semi-final and therefore failed to qualify to compete in the final. It was later revealed that Finland placed seventeenth (last) in the semi-final, receiving a total of 23 points: 14 points from the televoting and 9 points from the juries.

=== Voting ===
Voting during the three shows involved each country awarding two sets of points from 1-8, 10 and 12: one from their professional jury and the other from televoting. Each nation's jury consisted of five music industry professionals who are citizens of the country they represent, with their names published before the contest to ensure transparency. This jury judged each entry based on: vocal capacity; the stage performance; the song's composition and originality; and the overall impression by the act. In addition, no member of a national jury was permitted to be related in any way to any of the competing acts in such a way that they cannot vote impartially and independently. The individual rankings of each jury member as well as the nation's televoting results were released shortly after the grand final.

Below is a breakdown of points awarded to Finland and awarded by Finland in the first semi-final and grand final of the contest, and the breakdown of the jury voting and televoting conducted during the two shows:

==== Points awarded to Finland ====
Points awarded to Finland (Semi-final 1)
Score	Televote	Jury
12 points	Estonia	
10 points		
8 points		
7 points		
6 points		
5 points		
4 points		Greece
3 points		
2 points	Iceland	Australia; Spain
1 point		Poland

==== Points awarded by Finland ====
Points awarded by Finland (Semi-final 1)
Score	Televote	Jury
12 points	Iceland	Australia
10 points	Estonia	Poland
8 points	Australia	Czech Republic
7 points	Slovenia	Greece
6 points	Poland	Estonia
5 points	Czech Republic	Slovenia
4 points	San Marino	Iceland
3 points	Portugal	Serbia
2 points	Hungary	Belgium
1 point	Serbia	Hungary

Points awarded by Finland (Final)
Score	Televote	Jury
12 points	Iceland	Sweden
10 points	Norway	Australia
8 points	Estonia	Netherlands
7 points	Sweden	North Macedonia
6 points	Australia	Slovenia
5 points	Netherlands	Italy
4 points	Russia	Czech Republic
3 points	Italy	Switzerland
2 points	Switzerland	Azerbaijan
1 point	Slovenia	Malta

==== Detailed voting results ====
The following members composed the Finnish jury:

- Susanna Vainiola (jury chairperson) – music journalist, radio DJ
- Eva Louhivuori – musician
- Lasse Wikman – singer, songwriter, lyricist
- Samuli Sirviö – producer, songwriter, musician
- Janne Hyöty – songwriter, composer, producer, musician

Detailed voting results from Finland (Semi-final 1)
R/O	Country	Jury							Televote	
R/O	Country	E. Louhivuori	L. Wikman	S. Sirviö	S. Vainiola	J. Hyöty	Rank	Points	Rank	Points
01	Cyprus	13	11	15	16	6	12		14	
02	Montenegro	15	13	14	14	16	16		16	
03	Finland									
04	Poland	1	6	2	2	12	2	10	5	6
05	Slovenia	10	15	3	5	3	6	5	4	7
06	Czech Republic	3	3	5	3	7	3	8	6	5
07	Hungary	4	8	9	11	5	10	1	9	2
08	Belarus	7	14	12	13	13	14		12	
09	Serbia	9	2	7	12	9	8	3	10	1
10	Belgium	11	7	11	1	15	9	2	11	
11	Georgia	12	10	13	15	8	13		15	
12	Australia	2	4	1	4	1	1	12	3	8
13	Iceland	5	9	10	6	4	7	4	1	12
14	Estonia	6	1	6	8	10	5	6	2	10
15	Portugal	8	12	8	9	14	11		8	3
16	Greece	14	5	4	7	2	4	7	13	
17	San Marino	16	16	16	10	11	15		7	4

Detailed voting results from Finland (Final)
R/O	Country	Jury							Televote	
R/O	Country	E. Louhivuori	L. Wikman	S. Sirviö	S. Vainiola	J. Hyöty	Rank	Points	Rank	Points
01	Malta	11	16	15	3	17	10	1	22	
02	Albania	21	22	23	15	26	23		19	
03	Czech Republic	10	10	8	9	6	7	4	15	
04	Germany	15	19	6	21	21	18		26	
05	Russia	23	9	12	20	5	14		7	4
06	Denmark	18	12	10	10	14	17		11	
07	San Marino	25	26	24	26	25	26		14	
08	North Macedonia	6	8	4	18	4	4	7	17	
09	Sweden	3	3	2	1	1	1	12	4	7
10	Slovenia	7	20	5	6	11	5	6	10	1
11	Cyprus	24	23	22	25	18	24		21	
12	Netherlands	2	2	3	7	3	3	8	6	5
13	Greece	17	7	21	11	8	15		24	
14	Israel	19	14	7	23	22	19		20	
15	Norway	13	6	18	22	10	16		2	10
16	United Kingdom	14	18	20	17	13	20		25	
17	Iceland	12	11	9	12	7	12		1	12
18	Estonia	20	5	17	13	9	13		3	8
19	Belarus	22	24	25	24	20	25		23	
20	Azerbaijan	8	15	11	4	12	9	2	16	
21	France	16	17	13	16	19	21		13	
22	Italy	5	25	19	2	24	6	5	8	3
23	Serbia	9	4	16	14	15	11		18	
24	Switzerland	4	21	14	5	16	8	3	9	2
25	Australia	1	1	1	8	2	2	10	5	6
26	Spain	26	13	26	19	23	22		12	
