= Belgium in the Eurovision Song Contest 2019 =

- Eurovision Song Contest 2019
- Participating broadcaster: Radio-télévision belge de la Communauté française (RTBF)
- Country: Belgium
- Selection process: Internal selection
- Announcement date: Artist: 14 January 2019; Song: 28 February 2019

Competing entry
- Song: "Wake Up"
- Artist: Eliot
- Songwriters: Pierre Dumoulin; Eliot Vassamillet

Placement
- Semi-final result: Failed to qualify (13th)

Participation chronology

Belgium was represented at the Eurovision Song Contest 2019 with the song "Wake Up", written by Eliot Vassamillet and Pierre Dumoulin, and performed by Vassamillet himself under his stage name Eliot. The Belgian participating broadcaster, Walloon Radio-télévision belge de la Communauté française (RTBF), internally selected its entry for the contest. The artist was announced on 14 January, and the song was presented to the public on 28 February 2019.

Belgium was drawn to compete in the first semi-final of the Eurovision Song Contest which took place on 14 May 2019. Performing during the show in position 10, "Wake Up" was not announced among the top 10 entries of the first semi-final and therefore did not qualify to compete in the final. It was later revealed that Belgium placed thirteenth out of the 17 participating countries in the semi-final with 70 points.

== Background ==
Belgium had participated in the Eurovision Song Contest sixty times since its debut as one of seven countries to take part in 1956. Since then, the country has won the contest on one occasion in 1986 with the song "J'aime la vie" performed by Sandra Kim. Following the introduction of semi-finals for the 2004 contest, Belgium had been featured in only six finals. In 2018, "A Matter of Time" performed by Sennek placed twelfth in the first semi-final and failed to advance to the final.

The Belgian participation in the contest alternates between two broadcasters: Flemish Vlaamse Radio- en Televisieomroeporganisatie (VRT) and Walloon Radio-télévision belge de la Communauté française (RTBF) at the time, with both broadcasters sharing the broadcasting rights. Both broadcasters –and their predecessors– have selected the Belgian entry using national finals and internal selections in the past. In 2017 and 2018, both VRT and RTBF internally selected the Belgian entry. On 13 July 2018, RTBF confirmed its participation in the 2019 contest and continued the internal selection procedure.

== Before Eurovision ==
=== Internal selection ===
The Belgian entry for the 2019 Eurovision Song Contest was selected via an internal selection by RTBF. On 14 January 2019, the broadcaster announced during the VivaCité radio programme Le 8/9 that they had selected Eliot Vassamillet to represent Belgium in Tel Aviv. Eliot was a participant in the seventh series of The Voice Belgique. It was also announced that Eliot had worked with lead singer of the group Roscoe, Pierre Dumoulin, on the song he would perform at the contest, which was selected by a 17-member committee from 25 proposals submitted by record companies. Dumoulin had also previously composed the 2017 Belgian Eurovision entry "City Lights".

The song, "Wake Up", was presented to the public on 8 March 2017 during the radio MNM programme De Grote Peter Van de Veire Ochtendshow. The music video for the song, filmed in Ghent and directed by Jef Boes, was released on the same day of the presentation. In regards to the song, Eliot stated: "The world has fallen asleep but it must wake up. This awakening must be collective but it requires momentum, a trigger. We, the new generation, have all the energy to make sure that changes. This is a positive message that I want to convey through this song."

=== Promotion ===
Eliot made several appearances across Europe to specifically promote "Wake Up" as the Belgian Eurovision entry. On 6 April, Eliot performed during the Eurovision in Concert event which was held at the AFAS Live venue in Amsterdam, Netherlands and hosted by Edsilia Rombley and Marlayne. On 14 April, Eliot performed during the London Eurovision Party, which was held at the Café de Paris venue in London and hosted by Nicki French and Paddy O'Connell. On 20 April, Eliot performed during the Eurovision Pre-Party Madrid event, which was held on 21 April at the Sala La Riviera venue in Madrid, Spain and hosted by Tony Aguilar and Julia Varela.

== At Eurovision ==
According to Eurovision rules, all nations with the exceptions of the host country and the "Big Five" (France, Germany, Italy, Spain and the United Kingdom) are required to qualify from one of two semi-finals in order to compete for the final; the top ten countries from each semi-final progress to the final. The European Broadcasting Union (EBU) split up the competing countries into six different pots based on voting patterns from previous contests, with countries with favourable voting histories put into the same pot. On 28 January 2019, a special allocation draw was held which placed each country into one of the two semi-finals, as well as which half of the show they would perform in. Belgium was placed into the first semi-final, to be held on 14 May 2019, and was scheduled to perform in the second half of the show.

Once all the competing songs for the 2019 contest had been released, the running order for the semi-finals was decided by the shows' producers rather than through another draw, so that similar songs were not placed next to each other. Belgium was set to perform in position 10, following the entry from Serbia and before the entry from Georgia.

The two semi-finals and the final was broadcast in Belgium by both the Flemish and Walloon broadcasters. VRT broadcast the first semi-final and the final on één, while the second semi-final was broadcast on Ketnet. All shows featured commentary in Dutch by Peter Van de Veire. RTBF televised the shows on La Une with commentary in French by Jean-Louis Lahaye and Maureen Louys. The Belgian spokesperson, who announced the top 12-point score awarded by the Belgian jury during the final, was David Jeanmotte.

=== Semi-final ===
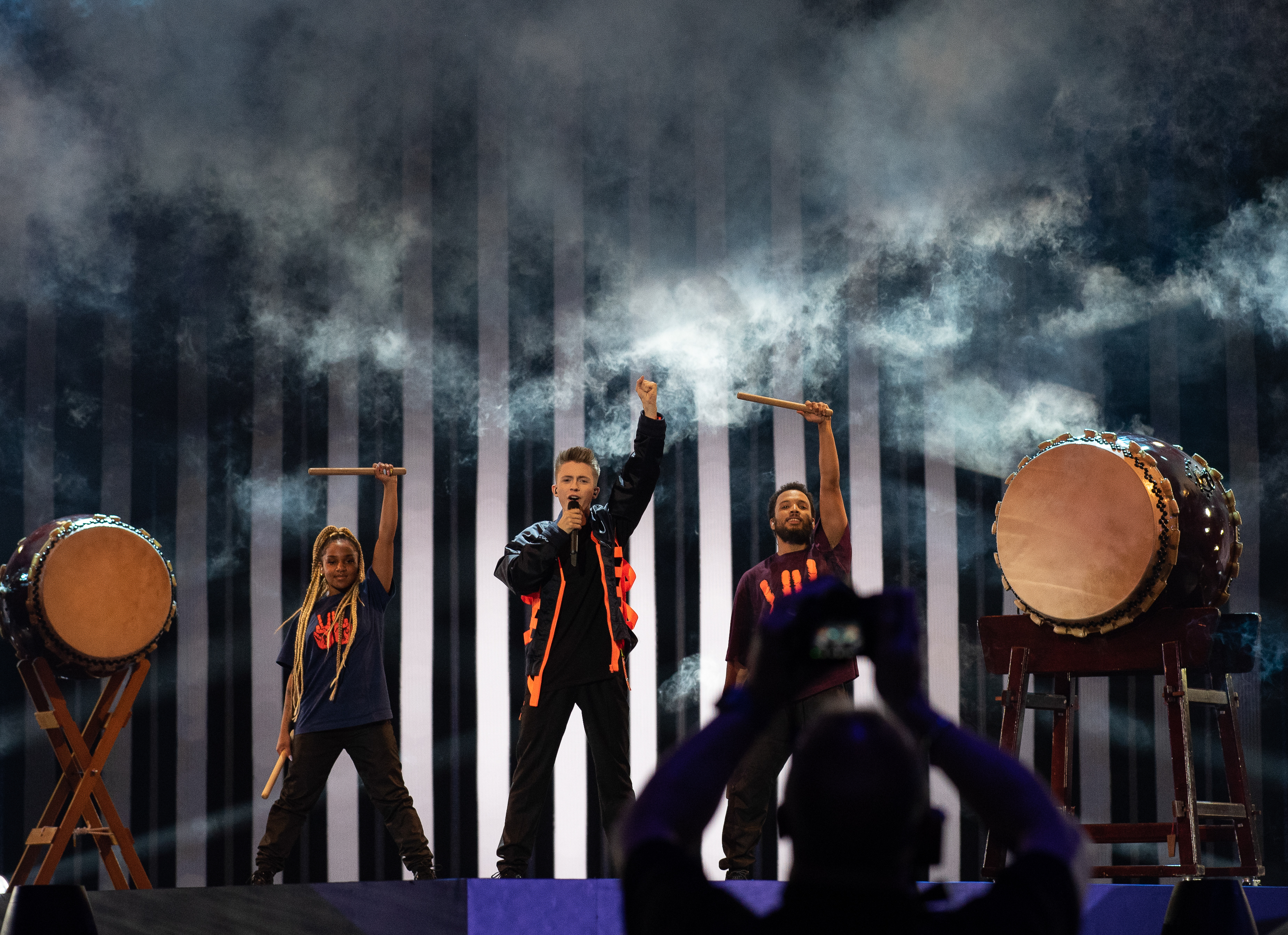
Eliot during a rehearsal before the first semi-final

Eliot took part in technical rehearsals on 5 and 9 May, followed by dress rehearsals on 13 and 14 May. This included the jury show on 13 May where the professional juries of each country watched and voted on the competing entries.

The Belgian performance featured Eliot dressed in a black outfit including trousers and jacket, the latter with red straps and a red and yellow harness underneath, and performing on stage together with one male and one female dancer who were dressed in black with red prints on the front that showed hands making the 'peace' sign. The stage also featured one big and two small head-height mounted vertical drums, of which the male and female dancer respectively banged. The stage colours were red and purple and the LED screens transitioned from a blood-red background to isometric shapes and rippling images, while the performance also featured smoke effects. The Belgian performance was directed by Jean-Jacques Marotte. The stage costumes for the performance were designed by Walter Van Beirendonck. The dancers that joined Eliot during the performance were Elya Lufwa and Mahdy Coulibaly. Two off-stage backing vocalists were also featured: Julien Michel and Renato Bennardo.

At the end of the show, Belgium was not announced among the top 10 entries in the first semi-final and therefore failed to qualify to compete in the final. It was later revealed that Belgium placed thirteenth in the semi-final, receiving a total of 70 points: 20 points from the televoting and 50 points from the juries.

=== Voting ===
Voting during the three shows involved each country awarding two sets of points from 1-8, 10 and 12: one from their professional jury and the other from televoting. Each nation's jury consisted of five music industry professionals who are citizens of the country they represent, with their names published before the contest to ensure transparency. This jury judged each entry based on: vocal capacity; the stage performance; the song's composition and originality; and the overall impression by the act. In addition, no member of a national jury was permitted to be related in any way to any of the competing acts in such a way that they cannot vote impartially and independently. The individual rankings of each jury member as well as the nation's televoting results will be released shortly after the grand final.

Below is a breakdown of points awarded to Belgium and awarded by Belgium in the first semi-final and grand final of the contest, and the breakdown of the jury voting and televoting conducted during the two shows:

==== Points awarded to Belgium ====
Points awarded to Belgium (Semi-final 1)
Score	Televote	Jury
12 points		
10 points		Cyprus; Portugal
8 points		
7 points		
6 points		Slovenia
5 points	France	Spain
4 points	Estonia; Spain	Iceland
3 points	Cyprus	Czech Republic; Israel; Poland
2 points	Portugal	Finland; Georgia; San Marino
1 point	Iceland; Poland	

==== Points awarded by Belgium ====
Points awarded by Belgium (Semi-final 1)
Score	Televote	Jury
12 points	Estonia	Australia
10 points	Australia	Iceland
8 points	Portugal	Czech Republic
7 points	Iceland	Estonia
6 points	Czech Republic	Greece
5 points	Poland	Serbia
4 points	Greece	Belarus
3 points	Slovenia	Cyprus
2 points	San Marino	Hungary
1 point	Cyprus	Portugal

Points awarded by Belgium (Final)
Score	Televote	Jury
12 points	Netherlands	Italy
10 points	France	Iceland
8 points	Italy	France
7 points	Norway	Switzerland
6 points	Spain	Netherlands
5 points	Switzerland	Czech Republic
4 points	Australia	Australia
3 points	Iceland	Greece
2 points	Sweden	Cyprus
1 point	Russia	Denmark

==== Detailed voting results ====
The following members comprised the Belgian jury:

- Hakima Darhmouch (jury chairperson) – Head of the Music and Culture department RTBF
- Alex Germys – producer and DJ
- Joëlle Morane – choreographer
- Pierre Bertinchamps – journalist
- Olivier Biron – artist manager, festival management

Detailed voting results from Belgium (Semi-final 1)
R/O	Country	Jury							Televote	
R/O	Country	H. Darhmouch	A. Germys	J. Morane	P. Bertinchamps	O. Biron	Rank	Points	Rank	Points
01	Cyprus	1	13	5	13	7	8	3	10	1
02	Montenegro	16	16	12	16	16	16		16	
03	Finland	14	14	9	8	15	13		14	
04	Poland	15	12	14	15	14	15		6	5
05	Slovenia	13	10	7	7	8	11		8	3
06	Czech Republic	2	7	4	12	1	3	8	5	6
07	Hungary	11	6	10	5	5	9	2	11	
08	Belarus	9	4	3	6	10	7	4	13	
09	Serbia	8	9	2	9	4	6	5	12	
10	Belgium									
11	Georgia	10	15	15	4	11	12		15	
12	Australia	3	8	1	2	3	1	12	2	10
13	Iceland	5	2	16	1	2	2	10	4	7
14	Estonia	4	3	6	3	13	4	7	1	12
15	Portugal	6	5	11	10	9	10	1	3	8
16	Greece	7	1	8	11	6	5	6	7	4
17	San Marino	12	11	13	14	12	14		9	2

Detailed voting results from Belgium (Final)
R/O	Country	Jury							Televote	
R/O	Country	H. Darhmouch	A. Germys	J. Morane	P. Bertinchamps	O. Biron	Rank	Points	Rank	Points
01	Malta	15	9	17	19	13	17		21	
02	Albania	26	26	25	20	26	26		12	
03	Czech Republic	5	7	4	9	4	6	5	16	
04	Germany	23	24	16	17	22	24		26	
05	Russia	18	18	20	12	25	21		10	1
06	Denmark	17	15	3	8	16	10	1	13	
07	San Marino	25	17	24	25	24	25		22	
08	North Macedonia	20	25	7	23	23	18		18	
09	Sweden	19	12	8	11	15	13		9	2
10	Slovenia	4	13	15	13	10	11		15	
11	Cyprus	6	6	13	16	8	9	2	20	
12	Netherlands	13	3	5	3	6	5	6	1	12
13	Greece	16	2	22	26	7	8	3	19	
14	Israel	22	20	12	21	19	22		17	
15	Norway	24	23	10	7	20	15		4	7
16	United Kingdom	11	10	19	18	11	16		24	
17	Iceland	3	4	26	2	2	2	10	8	3
18	Estonia	12	14	14	10	14	14		11	
19	Belarus	14	16	11	22	18	19		25	
20	Azerbaijan	8	8	23	15	12	12		14	
21	France	2	11	6	5	3	3	8	2	10
22	Italy	1	1	9	1	1	1	12	3	8
23	Serbia	21	21	21	14	17	23		23	
24	Switzerland	7	5	1	6	9	4	7	6	5
25	Australia	9	19	2	4	5	7	4	7	4
26	Spain	10	22	18	24	21	20		5	6
