= San Marino in the Eurovision Song Contest 2019 =

- Eurovision Song Contest 2019
- Participating broadcaster: San Marino RTV (SMRTV)
- Country: San Marino
- Selection process: Internal selection
- Announcement date: Artist: 21 January 2019; Song: 7 March 2019

Competing entry
- Song: "Say Na Na Na"
- Artist: Serhat
- Songwriters: Serhat; Mary Susan Applegate

Placement
- Semi-final result: Qualified (8th, 150 points)
- Final result: 19th, 77 points

Participation chronology

San Marino was represented at the Eurovision Song Contest 2019, held in Tel Aviv, Israel. The Sammarinese broadcaster San Marino RTV (SMRTV) confirmed that a second season of 1in360 would not take place to select the entry. In January 2019, they announced that Serhat had been internally selected to represent the nation in the contest with the song "Say Na Na Na", co-written by himself and Mary Susan Applegate. Serhat had previously represented San Marino in 2016 but failed to qualify for the final. To promote the entry, a music video for the song was released and Serhat made appearances at Eurovision parties in Amsterdam and Madrid in the lead up to the contest. San Marino performed last (17th) in the first semi-final of the Eurovision Song Contest 2019, held on 14 May 2019, and placed 8th, receiving 150 points. The entry qualified for the final held four days later, where the nation placed 19th with 77 points. This marked their best placing to this point and their second final qualification.

== Background ==
Prior to the 2019 contest, San Marino had participated in the Eurovision Song Contest nine times since their first entry in 2008. The nation's debut entry in the 2008 contest, "Complice" performed by Miodio, failed to qualify for the final and placed last in the semi-final it competed in. San Marino subsequently did not participate in both the 2009 and 2010 contests, citing financial difficulties. They returned in 2011 with Italian singer Senit performing "Stand By", which also failed to take the nation to the final. From 2012 to 2014, San Marino sent Valentina Monetta to the contest on three consecutive occasions, which made her the first singer to participate in three consecutive contests since Udo Jürgens, who competed in 1964, 1965 and 1966 for Austria. Monetta's entries in 2012 ("The Social Network Song") and 2013 ("Crisalide (Vola)") also failed to qualify San Marino to the final, however in 2014, she managed to bring the nation to the final for the first time with "Maybe", placing 24th. This marked their best placing to this point. The nation's next three entries, "Chain of Lights" performed by Anita Simoncini and Michele Perniola for 2015, "I Didn't Know" by Serhat for 2016 and "Spirit of the Night" by Monetta and Jimmie Wilson for 2017, did not qualify for the final. To this point, all of the nation's entries had been selected internally. For the Eurovision Song Contest 2018, SMRTV staged their first national final, entitled 1in360, and selected Jessika featuring Jenifer Brening with "Who We Are", though this also failed to qualify for the final.

== Before Eurovision ==
=== Internal selection ===
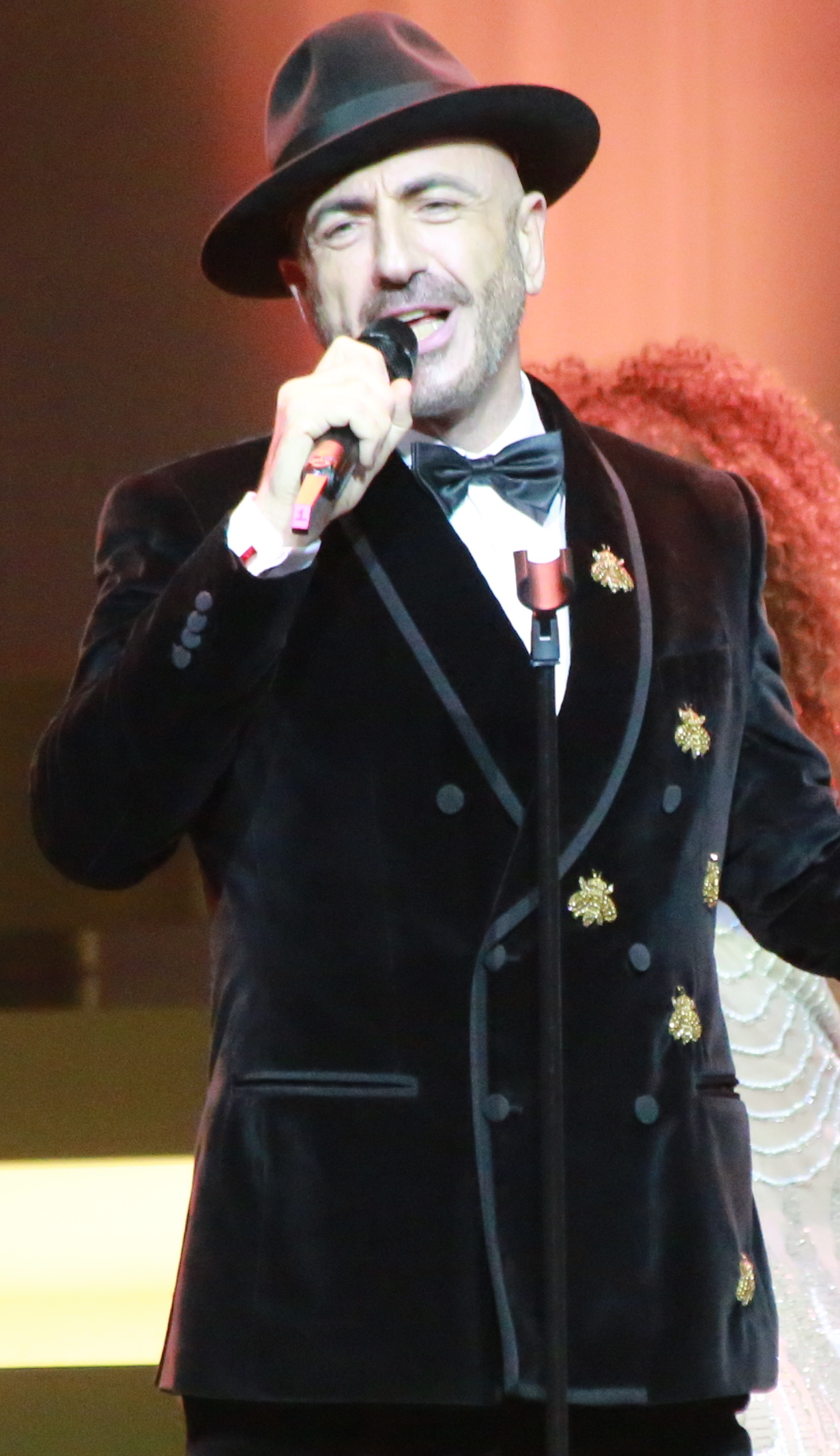
Turkish singer Serhat was again internally selected by SMRTV to represent San Marino.

On 7 November 2018, the European Broadcasting Union (EBU) included San Marino in their list of the 42 countries that had signed up to partake in the Eurovision Song Contest 2019. After initially exploring the use of 1in360 for a second year, San Marino ultimately opted to return to an internal selection process. On 21 January 2019, Radiotelevisione della Repubblica di San Marino (SMRTV) held a press conference where they announced that Serhat was internally selected to represent San Marino in the Eurovision Song Contest 2019. SMRTV Director Carlo Romeo and San Marino Head of Delegation Alessandro Capicchioni were also in attendance for the event. The Turkish singer had previously represented the nation in the 2016 contest held in Stockholm, Sweden, where he performed the song "I Didn't Know", though he failed to qualify the country for the final. In support of their decision, Romeo stated that their 10th anniversary in the contest was an important goal for them and they wanted to choose an established international artist. Serhat provided the opportunity to select a "citizen of the world" and someone with whom they could recreate a close-knit team. The announcement was followed by a second press conference the following week at Hotel Marmara in Istanbul where Serhat announced his participation to the Turkish media. His song "Say Na Na Na" was presented on 7 March at a media event held in Tel Aviv and was available for digital download along with nine remixes. The song was composed by Serhat with lyrics written in collaboration with Mary Susan Applegate.

Prior to the selection of Serhat, two artists were rumoured by the press to have been in consideration: social media influencer Jessica Alves and Russian Daryanna Kraieva. Alves spoke to the press about the potential participation, further fueling these rumours. In response, SMRTV stated that they would neither confirm nor deny the speculation, directing people to wait for the 21 January announcement.

=== Promotion ===
To promote the entry, a music video for "Say Na Na Na" was released on 7 March 2019, coinciding with the song's presentation. Directed by Thierry Vergness, it was filmed at Isiklar Studio in Istanbul and was completed by 24 February. SMRTV was looking for an international team to create the video and released interviews by production staff in their native languages extending through March. To further promote the entry, Serhat performed as one of 28 represented countries during the eleventh annual edition of Eurovision in Concert on 6 April 2019, which was held at the club AFAS Live concert hall in Amsterdam, Netherlands and hosted by Marlayne Sahupala and Cornald Maas. Later that month on 19 and 20 April, he performed during the third annual PrePartyES event, which was held at the La Riviera venue in Madrid, Spain.

== At Eurovision ==
The Eurovision Song Contest 2019 took place at Expo Tel Aviv in Tel Aviv, Israel. It consisted of two semi-finals held on 14 and 16 May, respectively, and the final on 18 May 2019. All nations with the exceptions of the host country and the "Big Five", consisting of France, Germany, Italy, Spain and the United Kingdom, were required to qualify from one of two semi-finals in order to compete for the final; the top 10 countries from each semi-final progress to the final. Semi-finalists were allocated into six different pots based on voting patterns from previous contests as determined by the contest's televoting partner Digame, with the aim of reducing the chance of neighbourly voting between countries while also increasing suspense during the voting process. On 28 January 2019, an allocation draw was held which placed each country into one of the two semi-finals and determined which half of the show they would perform in. San Marino was placed into the first semi-final, to be held on 14 May 2019, and was scheduled to perform in the second half of the show. Once all the competing songs for the 2019 contest had been released, the running order for the semi-finals was decided by the shows' producers rather than through another draw, so that similar songs were not placed next to each other. San Marino was set to perform in position 17 (last), following the entry from Greece. In San Marino, the two semi-finals and the final were broadcast on San Marino RTV and Radio San Marino with commentary by Lia Fiorio and Gigi Restivo.

=== Performances ===
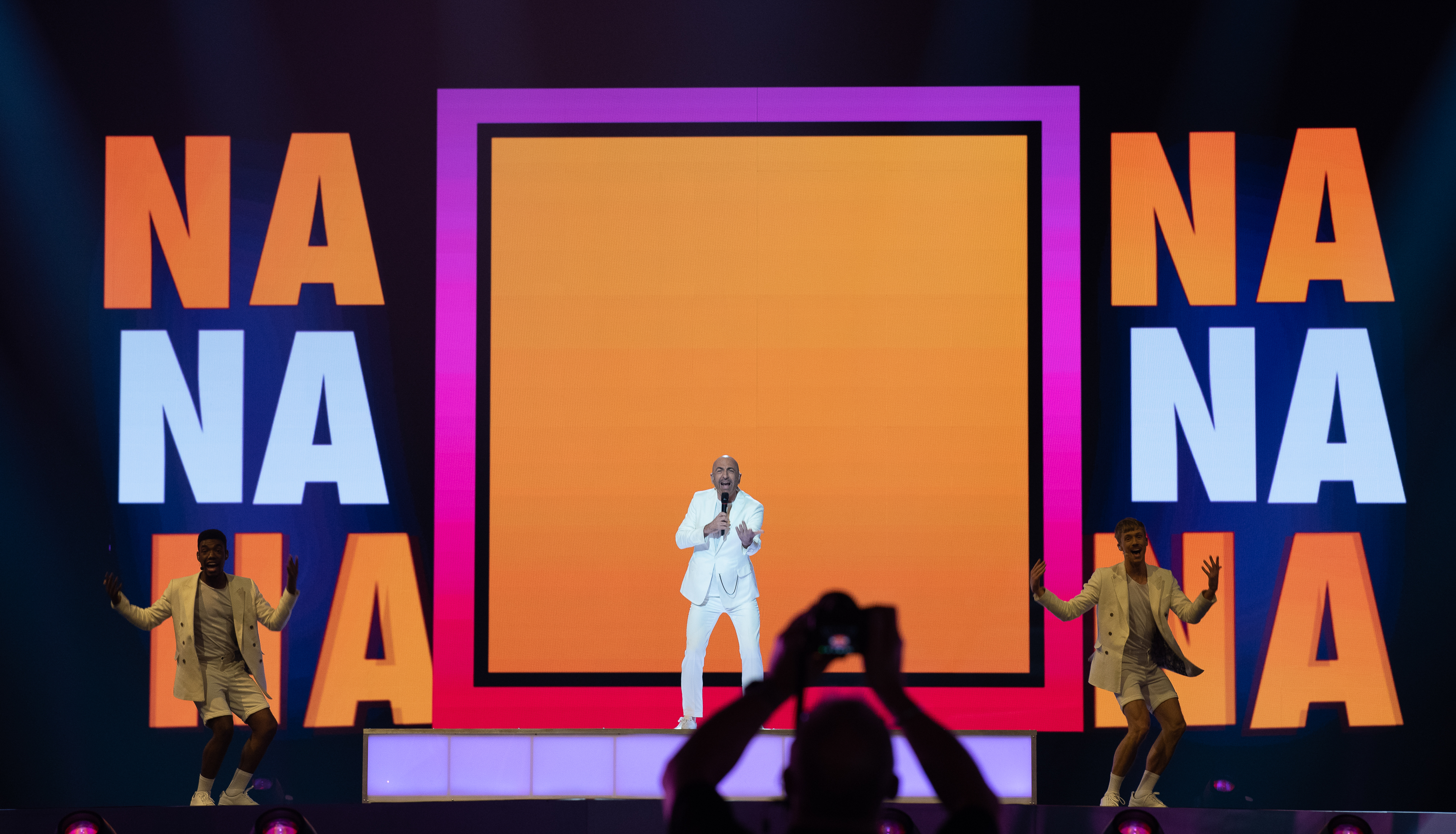
Serhat performing "Say Na Na Na" during a dress rehearsal.

Serhat performed "Say Na Na Na" during the jury show on 13 May where the professional juries of each country watched and voted on the competing entries, an event that determines half of the final vote. The following night, he performed the song last in the first semi-final, following the entry from Greece. The performance featured Serhat surrounded by two male dancers and three female backing vocalists, all dressed in white. Serhat described it as being very modern and reminiscent of the music video, though some adjustments had to be made such as limiting the number of people on stage to six. These performances were staged by creative director Nick Marianos, who had previously served in that role for past Greek Eurovision entrants Sakis Rouvas and Eleftheria Eleftheriou. At the end of the night, San Marino was announced as one of the ten countries to have qualified for the final, making it only the second time they reached the final and their first qualification since 2014. It was later revealed that San Marino placed eighth in the semi-final, receiving a total of 150 points: 124 points from the televoting and 26 points from the juries.

After the show, Serhat appeared at a press conference with the other nine finalists to draw which half of the final he would participate in. San Marino was drawn to perform in the first half of the final. At the final, held on 18 May, Serhat performed "Say Na Na Na" seventh, following the entry from Denmark and preceding the entry from North Macedonia. At the close of voting, the nation finished 19th with 77 points, giving San Marino their best result to this point.

=== Voting ===
Voting during the three shows involved each country awarding two sets of points from 1–8, 10 and 12: one from their expert jury and the other from televoting. Each nation's jury consisted of five music industry professionals who are citizens of the country they represent. The jury judged each entry based on vocal capacity, the stage performance, the song's composition and originality and the overall impression by the act. No member of a national jury was permitted to be connected in any way to any of the competing acts in such a way that they cannot vote impartially and independently. Monica Fabbri served as the Sammarinese spokesperson, who announced the votes awarded by the Sammarinese jury during the final. Below is a breakdown of points awarded to San Marino and awarded by San Marino in both the first semi-final and the final of the contest, and the breakdown of the jury voting and televoting conducted during the two shows.

==== Points awarded to San Marino ====
Points awarded to San Marino (Semi-final 1)
Score	Televote	Jury
12 points	Czech Republic; Georgia; Hungary	
10 points	Estonia; Montenegro	Montenegro
8 points	Cyprus; Spain	
7 points	Belarus	
6 points	Australia; Poland; Portugal	
5 points	Israel; Serbia	
4 points	Finland; Greece; Iceland	
3 points	Slovenia	Belarus; Estonia; Greece
2 points	Belgium	Cyprus; Iceland; Israel
1 point		Australia

Points awarded to San Marino (Final)
Score	Televote	Jury
12 points		
10 points	Albania; Azerbaijan; Georgia	
8 points	Moldova; Montenegro; North Macedonia	
7 points		
6 points	Hungary	Greece
5 points		Russia
4 points		
3 points		
2 points	Croatia	
1 point	Belarus; Iceland; Serbia	Malta

==== Points awarded by San Marino ====
Points awarded by San Marino (Semi-final 1)
Score	Aggregated televote	Jury
12 points	Greece	Greece
10 points	Cyprus	Montenegro
8 points	Estonia	Cyprus
7 points	Iceland	Iceland
6 points	Australia	Australia
5 points	Poland	Serbia
4 points	Czech Republic	Slovenia
3 points	Slovenia	Czech Republic
2 points	Serbia	Belgium
1 point	Georgia	Belarus

Points awarded by San Marino (Final)
Score	Aggregated televote	Jury
12 points	Russia	Italy
10 points	Greece	Russia
8 points	Italy	Greece
7 points	Cyprus	Albania
6 points	Netherlands	Iceland
5 points	Switzerland	Cyprus
4 points	Azerbaijan	Azerbaijan
3 points	Norway	Netherlands
2 points	Iceland	Switzerland
1 point	Israel	North Macedonia

==== Detailed voting results ====
The following members comprised the Sammarinese jury:

- Paolo Rondelli (jury chairperson) – cultural and communication manager
- Danilo Berardi – Head of Production and Head of Live events services San Marino RTV
- Sabrina Minguzzi – choreographer, teacher, dancer
- Ella Gasperoni – radio DJ
- Marilia Reffi – cultural promoter

Detailed voting results from San Marino (Semi-final 1)
R/O	Country	Jury							Aggregated televote	
R/O	Country	P. Rondelli	D. Berardi	S. Minguzzi	E. Gasperoni	M. Reffi	Rank	Points	Rank	Points
01	Cyprus	2	7	4	3	2	3	8	2	10
02	Montenegro	3	4	2	1	1	2	10	16	
03	Finland	15	16	16	10	15	16		15	
04	Poland	13	15	14	11	9	14		6	5
05	Slovenia	11	2	15	9	8	7	4	8	3
06	Czech Republic	6	6	8	8	11	8	3	7	4
07	Hungary	10	11	9	7	7	11		13	
08	Belarus	14	14	11	5	5	10	1	11	
09	Serbia	7	9	5	13	4	6	5	9	2
10	Belgium	5	12	3	16	13	9	2	14	
11	Georgia	9	10	7	12	14	12		10	1
12	Australia	4	3	10	14	10	5	6	5	6
13	Iceland	8	5	6	4	6	4	7	4	7
14	Estonia	12	13	12	6	16	13		3	8
15	Portugal	16	8	13	15	12	15		12	
16	Greece	1	1	1	2	3	1	12	1	12
17	San Marino									

Detailed voting results from San Marino (Final)
R/O	Country	Jury							Aggregated televote	
R/O	Country	P. Rondelli	D. Berardi	S. Minguzzi	E. Gasperoni	M. Reffi	Rank	Points	Rank	Points
01	Malta	14	22	18	15	16	22		22	
02	Albania	8	6	3	4	6	4	7	16	
03	Czech Republic	12	21	19	9	11	16		20	
04	Germany	22	24	21	16	25	23		25	
05	Russia	3	1	2	2	2	2	10	1	12
06	Denmark	23	25	20	25	17	25		19	
07	San Marino									
08	North Macedonia	11	4	8	24	14	10	1	15	
09	Sweden	15	9	14	6	18	13		12	
10	Slovenia	10	20	16	23	3	12		21	
11	Cyprus	9	7	5	8	13	6	5	4	7
12	Netherlands	2	10	10	22	19	8	3	5	6
13	Greece	1	2	4	3	5	3	8	2	10
14	Israel	19	15	17	11	21	20		10	1
15	Norway	20	19	22	10	22	21		8	3
16	United Kingdom	17	16	24	14	12	19		24	
17	Iceland	7	12	15	7	4	5	6	9	2
18	Estonia	25	23	23	21	8	18		17	
19	Belarus	21	18	13	5	20	14		23	
20	Azerbaijan	5	8	6	20	10	7	4	7	4
21	France	24	17	25	19	23	24		14	
22	Italy	4	3	1	1	1	1	12	3	8
23	Serbia	16	14	11	18	24	17		18	
24	Switzerland	13	5	9	17	7	9	2	6	5
25	Australia	18	13	7	13	15	15		11	
26	Spain	6	11	12	12	9	11		13	
