= Cyprus in the Eurovision Song Contest 2019 =

- Eurovision Song Contest 2019
- Participating broadcaster: Cyprus Broadcasting Corporation (CyBC)
- Country: Cyprus
- Selection process: Internal selection
- Announcement date: 21 December 2018

Competing entry
- Song: "Replay"
- Artist: Tamta
- Songwriters: Alex Papaconstantinou; Geraldo Sandell; Viktor Svensson; Albin Nedler; Kristoffer Fogelmark

Placement
- Semi-final result: Qualified (9th, 149 points)
- Final result: 13th, 109 points

Participation chronology

Cyprus was represented at the Eurovision Song Contest 2019 with the song "Replay", written by Alex Papaconstantinou, Teddy Sky, Viktor Svensson, Albin Nedler, and Kristoffer Fogelmark, and performed by Tamta. The Cypriot participating broadcaster, Cyprus Broadcasting Corporation (CyBC), internally selected its entry for the contest. Tamta had attempted to represent Greece in 2007 with the song "With Love" but placed third in the Greek national final.

== Background ==
Prior to the 2019 contest, the Cyprus Broadcasting Corporation (CyBC) had participated in the Eurovision Song Contest representing Cyprus thirty-five times since its debut in 1981. Its best placing was at the 2018 contest where "Fuego" by Eleni Foureira placed second. Its least successful result was in 1986 when it placed last with the song "Tora zo" by Elpida, receiving only four points in total. However, its worst finish in terms of points received was when it placed second to last in 1999 with "Tha 'nai erotas" by Marlain Angelidou, receiving only two points. After returning to the contest in 2015 following their one-year absence due to the 2012–13 Cypriot financial crisis and the broadcaster's budget restrictions, it has managed to qualify for the grand final in all of the contests in which it has participated.

As part of its duties as participating broadcaster, CyBC organises the selection of its entry in the Eurovision Song Contest and broadcasts the event in the country. The broadcaster confirmed its intentions to participate at the 2019 contest on 13 June 2018. CyBC has used various methods to select its entry in the past, such as internal selections and televised national finals to choose the performer, song or both to compete at Eurovision. In 2015, the broadcaster organised the national final Eurovision Song Project, which featured 54 songs competing in a nine-week-long process resulting in the selection of the entry through the combination of public televoting and the votes from an expert jury. However, since 2016, it has opted to select the artist and song internally.

== Before Eurovision ==
=== Internal selection ===
On 21 December 2018, CyBC announced that Greek-Georgian singer Tamta would represent Cyprus with the song "Replay", which would be presented in February 2019. Tamta had attempted to represent Greece in 2007 with the song "With Love" but placed third in the Greek national final. She also approached Greek broadcaster, Hellenic Broadcasting Corporation (ERT), to represent Greece since 2010, but ERT declined the offer. She was also rumored to be the Cypriot representative for 2018, but later declined because of prior commitments. CyBC, in collaboration with label Minos-EMI/Universal, initially planned to host the show Eurovision Cocktail Party on 5 March for the presentation of the Cypriot entry, however, it was instead presented during a newscast on CyBC on 5 March. Nevertheless, Eurovision Cocktail Party was still aired, but later on 2 April 2019.

== At Eurovision ==
The Eurovision Song Contest 2019 took place at Expo Tel Aviv in Tel Aviv, Israel. It consisted of two semi-finals held on 14 and 16 May, respectively, and the grand final on 18 May 2019. According to Eurovision rules, all nations with the exceptions of the host country and the "Big Five", consisting of France, Germany, Italy, Spain, and the United Kingdom, are required to qualify from one of two semi-finals in order to compete for the final; the top ten countries from each semi-final progress to the final. The European Broadcasting Union (EBU) split up the competing countries into six different pots based on voting patterns from previous contests, with countries with favourable voting histories put into the same pot. On 28 January 2019, a special allocation draw was held which placed each country into one of the two semi-finals, as well as which half of the show they would perform in. Cyprus was placed into the first semi-final, to be held on 14 May 2019, and was scheduled to perform in the first half of the show.

Once all the competing songs for the 2019 contest had been released, the running order for the semi-finals was decided by the shows' producers rather than through another draw, so that similar songs were not placed next to each other. Cyprus was set to perform in position 1, preceding the entry from Montenegro.

=== Semi-final ===
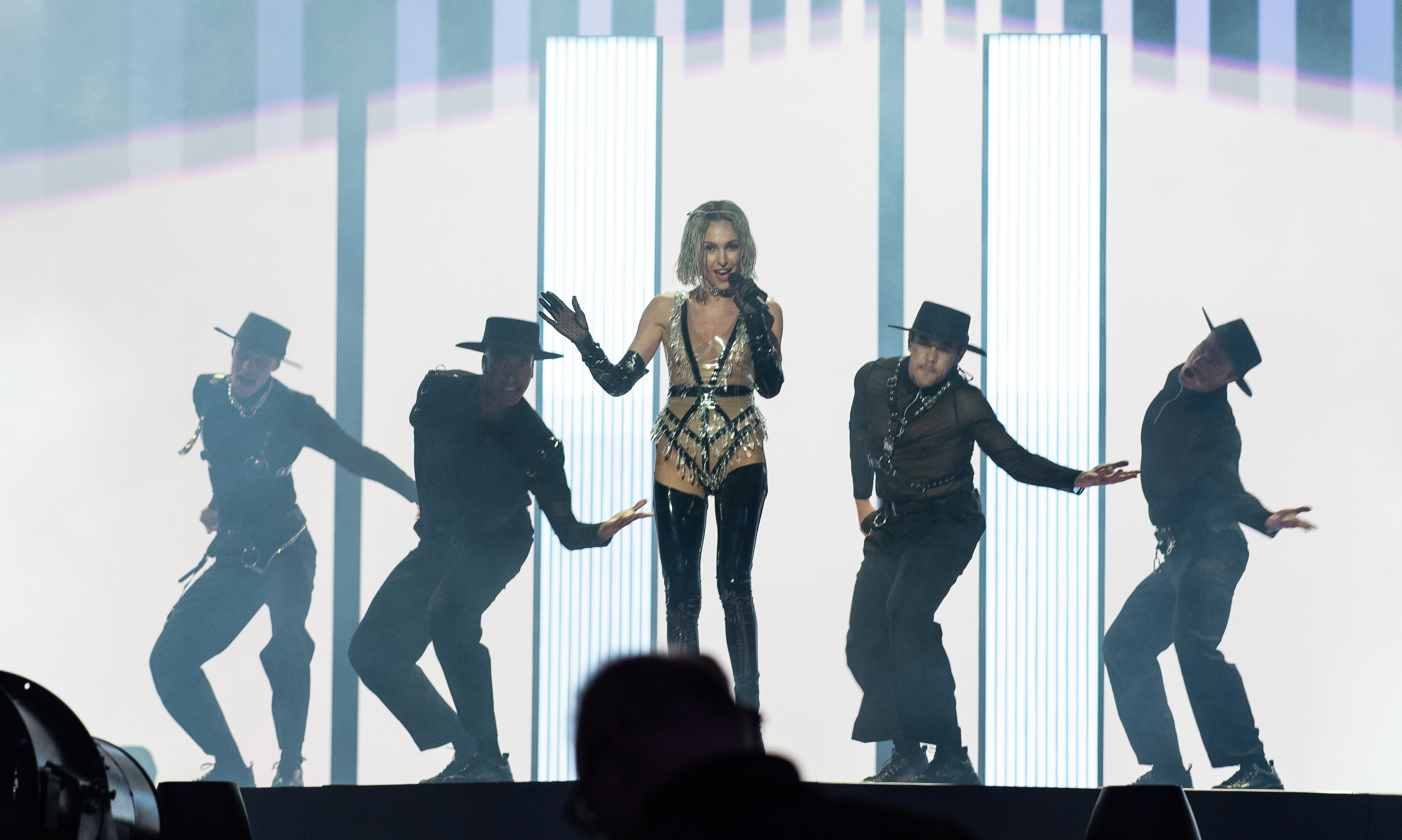
Tamta performing "Replay" in the semi-final on 14 May 2019.

Cyprus opened the first semi-final, preceding Montenegro. At the end of the show, they were announced as one of the ten countries who qualified for the final. It was later revealed that Cyprus placed ninth in the semi-final, receiving a total of 149 points: 54 points from the televoting and 95 points from the juries.

=== Voting ===
Voting during the three shows involved each country awarding two sets of points from 1-8, 10 and 12: one from their professional jury and the other from televoting. Each participating broadcaster assembled a jury consisted of five music industry professionals who were citizens of the country they represent, with their names published before the contest to ensure transparency. This jury judged each entry based on: vocal capacity; the stage performance; the song's composition and originality; and the overall impression by the act. In addition, no member of a national jury was permitted to be related in any way to any of the competing acts in such a way that they cannot vote impartially and independently. The individual rankings of each jury member as well as the nation's televoting results will be released shortly after the grand final.

The audience audibly booed Cyprus awarding Greece the maximum twelve points.

==== Points awarded to Cyprus ====
Points awarded to Cyprus (Semi-final 1)
Score	Televote	Jury
12 points	Greece	Greece
10 points	Georgia; San Marino	Czech Republic
8 points	Israel	Estonia; Montenegro; San Marino; Serbia
7 points		Slovenia
6 points		France; Spain
5 points		Georgia
4 points	Montenegro	Belarus; Israel; Poland
3 points	Australia; Hungary	Belgium
2 points		
1 point	Belgium; Czech Republic; Portugal; Spain	Iceland; Portugal

Points awarded to Cyprus (Final)
Score	Televote	Jury
12 points	Georgia; Greece	Greece
10 points		
8 points		Belarus; Russia
7 points	San Marino	Albania; Sweden
6 points		Georgia; Malta
5 points		Montenegro; San Marino; Spain
4 points		
3 points		Azerbaijan
2 points		Belgium
1 point	United Kingdom	Netherlands; North Macedonia; Norway

==== Points awarded by Cyprus ====
Points awarded by Cyprus (Semi-final 1)
Score	Televote	Jury
12 points	Greece	Greece
10 points	Georgia	Belgium
8 points	San Marino	Iceland
7 points	Estonia	Georgia
6 points	Belarus	Serbia
5 points	Serbia	Slovenia
4 points	Australia	Montenegro
3 points	Belgium	Portugal
2 points	Czech Republic	San Marino
1 point	Iceland	Czech Republic

Points awarded by Cyprus (Final)
Score	Televote	Jury
12 points	Greece	Greece
10 points	Russia	Russia
8 points	Italy	Italy
7 points	Switzerland	Sweden
6 points	Netherlands	Azerbaijan
5 points	Israel	Netherlands
4 points	Spain	France
3 points	France	Malta
2 points	Australia	Albania
1 point	Norway	Switzerland

==== Detailed voting results ====
The following members composed the Cypriot jury:

- Despo Karpi (jury chairperson) – senior officer CyBC
- Christos Panayioti Pieri (DJ Chris P) – radio producer, DJ
- Lisa Tsangaridou – ballet teacher, choreographer
- Stefanos Andreas Arestis – musician
- Andrie Michael Daniel – journalist, editor in chief

Detailed voting results from Cyprus (Semi-final 1)
R/O	Country	Jury							Televote	
R/O	Country	DJ Chris P	D. Karpi	L. Tsangaridou	S.A. Arestis	A.M. Daniel	Rank	Points	Rank	Points
01	Cyprus									
02	Montenegro	4	6	11	12	5	7	4	16	
03	Finland	6	13	14	8	14	13		15	
04	Poland	5	14	16	15	13	15		12	
05	Slovenia	3	11	3	10	12	6	5	13	
06	Czech Republic	11	3	10	7	10	10	1	9	2
07	Hungary	15	12	7	16	9	14		14	
08	Belarus	13	16	15	5	16	16		5	6
09	Serbia	12	7	5	6	4	5	6	6	5
10	Belgium	2	8	13	4	3	2	10	8	3
11	Georgia	14	4	9	3	7	4	7	2	10
12	Australia	9	2	12	11	15	11		7	4
13	Iceland	16	15	6	2	2	3	8	10	1
14	Estonia	8	10	4	9	11	12		4	7
15	Portugal	10	9	2	13	8	8	3	11	
16	Greece	1	1	1	1	1	1	12	1	12
17	San Marino	7	5	8	14	6	9	2	3	8

Detailed voting results from Cyprus (Final)
R/O	Country	Jury							Televote	
R/O	Country	DJ Chris P	D. Karpi	L. Tsangaridou	S.A. Arestis	A.M. Daniel	Rank	Points	Rank	Points
01	Malta	8	4	8	10	15	8	3	14	
02	Albania	14	14	6	16	3	9	2	23	
03	Czech Republic	16	19	25	19	16	21		16	
04	Germany	21	24	15	24	22	25		25	
05	Russia	1	2	4	1	2	2	10	2	10
06	Denmark	22	23	14	20	21	22		20	
07	San Marino	7	5	10	25	14	12		22	
08	North Macedonia	9	6	11	15	13	13		21	
09	Sweden	3	10	3	11	9	4	7	11	
10	Slovenia	24	21	20	17	17	23		19	
11	Cyprus									
12	Netherlands	10	11	12	4	5	6	5	5	6
13	Greece	2	1	2	2	1	1	12	1	12
14	Israel	25	8	23	22	25	19		6	5
15	Norway	18	17	21	6	24	17		10	1
16	United Kingdom	20	25	13	18	23	20		24	
17	Iceland	13	20	18	3	7	11		12	
18	Estonia	17	18	24	23	19	24		13	
19	Belarus	19	22	22	8	20	18		15	
20	Azerbaijan	6	7	5	9	6	5	6	17	
21	France	23	3	9	5	18	7	4	8	3
22	Italy	4	9	1	14	12	3	8	3	8
23	Serbia	12	15	19	12	8	16		18	
24	Switzerland	11	16	7	13	4	10	1	4	7
25	Australia	15	13	16	7	10	15		9	2
26	Spain	5	12	17	21	11	14		7	4
