= Vanja Radovanović =

Montenegrin singer and songwriter (born 1982)

Vanja Radovanović Вања Радовановић
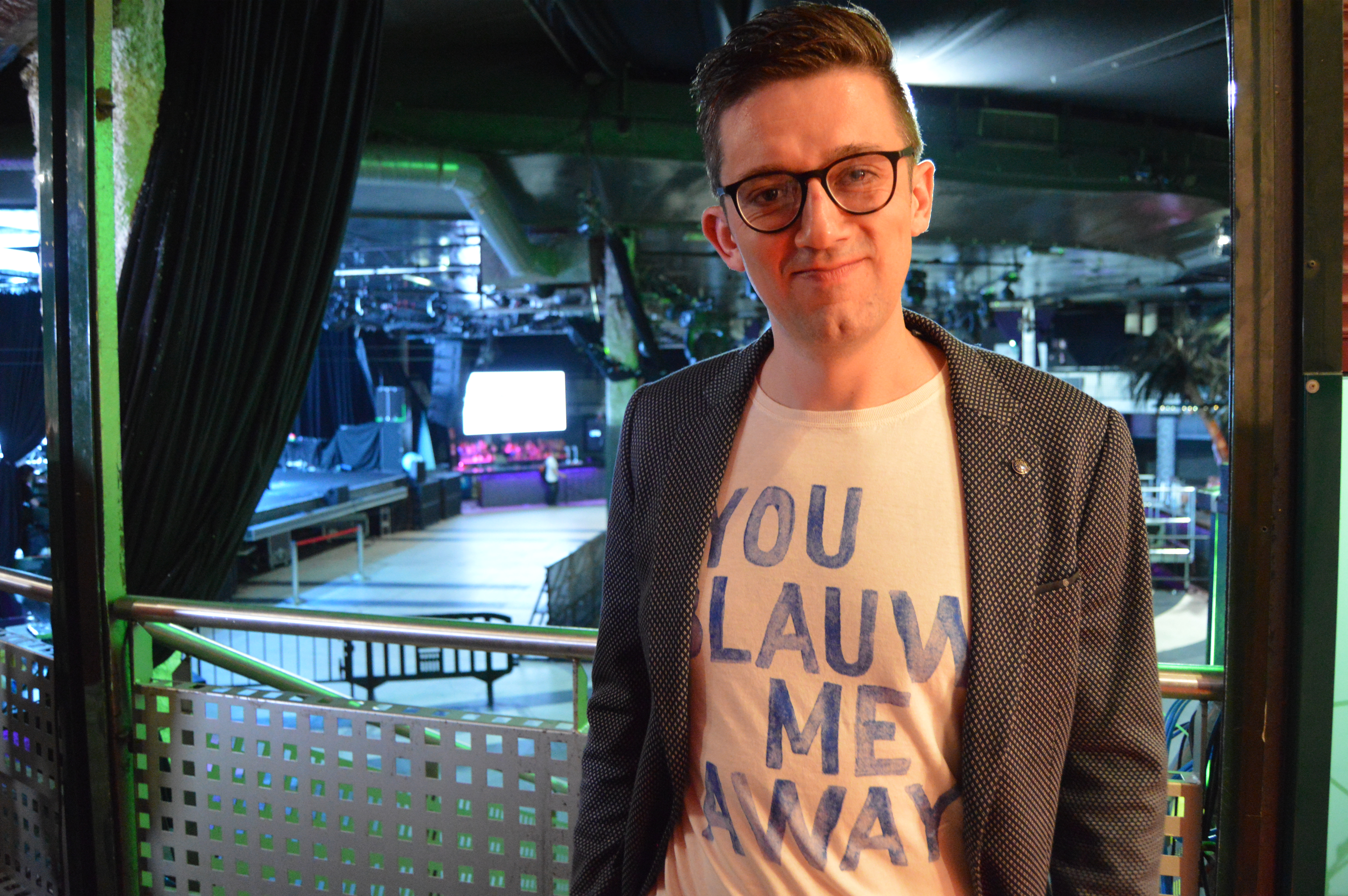

Background information
- Born: 28 October 1982 (age 43); Belgrade, SR Serbia, SFR Yugoslavia
- Origin: Nikšić, Montenegro
- Genres: Pop; blues; rock; Balkan ballad
- Occupations: Singer; songwriter
- Instruments: Vocals; guitar
- Years active: 2004–present

Vanja Radovanović (Montenegrin: Вања Радовановић; born 28 October 1982) is a Montenegrin singer and songwriter. He represented Montenegro in the Eurovision Song Contest 2018 in Lisbon, Portugal, with the song "Inje", however failed to make the final, coming 16th place in Semi-final 2.

== Personal life ==
He is the nephew of former singer Miladin Šobić.

Preceded by Slavko Kalezić with "Space"	Montenegro in the Eurovision Song Contest; 2018	Succeeded by D-moll with "Heaven"
