= Greece in the Eurovision Song Contest 2019 =

- Eurovision Song Contest 2019
- Participating broadcaster: Hellenic Broadcasting Corporation (ERT)
- Country: Greece
- Selection process: Internal selection
- Announcement date: Artist: 14 February 2019; Song: 6 March 2019

Competing entry
- Song: "Better Love"
- Artist: Katerine Duska
- Songwriters: Katerine Duska; Leon of Athens; David Sneddon; Phil Cook

Placement
- Semi-final result: Qualified (5th, 185 points)
- Final result: 21st, 74 points

Participation chronology

Greece was represented at the Eurovision Song Contest 2019 with the song "Better Love", written by Katerine Duska, Leon of Athens, David Sneddon, and Phil Cook, and performed by Duska herself. The Greek participating broadcaster, the Hellenic Broadcasting Corporation (ERT), internally selected its entry for the contest. Duska was announced as the Greek representative on 14 February 2019, while her song "Better Love" was presented on 6 March 2019.

To promote the entry, a music video for the song was created, and Duska appeared at events in Amsterdam and Madrid. Greece was drawn to compete in the first semi-final of the Eurovision Song Contest which took place on 14 May 2019. Performing during the show in position 16, "Better Love" was announced among the top 10 entries of the first semi-final and therefore qualified to compete in the final on 18 May. It was later revealed that Greece placed fifth out of the 17 participating countries in the semi-final with 185 points. In the final, Greece performed in position 13 and placed twenty-first out of the 26 participating countries, scoring 74 points.

== Background ==
Prior to the 2019 contest, Greece had participated in the Eurovision Song Contest 39 times since its debut in 1974. To this point, they won the contest once, in 2005 with the song "My Number One" performed by Helena Paparizou. Following the introduction of semi-finals for the 2004 contest, Greece managed to qualify for the final with each of their entries for several years. Between 2004 and 2013, the nation achieved nine top ten placements in the final. "Utopian Land" by Argo in 2016, was the nation's first entry to not qualify to the final. Its 16th-place finish marked Greece's worst placing at the contest and led to their absence from the final for the first time since 2000, when they did not send an entry. In 2018, Greece failed to qualify for the second time with "Oniro mou" by Yianna Terzi finishing 14th in the semi-final.

As part of its duties as participating broadcaster, the Hellenic Broadcasting Corporation (ERT) organises the selection of its entry in the Eurovision Song Contest and broadcasts the event in the country. ERT's predecessor, the National Radio Television Foundation (EIRT), debuted in the contest in 1974 and then ERT participated from 1975 until 2013, when it was shut down by a government directive and replaced firstly with the interim Dimosia Tileorasi (DT) and then later by the New Hellenic Radio, Internet and Television (NERIT) broadcaster. Following the victory of the Syriza party at the January 2015 Greek legislative election, the Hellenic Parliament renamed NERIT to ERT that June. The Greek broadcaster has used various methods to select its entry in the past, such as internal selections and televised national finals to choose the performer, song or both to compete at Eurovision. The Greek artist and song in 2018 were selected via an internal selection.

== Before Eurovision ==
=== Internal selection ===
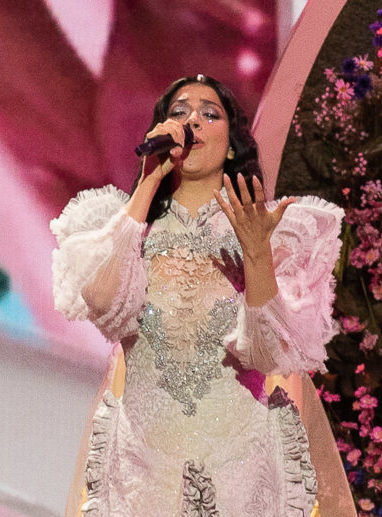
Katerine Duska was selected internally by the Hellenic Broadcasting Corporation to represent Greece in the Eurovision Song Contest 2019.

On 3 January 2019, the ERT announced that they would be selecting their act and song internally. An eight-member artistic committee was involved with the selection of the entrant and consisted of chairman, music composer and ERT board member Dimitris Papadimitriou; journalist Fotis Apergis; ERT Director of International Relations Maria Koufopoulou; ERT Head of European and International Affairs Sofia Dranidou; and music producers Petros Adam and Yiannis Petridis. Their selection of Greek-Canadian singer Katerine Duska as the Greek representative for the 2019 contest was confirmed by ERT on 14 February. Her song "Better Love" was then presented on 6 March through a special event held at the Athens Concert Hall. The official music video, filmed in Athens and directed by Efi Gousi, was also screened at the event. "Better Love" was written by Duska herself together with Leon of Athens, David Sneddon and Phil Cook. In regards to the song, Duska stated: "I wanted to write a song that would sound like an invitation, feel like an embrace. A tender song with a fighting spirit about a word we profusely use, but rarely actually mean. It really is the way to love, whomever you love."

=== Promotion ===
In addition to releasing a music video for "Better Love", Duska made several appearances across Europe to specifically promote the song as the Greek Eurovision entry. On 6 April, Duska performed during the Eurovision in Concert event which was held at the AFAS Live venue in Amsterdam and hosted by Cornald Maas and Marlayne. She also performed during the Eurovision Pre-Party Madrid event on 21 April which was held at the Sala La Riviera venue in Madrid and hosted by Tony Aguilar and Julia Varela.

== At Eurovision ==
The Eurovision Song Contest 2019 took place at Expo Tel Aviv in Tel Aviv, Israel. It consisted of two semi-finals held on 14 and 16 May, respectively, and the final on 18 May 2019. According to Eurovision rules, all nations with the exceptions of the host country and the "Big Five" (France, Germany, Italy, Spain and the United Kingdom) are required to qualify from one of two semi-finals in order to compete for the final; the top ten countries from each semi-final progress to the final. The European Broadcasting Union (EBU) split up the competing countries into six different pots based on voting patterns from previous contests, with countries with favourable voting histories put into the same pot. On 28 January 2019, a special allocation draw was held which placed each country into one of the two semi-finals, as well as which half of the show they would perform in. Greece was placed into the first semi-final, held on 14 May 2019, and was scheduled to perform in the second half of the show. Once all the competing songs for the 2019 contest had been released, the running order for the semi-finals was decided by the shows' producers rather than through another draw, so that similar songs were not placed next to each other. Greece was set to perform in position 16, following the entry from Portugal and before the entry from San Marino. The two semi-finals and the final were televised in Greece on ERT2 and ERT HD with commentary by Maria Kozakou and Giorgos Kapoutzidis. The first semi-final and the final were also broadcast via radio on Voice of Greece and Second Programme.

=== Performances ===
Katerine Duska took part in technical rehearsals on 5 and 10 May, followed by dress rehearsals on 13 and 14 May. This included the jury show on 13 May, where the professional juries of each country watched and voted on the competing entries in the first semi-final. The performance was choreographed by Efi Gousi, who also directed the music video of "Better Love". Appearing on stage with Duska were dancers Dimitra Vlachou and Fania Grigoriou and backing vocalists Eleni Pozantzidou, Erasmia Markidi and Evgenia Liakou. Duska wore a white dress, and her hair was braided in a line of pearls. The stage presentation featured an ancient Greek fountain-like prop, which was later turned to reveal a wall of flowers. Two of the backing performers held swords in each of their hands and performed contemporary dance moves and synchronised ballet, while the other three backing performers interacted with the staging by lying down on the stage floor. The LED screens projected a lotus background. At the end of the show, Greece was announced as having finished in the top 10 and subsequently qualifying for the final. It was later revealed that Greece placed fifth in the semi-final, receiving a total of 185 points: 54 points from the televoting and 131 points from the juries.

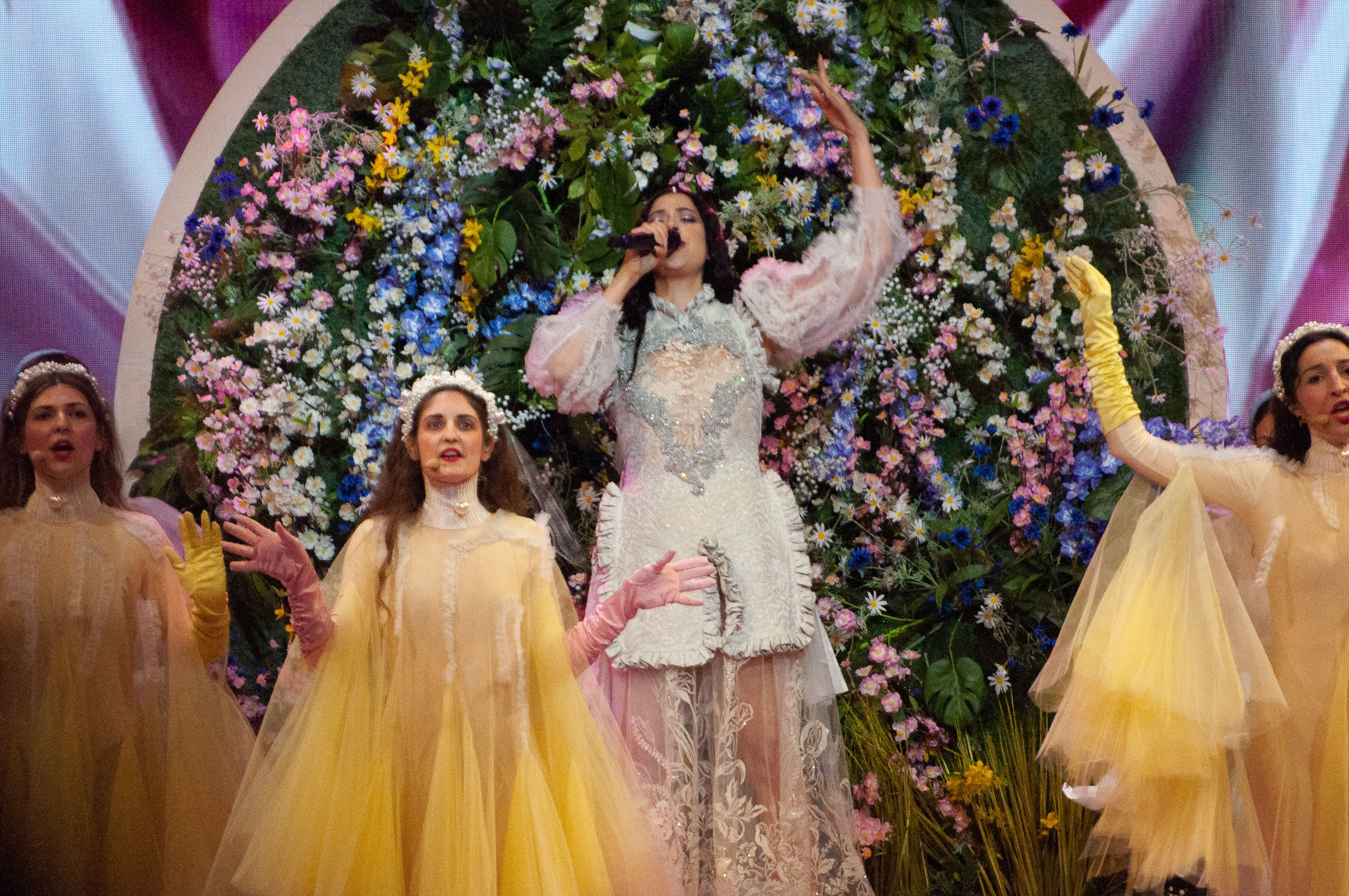
Katerine Duska during a rehearsal before the final

Shortly after the first semi-final, a winners' press conference was held for the ten qualifying countries. As part of this press conference, the qualifying artists took part in a draw to determine in which half of the final they would subsequently participate. This draw was done in the order the countries were announced during the semi-final. Greece was drawn to compete in the second half. Following this draw, the shows' producers decided upon the running order of the final, as they had done for the semi-finals. Greece was subsequently placed to perform in position 13, following the entry from the Netherlands and before the entry from Israel. Duska once again took part in dress rehearsals on 17 and 18 May before the final, including the jury final where the professional juries cast their final votes before the live show. At the 18 May final, Greece placed 21st, scoring 74 points: 24 points from the televoting and 50 points from the juries. Following the contest, ERT reported high viewership of the final, with a 50.2 percent share of television viewers on a combination of their ERT2 and ERT HD broadcasts and 4,125,544 viewers watching for at least one minute.

=== Voting ===
Voting during the three shows involved each country awarding two sets of points from 1–8, 10 and 12: one from their professional jury and the other from televoting. Each nation's jury consisted of five music industry professionals who are citizens of the country they represent, with their names published before the contest to ensure transparency. This jury judged each entry based on vocal capacity, stage performance, the song's composition and originality, and the overall impression by the act. In addition, no member of a national jury was permitted to be related in any way to any of the competing acts in such a way that they cannot vote impartially and independently. The individual rankings of each jury member, as well as the nation's televoting results, were released shortly after the final. The Greek spokesperson, who announced the top 12-point score awarded by the Greek jury during the final, was heavy metal guitarist Gus G. Below is a breakdown of points awarded to Greece and awarded by Greece in the first semi-final and final of the contest, and the breakdown of the jury voting and televoting conducted during the two shows:

==== Points awarded to Greece ====
Points awarded to Greece (Semi-final 1)
Score	Televote	Jury
12 points	Cyprus; San Marino	Cyprus; Israel; Montenegro; San Marino
10 points		Georgia; Slovenia; Spain
8 points	Australia	Iceland
7 points		Australia; Finland
6 points		Belgium
5 points	Portugal	Belarus; Czech Republic; France
4 points	Belgium; Georgia	Estonia; Hungary
3 points	France	
2 points	Serbia; Spain	Serbia
1 point	Hungary; Montenegro	

Points awarded to Greece (Final)
Score	Televote	Jury
12 points	Cyprus	Cyprus
10 points	San Marino	Russia
8 points		San Marino
7 points		
6 points		Azerbaijan
5 points		
4 points		Albania; Malta
3 points		Belarus; Belgium
2 points	Albania	
1 point		

==== Points awarded by Greece ====
Points awarded by Greece (Semi-final 1)
Score	Televote	Jury
12 points	Cyprus	Cyprus
10 points	Georgia	Australia
8 points	Australia	Czech Republic
7 points	Iceland	Belarus
6 points	Serbia	Serbia
5 points	Slovenia	Montenegro
4 points	San Marino	Finland
3 points	Estonia	San Marino
2 points	Belarus	Iceland
1 point	Czech Republic	Slovenia

Points awarded by Greece (Final)
Score	Televote	Jury
12 points	Cyprus	Cyprus
10 points	Italy	Russia
8 points	Russia	Azerbaijan
7 points	Switzerland	Italy
6 points	Netherlands	San Marino
5 points	Albania	Malta
4 points	Spain	Slovenia
3 points	Australia	Albania
2 points	Iceland	Australia
1 point	France	North Macedonia

==== Detailed voting results ====
The following members comprised the Greek jury:

- Nikolaos Nikolakopoulos (Nikos; jury chairperson) – programme director, radio station
- Eirini Karagianni – opera singer
- Emmanouil Pantelidakis – costume and set designer
- Stella Chroneou – singer, vocal coach
- Thanasis Alevras – actor, performer

Detailed voting results from Greece (Semi-final 1)
R/O	Country	Jury							Televote	
R/O	Country	Nikos	E. Karagianni	E. Pantelidakis	S. Chroneou	T. Alevras	Rank	Points	Rank	Points
01	Cyprus	1	1	1	1	1	1	12	1	12
02	Montenegro	5	7	6	13	5	6	5	16	
03	Finland	2	4	15	12	12	7	4	15	
04	Poland	7	9	11	9	8	12		13	
05	Slovenia	13	15	8	3	10	10	1	6	5
06	Czech Republic	3	2	16	4	13	3	8	10	1
07	Hungary	16	16	14	15	14	16		14	
08	Belarus	8	10	3	7	4	4	7	9	2
09	Serbia	4	11	10	8	2	5	6	5	6
10	Belgium	6	13	4	16	16	13		12	
11	Georgia	14	6	13	11	9	15		2	10
12	Australia	10	12	2	2	3	2	10	3	8
13	Iceland	11	8	7	6	7	9	2	4	7
14	Estonia	12	14	9	5	11	14		8	3
15	Portugal	9	3	12	10	15	11		11	
16	Greece									
17	San Marino	15	5	5	14	6	8	3	7	4

Detailed voting results from Greece (Final)
R/O	Country	Jury							Televote	
R/O	Country	Nikos	E. Karagianni	E. Pantelidakis	S. Chroneou	T. Alevras	Rank	Points	Rank	Points
01	Malta	13	3	8	9	6	6	5	22	
02	Albania	11	7	7	7	14	8	3	6	5
03	Czech Republic	22	17	3	17	21	13		20	
04	Germany	23	12	14	24	24	23		24	
05	Russia	2	2	1	1	2	2	10	3	8
06	Denmark	25	22	23	23	25	25		19	
07	San Marino	5	9	6	21	4	5	6	21	
08	North Macedonia	16	5	12	8	11	10	1	15	
09	Sweden	7	23	24	11	19	18		18	
10	Slovenia	20	18	9	4	5	7	4	13	
11	Cyprus	1	1	2	2	1	1	12	1	12
12	Netherlands	6	11	10	10	17	12		5	6
13	Greece									
14	Israel	15	13	4	22	16	14		23	
15	Norway	17	25	18	19	10	22		11	
16	United Kingdom	14	20	25	16	23	24		25	
17	Iceland	18	16	22	6	15	17		9	2
18	Estonia	21	24	16	12	13	21		16	
19	Belarus	19	19	13	13	7	16		17	
20	Azerbaijan	4	8	5	5	12	3	8	12	
21	France	12	4	21	20	22	15		10	1
22	Italy	3	10	15	14	3	4	7	2	10
23	Serbia	24	14	11	18	18	20		14	
24	Switzerland	9	21	19	15	20	19		4	7
25	Australia	10	15	20	3	9	9	2	8	3
26	Spain	8	6	17	25	8	11		7	4
