= Montenegro in the Eurovision Song Contest 2019 =

- Eurovision Song Contest 2019
- Participating broadcaster: Radio i Televizija Crne Gore (RTCG)
- Country: Montenegro
- Selection process: Montevizija 2019
- Selection date: 9 February 2019

Competing entry
- Song: "Heaven"
- Artist: D mol
- Songwriters: Dejan Božović; Adis Eminić

Placement
- Semi-final result: Failed to qualify (16th)

Participation chronology

Montenegro was represented at the Eurovision Song Contest 2019 with the song "Heaven" written by Dejan Božović and Adis Eminić. The song was performed by the group D mol. The Montenegrin broadcaster Radio i televizija Crne Gore (RTCG) organised the national final Montevizija 2019 in order to select the Montenegrin entry for the 2019 contest in Tel Aviv, Israel. Five entries competed in the national final on 9 February 2019 where the winner was selected over two rounds of voting. In the first round, the top two entries advanced to the superfinal following the combination of the votes of an international jury, a Montenegrin jury, a radio jury and public televoting. In the superfinal, "Heaven" performed by D-moll was selected as the winner entirely by a public televote, gaining 62% of the votes. The group was later renamed as D mol for the Eurovision Song Contest.

Montenegro was drawn to compete in the first semi-final of the Eurovision Song Contest which took place on 14 May 2019. Performing during the show in position 2, "Heaven" was not announced among the top 10 entries of the first semi-final and therefore did not qualify to compete in the final. It was later revealed that Montenegro placed sixteenth out of the 17 participating countries in the semi-final with 46 points.

== Background ==
Prior to the 2019 contest, Montenegro had participated in the Eurovision Song Contest as an independent nation ten times since its first entry in its own right in 2007. The nation's best placing in the contest was thirteenth, which they achieved in 2015 with the song "Adio" performed by Knez. In 2018, Montenegro failed to qualify with the song "Inje" performed by Vanja Radovanović.. The nation briefly withdrew from the competition between 2010 and 2011 citing financial difficulties as the reason for their absence.

The Montenegrin national broadcaster, Radio i televizija Crne Gore (RTCG), broadcasts the event within Montenegro and organises the selection process for the nation's entry. RTCG confirmed that Montenegro would participate at the Eurovision Song Contest 2019 on 26 September 2018. Montenegro has used various methods to select the Montenegrin entry in the past, such as internal selections and televised national finals to choose the performer, song or both to compete at Eurovision. For 2019, the broadcaster returned to using a national final format to select the Montenegrin entry; RTCG opted to internally select both the artist and song that would represent Montenegro between 2009 and 2017.

== Before Eurovision ==
=== Montevizija 2019 ===
Montevizija 2019 was the national final organised by RTCG in order to select the Montenegrin entry for the Eurovision Song Contest 2018. Five entries competed in a televised final on 9 February 2019, which was held at the RTCG studios in Podgorica and hosted by Ajda Šufta and Ivan Maksimović. The show was televised on TVCG 1, TVCG SAT and TVCG HD as well as broadcast online via the broadcaster's website rtcg.me.

==== Competing entries ====
On 28 October 2018, RTCG opened a submission period where artists and songwriters were able to submit their entries until 28 November 2018. Songwriters of any nationality were allowed to submit entries, but artists were required to be citizens of Montenegro and each songwriter was able to submit a maximum of two entries. RTCG received 27 entries at the closing of the deadline. A selection jury that consisted of Radio Montenegro music editor Vladimir Maraš, music teacher and solo singing professor Aleksandra Vojvodić Jovović, TVCG music editor Branka Banović and composers Slobodan Bučevac and Mihailo Radonjić evaluated and marked the received submissions against a number of criteria: up to 50 points for composition, up to 30 points for lyrics and up to 20 points for the production potential of the composition. The top five entries were selected for the national final and announced on 18 December 2018.

Artist	Song	Songwriter(s)
Andrea Demirović	"Ja sam ti san" (Ја сам ти сан)	Andrea Demirović, Michael James Down, Primož Poglajen, Adam Featherstone, Will Taylor
D-moll	"Heaven"	Dejan Božović, Adis Eminić
Ivana Popović-Martinović	"Nevinost" (Невиност)	Slavko Milovanović, Ivana Popović-Martinović
Monika Knezović	"Nepogrješivo" (Непогрјешиво)	Vladimir Graić, Snežana Vukomanović
Nina Petković	"Uzmi ili ostavi" (Узми или остави)	Bojan Momčilović, Nina Petković, Zoran Radonjić

==== Final ====
The final took place on 17 February 2018. The five competing entries were performed and the winner was selected over two rounds of voting. In the first round, the combination of the votes of an international jury (25%), a Montenegrin expert jury (25%), a radio jury (25%) and public televoting (25%) selected the top two entries to proceed to the second round, the superfinal. In the superfinal, "Heaven" performed by D-moll was selected as the winner entirely by public televoting. The international jury panel consisted of Ruslana (winner of the Eurovision Song Contest 2004 for Ukraine), Eldar Gasimov (winner of the Eurovision Song Contest 2011 for Azerbaijan), Lea Sirk (represented Slovenia in the Eurovision Song Contest 2018), András Kállay-Saunders (represented Hungary in the Eurovision Song Contest 2014), Ira Losco (represented Malta in the Eurovision Song Contest 2002 and 2016) and Jovan Radomir (Swedish television presenter), while the Montenegrin jury panel consisted of Vjera Nikolić (professor at the Music School "Vasa Pavić"), Verica Čuljković (violinist), Saša Barjaktarović (conductor), Igor Perović (composer) and Marko Pešić (represented Montenegro in the Eurovision Song Contest 2016 as a member of Highway). In addition to the performances of the competing entries, the show also featured a guest appearance by 2006 Bosnian Eurovision entrant Hari Mata Hari.

Final – 9 February 2019
R/O	Artist	Song	Jury			Televote	Total	Place
R/O	Artist	Song	Intl.	Expert	Radio	Televote	Total	Place
1	D-moll	"Heaven"	5	2	5	5	17	1
2	Andrea Demirović	"Ja sam ti san"	1	3	3	0	7	3
3	Monika Knezović	"Nepogrješivo"	2	1	0	1	4	5
4	Ivana Popović-Martinović	"Nevinost"	3	5	1	3	12	2
5	Nina Petković	"Uzmi ili ostavi"	0	0	2	2	4	4

Detailed International Jury Votes
R/O	Song	Ruslana	Eldar Gasimov	Lea Sirk	András Kállay-Saunders	Ira Losco	Jovan Radomir	Total	Points
R/O	Song	UKR	AZE	SLO	HUN	MLT	SWE	Total	Points
1	"Heaven"	2	1	3	2	1	2	11	5
2	"Ja sam ti san"	4	5	5	1	4	3	22	1
3	"Nepogrješivo"	1	3	4	4	3	4	19	2
4	"Nevinost"	3	4	1	3	2	1	14	3
5	"Uzmi ili ostavi"	5	2	2	5	5	5	24	0

Detailed Radio Jury Votes
R/O	Song	Andrijevica	Cetinje	Bar	Ulcinj	Budva	Tivat	Kotor	Herceg Novi	R98	CG1	Nikšić	Danilovgrad	Bijelo Polje	Glas Plava	Rožaje	Berane	Petnjica	Total score	Points
1	"Heaven"	1	1	5	3	5	3	1	1	4	4	1	5	2	2	2	1	1	42	5
2	"Ja sam ti san"	4	2	1	2	2	2	2	5	2	2	5	2	1	1	4	2	3	42	3
3	"Nepogrješivo"	2	3	3	5	3	4	5	4	1	3	4	4	5	5	3	4	5	63	0
4	"Nevinost"	5	5	4	1	4	5	3	2	3	1	3	1	3	3	5	5	2	55	1
5	"Uzmi ili ostavi"	3	4	2	4	1	1	4	3	5	5	2	3	4	4	1	3	4	53	2

Superfinal – 9 February 2019
R/O	Artist	Song	Televote	Place
1	D-moll	"Heaven"	62%	1
2	Ivana Popović-Martinović	"Nevinost"	38%	2

=== Promotion ===
D mol made several appearances across Europe to specifically promote "Heaven" as the Montenegrin Eurovision entry. On 6 April, D mol performed during the Eurovision in Concert event which was held at the AFAS Live venue in Amsterdam, Netherlands and hosted by Edsilia Rombley and Marlayne. The members of D mol later split into two groups of three to take part in additional promotional activities; Mirela Ljumić, Željko Vukčević and Rizo Feratović performed during the PrePartyES 2019 event, which was held on 21 April at the Sala La Riviera venue in Madrid, Spain and hosted by Tony Aguilar and Julia Varela, while Tamara Vujačić, Ivana Obradović and Emel Franca performed during the Moscow Eurovision Pre Party 2019, which was held on 24 April at the Vegas City Hall in Moscow, Russia and hosted by Alexey Lebedev and Andres Safari.

== At Eurovision ==
According to Eurovision rules, all nations with the exceptions of the host country and the "Big Five" (France, Germany, Italy, Spain and the United Kingdom) are required to qualify from one of two semi-finals in order to compete for the final; the top ten countries from each semi-final progress to the final. The European Broadcasting Union (EBU) split up the competing countries into six different pots based on voting patterns from previous contests, with countries with favourable voting histories put into the same pot. On 28 January 2019, an allocation draw was held which placed each country into one of the two semi-finals, as well as which half of the show they would perform in. Montenegro was placed into the first semi-final, to be held on 14 May 2019, and was scheduled to perform in the first half of the show.

Once all the competing songs for the 2019 contest had been released, the running order for the semi-finals was decided by the shows' producers rather than through another draw, so that similar songs were not placed next to each other. Montenegro was set to perform in position 2, following the entry from Cyprus and before the entry from Finland.

The two semi-finals and the final were broadcast in Montenegro on TVCG 1, TVCG 2 and TVCG SAT with commentary by Dražen Bauković and Tijana Mišković. The Montenegrin spokesperson, who announced the top 12-point score awarded by the Montenegrin jury during the final, was Ajda Šufta.

=== Semi-final ===
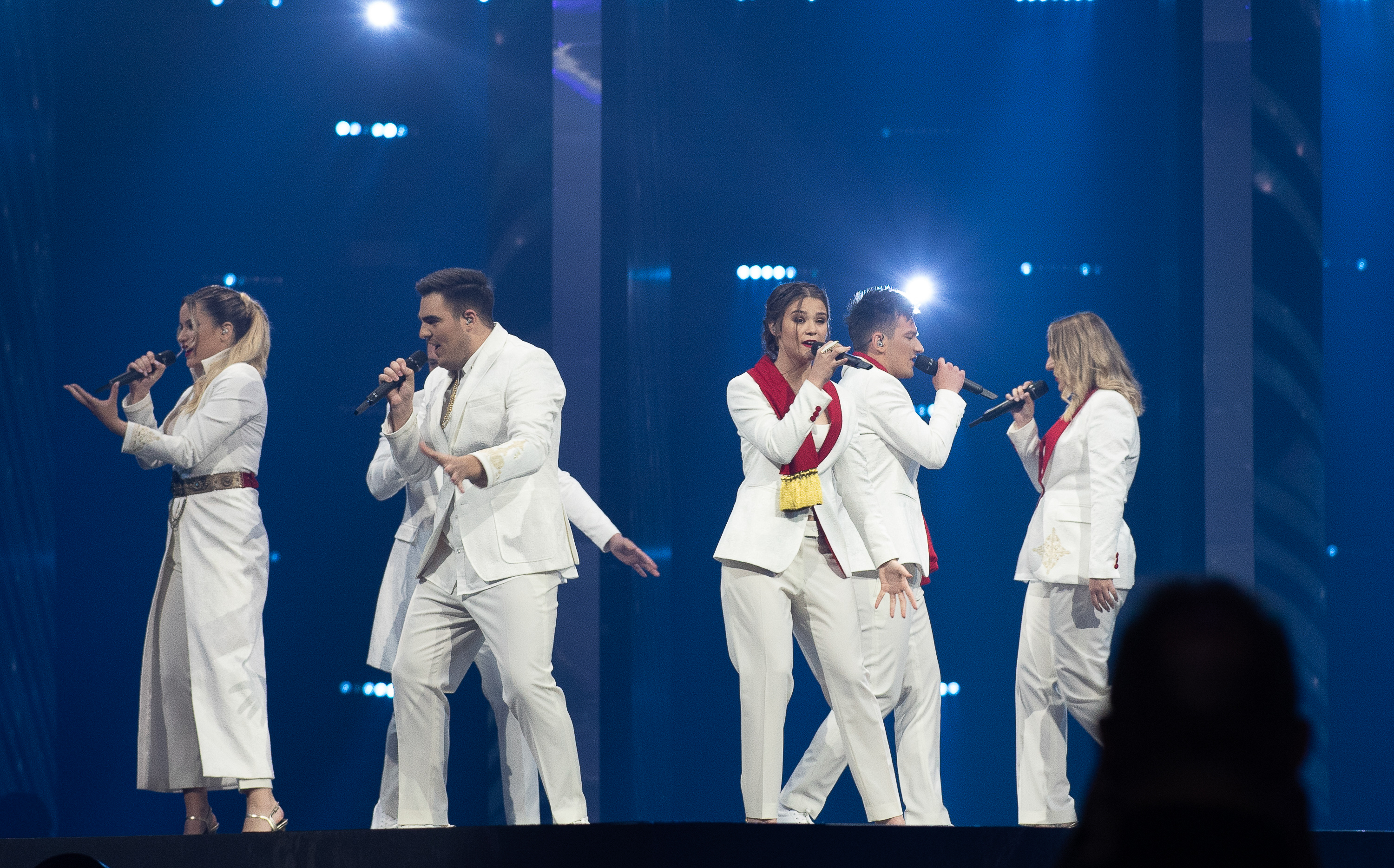
D mol during a rehearsal before the first semi-final

D mol took part in technical rehearsals on 4 and 9 May, followed by dress rehearsals on 13 and 14 May. This included the jury show on 13 May where the professional juries of each country watched and voted on the competing entries.

The Montenegrin performance featured the members of D mol on stage in white and red outfits. The performance began with the group members scattered throughout the stage before meeting up to the middle of the stage to form a circle during the chorus. At the end of the song, the group performed a simulation that involved five of the members supporting the remaining member Mirela Ljumić who was about to fall to the floor. The stage director for the performance was Gorčin Stojanović and the choreographer was Staša Stanković.

At the end of the show, Montenegro was not announced among the top 10 entries in the first semi-final and therefore failed to qualify to compete in the final. It was later revealed that Montenegro placed sixteenth in the semi-final, receiving a total of 46 points: 15 points from the televoting and 31 points from the juries.

=== Voting ===
Voting during the three shows involved each country awarding two sets of points from 1–8, 10 and 12: one from their professional jury and the other from televoting. Each nation's jury consisted of five music industry professionals who are citizens of the country they represent, with their names published before the contest to ensure transparency. This jury judged each entry based on: vocal capacity; the stage performance; the song's composition and originality; and the overall impression by the act. In addition, no member of a national jury was permitted to be related in any way to any of the competing acts in such a way that they cannot vote impartially and independently. The individual rankings of each jury member as well as the nation's televoting results will be released shortly after the grand final.

Below is a breakdown of points awarded to Montenegro and awarded by Montenegro in the first semi-final and grand final of the contest, and the breakdown of the jury voting and televoting conducted during the two shows:

==== Points awarded to Montenegro ====
Points awarded to Montenegro (Semi-final 1)
Score	Televote	Jury
12 points		Serbia
10 points		San Marino
8 points	Serbia	
7 points	Slovenia	
6 points		
5 points		Greece
4 points		Cyprus
3 points		
2 points		
1 point		

==== Points awarded by Montenegro ====
Points awarded by Montenegro (Semi-final 1)
Score	Televote	Jury
12 points	Serbia	Greece
10 points	San Marino	San Marino
8 points	Slovenia	Cyprus
7 points	Australia	Serbia
6 points	Iceland	Hungary
5 points	Belarus	Australia
4 points	Cyprus	Iceland
3 points	Czech Republic	Czech Republic
2 points	Estonia	Georgia
1 point	Greece	Slovenia

Points awarded by Montenegro (Final)
Score	Televote	Jury
12 points	Serbia	Serbia
10 points	Russia	Russia
8 points	San Marino	Albania
7 points	Albania	North Macedonia
6 points	North Macedonia	Malta
5 points	Italy	Cyprus
4 points	Slovenia	Australia
3 points	Azerbaijan	Denmark
2 points	Iceland	Italy
1 point	Netherlands	Czech Republic

==== Detailed voting results ====
The following members composed the Montenegrin jury:

- Vjera Nikolić (jury chairperson) – music professor
- Verica Čuljković – music professor
- Marko Pešić – musician, represented Montenegro in the 2016 contest as member of Highway
- Saša Barjaktarović – music professor
- Igor Perović – musician, journalist

Detailed voting results from Montenegro (Semi-final 1)
R/O	Country	Jury							Televote	
R/O	Country	V. Čuljković	M. Pešić	S. Barjaktarović	V. Nikolić	I. Perović	Rank	Points	Rank	Points
01	Cyprus	2	4	2	3	6	3	8	7	4
02	Montenegro									
03	Finland	12	13	10	16	11	12		15	
04	Poland	9	12	13	15	14	15		13	
05	Slovenia	14	16	12	11	9	10	1	3	8
06	Czech Republic	4	5	7	9	10	8	3	8	3
07	Hungary	6	11	4	4	7	5	6	14	
08	Belarus	16	10	14	10	13	14		6	5
09	Serbia	3	8	5	2	1	4	7	1	12
10	Belgium	8	14	16	14	12	11		11	
11	Georgia	10	7	8	8	5	9	2	16	
12	Australia	7	3	9	5	8	6	5	4	7
13	Iceland	11	6	6	7	4	7	4	5	6
14	Estonia	13	15	15	12	16	16		9	2
15	Portugal	15	9	11	13	15	13		12	
16	Greece	1	2	1	6	2	1	12	10	1
17	San Marino	5	1	3	1	3	2	10	2	10

Detailed voting results from Montenegro (Final)
R/O	Country	Jury							Televote	
R/O	Country	V. Čuljković	M. Pešić	S. Barjaktarović	V. Nikolić	I. Perović	Rank	Points	Rank	Points
01	Malta	12	6	4	4	5	5	6	19	
02	Albania	16	3	2	3	2	3	8	4	7
03	Czech Republic	10	15	8	16	8	10	1	18	
04	Germany	11	25	24	25	23	23		26	
05	Russia	15	1	1	1	3	2	10	2	10
06	Denmark	4	17	20	9	13	8	3	17	
07	San Marino	26	26	26	6	26	19		3	8
08	North Macedonia	2	5	5	5	6	4	7	5	6
09	Sweden	8	12	13	15	22	17		20	
10	Slovenia	19	10	19	14	7	15		7	4
11	Cyprus	24	4	6	18	4	6	5	14	
12	Netherlands	20	13	12	7	9	12		10	1
13	Greece	25	7	25	26	25	20		23	
14	Israel	17	19	23	24	21	25		25	
15	Norway	5	22	17	22	12	14		13	
16	United Kingdom	21	18	21	21	20	24		24	
17	Iceland	6	24	10	19	14	13		9	2
18	Estonia	23	23	9	11	15	18		21	
19	Belarus	13	16	14	20	24	22		16	
20	Azerbaijan	14	11	7	10	16	11		8	3
21	France	18	21	22	23	19	26		22	
22	Italy	7	9	15	8	17	9	2	6	5
23	Serbia	1	2	3	2	1	1	12	1	12
24	Switzerland	9	14	11	12	18	16		11	
25	Australia	3	8	18	13	10	7	4	15	
26	Spain	22	20	16	17	11	21		12	
