= D mol =

Montenegrin vocal group

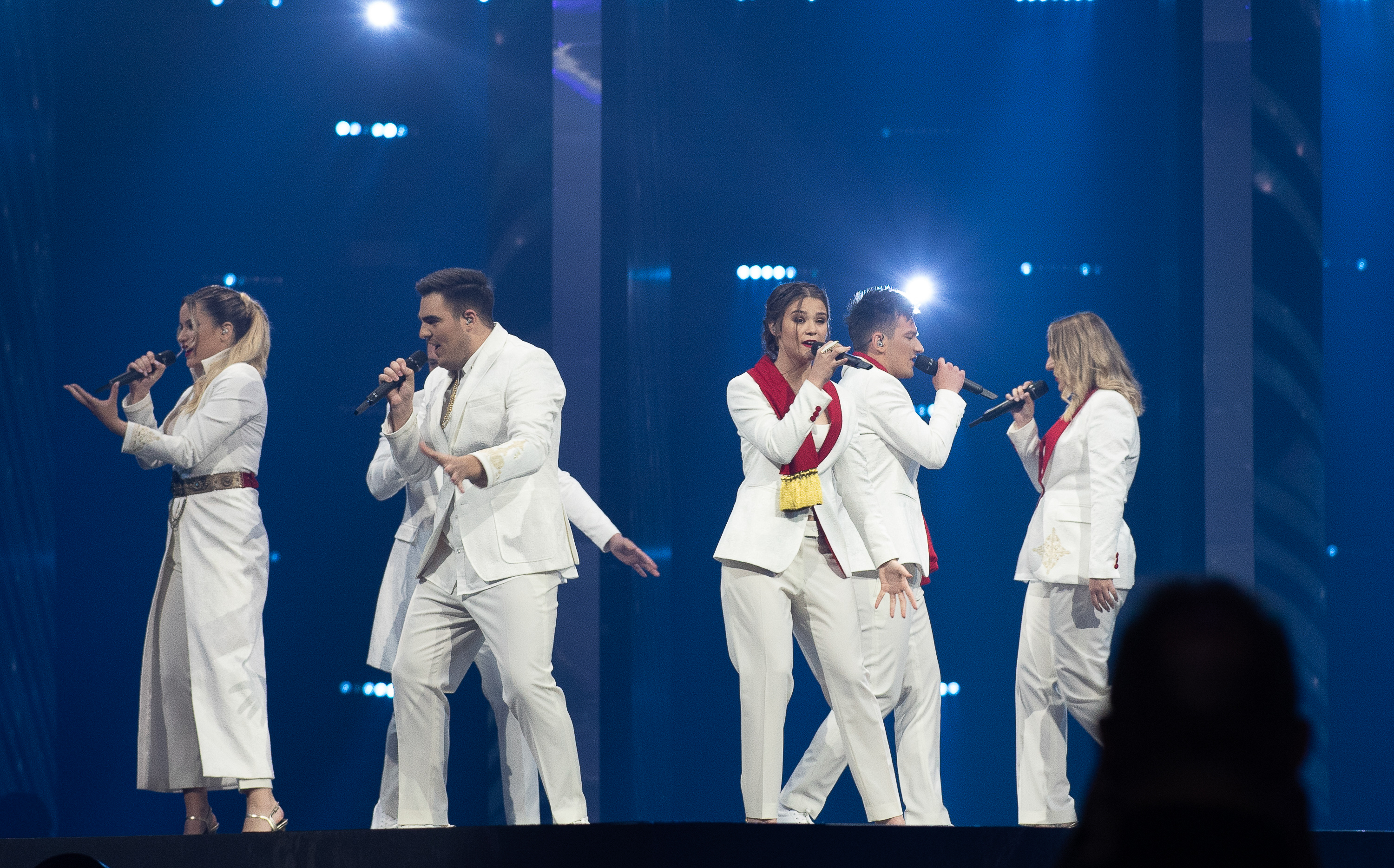
- D Mol in 2019

Background information
- Origin: Podgorica, Montenegro
- Genres: Pop
- Years active: 2019
- Past members: Tamara Vujačić; Mirela Ljumić; Željko Vukčević; Ivana Obradović; Emel Franca; Rizo Feratović

D mol were a Montenegrin vocal group that represented their country in the Eurovision Song Contest 2019.

They were selected to represent Montenegro in the Eurovision Song Contest 2019 after winning the country's national selection, Montevizija. They performed their entry, "Heaven", in the first half of the first semi-final in Tel Aviv where they failed to qualify for the final. The group's name was originally spelt D-Moll but in early March 2019 it was confirmed as D mol.

== Members ==
- Rizo Feratović was born on 15 November 1997 in Dragaš.
- Željko Vukčević was born on 8 January 2000 in Podgorica.
- Ivana Obradović was born on 21 February 2000 in Bijelo Polje.
- Emel Franca was born on 12 August 2000 in Bijelo Polje.
- Mirela Ljumić was born on 12 March 2001 in Podgorica.
- Tamara Vujačić was born on 5 August 2002 in Podgorica.

== Discography ==
=== Singles ===
Title	Year	Album
"Heaven"	2019	Non-album single
"21. maj"	2019	Non-album single

Preceded by Vanja Radovanović with "Inje"	Montenegro in the Eurovision Song Contest; 2019	Succeeded by Vladana with "Breathe"
