= Mirud (singer) =

American singer-songwriter

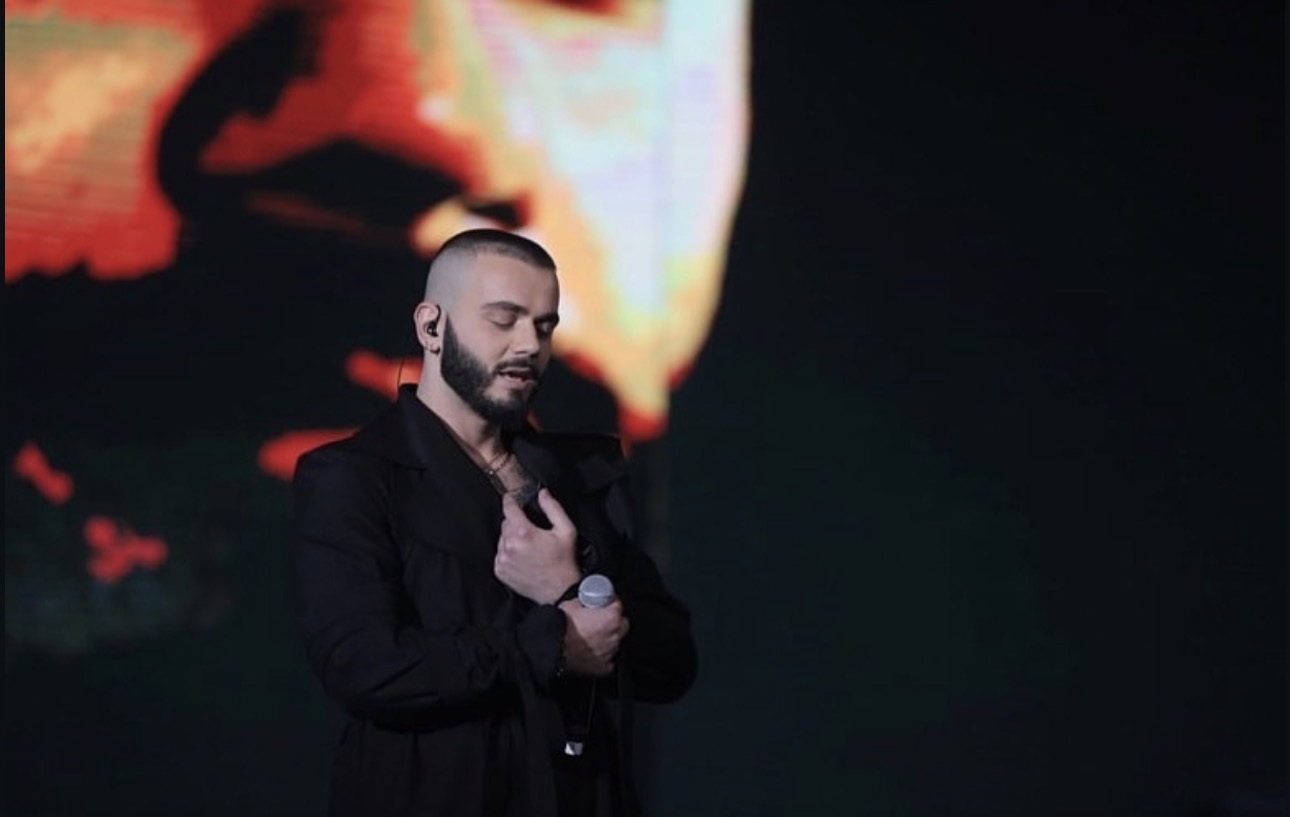
- Mirud performing at Festivali i Këngës 60 in 2021

Background information
- Born: Durim Morina; October 17, 1994 (age 31); Los Angeles, California, U.S.
- Genres: Latin pop; sertanejo music; world music; classical crossover
- Occupations: Singer, songwriter
- Instruments: Vocals; piano; guitar
- Years active: 2013–present
- Label: SME Records Inc.
- Website: https://mirudofficial.com

Durim Morina (born October 17, 1994), known professionally as Mirud, is an American singer-songwriter. He participated in the Viña del Mar International Song Festival in 2019, and in several editions of Festivali i Këngës.

== Early life and background ==
Morina was born on October 17, 1994, in Los Angeles, California to Kosovo Albanian parents. He started his musical career after graduating in opera studies from the Juilliard School in New York.

== Career ==
Morina began releasing original music in the late 2010s. He has appeared in interviews or music segments on several broadcasters.

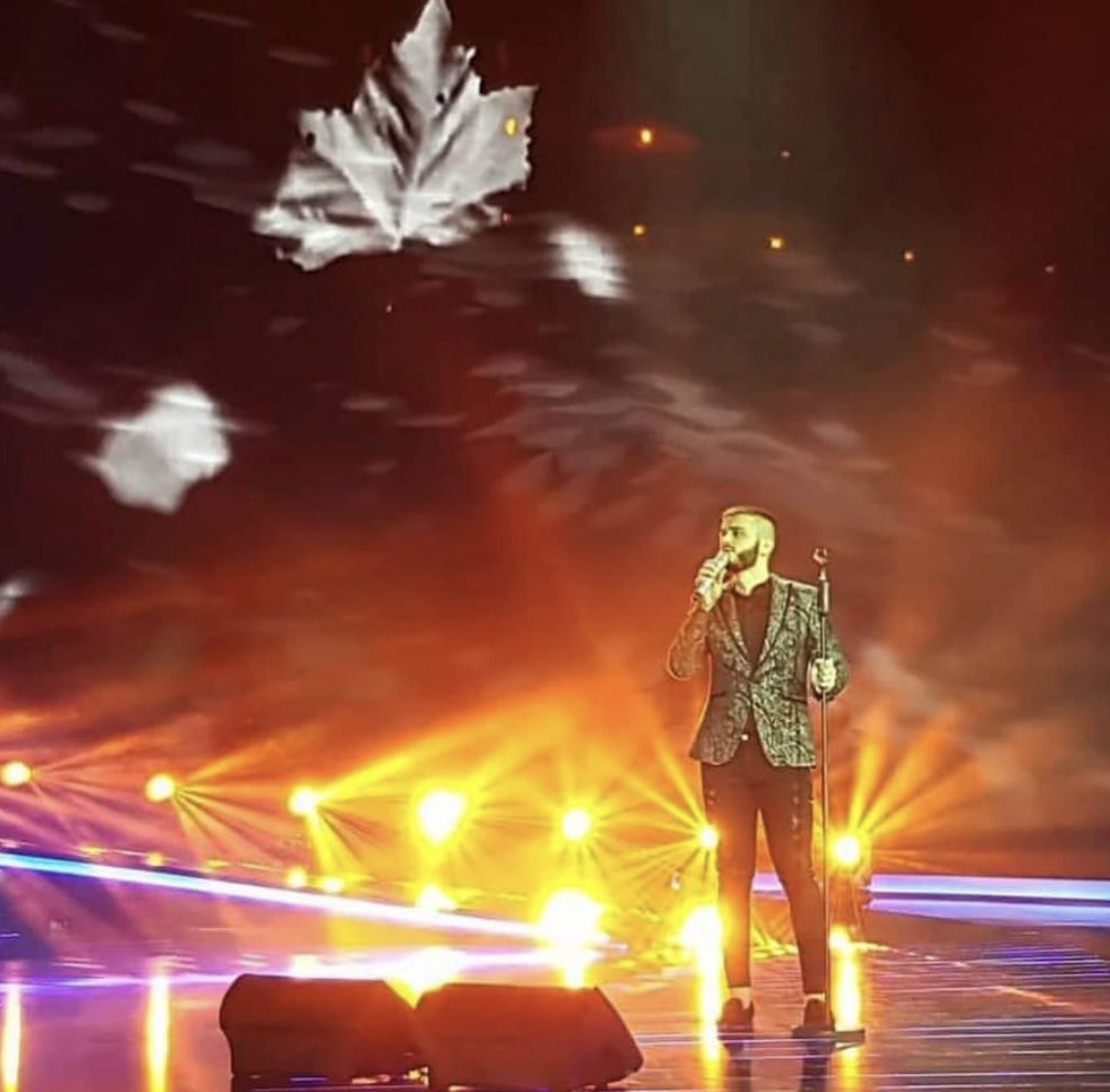
Mirud performing at Festivali i Këngës 57 in 2018

In 2018, he participated in the 57th Festivali i Këngës, an Albanian music festival, but was eliminated during the semi-final with the song "Nënë". The following year, he represented Albania at the 60th edition of the Viña del Mar International Song Festival in Chile, one of the first Kosovar artists to be invited to compete there.

In 2020, he competed again at Festivali i Këngës 59, performing the song "Nëse vdes". He was forced to withdraw from the 2021 Kënga Magjike after testing positive for COVID-19, but later that year reached the final of Festivali i Këngës 60 with "Për dreq".

In December 2025, Mirud announced the forthcoming release of his studio album Desnudo in Latin America.

In 2026, following his appearance at the San Marino music festival, Mirud was confirmed as a participant in the auditions stage of San Marino Song Contest, the national selection process used to choose San Marino's representative for the Eurovision Song Contest 2026. However, it was reported that after the success of his 2026 album Desnudo, he withdrew from the contest.

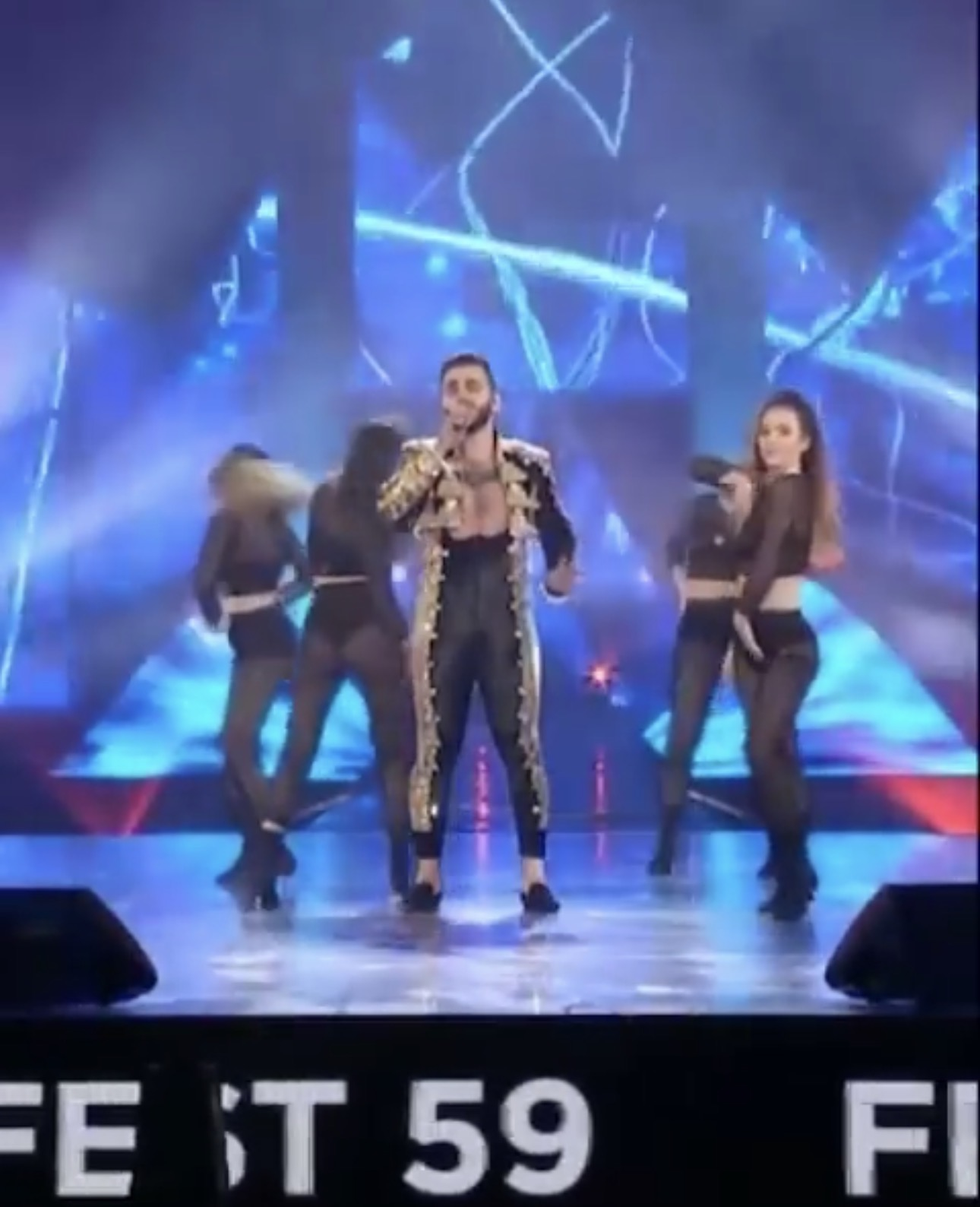
Mirud at Festivali i Këngës 59 in 2020

== Public image ==
Following Mirud's appearance at Festivali i Këngës 59 in 2020, his staging and costume were criticized on social media; he addressed the comments on TvKlan.

== Discography ==
=== Albums ===
- 2024 – Djali (Deluxe Edition)
- 2025 – Entre mundos/Entre os mundos
- 2025 – Desnudo

=== EPs ===
- 2021 – Valide-i maktûle
- 2025 – Dónde va el alma

=== Compilation ===
- 2025 – Whispers from the Red Dunes

=== Singles ===
- 2013 – "Block Me"
- 2014 – "Shén"
- 2015 – "Stuck in My Bed"
- 2016 – "Aether"
- 2017 – "You Got Me"
- 2018 – "Ende të dua"
- 2018 – "Nënë"
- 2019 – "Explodiu o baile"
- 2020 – "Blessed"
- 2020 – "Nëse vdes"
- 2021 – "Për dreq"
- 2022 – "Si ke dasht"
- 2022 – "Blind"
- 2025 – "Deep End"
- 2025 – "Come to Me"
- 2025 – "Escondes"
- 2025 – "Reste encore"
- 2025 – "Dangerous"
- 2025 – "Mountain Top"
- 2025 – "Chance on Me"
- 2025 – "Back & Forth"
- 2025 – "Sweet Tajine"
- 2025 – "Ride the Sin"
- 2025 – "Màtame lento"
- 2025 – "Mallkim"
- 2025 – "Dios me lo quitó"
- 2025 – "Sin sentencia"
- 2025 – "Cerca del vicio"
- 2025 – "El silencio de Dios"
