= Albania in the Eurovision Song Contest 2019 =

- Eurovision Song Contest 2019
- Participating broadcaster: Radio Televizioni Shqiptar (RTSH)
- Country: Albania
- Selection process: Festivali i Këngës 57
- Selection date: 22 December 2018

Competing entry
- Song: "Ktheju tokës"
- Artist: Jonida Maliqi
- Songwriter: Eriona Rushiti

Placement
- Semi-final result: Qualified (9th, 96 points)
- Final result: 17th, 90 points

Participation chronology

Albania was represented at the Eurovision Song Contest 2019 with the song "Ktheju tokës", written by Eriona Rushiti, and performed by Jonida Maliqi. The Albanian participating broadcaster, Radio Televizioni Shqiptar (RTSH), selected its entry for the contest through the national selection competition Festivali i Këngës in December 2018. Prior to the contest, the song was promoted by a music video and live performances in the Netherlands, Spain, and the United Kingdom.

Albania was drawn to compete in the second semi-final of the Eurovision Song Contest, which took place on 16 May 2019. Performing as number 14, the nation was announced among the top 10 entries of the second semi-final and therefore qualified to compete in the final. In the grand final on 18 May 2019, it performed as number two and placed 17th out of the 26 participating countries, scoring 90 points.

== Background ==
Prior to the 2019 contest, Radio Televizioni Shqiptar (RTSH) had participated in the Eurovision Song Contest representing Albania fifteen times since its first entry in 2004. Its highest placing in the contest, to this point, had been the fifth place, which it achieved in 2012 with the song "Suus" performed by Rona Nishliu. The first entry was performed by Anjeza Shahini with the song "The Image of You" finishing in the seventh place, the nation's second-highest placing to date. During its tenure in the contest, Albania failed to qualify for the final seven times, with both the 2016 and 2017 entries being the most recent non-qualifiers. In 2018, the nation qualified for the final with Eugent Bushpepa finishing in 11th place with "Mall".

As part of its duties as participating broadcaster, RTSH broadcasts the event in the country, and since its debut in 2004, has consistently selected its entry through the long-standing competition Festivali i Këngës. In September 2018, RTSH officially confirmed its participation in the 2019 contest.

== Before Eurovision ==
=== Festivali i Këngës ===
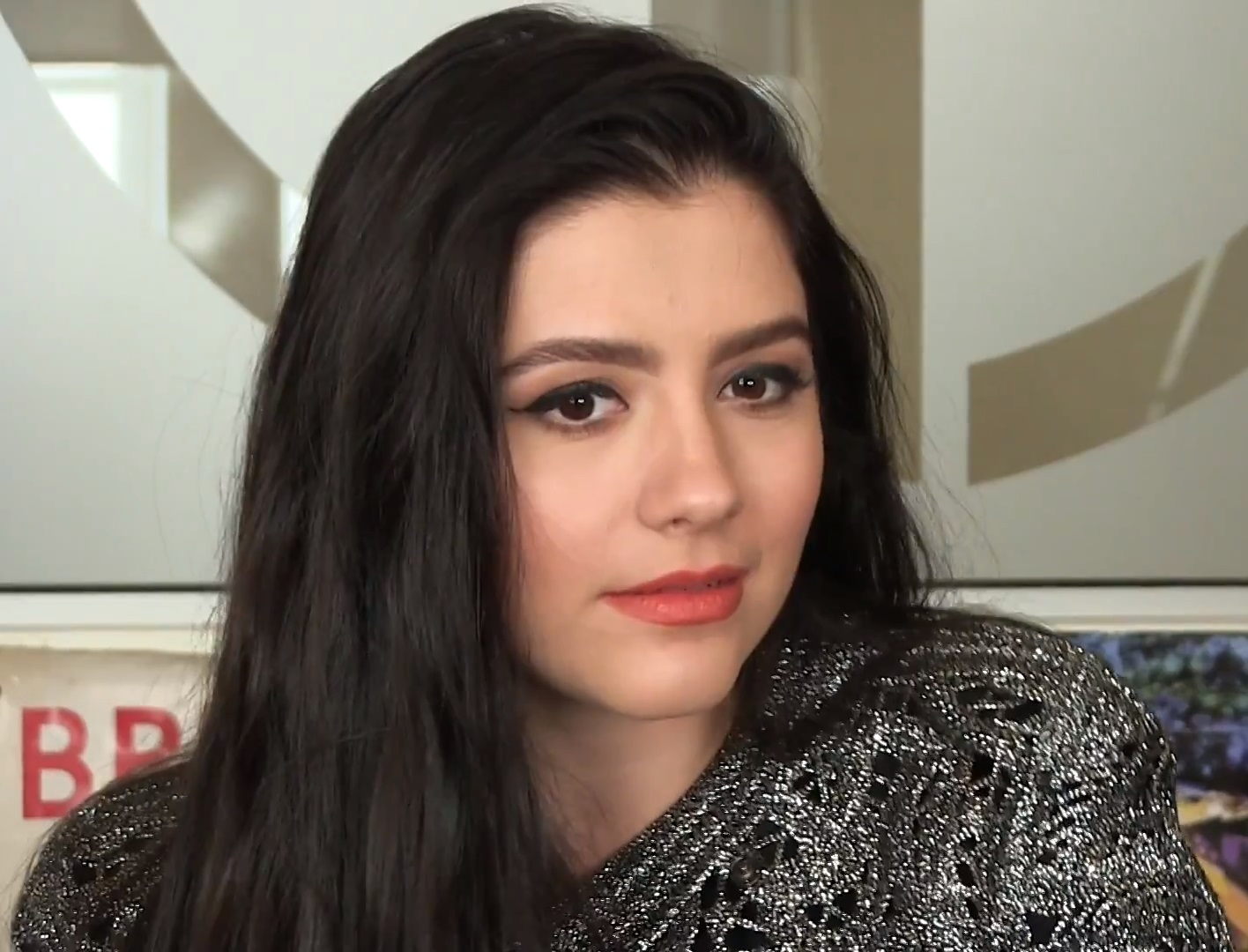
Ana Golja co-hosted the 57th edition of Festivali i Këngës

Radio Televizioni Shqiptar (RTSH) organised the 57th edition of Festivali i Këngës to select its entry for the Eurovision Song Contest 2019. The competition consisted of two semi-finals on 20 and 21 December, respectively, and the grand final on 22 December 2018. The three live shows were hosted by Albanian-Canadian actress Ana Golja and Albanian television presenter Viktor Zhusti. The broadcaster had previously confirmed the nation's participation in the contest in September 2018. It opened a submission period between 16 May and 30 September 2018 for artists and composers to participate in the competition. The list of competing artists and songs was officially revealed on 17 October 2018, being shortlisted to compete in the two semi-finals of the contest.

==== Competing entries ====
Competing entries
Artist	Song	Songwriter(s)
Alar Band	"Dashuria nuk mjafton"	Elgit Doda; Klea Huta
Artemisa Mithi and Febi Shkurti	"Dua ta besoj"	Febi Shkurti
Aurel Thëllimi	"Të dua ty"	Ardita Bufaj; Aurel Thëllimi
Bojken Lako	"Jeto jetën"	Bojken Lako; Xhevdet Bajraj
Bruno Pollogati	"Nuk ka stop"	Bruno Pollogati; Endrit Mumajesi
Dilan Reka	"Karma"	Gridi Kraja; Florian Zykaj
Eliza Hoxha	"Peng"	Eliza Hoxha
Elona Islamaj	"Në këtë botë kalimtarë"	Elona Islamaj
Elton Deda	"Qetësisht"	Elton Deda
Eranda Libohova	"100 pyetje"	Genti Myftaraj; Pandi Laço
Gjergj Leka	"Një ditë tjetër"	Gjergj Leka
Jonida Maliqi	"Ktheju tokës"	Eriona Rushiti
Kelly	"A më ndjen"	Kelly
Klinti Çollaku	"Me jetë"	Endrit Shani; Pandi Laço
Klodiana Vata	"Mbrëmje e pafund"	Edmond Zhulali; Jorgo Papingji
Kujtim Prodani	"Babela"	Kujtim Prodani
Lidia Lufi	"Rrëfehem"	Enis Mullaj; Lidia Lufi
Lorela Sejdini	"Vetmi"	Lorela Sejdini
Marko Strazimiri and Imbro	"Leyla"	Adrian Hila
Mirud	"Nënë"	Elhaida Dani; Durim Morina
Orgesa Zaimi	"Hije"	Gentian Lako
Soni Malaj	"Më e fortë"	Irkenc Hyka; Lindon Berisha
Vikena Kamenica (Note: On 3 December 2018, RTSH announced that Vikena Kamenica would withdraw from the 57th edition of Festivali i Këngës due to scheduling issues. Kamenica was subsequently replaced by Artemisa Mithi and Febi Shkurti.)	"Natën e mirë"	Vikena Kamenica

==== Shows ====
===== Semi-finals =====
The semi-finals of Festivali i Këngës took place on 20 December and 21 December 2018, and were broadcast live at 20:45 (CET) on the respective dates. The first semi-final was closed by Italy's Eurovision Song Contest 2018 representative Ermal Meta. In it, the competing artists traditionally performed in cooperation with a symphonic orchestra. During the second semi-final, the 22 acts delivered performances of the final versions of their entries as intended to be performed on the stage of the Eurovision Song Contest.

Semi-final 1 – 20 December 2018
R/O	Artist	Song
1	Bojken Lako	"Jeto jetën"
2	Alar Band	"Dashuria nuk mjafton"
3	Lidia Lufi	"Rrëfehem"
4	Kujtim Prodani	"Babela"
5	Gjergj Leka	"Një ditë tjetër"
6	Dilan Reka	"Karma"
7	Mirud	"Nënë"
8	Soni Malaj	"Më e fortë"
9	Jonida Maliqi	"Ktheju tokës"
10	Elton Deda	"Qetësisht"
11	Elona Islamaj	"Në këtë botë kalimtarë"
12	Klodiana Vata	"Mbrëmje e pafund"
13	Klinti Çollaku	"Me jetë"
14	Artemisa Mithi and Febi Shkurti	"Dua ta besoj"
15	Kelly	"A më ndjen"
16	Bruno Pollogati	"Nuk ka stop"
17	Marko Strazimiri and Imbro	"Leyla"
18	Lorela Sejdini	"Vetmi"
19	Eliza Hoxha	"Peng"
20	Eranda Libohova	"100 pyetje"
21	Aurel Thëllimi	"Të dua ty"
22	Orgesa Zaimi	"Hije"

Semi-final 2 – 21 December 2018
R/O	Artist	Song
1	Jonida Maliqi	"Ktheju tokës"
2	Artemisa Mithi and Febi Shkurti (with Manuel Moscati)	"Dua ta besoj"
3	Mirud	"Nënë"
4	Klodiana Vata	"Mbrëmje e pafund"
5	Lidia Lufi (with Tiri)	"Rrëfehem"
6	Marko Strazimiri and Imbro (with Aurela Gaçe)	"Leyla"
7	Orgesa Zaimi	"Hije"
8	Elona Islamaj	"Në këtë botë kalimtarë"
9	Bojken Lako (with Anxhela Llaha)	"Jeto jetën"
10	Elton Deda	"Qetësisht"
11	Eliza Hoxha	"Peng"
12	Gjergj Leka	"Një ditë tjetër"
13	Kujtim Prodani	"Babela"
14	Aurel Thëllimi	"Të dua ty"
15	Soni Malaj	"Më e fortë"
16	Lorela Sejdini	"Vetmi"
17	Klinti Çollaku	"Me jetë"
18	Alar Band	"Dashuria nuk mjafton"
19	Kelly	"A më ndjen"
20	Dilan Reka	"Karma"
21	Eranda Libohova (with Rosela Gjylbegu)	"100 pyetje"
22	Bruno Pollogati	"Nuk ka stop"

===== Final =====
The grand final of Festivali i Këngës took place on 22 December 2018 and was broadcast live at 20:45 (CET). On the same day, prior to the live show, 14 songs competed and the winner was determined by the combination of the votes from a nine-member jury panel consisting of Agim Krajka, Arta Marku, Dorian Çene, Haig Zacharian, Olsa Toqi, Pali Kuke, Rona Nishliu, Rovena Dilo and Shpëtim Kushta. Before the end of the show, Jonida Maliqi emerged as the winner and was simultaneously announced as the Albania's representative for the Eurovision Song Contest 2019. The results of the final are summarized in the table below:

Final – 22 December 2018
R/O	Artist	Song	Points	Result
1	Marko Strazimiri and Imbro (Note: Due to technical issues during the performance, Marko Strazimiri and Imbro had to perform again after all the performances.)	"Leyla"	142	8
2	Gjergj Leka	"Një ditë tjetër"	131	10
3	Elton Deda	"Qetësisht"	156	7
4	Eranda Libohova (Note: Due to technical issues during the performance, Eranda Libohova had to perform again after all the performances.)	"100 pyetje"	181	3
5	Jonida Maliqi	"Ktheju tokës"	228	1
6	Eliza Hoxha	"Peng"	127	11
7	Orgesa Zaimi	"Hije"	121	13
8	Bojken Lako	"Jeto jetën"	138	9
9	Soni Malaj	"Më e fortë"	166	5
10	Artemisa Mithi and Febi Shkurti	"Dua ta besoj"	113	14
11	Dilan Reka	"Karma"	169	4
12	Alar Band	"Dashuria nuk mjafton"	124	12
13	Lidia Lufi	"Rrëfehem"	219	2
14	Klinti Çollaku	"Me jetë"	163	6

Detailed Jury Votes
R/O	Song	H. Zacharian	A. Marku	R. Nishliu	A. Krajka	P. Kuke	O. Toqi	R. Dilo	Sh. Kushta	D. Çene	Total
1	"Leyla"	14	18	19	15	18	10	25	12	11	142
2	"Një ditë tjetër"	20	12	10	20	11	14	11	15	18	131
3	"Qetësisht"	18	17	17	19	14	15	17	19	20	156
4	"100 pyetye"	22	22	22	25	19	17	18	11	25	181
5	"Ktheju tokës"	19	30	30	18	30	19	30	30	22	228
6	"Peng"	11	16	20	12	15	13	14	10	16	127
7	"Hije"	10	14	16	13	13	12	13	18	12	121
8	"Jeto jetën"	12	15	25	10	16	16	16	13	15	138
9	"Më e forte"	17	19	18	17	20	18	15	25	17	166
10	"Dua ta besoj"	13	13	12	11	10	11	19	14	10	113
11	"Karma"	16	25	14	14	25	22	22	17	14	169
12	"Dashuria nuk mjafton"	15	11	11	16	12	20	10	16	13	124
13	"Rrëfehem"	30	20	15	30	22	30	20	22	30	219
14	"Me jetë"	25	10	13	22	17	25	12	20	19	163

=== Promotion ===
A music video for "Ktheju tokës" premiered via the Eurovision Song Contest's official YouTube channel on 10 March 2019. Outside of the music video, Jonida Maliqi travelled to the Banias Nature Reserve at Mount Hermon in Israel to film her introductory postcard. In the postcard, she is seen dressed in 1950s style clothing while walking through the surroundings. Maliqi is subsequently joined by four female dancers on the edge of a waterfall, where they perform an interpretive dance choreography. For further promotion, the singer embarked on a small tour with live performances at various Eurovision Song Contest-related events, including in Amsterdam, London and Madrid.

== At Eurovision ==
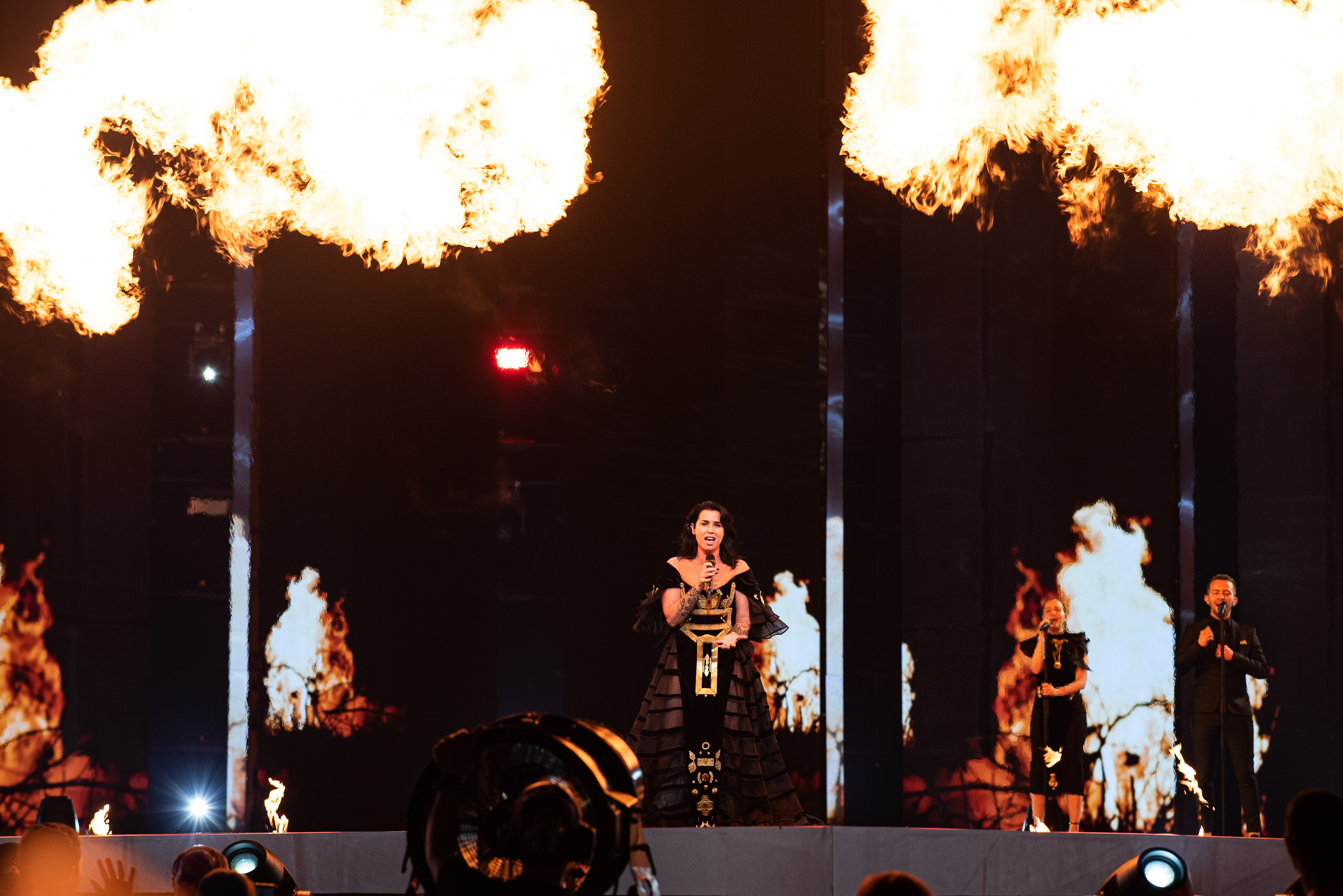
Jonida Maliqi during a rehearsal for the second semi-final of the Eurovision Song Contest 2019.

The Eurovision Song Contest 2019 took place at Expo Tel Aviv in Tel Aviv, Israel, and consisted of two semi-finals held on the respective dates of 14 and 16 May and the grand final on 18 May 2019. According to the Eurovision rules, all participating countries, except the host nation and the "Big Five", consisting of France, Germany, Italy, Spain and the United Kingdom, were required to qualify from one of the two semi-finals to compete for the grand final, although the top 10 countries from the respective semi-final progress to the grand final.

On 28 January 2019, a special allocation draw was held at the Tel Aviv Museum of Art in Tel Aviv that placed each country into one of the two semi-finals, as well as which half of the show they would perform in. Albania was placed into the second semi-final, to be held on 16 May, and was scheduled to perform in the second half of the show. Once all the competing songs for the 2019 contest had been released, the running order for the semi-finals was decided by the producers of the contest rather than through another draw, for preventing similar songs being placed next to each other. Albania was set to perform in position 14, following Russia and preceding Norway. At the end of the semi-final, the nation was announced among the top 10 entries and therefore qualified to compete in the grand final.

=== Voting ===
Voting during the three shows involved each nation awarding two sets of points from 1–8, 10 and 12: one from their professional jury and the other from televoting. Each nation's jury consisted of five music industry professionals who are citizens of the nation they represent, with their names being published before the contest to ensure transparency. This jury judged each entry based on: vocal capacity; the stage performance; the song's composition and originality; and the overall impression by the act. In addition, no member of a national jury was permitted to be related in any way to any of the competing acts in such a way that they cannot vote impartially and independently. The individual rankings of each jury member as well as the nation's televoting results were released soon after the grand final.

The tables below visualise a breakdown of points awarded to Albania in the second semi-final and final of the Eurovision Song Contest 2019, as well as by the nation on both occasions. In the semi-final, Albania finished in ninth place, being awarded a total of 96 points, including 12 by the televoters from Italy, North Macedonia and Switzerland, and the same number of points by the juries from North Macedonia. In the final, Albania reached the 17th place with 90 points, including 12 by the televoters from Italy and North Macedonia, and eight by the juries from Montenegro and North Macedonia. The nation's televoters awarded its 12 points to Norway in the semi-final and to Russia in the final. Its juries awarded its 12 points to North Macedonia in both the semi-final and final.

==== Points awarded to Albania ====
Points awarded to Albania (Semi-final 2)
Score	Televote	Jury
12 points	Italy; North Macedonia; Switzerland	North Macedonia
10 points		
8 points		
7 points		Azerbaijan; Russia
6 points	Croatia	
5 points		Croatia
4 points	Azerbaijan	
3 points	Austria; Romania	Italy
2 points	Germany; Norway; Sweden	Moldova; Romania
1 point		

Points awarded to Albania (Final)
Score	Televote	Jury
12 points	Italy; North Macedonia	
10 points	Switzerland	
8 points		Montenegro; North Macedonia
7 points	Montenegro	Azerbaijan; San Marino
6 points		
5 points	Greece	
4 points		
3 points		Greece; Russia
2 points		Cyprus; Malta; Romania
1 point	Croatia	Italy

==== Points awarded by Albania ====
Points awarded by Albania (Semi-final 2)
Score	Televote	Jury
12 points	Norway	North Macedonia
10 points	Netherlands	Azerbaijan
8 points	North Macedonia	Russia
7 points	Azerbaijan	Sweden
6 points	Switzerland	Malta
5 points	Lithuania	Switzerland
4 points	Sweden	Netherlands
3 points	Croatia	Moldova
2 points	Russia	Croatia
1 point	Denmark	Austria

Points awarded by Albania (Final)
Score	Televote	Jury
12 points	Russia	North Macedonia
10 points	San Marino	Switzerland
8 points	Italy	Azerbaijan
7 points	Netherlands	Cyprus
6 points	North Macedonia	Sweden
5 points	Norway	Italy
4 points	Switzerland	Greece
3 points	Azerbaijan	France
2 points	Greece	Australia
1 point	Australia	Russia

==== Detailed voting results ====
The following members comprised the Albanian jury:

- Gent Rushi (jury chairperson) – pedagogue, jazz musician
- Eranda Libohova – singer
- Dilan Reka – singer
- Julka Gramo – singer, moderator, entertainer
- Vikena Kamenica – mezzo-soprano

Detailed voting results from Albania (Semi-final 2)
R/O	Country	Jury							Televote	
R/O	Country	G. Rushi	E. Libohova	D. Reka	J. Gramo	V. Kamenica	Rank	Points	Rank	Points
01	Armenia	10	14	14	17	12	14		14	
02	Ireland	11	11	13	13	13	12		15	
03	Moldova	12	5	9	9	5	8	3	13	
04	Switzerland	6	6	7	4	7	6	5	5	6
05	Latvia	17	16	15	15	15	17		16	
06	Romania	14	13	11	10	17	13		12	
07	Denmark	15	12	12	7	11	11		10	1
08	Sweden	2	8	5	3	6	4	7	7	4
09	Austria	3	10	10	12	10	10	1	17	
10	Croatia	7	7	6	11	8	9	2	8	3
11	Malta	8	3	3	6	4	5	6	11	
12	Lithuania	16	17	16	14	14	16		6	5
13	Russia	9	1	4	8	3	3	8	9	2
14	Albania									
15	Norway	13	15	17	16	16	15		1	12
16	Netherlands	4	9	8	5	9	7	4	2	10
17	North Macedonia	1	2	2	1	1	1	12	3	8
18	Azerbaijan	5	4	1	2	2	2	10	4	7

Detailed voting results from Albania (Final)
R/O	Country	Jury							Televote	
R/O	Country	G. Rushi	E. Libohova	D. Reka	J. Gramo	V. Kamenica	Rank	Points	Rank	Points
01	Malta	18	12	11	15	16	17		11	
02	Albania									
03	Czech Republic	10	18	24	8	17	16		24	
04	Germany	7	17	15	9	9	12		17	
05	Russia	12	7	7	12	5	10	1	1	12
06	Denmark	6	19	19	11	18	14		21	
07	San Marino	25	25	25	24	25	25		2	10
08	North Macedonia	2	5	6	4	1	1	12	5	6
09	Sweden	1	14	13	2	12	5	6	13	
10	Slovenia	8	13	20	14	13	15		18	
11	Cyprus	22	3	3	3	10	4	7	15	
12	Netherlands	15	8	8	10	4	11		4	7
13	Greece	14	1	4	21	14	7	4	9	2
14	Israel	21	9	9	19	11	13		12	
15	Norway	13	15	21	20	20	19		6	5
16	United Kingdom	11	16	14	13	19	18		20	
17	Iceland	23	23	17	25	24	23		22	
18	Estonia	20	21	18	16	22	22		16	
19	Belarus	16	20	16	22	23	21		25	
20	Azerbaijan	9	4	2	1	8	3	8	8	3
21	France	3	10	10	7	6	8	3	19	
22	Italy	5	6	5	5	7	6	5	3	8
23	Serbia	17	24	23	18	15	20		23	
24	Switzerland	19	2	1	6	3	2	10	7	4
25	Australia	4	11	12	17	2	9	2	10	1
26	Spain	24	22	22	23	21	24		14	
