= Switzerland in the Eurovision Song Contest 2019 =

- Eurovision Song Contest 2019
- Participating broadcaster: Swiss Broadcasting Corporation (SRG SSR)
- Country: Switzerland
- Selection process: Internal selection
- Announcement date: 7 March 2019

Competing entry
- Song: "She Got Me"
- Artist: Luca Hänni
- Songwriters: Laurell Barker; Frazer Mac; Luca Hänni; Jon Hällgren; Lukas Hällgren

Placement
- Semi-final result: Qualified (4th, 232 points)
- Final result: 4th, 364 points

Participation chronology

Switzerland was represented at the Eurovision Song Contest 2019 with the song "She Got Me" written by Laurell Barker, Frazer Mac, Luca Hänni, Jon Hällgren and Lukas Hällgren. The song was performed by Luca Hänni, who was internally selected by the Swiss broadcaster Swiss Broadcasting Corporation (SRG SSR) to represent the nation at the 2019 contest in Tel Aviv, Israel. "She Got Me" was presented to the public as the Swiss entry on 7 March 2019.

Switzerland was drawn to compete in the second semi-final of the Eurovision Song Contest which took place on 16 May 2019. Performing during the show in position 4, "She Got Me" was announced among the top 10 entries of the second semi-final and therefore qualified to compete in the final on 18 May. This marked the first time Switzerland managed to qualify to the final after five years since 2014. It was later revealed that Switzerland placed fourth out of the 18 participating countries in the semi-final with 232 points. In the final, Switzerland performed in position 24 and placed fourth out of the 26 participating countries, scoring 364 points.

== Background ==
Prior to the 2019 contest, Switzerland had participated in the Eurovision Song Contest fifty-nine times since its first entry in 1956. Switzerland is noted for having won the first edition of the Eurovision Song Contest with the song "Refrain" performed by Lys Assia. Their second and, to this point, most recent victory was achieved in 1988 when Canadian singer Céline Dion won the contest with the song "Ne partez pas sans moi". Following the introduction of semi-finals for the 2004, Switzerland had managed to participate in the final four times up to this point. In 2005, the internal selection of Estonian girl band Vanilla Ninja, performing the song "Cool Vibes", qualified Switzerland to the final where they placed 8th. Due to their successful result in 2005, Switzerland was pre-qualified to compete directly in the final in 2006. Between 2007 and 2010, the nation failed to qualify to the final after a string of internal selections. Since opting to organize a national final from 2011 onwards, Switzerland has managed to qualify to the final twice out of the last eight years. In 2018, Zibbz and their song "Stones" failed to qualify Switzerland to the final placing 13th in their semi-final.

The Swiss national broadcaster, Swiss Broadcasting Corporation (SRG SSR), broadcasts the event within Switzerland and organises the selection process for the nation's entry. SRG SSR confirmed their intentions to participate at the 2019 Eurovision Song Contest on 15 May 2018. Along with their participation confirmation, the broadcaster also announced that the Swiss entry for the 2019 contest would be selected internally for the first time since 2010 after Die Entscheidungsshow was dropped as part of austerity measures. Switzerland has selected their entry for the Eurovision Song Contest through both national finals and internal selections in the past. Since 2011, the broadcaster has opted to organize a national final in order to select their entry.

== Before Eurovision ==
=== Internal selection ===
SRG SSR opened a submission period between 1 September 2018 and 1 October 2018 for interested artists and composers to submit their entries. Artists and songwriters of any nationality were able to submit songs; however those with a Swiss passport or residency were given priority. In addition to the public submission, each of the four broadcasters in Switzerland: Schweizer Radio und Fernsehen (SRF), Radiotelevisione svizzera (RSI), Radio Télévision Suisse (RTS) and Radiotelevisiun Svizra Rumantscha (RTR) were also able to add up to three wildcard entries to the selection process. The RTS wildcard selection involved interested artists submitting their entries to the broadcaster between 27 July 2018 and 30 August 2018, while RSI opened a submission period between 27 July 2018 and 30 August 2018 for interested artists and composers to submit their entries for their wildcard selection.

For the RSI selection, internet voting held between 10 and 28 September 2018 among the 13 entry submissions received selected the top six songs for a regional final.

Online RSI voting — 10-28 September 2018
R/O	Artist	Song	Result
1	Davide Buzzi	"Mama"	—
2	Dianaerika Lettieri	"Amore infernale"	—
3	Iris Moné	"Lift My Soul Up"	—
4	Iris Moné	"Torno a casa"	—
5	Julie Meletta	"Mama (I Walk Alone)"	Qualified
6	Karin Cerini	"Sorry"	Qualified
7	TH3O	"One More Time"	—
8	Max Deste	"Dove finisce il giorno"	—
9	Nick Antik	"Until You Will Be Mine"	Qualified
10	Scilla Hess	"Playground"	Qualified
11	Scilla Hess	"Silence Breakers"	Qualified
12	Sebalter	"Carry the Light"	Qualified
13	Tommaso Giacopini	"Mi hai detto ama"	—

The regional final, hosted by Clarissa Tami and Axel Belloni, took place on 30 September 2018 from the RSI Studio 2 in Lugano and was broadcast via radio on RSI Rete Uno. The three entries ultimately selected as the RSI wildcards were: "Mama (I Walk Alone)" performed by Julie Meletta, "Carry the Light" performed by 2014 Swiss entrant Sebalter and "Playground" performed by Scilla Hess.

Eurovision Song Contest: Selezione Regionale (Final) — 30 September 2018
R/O	Artist	Song	Total	Place
1	Scilla Hess	"Silence Breakers"	3	4
2	Julie Meletta	"Mama (I Walk Alone)"	13	1
3	Sebalter	"Carry the Light"	12	2
4	Karin Cerini	"Sorry"	2	6
5	Scilla Hess	"Playground"	7	3
6	Nick Antik	"Until You Will Be Mine"	3	4

On 1 October 2018, SRG SSR announced that 420 entries were submitted following the submission deadline and five of the songs were shortlisted on 16 November 2018. The five songs were then tested by their music producers with various artists and the combination of a 100-member public panel (50%) and the votes of a 21-member international expert jury (50%) selected the Swiss entry. The members of the public panel were put together from 6,100 applications from Swiss residents according to selected criteria in cooperation with Digame, while the international jury consisted of members who had been national juries for their respective countries at the Eurovision Song Contest.

Members of the International Jury
Name	Country	Profession
Typh Barrow	Belgium	Singer, composer
Maria Marcus	Sweden	Music producer, songwriter
Leonid Shirin	Belarus	Composer
Mark De-Lisser	United Kingdom	Vocal coach
Rennie Mirro	Sweden	Actor
Sasha Saedi	Austria	Music manager
Alexey Gross	Belarus	Singer
Adrienn Zsédenyi	Hungary	Singer, actress, author, producer, mentor, social worker
Anders Øhrstrøm	Denmark	Singer, composer, music producer, sound designer, vocal coach
Deivydas Zvonkus	Lithuania	Composer, producer
Tinkara Kovač	Slovenia	Singer, flautist, represented Slovenia in the 2014 contest
Grzegorz Urban	Poland	Composer, arranger, pianist
Ovidiu Jacobsen	Romania	Songwriter, musician, producer, represented Romania in the 2010 and 2014 contests
Helga Möller	Iceland	Singer, represented Iceland in the 1986 contest as member of ICY
Gore Melian	Armenia	Singer, songwriter, producer
Rafailas Karpis	Lithuania	Opera singer
Danielle Spencer	Australia	Singer, actress
Argyro Christodoulidou	Cyprus	Composer, songwriter
Gordon Groothedde	Netherlands	Composer, producer
Henrik Johnsson	Sweden	Television presenter and producer
Ruth Lorenzo	Spain	Singer, songwriter, represented Spain in the 2014 contest

On 8 March 2019, "She Got Me" performed by Luca Hänni was announced as the Swiss entry for the Eurovision Song Contest 2019. Hänni had previously participated in and won the ninth season of the German reality talent show Deutschland sucht den Superstar. The official music video of the song, directed by India Rischko and Traviez The Director, was presented to the public on the same day via the official Eurovision Song Contest's YouTube channel. "She Got Me" was written by Luca Hänni together with Laurell Barker, Frazer Mac, Jon Hällgren and Lukas Hällgren.

=== Promotion ===
Luca Hänni specifically promoted "She Got Me" as the Swiss Eurovision entry on 6 April 2019 by performing during the Eurovision in Concert event which was held at the AFAS Live venue in Amsterdam, Netherlands and hosted by Edsilia Rombley and Marlayne.

== At Eurovision ==
According to Eurovision rules, all nations with the exceptions of the host country and the "Big Five" (France, Germany, Italy, Spain and the United Kingdom) are required to qualify from one of two semi-finals in order to compete for the final; the top ten countries from each semi-final progress to the final. The European Broadcasting Union (EBU) split up the competing countries into six different pots based on voting patterns from previous contests, with countries with favourable voting histories put into the same pot. On 28 January 2019, a special allocation draw was held which placed each country into one of the two semi-finals, as well as which half of the show they would perform in. Switzerland was placed into the second semi-final, to be held on 16 May 2019, and was scheduled to perform in the first half of the show.

Once all the competing songs for the 2019 contest had been released, the running order for the semi-finals was decided by the shows' producers rather than through another draw, so that similar songs were not placed next to each other. Switzerland was set to perform in position 4, following the entry from Moldova and before the entry from Latvia.

In Switzerland, three broadcasters that form SRG SSR aired the contest. Sven Epiney provided German commentary for both semi-finals airing on SRF zwei and the final airing on SRF 1. Jean-Marc Richard and Nicolas Tanner provided French commentary for the second semi-final on RTS Deux and together with Bastian Baker for the final RTS Un. Clarissa Tami and 2014 Swiss Eurovision Song Contest entrant Sebalter provided Italian commentary for the second semi-final on RSI La 2 and the final on RSI La 1. The Swiss spokesperson, who announced the top 12-point score awarded by the Swiss jury during the final, was 2012 Swiss Eurovision Song Contest entrant Sinplus.

=== Semi-final ===
Luca Hänni took part in technical rehearsals on 6 and 10 May, followed by dress rehearsals on 15 and 16 May. This included the jury show on 15 May where the professional juries of each country watched and voted on the competing entries.

The Swiss performance featured Luca Hänni performing on stage in a sleeveless black t-shirt with white shoulder trim and black trousers and boots with white trims. Hänni was flanked by four dancers all dressed in red and together performed a choreographed dance routine. The stage colours were black and red and the LED screens displayed blurred-like to laser-like thin lights that appeared from the ground. The performance also featured pyrotechnic firework effects. The four dancers that joined Luca Hänni were: Daniel Asamoah (backing vocals), David Lei Brandt (backing vocals), Hannah Levitt-Collins and Keisha von Arnold. An off-stage backing vocalist was also featured: Greg G. Curtis. The creative director of the Swiss performance was Sacha Jean-Baptiste.

At the end of the show, Switzerland was announced as having finished in the top 10 and subsequently qualifying for the grand final. This marked the third time Switzerland managed to qualify to the final, which they achieved after five years since their last qualification in 2014. It was later revealed that Switzerland placed fourth in the semi-final, receiving a total of 232 points: 137 points from the televoting and 95 points from the juries.

=== Final ===
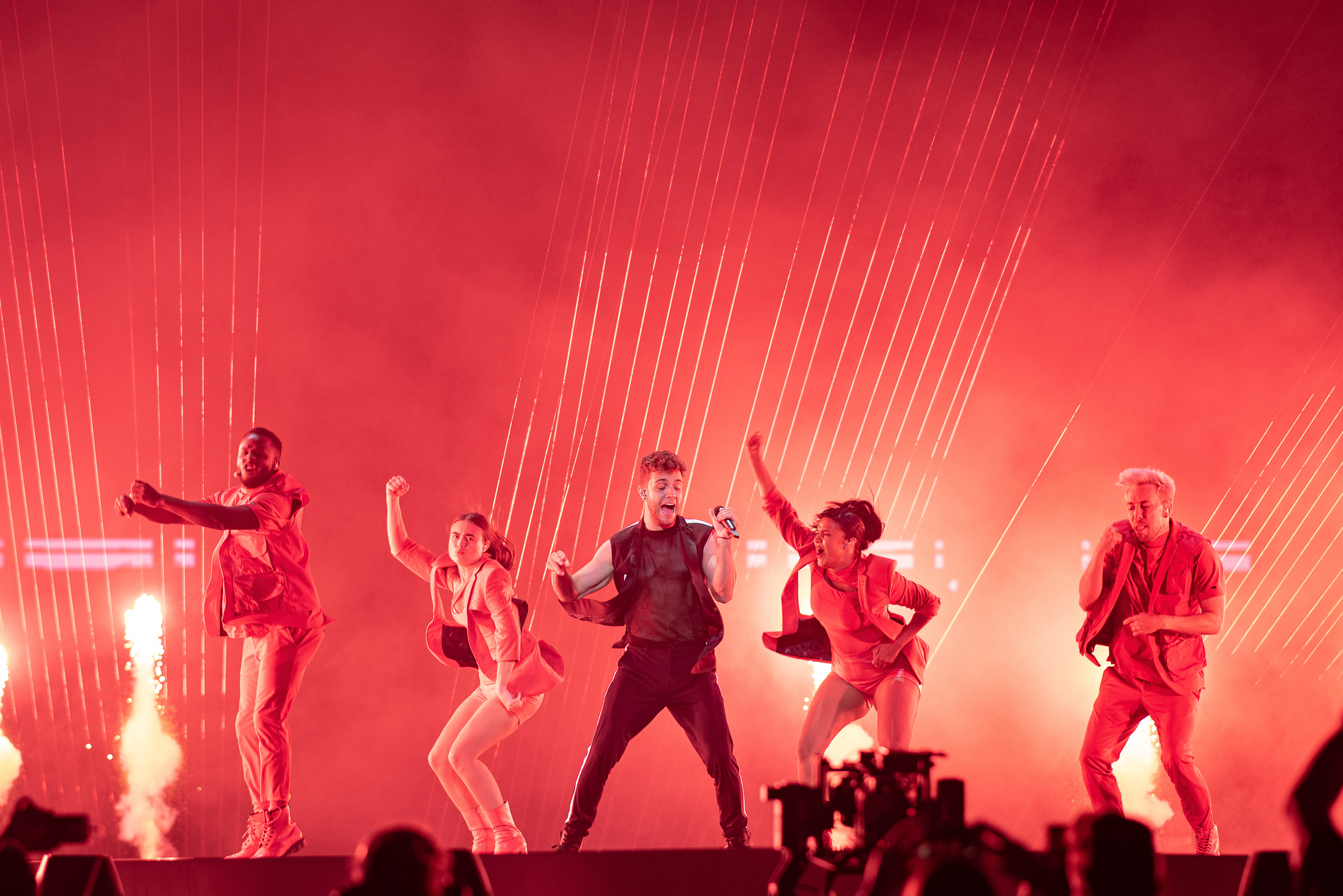
Luca Hänni during a rehearsal before the final

Shortly after the second semi-final, a winner's press conference was held for the ten qualifying countries. As part of this press conference, the qualifying artists took part in a draw to determine which half of the grand final they would subsequently participate in. This draw was done in the order the countries were announced during the semi-final. Switzerland was drawn to compete in the second half. Following this draw, the shows' producers decided upon the running order of the final, as they had done for the semi-finals. Switzerland was subsequently placed to perform in position 24, following the entry from Serbia and before the entry from Australia.

Luca Hänni once again took part in dress rehearsals on 17 and 18 May before the final, including the jury final where the professional juries cast their final votes before the live show. Luca Hänni performed a repeat of his semi-final performance during the final on 18 May. Switzerland placed fourth in the final, scoring 364 points: 212 points from the televoting and 152 points from the juries.

=== Voting ===
Voting during the three shows involved each country awarding two sets of points from 1–8, 10 and 12: one from their professional jury and the other from televoting. Each nation's jury consisted of five music industry professionals who are citizens of the country they represent, with their names published before the contest to ensure transparency. This jury judged each entry based on: vocal capacity; the stage performance; the song's composition and originality; and the overall impression by the act. In addition, no member of a national jury was permitted to be related in any way to any of the competing acts in such a way that they cannot vote impartially and independently. The individual rankings of each jury member as well as the nation's televoting results will be released shortly after the grand final.

Below is a breakdown of points awarded to Switzerland and awarded by Switzerland in the second semi-final and grand final of the contest, and the breakdown of the jury voting and televoting conducted during the two shows:

==== Points awarded to Switzerland ====
Points awarded to Switzerland (Semi-final 2)
Score	Televote	Jury
12 points	Austria; Germany; Malta	Sweden
10 points	Azerbaijan	Ireland; Croatia
8 points	Armenia; Croatia; Netherlands	Germany; Netherlands; Norway
7 points	Norway; Romania	Austria
6 points	Albania; Denmark; Ireland; Italy; Moldova; United Kingdom	Armenia
5 points		Albania; Lithuania; North Macedonia
4 points	Lithuania; Russia; Sweden	Denmark
3 points	Latvia	Romania
2 points	North Macedonia	Azerbaijan; Russia
1 point		

Points awarded to Switzerland (Final)
Score	Televote	Jury
12 points	Austria	
10 points	Germany; Romania; Spain	Albania; Austria; Estonia; Ireland; Netherlands; Sweden
8 points	Armenia; Azerbaijan; Malta	Croatia
7 points	Australia; Cyprus; Greece; Iceland; Ireland; Israel; United Kingdom	Armenia; Belgium
6 points	Croatia; Denmark; Netherlands; Norway; Serbia	Denmark; Germany; Norway
5 points	Belgium; Czech Republic; Hungary; Poland; Portugal; San Marino	Iceland; Serbia; Slovenia; United Kingdom
4 points	Albania; Belarus; Estonia; Moldova; North Macedonia; Slovenia	Belarus; Romania
3 points	Italy	Finland; Georgia; Hungary; Israel; North Macedonia; Spain
2 points	Finland; France; Lithuania; Russia	France; San Marino
1 point	Latvia; Sweden	Cyprus; Portugal

==== Points awarded by Switzerland ====
Points awarded by Switzerland (Semi-final 2)
Score	Televote	Jury
12 points	Albania	Netherlands
10 points	Norway	Sweden
8 points	Sweden	North Macedonia
7 points	North Macedonia	Latvia
6 points	Netherlands	Norway
5 points	Croatia	Moldova
4 points	Azerbaijan	Malta
3 points	Russia	Lithuania
2 points	Denmark	Denmark
1 point	Lithuania	Russia

Points awarded by Switzerland (Final)
Score	Televote	Jury
12 points	Italy	North Macedonia
10 points	Albania	Netherlands
8 points	Norway	Sweden
7 points	Serbia	Norway
6 points	Netherlands	Germany
5 points	Spain	Italy
4 points	Sweden	Australia
3 points	France	Russia
2 points	North Macedonia	France
1 point	Denmark	United Kingdom

==== Detailed voting results ====
The following members comprised the Swiss jury:

- Cyrill Camenzind (jury chairperson) – studio manager, producer
- Leticia Ribeiro de Carvalho – singer
- Eliane Müller – musician, producer
- Rocco Casella – musician, teacher, backing for Switzerland in the Eurovision Song Contest 2014
- Willy Dezelu – singer, represented Music programme responsible La Première

Detailed voting results from Switzerland (Semi-final 2)
R/O	Country	Jury							Televote	
R/O	Country	L.R. de Carvalho	C. Camenzind	E. Müller	R. Casella	W. Dezelu	Rank	Points	Rank	Points
01	Armenia	15	17	8	13	14	15		15	
02	Ireland	10	14	17	12	11	14		17	
03	Moldova	5	12	5	5	5	6	5	13	
04	Switzerland									
05	Latvia	8	5	6	7	1	4	7	16	
06	Romania	14	11	9	14	16	13		11	
07	Denmark	9	7	16	8	7	9	2	9	2
08	Sweden	1	4	3	1	3	2	10	3	8
09	Austria	17	9	10	11	15	11		12	
10	Croatia	7	16	12	17	17	12		6	5
11	Malta	6	6	14	9	8	7	4	14	
12	Lithuania	4	8	13	10	10	8	3	10	1
13	Russia	13	10	7	6	12	10	1	8	3
14	Albania	11	15	15	16	9	16		1	12
15	Norway	12	3	4	4	6	5	6	2	10
16	Netherlands	2	1	1	3	2	1	12	5	6
17	North Macedonia	3	2	2	2	4	3	8	4	7
18	Azerbaijan	16	13	11	15	13	17		7	4

Detailed voting results from Switzerland (Final)
R/O	Country	Jury							Televote	
R/O	Country	L.R. de Carvalho	C. Camenzind	E. Müller	R. Casella	W. Dezelu	Rank	Points	Rank	Points
01	Malta	11	11	20	8	15	15		20	
02	Albania	17	20	19	21	7	17		2	10
03	Czech Republic	12	9	8	9	14	11		19	
04	Germany	4	5	7	18	9	5	6	11	
05	Russia	14	12	5	5	13	8	3	14	
06	Denmark	18	13	22	7	8	13		10	1
07	San Marino	24	25	25	22	24	24		25	
08	North Macedonia	1	2	3	2	1	1	12	9	2
09	Sweden	2	3	1	1	10	3	8	7	4
10	Slovenia	23	21	21	19	18	22		16	
11	Cyprus	15	10	16	20	23	19		21	
12	Netherlands	3	1	2	4	3	2	10	5	6
13	Greece	25	24	24	25	25	25		23	
14	Israel	19	19	14	24	22	21		18	
15	Norway	5	6	4	3	5	4	7	3	8
16	United Kingdom	7	14	6	10	16	10	1	22	
17	Iceland	21	8	18	14	11	16		17	
18	Estonia	20	15	11	17	17	20		15	
19	Belarus	10	7	15	13	21	14		24	
20	Azerbaijan	16	4	13	16	12	12		12	
21	France	6	17	9	12	6	9	2	8	3
22	Italy	8	18	17	11	2	6	5	1	12
23	Serbia	13	16	10	15	20	18		4	7
24	Switzerland									
25	Australia	9	22	12	6	4	7	4	13	
26	Spain	22	23	23	23	19	23		6	5
