= Australia in the Eurovision Song Contest 2019 =

- Eurovision Song Contest 2019
- Participating broadcaster: Special Broadcasting Service (SBS)
- Country: Australia
- Selection process: Eurovision – Australia Decides
- Selection date: 9 February 2019

Competing entry
- Song: "Zero Gravity"
- Artist: Kate Miller-Heidke
- Songwriters: Kate Miller-Heidke; Keir Nuttall; Julian Hamilton

Placement
- Semi-final result: Qualified (1st, 261 points)
- Final result: 9th, 284 points

Participation chronology

Australia was represented at the Eurovision Song Contest 2019 with the song "Zero Gravity" written by Kate Miller-Heidke, Keir Nuttall and Julian Hamilton, and performed by Miller-Heidke herself. The Australian participating broadcaster, Special Broadcasting Service (SBS), organised the national final Eurovision - Australia Decides in order to select its entry for the contest. Ten artists and songs competed in the national final and the winner was selected by a public and jury vote.

Australia debuted in the Eurovision Song Contest in 2015 by invitation from the European Broadcasting Union (EBU) as a "one-off" special guest to celebrate the 60th anniversary of Eurovision. On 17 November 2015, the EBU announced that SBS had been invited to participate in the 2016 contest and that Australia would once again take part. In 2015, Australia was guaranteed a spot in the final of the contest and was allowed to vote during both semi-finals and the final; however, from the 2016 contest and onwards, Australia would have to qualify to the final from one of two semi-finals and could only vote in the semi-final in which the nation was allocated to compete.

Australia was drawn to compete in the first semi-final of the Eurovision Song Contest which took place on 14 May 2019. Performing during the show in position 12, "Zero Gravity" was announced among the top 10 entries of the first semi-final and therefore qualified to compete in the final on 18 May. It was later revealed that Australia placed first out of the 17 participating countries in the semi-final with 261 points. In the final, Australia performed in position 25 and placed ninth out of the 26 participating countries, scoring 284 points.

== Background ==
Special Broadcasting Service (SBS) has broadcast the Eurovision Song Contest since 1983, and the contest has gained a cult following over that time, primarily due to the country's strong political and cultural ties with Europe. Paying tribute to this, the 2014 contest semi-finals included an interval act featuring Australian singer Jessica Mauboy. Australian singers have also participated at Eurovision as representatives of other countries, including Olivia Newton-John (United Kingdom 1974), two-time winner Johnny Logan (Ireland 1980 and 1987), Gina G (United Kingdom 1996), and Jane Comerford as lead singer of Texas Lightning (Germany 2006).

Tying in with the goal of Eurovision—to showcase "the importance of bringing countries together to celebrate diversity, music and culture", the 2015 theme of "Building Bridges", and arguing that they could not hold "the world's biggest party" to celebrate the 60th edition of Eurovision without inviting Australia, the EBU announced on 10 February 2015 that the country would compete at that year's edition as a special guest participant. Along with the "Big Five" (France, Germany, Italy, Spain and the United Kingdom), and the host country of Austria, Australia was given automatic entry into the final to "not reduce the chances" of the semi-final participants. On 17 November 2015, the EBU announced that SBS had been invited to participate in the 2016 contest and that Australia would once again take part, however they would have to qualify for the final from one of two semi-finals and could only vote in the semi-final in which the nation was competing. On 2 October 2018, SBS confirmed Australia's participation in the 2019 Eurovision Song Contest after securing an invitation for the fifth year in a row. In 2018, Australia was represented by Jessica Mauboy and the song "We Got Love". The country ended in twentieth place in the grand final with 99 points. On 14 October 2018, SBS announced that they would hold a national final for the first time to select the Australian entry for the Eurovision Song Contest 2019.

== Before Eurovision ==
=== Eurovision – Australia Decides ===
Eurovision – Australia Decides was the national final in order to select the Australian entry for the Eurovision Song Contest 2019. The competition took place at the Convention and Exhibition Centre in Gold Coast on 9 February 2019, hosted by Myf Warhurst and Joel Creasey. Ten artists and songs competed with the winner being determined by a combination of public and jury voting. The show was broadcast on SBS as well as streamed online at SBS On Demand. The national final was watched by 298,000 viewers in Australia.

==== Competing entries ====
On 14 October 2018, SBS announced an open submission for interested songwriters to submit their songs online until 4 November 2018. Songwriters were required to be citizens or permanent residents of Australia and songs were required to be in English or an Aboriginal and Torres Strait Islander language. Minor collaborations with foreign songwriters were permitted as long as the majority of the composers/songwriters were Australian citizens or permanent residents. Over 700 songs were submitted following the deadline. Ten songs were selected for the competition from the received submissions and performers of the selected songs were determined by SBS in consultation with the songwriters. The ten competing acts were announced in three sets between 2 December 2018 and 18 January 2019.

==== Final ====
The final took place on 9 February 2019. The combination of public votes (50%) and a five-member jury (50%) selected "Zero Gravity" performed by Kate Miller-Heidke as the winner. The jury consisted of Christer Björkman (producer of Melodifestivalen and of various Eurovision Song Contests), Fifa Riccobono (former CEO of Albert Music), Milly Petriella (Artist Service director of APRA), Josh Martin (SBS Commissioning Editor for Entertainment) and Paul Clarke (Head of the Australian Eurovision Delegation) who each distributed points from 1–8, 10 and 12 during the preview show on 8 February 2019 and had a total of 290 points to award. Viewers were able to vote via SMS and the total votes were divided by 290 to determine the quota that would equal to a single point. The number of votes each song gained was then divided by the quota and rounded up to the nearest integer to determine the points an entry would be awarded. In addition to the performances of the ten competing entries, singer Casey Donovan and Dami Im, who represented Australia in 2016, performed as the interval acts.

Eurovision – Australia Decides – 9 February 2019
R/O	Artist	Song	Songwriter(s)	Jury	Televote	Total	Place
1	Ella Hooper	"Data Dust"	Alice Chance	12	6	18	10
2	Electric Fields	"2000 and Whatever"	Michael Ross, Zaachariaha Fielding	44	70	114	2
3	Mark Vincent	"This Is Not the End"	Isabella Kearney-Nurse, Mark Vincent, Roberto De Sá	19	19	38	7
4	Aydan	"Dust"	Aydan Calafiore, Cam Bluff, Dylan Joel	38	10	48	6
5	Courtney Act	"Fight for Love"	Danny Shah, Felicity Birt, Courtney Act, Sky Adams	26	26	52	4
6	Leea Nanos	"Set Me Free"	Frank Dixon, Leea Nanos	10	11	21	9
7	Sheppard	"On My Way"	George Sheppard, Amy Sheppard, Jay Bovino, Jon Hume	41	46	87	3
8	Alfie Arcuri	"To Myself"	Alfie Arcuri, Audius Mtawarira, Séb Mont	35	14	49	5
9	Kate Miller-Heidke	"Zero Gravity"	Kate Miller-Heidke, Keir Nuttall	48	87	135	1
10	Tania Doko	"Piece of Me"	Tania Doko, Christian Fast, Peter Mansson	17	6	23	8

=== Promotion ===
Prior to the Eurovision Song Contest, Kate Miller-Heidke made several appearances across Australia to promote "Zero Gravity" as the Australian Eurovision entry. On 6 April, Miller-Heidke performed during the Eurovision in Concert event which was held at the AFAS Live venue in Amsterdam, hosted by Cornald Maas and Marlayne, to over 4,500 spectators. Miller-Heidke also gave several promotional interviews to Australian media outlets prior to the competition.

== At Eurovision ==
According to Eurovision rules, all nations with the exceptions of the host country and the "Big Five" (France, Germany, Italy, Spain and the United Kingdom) are required to qualify from one of two semi-finals in order to compete for the final; the top ten countries from each semi-final progress to the final. The European Broadcasting Union (EBU) split up the competing countries into six different pots based on voting patterns from previous contests, with countries with favourable voting histories put into the same pot. On 28 January 2019, a special allocation draw was held which placed each country into one of the two semi-finals, as well as which half of the show they would perform in. Australia was placed into the first semi-final, to be held on 14 May 2019, and was scheduled to perform in the second half of the show.

Once all the competing songs for the 2019 contest had been released, the running order for the semi-finals was decided by the shows' producers rather than through another draw, so that similar songs were not placed next to each other. Australia was set to perform in position 12, following the entry from Georgia and preceding the entry from Iceland.

=== Semi-final ===
Australia performed twelfth in the first semi-final, following the entry from Georgia and preceding the entry from Iceland. At the end of the show, they were announced as one of the ten countries to qualify for the grand final, keeping their perfect qualification record intact. After the show, Kate appeared at a press conference with the other nine finalists to draw which half of the final she would participate in. Australia was drawn to compete in the second half. It was later revealed that Australia won the first semi-final, scoring 261 points, 140 points from the televoting and 121 points from the juries.

=== Voting ===
Voting during the three shows involved each country awarding two sets of points from 1–8, 10 and 12: one from their professional jury and the other from televoting. Each nation's jury consisted of five music industry professionals who are citizens of the country they represent, with their names published before the contest to ensure transparency. This jury judged each entry based on: vocal capacity; the stage performance; the song's composition and originality; and the overall impression by the act. In addition, no member of a national jury was permitted to be related in any way to any of the competing acts in such a way that they cannot vote impartially and independently. The individual rankings of each jury member as well as the nation's televoting results will be released shortly after the grand final.

==== Points awarded to Australia ====
Points awarded to Australia (Semi-final 1)
Score	Televote	Jury
12 points	Israel	Belgium; Finland; Iceland; Poland; Spain
10 points	Belarus; Belgium; Czech Republic; Iceland; Poland; Portugal	Greece
8 points	Finland; Greece	Belarus; Israel
7 points	France; Montenegro; Serbia; Spain	France
6 points	San Marino	San Marino
5 points	Estonia; Hungary	Hungary; Montenegro; Serbia
4 points	Cyprus; Slovenia	Georgia
3 points		
2 points		Portugal
1 point		Estonia

Points awarded to Australia (Final)
Score	Televote	Jury
12 points		Poland; Romania
10 points	Iceland; Ireland; United Kingdom	Finland; Germany; Iceland; Moldova; North Macedonia; Spain
8 points	Czech Republic	United Kingdom
7 points		Portugal; Serbia
6 points	Finland; France; Israel; Italy; Latvia; Poland	Italy; Sweden
5 points	Germany; Spain; Sweden	Israel
4 points	Belgium; Norway; Portugal; Russia	Belgium; France; Ireland; Montenegro; Switzerland
3 points	Austria; Greece; Malta	
2 points	Belarus; Cyprus; Denmark; Estonia; Netherlands; Romania; Slovenia	Albania; Azerbaijan; Greece; Lithuania; Netherlands
1 point	Albania; Armenia; Lithuania	

==== Points awarded by Australia ====
Points awarded by Australia (Semi-final 1)
Score	Televote	Jury
12 points	Iceland	Czech Republic
10 points	Czech Republic	Iceland
8 points	Greece	Poland
7 points	Estonia	Greece
6 points	San Marino	Hungary
5 points	Poland	Georgia
4 points	Portugal	Slovenia
3 points	Cyprus	Serbia
2 points	Belarus	Finland
1 point	Hungary	San Marino

Points awarded by Australia (Final)
Score	Televote	Jury
12 points	Norway	Sweden
10 points	Iceland	France
8 points	Sweden	Iceland
7 points	Switzerland	North Macedonia
6 points	Netherlands	Netherlands
5 points	Italy	Czech Republic
4 points	Malta	Russia
3 points	France	Germany
2 points	Czech Republic	Azerbaijan
1 point	Azerbaijan	Serbia

==== Detailed voting results ====
The following members comprised the Australian jury:

- Mark Cummins (jury chairperson) – broadcaster
- Christine Anu – singer, songwriter, radio DJ
- Alice Chance – composer
- Mark Humphries – entertainment professional actor, writer
- Lewis Hobba – radio DJ, comedian

Detailed voting results from Australia (Semi-final 1)
R/O	Country	Jury							Televote	
R/O	Country	C. Anu	A. Chance	M. Cummins	M. Humphries	L. Hobba	Rank	Points	Rank	Points
01	Cyprus	5	13	8	14	9	12		8	3
02	Montenegro	13	9	4	12	13	14		16	
03	Finland	10	4	9	9	10	9	2	13	
04	Poland	11	1	11	7	1	3	8	6	5
05	Slovenia	15	14	1	2	12	7	4	11	
06	Czech Republic	8	6	3	1	6	1	12	2	10
07	Hungary	6	2	6	4	7	5	6	10	1
08	Belarus	9	15	14	16	11	15		9	2
09	Serbia	2	10	7	13	4	8	3	12	
10	Belgium	16	8	12	3	14	11		14	
11	Georgia	7	3	10	10	2	6	5	15	
12	Australia									
13	Iceland	1	5	16	5	3	2	10	1	12
14	Estonia	12	16	13	15	16	16		4	7
15	Portugal	14	11	5	11	8	13		7	4
16	Greece	3	7	2	8	5	4	7	3	8
17	San Marino	4	12	15	6	15	10	1	5	6

Detailed voting results from Australia (Final)
R/O	Country	Jury							Televote	
R/O	Country	C. Anu	A. Chance	M. Cummins	M. Humphries	L. Hobba	Rank	Points	Rank	Points
01	Malta	20	8	18	16	12	18		7	4
02	Albania	14	14	24	21	20	21		23	
03	Czech Republic	13	13	11	1	6	6	5	9	2
04	Germany	12	2	12	24	19	8	3	25	
05	Russia	11	9	10	9	5	7	4	16	
06	Denmark	21	12	13	6	16	17		17	
07	San Marino	25	21	25	11	24	22		18	
08	North Macedonia	4	4	14	5	4	4	7	13	
09	Sweden	3	3	1	2	2	1	12	3	8
10	Slovenia	22	17	19	8	25	19		24	
11	Cyprus	16	23	20	14	11	20		14	
12	Netherlands	5	5	2	13	15	5	6	5	6
13	Greece	15	16	3	22	10	11		15	
14	Israel	8	10	8	18	13	13		20	
15	Norway	10	11	15	4	21	12		1	12
16	United Kingdom	17	22	22	20	17	24		22	
17	Iceland	2	6	16	7	1	3	8	2	10
18	Estonia	24	25	23	25	23	25		12	
19	Belarus	19	24	21	19	14	23		21	
20	Azerbaijan	9	15	4	10	18	9	2	10	1
21	France	1	1	9	3	3	2	10	8	3
22	Italy	7	7	17	15	22	16		6	5
23	Serbia	6	19	7	23	7	10	1	19	
24	Switzerland	23	18	5	17	8	14		4	7
25	Australia									
26	Spain	18	20	6	12	9	15		11	
