= Italy in the Eurovision Song Contest 2019 =

- Eurovision Song Contest 2019
- Participating broadcaster: Radiotelevisione italiana (RAI)
- Country: Italy
- Selection process: Sanremo Music Festival 2019
- Selection date: 9 February 2019

Competing entry
- Song: "Soldi"
- Artist: Mahmood
- Songwriters: Charlie Charles; Dario "Dardust" Faini; Alessandro Mahmoud

Placement
- Final result: 2nd, 472 points

Participation chronology

Italy was represented at the Eurovision Song Contest 2019 with the song "Soldi", written by Charlie Charles, Dario "Dardust" Faini, and Alessandro Mahmoud, and performed by Mahmoud himself under his stage name Mahmood. The Italian participating broadcaster, Radiotelevisione italiana (RAI), announced in November 2018 that the winning performer(s) of the Sanremo Music Festival 2019 would earn the right to represent Italy at the contest.

== Background ==
Prior to the 2019 contest, Radiotelevisione italiana (RAI) had participated in the Eurovision Song Contest representing Italy forty-four times since its first entry during the inaugural contest in 1956. Since then, it has won the contest on two occasions: in 1964 with the song "Non ho l'età" performed by Gigliola Cinquetti, and in 1990 with "Insieme: 1992" by Toto Cutugno. RAI has withdrawn from the contest a number of times with its most recent absence spanning from 1998 until 2010. Their return in 2011 with the song "Madness of Love", performed by Raphael Gualazzi, placed second—their highest result, to this point, since their victory in 1990. In 2018, "Non mi avete fatto niente" performed by Ermal Meta and Fabrizio Moro, placed fifth with 308 points.

As part of its duties as participating broadcaster, RAI organises the selection of its entry in the Eurovision Song Contest and broadcasts the event in the country. The broadcaster confirmed its participation in the 2019 contest on 5 October 2018. Between 2011 and 2013, RAI used the Sanremo Music Festival as an artist selection pool where a special committee would select one of the competing artist, independent of the results in the competition, as the Eurovision entrant. The selected entrant was then responsible for selecting the song they would compete with. For 2014, RAI forwent using the Sanremo Music Festival artist lineup and internally selected its entry. Since 2015, the winning artist of the Sanremo Music Festival is rewarded with the opportunity to represent Italy at the Eurovision Song Contest, although in 2016 the winner declined and RAI appointed the runner-up as the Italian entrant.

== Before Eurovision ==
=== Sanremo Music Festival 2019 ===
On 20 November 2018, RAI confirmed that the performer that would represent Italy at the Eurovision Song Contest 2019 would be selected from the competing artists at the Sanremo Music Festival 2019. According to the rules of Sanremo 2019, the winner of the festival earns the right to represent Italy at the Eurovision Song Contest, but in case the artist is not available or refuses the offer, the organisers of the event reserve the right to choose another participant via their own criteria. The competition took place between 5–9 February 2019 with the winner being selected on the last day of the festival.

Twenty four artists competed in Sanremo 2019. Two of the twenty four competing artists (Einar and Mahmood respectively) were selected in the standalone Sanremo Newcomers competition that was held in December 2018. Among the competing artists were former Eurovision entrants Il Volo, who represented Italy in 2015. The performers were:

Artist	Song	Songwriter(s)
Achille Lauro	"Rolls Royce"	Achille Lauro, Davide Petrella, Daniele Deizi, Daniele Mungai, Edoardo Manozzi
Anna Tatangelo	"Le nostre anime di notte"	Lorenzo Vizzini
Arisa	"Mi sento bene"	Alessandra Flora, Matteo Buzzanca, Lorenzo Vizzini, Rosalba Pippa
Boomdabash	"Per un milione"	Federica Abbate, Cheope, Rocco Pagliarulo, Angelo Cisternino, Alessandro Merli, Fabio Clemente
Daniele Silvestri	"Argentovivo"	Daniele Silvestri, Tarek "Rancore" Iurcich, Fabio Rondanini, Manuel Agnelli
Einar	"Parole nuove"	Tony Maiello, Enrico Palmosi, Nicola Marotta
Enrico Nigiotti	"Nonno Hollywood"	Enrico Nigiotti
Ex-Otago	"Solo una canzone"	Maurizio Carucci, Simone Bertuccini, Olmo Martellacci, Francesco Bacci, Rachid Bouchabla
Federica Carta and Shade	"Senza farlo apposta"	Jacopo Ettore, Giacomo Roggia, Vito "Shade" Ventura
Francesco Renga	"Aspetto che torni"	Bungaro, Francesco Renga, Cesare Chiodo, Rakele, Giacomo Runco
Ghemon	"Rose viola"	Giovanni Luca Picariello, Stefano Tognini
Il Volo	"Musica che resta"	Antonello Carozza, Emilio Munda, Gianna Nannini, Pasquale Mammaro, Piero Romitelli
Irama	"La ragazza con il cuore di latta"	Giuseppe Colonnelli, Andrea Debernardi, Filippo Maria Fanti, Giulio Nenna
Loredana Bertè	"Cosa ti aspetti da me"	Gaetano Curreri, Gerardo Pulli, Piero Romitelli
Motta	"Dov'è l'Italia"	Francesco Motta
Mahmood	"Soldi"	Charlie Charles, Dario "Dardust" Faini, Alessandro Mahmoud
Negrita	"I ragazzi stanno bene"	Paolo Bruni, Cesare Petricich, Enrico Salvi, Guglielmo Ridolfo Gagliano, Lorenzo Cilembrini, Francesco Barbacci
Nek	"Mi farò trovare pronto"	Filippo Neviani, Luca Chiaravalli, Paolo Antonacci
Nino D'Angelo and Livio Cori	"Un'altra luce"	Nino D'Angelo, Livio Cori, Big Fish, Francesco Fogliano, Mario Fracchiolla
Paola Turci	"L'ultimo ostacolo"	Edwyn Roberts, Stefano Marletta, Luca Chiaravalli, Paola Turci
Patty Pravo feat. Briga	"Un po' come la vita"	Zibba, Marco Rettani, Diego Calvetti, Mattia "Briga" Bellegrandi, Luca Lenori
Simone Cristicchi	"Abbi cura di me"	Simone Cristicchi, Nicola Brunialti, Gabriele Ortenzi
Ultimo	"I tuoi particolari"	Niccolò Moriconi
Zen Circus	"L'amore è una dittatura"	Andre Appino, Massimiliano Schiavelli, Karim Qqru

==== Final ====
The 24 Big Artists each performed their entry again for a final time on 9 February 2019. A combination of public televoting (50%), press jury voting (30%) and expert jury voting (20%) selected the top three to face a superfinal vote, then the winner of Sanremo 2019 was decided. Mahmood was declared the winner of the contest with the song "Soldi". During the press conference that followed the final, Mahmood accepted to compete in the Eurovision Song Contest. However, in an interview to La Stampa published on 11 February 2019, Mahmood stated that he was reconsidering his acceptance as he and his management had to consider "how much work it entails". Finally, on 12 February 2019, Mahmood confirmed his participation at the Eurovision Song Contest via his social media.

Final – 9 February 2019
R/O	Artist	Song	Expert Jury (20%)	Press Jury (30%)	Televote (50%)	Average	Place
1	Daniele Silvestri	"Argentovivo"	2	3	9	5.87%	6
2	Anna Tatangelo	"Le nostre anime di notte"	18	18	18	1.08%	22
3	Ghemon	"Rose viola"	5	9	17	3.16%	12
4	Negrita	"I ragazzi stanno bene"	10	18	21	1.55%	20
5	Ultimo	"I tuoi particolari"	7	6	1	12.92%	2
6	Nek	"Mi farò trovare pronto"	17	20	14	1.49%	19
7	Loredana Bertè	"Cosa ti aspetti da me"	6	1	3	10.35%	4
8	Francesco Renga	"Aspetto che torni"	18	17	13	1.65%	15
9	Mahmood	"Soldi"	1	2	7	13.30%	1
10	Ex-Otago	"Sola una canzone"	8	11	16	2.58%	13
11	Il Volo	"Musica che resta"	21	13	2	9.48%	3
12	Paola Turci	"L'ultimo ostacolo"	9	16	15	2.11%	16
13	Zen Circus	"L'amore è una dittatura"	12	12	19	1.75%	17
14	Patty Pravo feat. Briga	"Un po' come la vita"	18	21	22	0.85%	21
15	Arisa	"Mi sento bene"	3	4	12	4.95%	8
16	Irama	"La ragazza con il cuore di latta"	12	10	4	5.60%	7
17	Achille Lauro	"Rolls Royce"	12	7	8	4.09%	9
18	Nino D'Angelo and Livio Cori	"Un'altra luce"	21	23	20	0.72%	24
19	Federica Carta and Shade	"Senza farlo apposta"	21	21	11	1.52%	18
20	Simone Cristicchi	"Abbi cura di me"	12	4	5	6.01%	5
21	Enrico Nigiotti	"Nonno Hollywood"	12	8	6	3.53%	10
22	Boomdabash	"Per un milione"	11	15	10	2.55%	11
23	Einar	"Parole nuove"	21	23	23	0.68%	23
24	Motta	"Dov'e l'Italia"	4	14	24	2.23%	14

Superfinal – 9 February 2019
R/O	Artist	Song	Jury (50%)	Televote (50%)	Total	Place
1	Ultimo	"I tuoi particolari"	24.7%	48.80%	35.6%	2
2	Il Volo	"Musica che resta"	11.6%	30.26%	25.5%	3
3	Mahmood	"Soldi"	63.7%	20.95%	38.9%	1

== At Eurovision ==
The Eurovision Song Contest 2019 took place at Expo Tel Aviv in Tel Aviv, Israel and consisted of two semi-finals on 14 and 16 May and the final on 18 May 2019. According to Eurovision rules, all nations with the exceptions of the host country and the "Big Five" (France, Germany, Italy, Spain and the United Kingdom) are required to qualify from one of two semi-finals in order to compete for the final; the top ten countries from each semi-final progress to the final. As a member of the "Big Five", Italy automatically qualified to compete in the final. In addition to their participation in the final, Italy is also required to broadcast and vote in one of the two semi-finals (the second one this year).

=== Voting ===
Voting during the three shows involved each country awarding two sets of points from 1–8, 10 and 12: one from their professional jury and the other from televoting. Each nation's jury consisted of five music industry professionals who are citizens of the country they represent, with their names published before the contest to ensure transparency. This jury judged each entry based on: vocal capacity; the stage performance; the song's composition and originality; and the overall impression by the act. In addition, no member of a national jury was permitted to be related in any way to any of the competing acts in such a way that they cannot vote impartially and independently. The individual rankings of each jury member, as well as the nation's televoting results, were released shortly after the grand final.

==== Points awarded to Italy ====
Points awarded to Italy (Final)
Score	Televote	Jury
12 points	Croatia; Malta; Spain; Switzerland	Belgium; Croatia; Germany; Malta; North Macedonia; San Marino
10 points	Austria; France; Greece; Lithuania; Netherlands	Israel; Serbia
8 points	Albania; Belgium; Cyprus; Israel; Romania; San Marino; Slovenia	Armenia; Cyprus; Czech Republic; France; Slovenia; Sweden
7 points	Armenia; Norway; Poland; Portugal; Serbia	Austria; Belarus; Greece; Hungary
6 points	Azerbaijan; Germany; Iceland	Netherlands; Portugal
5 points	Australia; Moldova; Montenegro	Albania; Azerbaijan; Finland; Switzerland
4 points	Hungary; Ireland; Sweden	Spain
3 points	Belarus; Denmark; Finland; Latvia; North Macedonia	Iceland; Lithuania; Norway
2 points	Czech Republic	Latvia; Montenegro
1 point	Georgia; Russia	Denmark; Ireland

==== Points awarded by Italy ====
Points awarded by Italy (Semi-final 2)
Score	Televote	Jury
12 points	Albania	Denmark
10 points	Romania	Malta
8 points	Norway	Ireland
7 points	Russia	North Macedonia
6 points	Switzerland	Azerbaijan
5 points	Moldova	Latvia
4 points	Azerbaijan	Netherlands
3 points	Netherlands	Albania
2 points	Malta	Romania
1 point	North Macedonia	Austria

Points awarded by Italy (Final)
Score	Televote	Jury
12 points	Albania	Denmark
10 points	Norway	North Macedonia
8 points	Russia	Malta
7 points	Iceland	Azerbaijan
6 points	Australia	Australia
5 points	Netherlands	Estonia
4 points	Denmark	Czech Republic
3 points	Switzerland	France
2 points	France	Sweden
1 point	Azerbaijan	Albania

==== Detailed voting results ====
The following members comprised the Italian jury:

- Elisabetta Esposito (jury chairperson) – journalist
- Annie Mazzola – digital entertainer
- Mauro Severoni – audio engineer manager
- Adriano Pennini – maestro (jury member in semi-final 2)
- Stefania Zizzari (jury member in the final)
- Paolo Biamonte – journalist

Detailed voting results from Italy (Semi-final 2)
R/O	Country	Jury							Televote	
R/O	Country	E. Esposito	A. Mazzola	M. Severoni	A. Pennini	P. Biamonte	Rank	Points	Rank	Points
01	Armenia	7	8	9	12	12	12		15	
02	Ireland	3	9	2	4	1	3	8	16	
03	Moldova	12	10	4	11	16	11		6	5
04	Switzerland	16	12	16	10	11	15		5	6
05	Latvia	2	11	10	5	14	6	5	17	
06	Romania	11	6	7	8	10	9	2	2	10
07	Denmark	1	3	1	3	8	1	12	11	
08	Sweden	13	5	12	13	13	13		14	
09	Austria	14	18	13	14	2	10	1	18	
10	Croatia	17	17	18	18	17	18		13	
11	Malta	4	1	3	2	6	2	10	9	2
12	Lithuania	8	15	15	16	7	14		12	
13	Russia	18	14	11	15	18	16		4	7
14	Albania	6	13	6	9	5	8	3	1	12
15	Norway	15	16	17	17	15	17		3	8
16	Netherlands	9	7	14	6	3	7	4	8	3
17	North Macedonia	5	2	8	1	9	4	7	10	1
18	Azerbaijan	10	4	5	7	4	5	6	7	4

Detailed voting results from Italy (Final)
R/O	Country	Jury							Televote	
R/O	Country	E. Esposito	A. Mazzola	M. Severoni	S. Zizzari	P. Biamonte	Rank	Points	Rank	Points
01	Malta	3	1	2	7	6	3	8	16	
02	Albania	16	10	6	13	7	10	1	1	12
03	Czech Republic	5	6	17	6	8	7	4	22	
04	Germany	17	20	19	17	10	18		25	
05	Russia	23	21	14	22	24	23		3	8
06	Denmark	1	3	1	3	1	1	12	7	4
07	San Marino	25	25	22	24	25	25		21	
08	North Macedonia	2	2	5	2	3	2	10	12	
09	Sweden	7	4	13	5	17	9	2	17	
10	Slovenia	20	22	8	20	19	16		18	
11	Cyprus	12	19	15	16	20	19		20	
12	Netherlands	11	13	12	15	9	12		6	5
13	Greece	24	23	10	18	12	15		23	
14	Israel	10	14	18	8	13	11		15	
15	Norway	14	15	24	9	15	13		2	10
16	United Kingdom	19	16	20	19	21	22		24	
17	Iceland	21	18	11	25	23	21		4	7
18	Estonia	6	5	9	4	11	6	5	14	
19	Belarus	13	11	23	12	18	14		19	
20	Azerbaijan	8	7	4	1	5	4	7	10	1
21	France	9	8	7	11	4	8	3	9	2
22	Italy									
23	Serbia	15	17	16	21	16	20		13	
24	Switzerland	18	12	21	14	14	17		8	3
25	Australia	4	9	3	10	2	5	6	5	6
26	Spain	22	24	25	23	22	24		11	
