= Sweden in the Eurovision Song Contest 2019 =

- Eurovision Song Contest 2019
- Participating broadcaster: Sveriges Television (SVT)
- Country: Sweden
- Selection process: Melodifestivalen 2019
- Selection date: 9 March 2019

Competing entry
- Song: "Too Late for Love"
- Artist: John Lundvik
- Songwriters: John Lundvik; Anderz Wrethov; Andreas Stone Johansson

Placement
- Semi-final result: Qualified (3rd, 238 points)
- Final result: 5th, 334 points

Participation chronology

Sweden was represented at the Eurovision Song Contest 2019 with the song "Too Late for Love", written by John Lundvik, Anderz Wrethov, and Andreas Stone Johansson, and performed by Lundvik himself. The Swedish participating broadcaster, Sveriges Television (SVT), organised the national final Melodifestivalen 2019 in order to select its entry for the contest. After a six-week-long competition consisting of four heats, a Second Chance round and a final, "Too Late for Love" performed by John Lundvik emerged as the winner after achieving the highest score following the combination of votes from eight international juries and a public vote.

== Background ==
Prior to the 2019 contest, Sveriges Radio (SR) until 1979, and Sveriges Television (SVT) since 1980, had participated in the Eurovision Song Contest representing Sweden fifty-eight times since SR's first entry in 1958. Sweden had won the contest on six occasions: in 1974 with the song "Waterloo" performed by ABBA, in 1984 with the song "Diggi-Loo Diggi-Ley" performed by Herreys, in 1991 with the song "Fångad av en stormvind" performed by Carola, in 1999 with the song "Take Me to Your Heaven" performed by Charlotte Nilsson, in 2012 with the song "Euphoria" performed by Loreen, and in 2015 with the song "Heroes" performed by Måns Zelmerlöw. Following the introduction of semi-finals for the 2004, Sweden's entries, to this point, have featured in every final except for 2010 when the nation failed to qualify.

As part of its duties as participating broadcaster, SVT organises the selection of its entry in the Eurovision Song Contest and broadcasts the event in the country. Since 1959, SR first and SVT later have organised the annual competition Melodifestivalen in order to select their entries for the contest.

== Before Eurovision ==
=== Melodifestivalen 2019 ===
Melodifestivalen 2019 was the 58th edition of the Swedish music competition Melodifestivalen, held between 2 February 2019 and 9 March 2019. The four presenters were Sarah Dawn Finer, Kodjo Akolor, Marika Carlsson and Eric Saade. The winner of the contest would represent Sweden in the Eurovision Song Contest 2019 in Tel Aviv, Israel.

==== Heats and Second Chance round ====
- The first heat took place on 2 February 2019 at the Scandinavium in Gothenburg. "Not with Me" performed by Wiktoria and "Hello" performed by Mohombi qualified directly to the final, while "Ashes to Ashes" performed by Anna Bergendahl and "Chasing Rivers" performed by Nano advanced to the Second Chance round. "No Drama" performed by High15, "Mina bränder" performed by Zeana featuring Anis don Demina, and "Mina fyra årstider" performed by Arja Saijonmaa were eliminated from the contest.
- The second heat took place on 9 February 2019 at the Malmö Arena in Malmö. "Hold You" performed by Hanna Ferm and Liamoo and "I Do Me" performed by Malou Prytz qualified directly to the final, while "Nakna i regnet" performed by Vlad Reiser and "Army of Us" performed by Andreas Johnson advanced to the Second Chance round. "I Love It" performed by Oscar Enestad, "Leva livet" performed by Jan Malmsjö, and "Tempo" performed by Margaret were eliminated from the contest.
- The third heat took place on 16 February 2019 at the Tegera Arena in Leksand. "Norrsken (Goeksegh)" performed by Jon Henrik Fjällgren and "Victorious" performed by Lina Hedlund qualified directly to the final, while "Who I Am" performed by Rebecka Karlsson and "Låt skiten brinna" performed by Martin Stenmarck advanced to the Second Chance round. "Somebody Wants" performed by the Lovers of Valdaro, "Habibi" performed by Dolly Style, and "Om om och om igen" performed by Omar Rudberg were eliminated from the contest.
- The fourth heat took place on 23 February 2019 at the Sparbanken Lidköping Arena in Lidköping. "Too Late for Love" performed by John Lundvik and "On My Own" performed by Bishara qualified directly to the final, while "Torn" performed by Lisa Ajax and "I Do" performed by Arvingarna advanced to the Second Chance round. "Stormbringer" performed by Pagan Fury, "Känner dig" performed by Anton Hagman, and "Kärleken finns kvar" performed by Ann-Louise Hanson were eliminated from the contest.
- The Second Chance round (Andra chansen) took place on 2 March 2019 at the Rosvalla Nyköping Eventcenter in Nyköping. "Ashes to Ashes" performed by Anna Bergendahl, "Chasing Rivers" performed by Nano, "Torn" performed by Lisa Ajax, and "I Do" performed by Arvingarna qualified to the final.

==== Final ====
The final took place on 9 March 2019 at the Friends Arena in Solna, Stockholm. Twelve songs competed—two qualifiers from each of the four preceding heats and four qualifiers from the Second Chance round. The combination of points from a viewer vote and eight international jury groups determined the winner, John Lundvik with the song "Too Late for Love". The viewers and the juries each had a total of 464 points to award. The nations that comprised the international jury were Australia, Austria, Cyprus, Finland, France, Israel, Portugal and the United Kingdom.

R/O	Artist	Song	Juries	Televote	Total	Place
1	Jon Henrik Fjällgren	"Norrsken (Goeksegh)"	19	55	74	4
2	Lisa Ajax	"Torn"	39	23	62	9
3	Mohombi	"Hello"	32	42	74	5
4	Lina Hedlund	"Victorious"	32	8	40	11
5	Bishara	"On My Own"	38	69	107	2
6	Anna Bergendahl	"Ashes to Ashes"	20	36	56	10
7	Nano	"Chasing Rivers"	54	10	64	8
8	Hanna Ferm and Liamoo	"Hold You"	48	59	107	3
9	Malou Prytz	"I Do Me"	23	12	35	12
10	John Lundvik	"Too Late for Love"	96	85	181	1
11	Wiktoria	"Not with Me"	36	28	64	6
12	Arvingarna	"I Do"	27	37	64	7

== At Eurovision ==
According to Eurovision rules, all nations with the exceptions of the host country and the "Big Five" (France, Germany, Italy, Spain and the United Kingdom) are required to qualify from one of two semi-finals in order to compete for the final; the top ten countries from each semi-final progress to the final. The European Broadcasting Union (EBU) split up the competing countries into six different pots based on voting patterns from previous contests, with countries with favourable voting histories put into the same pot. On 28 January 2019, a special allocation draw was held which placed each country into one of the two semi-finals, as well as which half of the show they would perform in. Sweden was placed into the second semi-final, to be held on 16 May 2019, and was scheduled to perform in the first half of the show.

Once all the competing songs for the 2019 contest had been released, the running order for the semi-finals was decided by the shows' producers rather than through another draw, so that similar songs were not placed next to each other. Sweden was set to perform in position 8, following the entry from Denmark and preceding the entry from Austria.

=== Semi-final ===
Sweden performed eighth in the second semi-final, following the entry from Denmark and preceding the entry from Austria. At the end of the show, Sweden was announced as having finished in the top 10 and subsequently qualifying for the grand final. It was later revealed that Sweden placed third in the semi-final, receiving a total of 238 points: 88 points from the televoting and 150 points from the juries.

=== Voting ===
Voting during the three shows involved each country awarding two sets of points from 1-8, 10 and 12: one from their professional jury and the other from televoting. Each nation's jury consisted of five music industry professionals who are citizens of the country they represent, with their names published before the contest to ensure transparency. This jury judged each entry based on: vocal capacity; the stage performance; the song's composition and originality; and the overall impression by the act. In addition, no member of a national jury was permitted to be related in any way to any of the competing acts in such a way that they cannot vote impartially and independently. The individual rankings of each jury member as well as the nation's televoting results were released shortly after the grand final.

==== Points awarded to Sweden ====
Points awarded to Sweden (Semi-final 2)
Score	Televote	Jury
12 points		Armenia; Austria; Denmark; Ireland; Latvia; Netherlands; Norway
10 points	Denmark; Netherlands; Norway	Lithuania; Malta; Switzerland; United Kingdom
8 points	Switzerland	
7 points	Malta	Albania; Germany
6 points		
5 points	Germany; Ireland; Lithuania	
4 points	Albania; Armenia; Croatia; Latvia; United Kingdom	Croatia; North Macedonia; Romania
3 points	Azerbaijan	
2 points	Russia	
1 point	Austria; North Macedonia; Romania	

Points awarded to Sweden (Final)
Score	Televote	Jury
12 points	Norway	Armenia; Australia; Czech Republic; Denmark; Estonia; Finland; Iceland; Ireland; Netherlands; Spain
10 points	Denmark	France; Latvia; United Kingdom
8 points	Australia; Iceland; Netherlands	Lithuania; Norway; Serbia; Switzerland
7 points	Finland	Cyprus; Slovenia
6 points	Georgia; Malta; Spain	Albania; Austria; Israel
5 points	United Kingdom	Croatia; Malta
4 points	Switzerland	Hungary
3 points	Estonia; Lithuania	
2 points	Armenia; Belgium; Ireland	Belarus; Georgia; Germany; Italy; Moldova; Portugal
1 point	Germany	Romania

==== Points awarded by Sweden ====
Points awarded by Sweden (Semi-final 2)
Score	Televote	Jury
12 points	Norway	Switzerland
10 points	Denmark	Netherlands
8 points	Azerbaijan	Austria
7 points	Lithuania	Russia
6 points	North Macedonia	Moldova
5 points	Netherlands	Norway
4 points	Switzerland	Malta
3 points	Russia	Lithuania
2 points	Albania	Denmark
1 point	Croatia	Azerbaijan

Points awarded by Sweden (Final)
Score	Televote	Jury
12 points	Norway	Netherlands
10 points	Estonia	Switzerland
8 points	Iceland	Italy
7 points	Denmark	Cyprus
6 points	Netherlands	Australia
5 points	Australia	Azerbaijan
4 points	Italy	Norway
3 points	Azerbaijan	Russia
2 points	North Macedonia	Malta
1 point	Switzerland	Czech Republic

==== Detailed voting results ====
The following members comprised the Swedish jury:

- Calvin Bozic (jury chairperson) – PR and project leader record company
- Mathias Lugoboni – assistant music director
- Lina Hedlund – artist
- Adnan Sahuric – dancer and choreographer
- Haida Jamshidi

Detailed voting results from Sweden (Semi-final 2)
R/O	Country	Jury							Televote	
R/O	Country	C. Bozic	M. Lugoboni	L. Hedlund	A. Sahuric	H. Jamshidi	Rank	Points	Rank	Points
01	Armenia	7	15	6	11	14	16		11	
02	Ireland	8	14	3	16	17	13		16	
03	Moldova	6	12	10	3	5	5	6	14	
04	Switzerland	1	10	16	1	1	1	12	7	4
05	Latvia	11	11	8	15	16	17		15	
06	Romania	13	13	4	9	15	15		13	
07	Denmark	10	3	11	13	6	9	2	2	10
08	Sweden									
09	Austria	4	7	1	14	8	3	8	17	
10	Croatia	14	17	13	7	4	14		10	1
11	Malta	3	16	14	4	10	7	4	12	
12	Lithuania	12	5	5	8	9	8	3	4	7
13	Russia	2	6	15	12	3	4	7	8	3
14	Albania	15	9	2	17	13	11		9	2
15	Norway	9	2	12	10	7	6	5	1	12
16	Netherlands	5	1	17	2	2	2	10	6	5
17	North Macedonia	17	8	7	6	12	12		5	6
18	Azerbaijan	16	4	9	5	11	10	1	3	8

Detailed voting results from Sweden (Final)
R/O	Country	Jury							Televote	
R/O	Country	C. Bozic	M. Lugoboni	L. Hedlund	A. Sahuric	H. Jamshidi	Rank	Points	Rank	Points
01	Malta	5	19	9	5	20	9	2	19	
02	Albania	24	20	25	24	24	25		13	
03	Czech Republic	3	15	18	7	19	10	1	18	
04	Germany	15	18	23	17	22	22		24	
05	Russia	10	14	8	12	3	8	3	12	
06	Denmark	12	7	16	11	12	16		4	7
07	San Marino	11	23	24	22	21	20		22	
08	North Macedonia	20	13	3	19	8	11		9	2
09	Sweden									
10	Slovenia	19	12	4	13	25	15		14	
11	Cyprus	4	10	10	1	15	4	7	20	
12	Netherlands	2	1	1	3	2	1	12	5	6
13	Greece	23	22	20	18	14	23		21	
14	Israel	22	17	21	21	13	21		23	
15	Norway	21	4	11	10	5	7	4	1	12
16	United Kingdom	6	11	22	6	18	13		16	
17	Iceland	25	24	12	25	23	24		3	8
18	Estonia	13	16	13	9	4	12		2	10
19	Belarus	18	21	19	15	10	19		25	
20	Azerbaijan	9	9	5	8	7	6	5	8	3
21	France	14	6	14	14	16	17		11	
22	Italy	8	2	6	2	9	3	8	7	4
23	Serbia	16	25	15	16	11	18		15	
24	Switzerland	1	8	2	4	1	2	10	10	1
25	Australia	7	5	7	20	6	5	6	6	5
26	Spain	17	3	17	23	17	14		17	
