= Russia in the Eurovision Song Contest 2019 =

- Eurovision Song Contest 2019
- Country: Russia
- Selection process: Internal selection
- Announcement date: Artist: 7 February 2019; Song: 9 March 2019

Competing entry
- Song: "Scream"
- Artist: Sergey Lazarev
- Songwriters: Philipp Kirkorov; Dimitris Kontopoulos; Sharon Vaughn

Placement
- Semi-final result: Qualified (6th, 217 points)
- Final result: 3rd, 370 points

Participation chronology

Russia was represented at the Eurovision Song Contest 2019 with the song "Scream", written by Philipp Kirkorov, Dimitris Kontopoulos and Sharon Vaughn. The song was performed by Sergey Lazarev, who was internally selected by the Russian broadcaster Russia-1 to represent the nation at the 2019 contest in Tel Aviv, Israel.

== Background ==
Prior to the 2019 contest, Russia had participated in the Eurovision Song Contest 21 times since its first entry in 1994. Russia had won the contest on one occasion in 2008 with the song "Believe" performed by Dima Bilan. In 2016, Russia finished third with the song "You Are the Only One" performed by Russia's 2019 entrant Sergey Lazarev. In 2018, Russia placed fifteenth in the second semi-final with the song "I Won't Break" performed by Julia Samoylova, making it the first time Russia did not qualify for the final since the introduction of semi-finals in 2004.

== Before Eurovision ==
=== Internal selection ===
On 7 February 2019, Russian broadcaster RTR announced that Sergey Lazarev would represent Russia in 2019. His song for the contest, "Scream", was released on 9 March 2019. Sergey Lazarev was selected as the Russian entrant by an expert committee from seven shortlisted candidates, among them which also included Aleksandr Panayotov, Egor Kreed, Elena Temnikova, Manizha, (Note: Manizha stated that she would like to perform with "I Am Who I Am" at Eurovision, but it is not known whether she sent this song to RTR) Olga Buzova and Philipp Kirkorov, as reported by Russian media. After several Russian online media outlets published information about the shortlist of entrants for Eurovision 2019, RTR stated that "The list of candidates does not exist and is unlikely to exist" and the entrant will be named at the end of January.

== At Eurovision ==
According to Eurovision rules, all nations with the exceptions of the host country and the "Big Five" (France, Germany, Italy, Spain and the United Kingdom) are required to qualify from one of two semi-finals in order to compete for the final; the top ten countries from each semi-final progress to the final. The European Broadcasting Union (EBU) split up the competing countries into six different pots based on voting patterns from previous contests, with countries with favourable voting histories put into the same pot. On 28 January 2019, a special allocation draw was held which placed each country into one of the two semi-finals, as well as which half of the show they would perform in. Russia was placed into the second semi-final, to be held on 16 May 2019, and was scheduled to perform in the second half of the show.

Once all the competing songs for the 2019 contest had been released, the running order for the semi-finals was decided by the shows' producers rather than through another draw, so that similar songs were not placed next to each other. Russia was set to perform in position 13, following the entry from Lithuania and preceding the entry from Albania.

=== Semi-final ===
Russia performed thirteenth in the second semi-final, following the entry from Lithuania and preceding the entry from Albania. At the end of the show, Russia was announced as having finished in the top 10 and subsequently qualifying for the grand final. It was later revealed that Russia placed sixth in the semi-final, receiving a total of 217 points: 124 points from the televoting and 93 points from the juries.

=== Voting ===
Voting during the three shows involved each country awarding two sets of points from 1–8, 10 and 12: one from their professional jury and the other from televoting. Each nation's jury consisted of five music industry professionals who are citizens of the country they represent, with their names published before the contest to ensure transparency. This jury judged each entry based on: vocal capacity; the stage performance; the song's composition and originality; and the overall impression by the act. In addition, no member of a national jury was permitted to be related in any way to any of the competing acts in such a way that they cannot vote impartially and independently. The individual rankings of each jury member as well as the nation's televoting results will be released shortly after the grand final.

==== Points awarded to Russia ====
Points awarded to Russia (Semi-final 2)
Score	Televote	Jury
12 points	Armenia; Azerbaijan; Latvia	Azerbaijan
10 points	Lithuania; Moldova	North Macedonia
8 points	Romania	Albania; Malta; Moldova
7 points	Germany; Ireland; Italy; North Macedonia	Armenia; Netherlands; Sweden
6 points		Romania
5 points	Malta	
4 points	Austria; Norway	Lithuania
3 points	Croatia; Denmark; Netherlands; Sweden; Switzerland	Croatia; Denmark; Latvia; Norway; United Kingdom
2 points	Albania; United Kingdom	
1 point		Switzerland

Points awarded to Russia (Final)
Score	Televote	Jury
12 points	Albania; Armenia; Azerbaijan; Belarus; Czech Republic; Estonia; Israel; Latvia; Lithuania; Moldova; San Marino	Azerbaijan
10 points	Cyprus; Montenegro; Portugal	Cyprus; Greece; Malta; Montenegro; San Marino
8 points	Georgia; Germany; Greece; Italy; Serbia	
7 points	Hungary; Romania	
6 points		Estonia; North Macedonia; Romania
5 points	Austria; Ireland	Armenia; Moldova; Netherlands
4 points	Finland; Malta	Australia; Latvia; United Kingdom
3 points	France; Poland	Denmark; Ireland; Sweden; Switzerland
2 points	Spain	Croatia; Spain
1 point	Belgium; Norway	Albania; Belarus; Lithuania

==== Points awarded by Russia ====
Points awarded by Russia (Semi-final 2)
Score	Televote	Jury
12 points	Azerbaijan	Romania
10 points	Armenia	North Macedonia
8 points	Norway	Malta
7 points	Netherlands	Albania
6 points	North Macedonia	Armenia
5 points	Moldova	Moldova
4 points	Switzerland	Azerbaijan
3 points	Croatia	Denmark
2 points	Sweden	Switzerland
1 point	Lithuania	Netherlands

Points awarded by Russia (Final)
Score	Televote	Jury
12 points	Azerbaijan	Azerbaijan
10 points	Norway	Greece
8 points	Belarus	Cyprus
7 points	Iceland	Belarus
6 points	Slovenia	Malta
5 points	Netherlands	San Marino
4 points	Australia	North Macedonia
3 points	Serbia	Albania
2 points	Switzerland	Iceland
1 point	Italy	Spain

==== Detailed voting results ====
The following members comprised the Russian jury:

- Lora Kvint (jury chairperson) – composer, pianist
- Simon Osiashvili – poet, singer
- Igor Gulyaev – fashion designer, TV host
- Anastasia Tolmacheva – singer, winner of the Junior Eurovision Song Contest 2006, represented Russia in the 2014 contest
- Maria Tolmacheva – singer, winner of the Junior Eurovision Song Contest 2006, represented Russia in the 2014 contest

Detailed voting results from Russia (Semi-final 2)
R/O	Country	Jury							Televote	
R/O	Country	L. Kvint	S. Osiashvili	I. Gulyaev	A. Tolmacheva	M. Tolmacheva	Rank	Points	Rank	Points
01	Armenia	10	8	4	2	7	5	6	2	10
02	Ireland	15	15	7	12	11	14		16	
03	Moldova	5	6	12	5	5	6	5	6	5
04	Switzerland	9	16	2	17	8	9	2	7	4
05	Latvia	8	12	14	13	10	13		15	
06	Romania	2	3	11	1	3	1	12	13	
07	Denmark	14	10	1	8	16	8	3	11	
08	Sweden	13	9	8	15	15	16		9	2
09	Austria	7	14	13	14	9	12		17	
10	Croatia	12	13	9	11	12	17		8	3
11	Malta	3	2	10	6	1	3	8	12	
12	Lithuania	11	17	3	10	17	11		10	1
13	Russia									
14	Albania	6	5	16	4	2	4	7	14	
15	Norway	17	11	6	16	14	15		3	8
16	Netherlands	16	4	5	9	13	10	1	4	7
17	North Macedonia	1	1	15	3	6	2	10	5	6
18	Azerbaijan	4	7	17	7	4	7	4	1	12

Detailed voting results from Russia (Final)
R/O	Country	Jury							Televote	
R/O	Country	L. Kvint	S. Osiashvili	I. Gulyaev	A. Tolmacheva	M. Tolmacheva	Rank	Points	Rank	Points
01	Malta	8	6	13	1	10	5	6	19	
02	Albania	14	10	2	6	11	8	3	22	
03	Czech Republic	13	22	21	14	23	21		18	
04	Germany	22	17	22	25	24	24		23	
05	Russia									
06	Denmark	17	13	25	18	9	17		14	
07	San Marino	10	8	9	3	6	6	5	13	
08	North Macedonia	6	5	6	12	8	7	4	11	
09	Sweden	16	12	11	22	22	18		17	
10	Slovenia	15	15	17	21	16	20		5	6
11	Cyprus	7	1	4	7	4	3	8	20	
12	Netherlands	18	3	18	17	19	14		6	5
13	Greece	11	2	10	2	2	2	10	24	
14	Israel	25	25	20	24	21	25		21	
15	Norway	20	14	23	19	12	19		2	10
16	United Kingdom	19	16	19	23	17	23		25	
17	Iceland	1	18	8	10	20	9	2	4	7
18	Estonia	23	20	16	16	15	22		15	
19	Belarus	5	7	3	5	5	4	7	3	8
20	Azerbaijan	4	4	1	4	3	1	12	1	12
21	France	2	21	15	20	14	13		12	
22	Italy	24	19	14	15	1	11		10	1
23	Serbia	12	11	7	8	7	12		8	3
24	Switzerland	9	23	24	11	18	16		9	2
25	Australia	21	24	5	13	25	15		7	4
26	Spain	3	9	12	9	13	10	1	16	
