= United Kingdom in the Eurovision Song Contest 2019 =

- Eurovision Song Contest 2019
- Participating broadcaster: British Broadcasting Corporation (BBC)
- Country: United Kingdom
- Selection process: Eurovision: You Decide
- Selection date: 8 February 2019

Competing entry
- Song: "Bigger than Us"
- Artist: Michael Rice
- Songwriters: Laurell Barker; Anna-Klara Folin; John Lundvik; Jonas Thander

Placement
- Final result: 26th, 11 points

Participation chronology

The United Kingdom was represented at the Eurovision Song Contest 2019 with the song "Bigger than Us", written by Laurell Barker, Anna-Klara Folin, John Lundvik, and Jonas Thander, and performed by Michael Rice. The British participating broadcaster, the British Broadcasting Corporation (BBC), selected its entry in the contest via the national final Eurovision: You Decide. Six acts competed in the national final and the winner was selected through two rounds of voting. Songwriter John Lundvik represented Sweden that same year with the song "Too Late for Love".

As a member of the "Big Five", the United Kingdom automatically qualified to compete in the final of the Eurovision Song Contest. Performing in position 16, the United Kingdom placed 26th (last) out of the 26 participating countries with 11 points. This was the fourth time the nation had placed last in the history of the competition.

== Background ==
Prior to the 2019 contest, the British Broadcasting Corporation (BBC) had participated in the Eurovision Song Contest representing the United Kingdom sixty-one times. Thus far, it has won the contest five times: in 1967 with the song "Puppet on a String" performed by Sandie Shaw, in 1969 with the song "Boom Bang-a-Bang" performed by Lulu, in 1976 with the song "Save Your Kisses for Me" performed by Brotherhood of Man, in 1981 with the song "Making Your Mind Up" performed by Bucks Fizz, and in 1997 with the song "Love Shine a Light" performed by Katrina and the Waves. To this point, the nation is noted for having finished as the runner-up in a record fifteen contests. Up to and including 1998, the UK had only twice finished outside the top 10, in 1978 and 1987. Since 1999, the year in which the rule was abandoned that songs must be performed in one of the official languages of the country participating, the UK has had less success, thus far only finishing within the top ten twice: in 2002 with the song "Come Back" performed by Jessica Garlick and in 2009 with the song "It's My Time" performed by Jade Ewen. For the 2018 contest, the United Kingdom finished in twenty-fourth place out of twenty-six competing entries with the song "Storm" performed by SuRie.

As part of its duties as participating broadcaster, the BBC organises the selection of its entry in the Eurovision Song Contest and broadcasts the event in the country. The broadcaster announced that it would participate in the 2019 contest on 19 September 2018. Between 2011 and 2015, BBC opted to internally select the British entry, while the broadcaster organised a national final featuring a competition among several artists and songs since 2016. For their 2019 entry, BBC announced that a national final involving a public vote would be held to select United Kingdom's entry.

== Before Eurovision ==
=== Eurovision: You Decide ===
Eurovision: You Decide was the national final developed by the BBC in order to select the British entry for the Eurovision Song Contest 2019. Six acts competed in a televised show on 8 February 2019 held at Dock10 venue at the MediaCityUK in Salford and hosted by Mel Giedroyc and previous Eurovision Song Contest winner Måns Zelmerlöw who won the contest for Sweden in 2015 with the song "Heroes". The winner was selected through a professional jury and a public televote. The show was broadcast on BBC Two as well as streamed online via the BBC iPlayer. The national final was watched by 1.17 million viewers in the United Kingdom with a market share of 6.4%.

==== Competing entries ====
On 19 September 2018, BBC announced an open submission for interested songwriters to submit their songs until 26 October 2018. The received submissions from the open call were reviewed and a shortlist was compiled by the UK branch of the international OGAE fan club. Additional entries were provided to the BBC by songwriter, publisher and co-founder of DWB Music, Greig Watts, who held songwriting camps with professional songwriters. Songs from both entry methods were included in a final ten-song shortlist which was presented to an international professional panel that ultimately selected three songs to compete in the national final. The three competing songs were then matched with two artists each, which were announced via social media and the BBC Eurovision website on 23 January 2019.

Song	Songwriter(s)
"Bigger than Us"	Laurell Barker; Anna-Klara Folin; John Lundvik; Jonas Thander
"Freaks"	Jon Maguire; Rick Parkhouse; Corey Sanders; George Tizzard
"Sweet Lies"	Maria Broberg; Lise Cabble; Esben Svane

==== Final ====
Six acts competed in the televised final on 8 February 2019. In addition to their performances, guest performers included previous Eurovision Song Contest winners Bucks Fizz, who won the contest for the United Kingdom in 1981 with the song "Making Your Mind Up", and Katrina Leskanich, who won the contest for the United Kingdom in 1997 as the lead vocalist of the band Katrina and the Waves with the song "Love Shine a Light", performing a medley of past British Eurovision songs with Måns Zelmerlöw. Guest performers also included previous Eurovision Song Contest winner Netta, who won the contest for Israel in 2018 performing the song "Toy", and SuRie, who represented the United Kingdom in 2018 performing a piano rendition of the song "Storm".

The winner was selected over two rounds of voting. In the first round, each of the three songs were performed by two artists in different versions and a three-member professional jury selected one artist per song to proceed to the second round. The jury consisted of Rylan Clark-Neal (television presenter and Eurovision fan), Marvin Humes (DJ, producer and radio presenter) and Mollie King (singer-songwriter and radio presenter). In the second round, a public vote consisting of televoting and online voting selected the winner, "Bigger than Us" performed by Michael Rice.

Duels Round – 8 February 2019
Duel	R/O	Artist	Song	Jury Votes			Total	Result
Duel	R/O	Artist	Song	R. Clark-Neal	M. Humes	M. King	Total	Result
I	1	Kerrie-Anne	"Sweet Lies"	X	X	X	3	Advanced
I	2	Anisa	"Sweet Lies"				0	—N/a
II	3	Jordan Clarke	"Freaks"	X	X		2	Advanced
II	4	Maid	"Freaks"			X	1	—N/a
III	5	Holly Tandy	"Bigger than Us"				0	—N/a
III	6	Michael Rice	"Bigger than Us"	X	X	X	3	Advanced

Final Round – 8 February 2019
R/O	Artist	Song	Place
1	Kerrie-Anne	"Sweet Lies"	—N/a
2	Jordan Clarke	"Freaks"	—N/a
3	Michael Rice	"Bigger than Us"	1

=== Promotion ===
Michael Rice made several appearances across Europe to specifically promote "Bigger than Us" as the British Eurovision entry. On 31 March, Michael Rice took part in promotional activities in Croatia where he performed "Bigger than Us" during Zvijezde pjevaju, the Croatian version of Just the Two of Us. On 14 April, Rice performed during the Eurovision in Concert event which was held at the AFAS Live venue in Amsterdam, Netherlands and hosted by Edsilia Rombley and Marlayne. On 21 April, Rice performed during the Eurovision Pre-Party Madrid event, which was held at the Sala La Riviera venue in Madrid, Spain and hosted by Tony Aguilar and Julia Varela. On 24 April, Rice performing during the Eurovision Pre-Party, which was held at the Vegas City Hall in Moscow, Russia and hosted by Alexey Lebedev and Andres Safari.

In addition to his international appearances, on 14 April, Michael Rice performed during the London Eurovision Party, which was held at the Café de Paris venue in London and hosted by Nicki French and Paddy O'Connell. On 3 May, Rice was part of the guest line-up for the BBC One programme The Graham Norton Show where he performed "Bigger than Us" live and were interviewed by host Graham Norton.

== At Eurovision ==
According to Eurovision rules, all nations with the exceptions of the host country and the "Big Five" (France, Germany, Italy, Spain and the United Kingdom) are required to compete in one of two semi-finals, and qualify in order to participate in the final; the top ten countries from each semi-final progress to the final. As a member of the "Big Five", the United Kingdom automatically qualified to compete in the final on 18 May 2019. In addition to their participation in the final, the United Kingdom is also required to broadcast and vote in one of the two semi-finals. During the semi-final allocation draw on 28 January 2019, the United Kingdom was assigned to broadcast and vote in the second semi-final on 16 May 2019.

In the United Kingdom, the semi-finals were broadcast on BBC Four with commentary by Scott Mills and Rylan Clark-Neal, while the final was televised on BBC One with commentary by Graham Norton and broadcast on BBC Radio 2 with commentary by Ken Bruce. The British spokesperson, who announced the top 12-point score awarded by the British jury during the final, was Rylan Clark-Neal.

=== Final ===
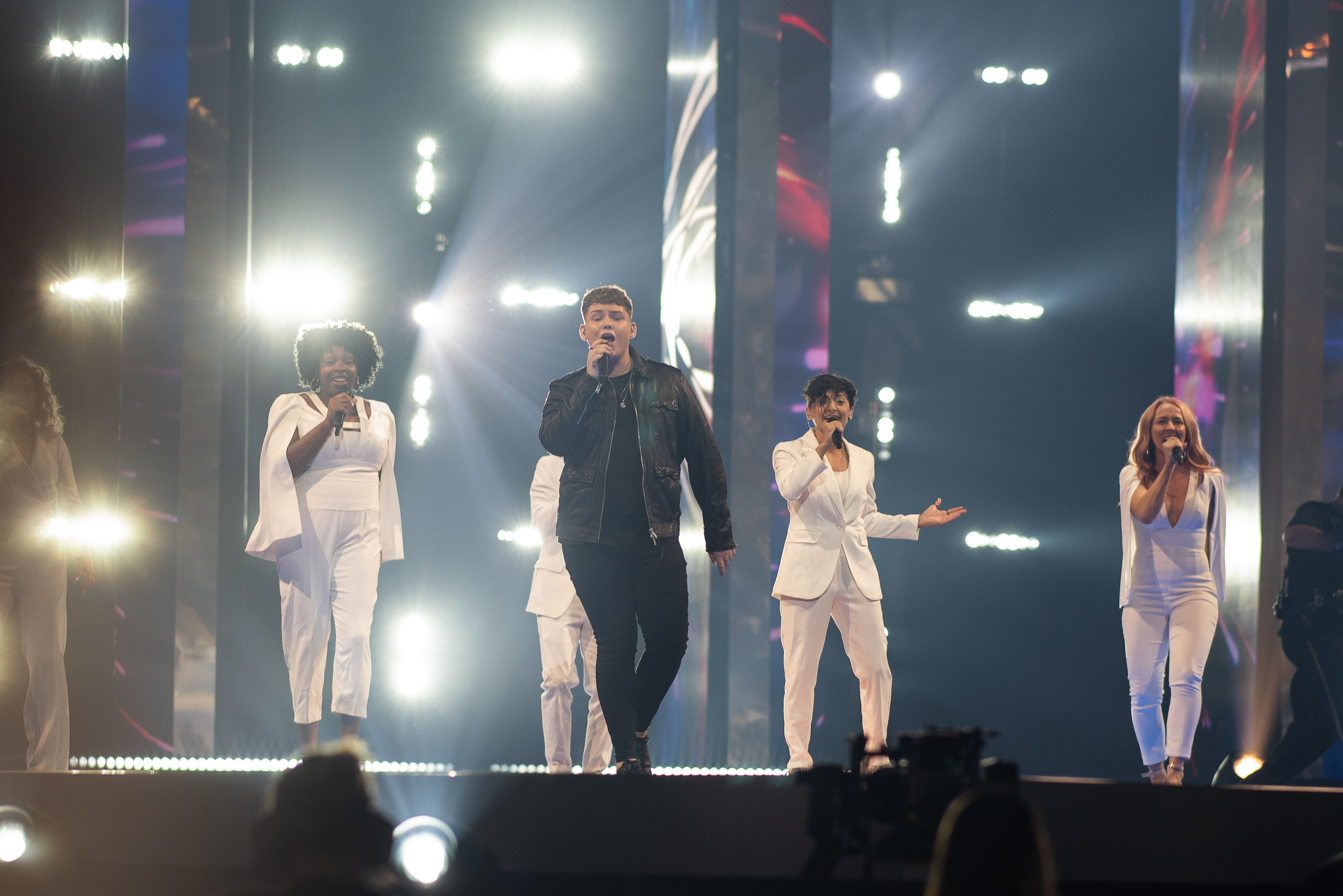
Michael Rice during a rehearsal before the final

Michael Rice took part in technical rehearsals on 10 and 12 May, followed by dress rehearsals on 15, 17 and 18 May. This included the semi-final jury show on 15 May where an extended clip of the British performance was filmed for broadcast during the live show on 16 May and the jury final on 17 May where the professional juries of each country watched and voted on the competing entries. After technical rehearsals were held on 12 May, the "Big Five" countries and host country Israel held a press conference. As part of this press conference, the artists took part in a draw to determine which half of the grand final they would subsequently participate in. The United Kingdom was drawn to compete in the second half. Following the conclusion of the second semi-final, the shows' producers decided upon the running order of the final. The running order for the semi-finals and final was decided by the shows' producers rather than through another draw, so that similar songs were not placed next to each other. The United Kingdom was subsequently placed to perform in position 16, following the entry from Norway and before the entry from Iceland.

The British performance began with Michael Rice performing alone on stage under a spotlight. As the song progressed, Rice was joined by five backing vocalists with the LED screens displaying a galaxy of shooting stars. The performers concluded the performance by gathering together in a circle, which symbolised hope and love between the performers. The backing vocalists that joined Michael Rice for the performance were Anna Sahlene, Chin Simon, Desta Zion Wilson, Linda Pritchard and Melanie Wehbe. Sahlene previously represented Estonia in the Eurovision Song Contest 2002 where she placed third with the song "Runaway". The United Kingdom placed twenty-sixth (last) in the final, scoring 11 points: 3 points from the televoting and 8 points from the juries.

=== Voting ===
Voting during the three shows involved each country awarding two sets of points from 1-8, 10 and 12: one from their professional jury and the other from televoting. Each nation's jury consisted of five music industry professionals who are citizens of the country they represent, with their names published before the contest to ensure transparency. This jury judged each entry based on: vocal capacity; the stage performance; the song's composition and originality; and the overall impression by the act. In addition, no member of a national jury was permitted to be related in any way to any of the competing acts in such a way that they cannot vote impartially and independently. The individual rankings of each jury member as well as the nation's televoting results were released shortly after the grand final.

Below is a breakdown of points awarded to the United Kingdom and awarded by United Kingdom in the second semi-final and grand final of the contest, and the breakdown of the jury voting and televoting conducted during the two shows:

==== Points awarded to the United Kingdom ====
Points awarded to the United Kingdom (Final)
Score	Televote	Jury
12 points		
10 points		
8 points		
7 points		
6 points		
5 points		
4 points		
3 points	Ireland	
2 points		Armenia; Hungary; Norway
1 point		Georgia; Switzerland

==== Points awarded by the United Kingdom ====
Points awarded by the United Kingdom (Semi-final 2)
Score	Televote	Jury
12 points	Lithuania	North Macedonia
10 points	Norway	Sweden
8 points	Malta	Croatia
7 points	Azerbaijan	Azerbaijan
6 points	Switzerland	Denmark
5 points	Netherlands	Romania
4 points	Sweden	Moldova
3 points	Ireland	Russia
2 points	Russia	Netherlands
1 point	Romania	Malta

Points awarded by the United Kingdom (Final)
Score	Televote	Jury
12 points	Norway	North Macedonia
10 points	Australia	Sweden
8 points	Iceland	Australia
7 points	Switzerland	Azerbaijan
6 points	Denmark	Netherlands
5 points	Sweden	Switzerland
4 points	Netherlands	Russia
3 points	Azerbaijan	Denmark
2 points	Spain	France
1 point	Cyprus	Czech Republic

==== Detailed voting results ====
The following members comprised the British jury:

- Pete Watson (jury chairperson) – musical director
- Jai Ramage – vocal coach
- Adele Roberts – BBC Radio 1 DJ
- AJ Bentley – singer, actor
- George Ure – actor

Detailed voting results from the United Kingdom (Semi-final 2)
R/O	Country	Jury							Televote	
R/O	Country	P. Watson	J. Ramage	A. Roberts	AJ Bentley	G. Ure	Rank	Points	Rank	Points
01	Armenia	14	17	15	11	17	17		17	
02	Ireland	17	10	11	17	13	15		8	3
03	Moldova	6	14	5	9	3	7	4	16	
04	Switzerland	10	12	14	7	14	12		5	6
05	Latvia	15	18	8	18	15	16		14	
06	Romania	7	6	4	10	5	6	5	10	1
07	Denmark	16	3	10	1	18	5	6	13	
08	Sweden	3	2	1	4	2	2	10	7	4
09	Austria	18	16	18	16	16	18		18	
10	Croatia	5	8	3	2	8	3	8	15	
11	Malta	4	11	6	8	12	10	1	3	8
12	Lithuania	13	7	17	15	10	14		1	12
13	Russia	8	4	13	6	7	8	3	9	2
14	Albania	11	15	16	14	6	13		11	
15	Norway	12	13	7	13	11	11		2	10
16	Netherlands	9	5	12	12	4	9	2	6	5
17	North Macedonia	1	1	2	5	1	1	12	12	
18	Azerbaijan	2	9	9	3	9	4	7	4	7

Detailed voting results from the United Kingdom (Final)
R/O	Country	Jury							Televote	
R/O	Country	P. Watson	J. Ramage	A. Roberts	AJ Bentley	G. Ure	Rank	Points	Rank	Points
01	Malta	10	15	14	14	13	14		15	
02	Albania	16	9	12	20	8	13		20	
03	Czech Republic	23	12	10	3	12	10	1	16	
04	Germany	21	16	19	19	18	23		24	
05	Russia	8	5	15	6	6	7	4	13	
06	Denmark	17	6	5	4	21	8	3	5	6
07	San Marino	20	25	22	25	24	25		21	
08	North Macedonia	2	1	2	2	2	1	12	18	
09	Sweden	1	2	3	8	1	2	10	6	5
10	Slovenia	24	23	9	24	25	20		23	
11	Cyprus	11	17	23	17	19	19		10	1
12	Netherlands	5	7	13	11	3	5	6	7	4
13	Greece	19	22	25	22	22	24		19	
14	Israel	18	19	17	18	17	21		17	
15	Norway	15	10	4	12	11	11		1	12
16	United Kingdom									
17	Iceland	14	21	24	23	16	22		3	8
18	Estonia	9	11	21	16	7	12		12	
19	Belarus	12	20	18	13	15	18		22	
20	Azerbaijan	3	8	8	5	4	4	7	8	3
21	France	7	3	20	10	9	9	2	14	
22	Italy	25	18	11	9	20	15		11	
23	Serbia	13	13	16	15	14	16		25	
24	Switzerland	6	14	6	7	5	6	5	4	7
25	Australia	4	4	1	1	10	3	8	2	10
26	Spain	22	24	7	21	23	17		9	2
