= Serbia in the Eurovision Song Contest 2019 =

- Eurovision Song Contest 2019
- Participating broadcaster: Radio Television of Serbia (RTS)
- Country: Serbia
- Selection process: Beovizija 2019
- Selection date: 3 March 2019

Competing entry
- Song: "Kruna"
- Artist: Nevena Božović
- Songwriters: Nevena Božović

Placement
- Semi-final result: Qualified (7th, 156 points)
- Final result: 18th, 89 points

Participation chronology

Serbia was represented at the Eurovision Song Contest 2019 with the song "Kruna", written and performed by Nevena Božović, who had previously represented Serbia in the Junior Eurovision Song Contest in 2007 and in the Eurovision Song Contest in 2013 as part of the group Moje 3. The Serbian national broadcaster, Radio Television of Serbia (RTS), organised the national final Beovizija 2019 in order to select the Serbian entry for the 2019 contest in Tel Aviv, Israel. The national final consisted of three shows: two semi-finals on 27 and 28 February 2019 and a final on 3 March 2019. Twelve entries competed in each semi-final where the top six qualified to the final from each semi-final following the combination of votes from a five-member jury panel and a public televote. The twelve qualifiers competed in the final which resulted in "Kruna" performed by Nevena Božović as the winner following the combination of votes from a five-member jury panel and a public televote.

Serbia was drawn to compete in the first semi-final of the Eurovision Song Contest which took place on 14 May 2019. Performing during the show in position 9, "Kruna" was announced among the top 10 entries of the first semi-final and therefore qualified to compete in the final on 18 May. It was later revealed that Serbia placed seventh out of the 17 participating countries in the semi-final with 156 points. In the final, Serbia performed in position 23 and placed eighteenth out of the 26 participating countries, scoring 89 points.

== Background ==
Prior to the 2019 contest, Serbia had participated in the Eurovision Song Contest eleven times since its first entry in 2007, winning the contest with their debut entry "Molitva" performed by Marija Šerifović. Since 2007, eight out of eleven of Serbia's entries have featured in the final with the nation failing to qualify in 2009, 2013 and 2017. Serbia's 2018 entry "Nova deca" performed by Sanja Ilić and Balkanika qualified to the final and placed nineteenth.

The Serbian national broadcaster, Radio Television of Serbia (RTS), broadcasts the event within Serbia and organises the selection process for the nation's entry. RTS confirmed their intentions to participate at the 2019 Eurovision Song Contest on 6 August 2018. Between 2007 and 2009, Serbia used the Beovizija national final in order to select their entry. However, after their 2009 entry, "Cipela" performed by Marko Kon and Milaan, failed to qualify Serbia to the final, the broadcaster shifted their selection strategy to selecting specific composers to create songs for artists. In 2010, RTS selected Goran Bregović to compose songs for a national final featuring three artists, while in 2011 Kornelije Kovač, Aleksandra Kovač and Kristina Kovač were tasked with composing one song each. In 2012, the internal selection of Željko Joksimović and the song "Nije ljubav stvar" secured the country's second highest placing in the contest to this point, placing third. In 2013, RTS returned to an open national final format and organized the Beosong competition. The winning entry, "Ljubav je svuda" performed by Moje 3, failed to qualify Serbia to the final at the Eurovision Song Contest 2013. In 2015, RTS selected Vladimir Graić, the composer of Serbia's 2007 Eurovision Song Contest winning entry "Molitva", to compose songs for a national final featuring three artists. RTS internally selected the Serbian entries in 2016 and 2017 with the decision made by RTS music editors. In 2018, RTS returned to using the Beovizija national final in order to select their entry.

== Before Eurovision ==
=== Beovizija 2019 ===
Beovizija 2019 was the ninth edition of the Beovizija national final organised by RTS in order to select the Serbian entry for the Eurovision Song Contest 2019. The selection consisted of two semi-finals featuring twelve songs each to be held on 27 and 28 February 2019, respectively, and a final featuring twelve songs to be held on 3 March 2019. The three shows were broadcast on RTS1, RTS HD, RTS Svet and RTS Planeta as well as streamed online via the broadcaster's website rts.rs.

==== Competing entries ====
Artists and songwriters were able to submit their entries between 8 August 2018 and 15 November 2018. Artists were required to be Serb citizens and submit entries in one of the official languages of the Republic of Serbia, while songwriters of any nationality were allowed to submit songs. At the closing of the deadline, 76 submissions were received. A selection committee consisting of RTS music editors reviewed the submissions and selected twenty-four entries to proceed to the national final. The selected competing entries were announced on 10 January 2019 and among the competing artists were Extra Nena, who represented Yugoslavia in the Eurovision Song Contest 1992, and Nevena Božović who represented Serbia in the Junior Eurovision Song Contest 2007 and 2013, the latter as part of the group Moje 3.

Artist	Song	Songwriter(s)
Aleksandra Sekulić	"Tugo" (Туго)	Ana Sekulić, Filip Kuranji
Ana Popović	"Lutaš" (Луташ)	Sofija Milutinović
Dunja Vujadinović	"7"	Boris Krstajić, Ljiljana Jorgovanović
Dženan Lončarević	"Nema suza" (Нема суза)	Željko Vasić, Dragan Čolaković
Eleonora	"Samo lagano" (Само лагано)	Eleonora Lav Jovanović, Husein Alijević
Extra Nena	"Još ti čujem glas" (Још ти чујем глас)	Ivan Akulov, Milena Ludajić, Snežana Berić
Funked Up	"Zašto da se ne desi" (Зашто да се не деси)	Vojin Vilotijević
Gipsykord	"Boje" (Боје)	Jovan Savić, Zvonko Marković, Mišo Krpo, Sanja Krstić, Milena Ludajić
Goga Stanić	"Čudo" (Чудо)	Ylva Persson, Linda Persson, Dimitri Stassos, Vladimir Marković Luni, Marko Kon, Ognjen Amidžić
Ivan Kurtić	"Bella"	Goran Ratković Rale, Radenko Mitrović
Ivana Vladović and Wonder Strings	"Moja bol" (Моја бол)	Aleksandra Milutinović
Jana	"Viktorija" (Викторија)	Vladimir Graić, Željko Hubač
Lana i Aldo	"Pogledaj u nebo" (Погледај у небо)	Lana Toković
Lord	"Radnički sin" (Раднички син)	Vladimir Preradović Lord
Majdan	"Budim te" (Будим те)	Nemanja Erić, Marija Vagner
Mr Doo	"Do 100" (До 100)	Sanja Ilić, Mr Doo, Leontina Vukomanović
Nataša and Una	"Samo bez straha" (Само без страха)	Predrag Vukčević, Marko Stojanović Luis, Nataša Guberinić, Una Senić, Petar Zorkić, Nemanja Kostić
Nevena Božović	"Kruna" (Круна)	Nevena Božović
Osvajači	"Voda i plamen" (Вода и пламен)	Nebojša Jakovljević, Zvonko Pantović
Sanya D Rio	"Ljubimo se" (Љубимо се)	Miki Dumonjić
Sashka Janx	"Da li čuješ moj glas" (Да ли чујеш мој глас)	Saška Janković, Marko Nikolić
Sofija Perić	"Aritmija" (Аритмија)	Vladimir Graić, Snežana Vukomanović
Tamara Milanović	"Reči nisu dovoljne" (Речи нису довољне)	Marcel Sprunkel, Gavrilo Milovanović
Tina and Lola Amvon	"Tvoje oči" (Твоје очи)	Tina Amvon, Olgica Lola Amvon

==== Semi-finals ====
Two semi-finals took place at the Studio 8 of RTS in Košutnjak, Belgrade on 27 and 28 February 2019. Semi-final 1 was hosted by Dragana Kosjerina and Ivan Mihailović and semi-final 2 was hosted by Nebojša Milovanović and Ana Babić. In each semi-final twelve songs competed and six qualifiers for the final were decided by a combination of votes from a jury panel consisting of Zoran Lesendrić (musician), Dragomir Stanojević (musician), Nenad Pribak (president of OGAE Serbia), Aleksandar Aleksov (composer and producer) and Ivana Peters (singer-songwriter), and the Serbian public via SMS voting.

In addition to the competing entries, other performers and former Eurovision contestants featured during the shows. Knez, who represented Montenegro in 2015, Bojana Stamenov, who represented Serbia in 2015, Sanja Vučić, who represented Serbia in 2016, and Jacques Houdek, who represented Croatia in 2017, featured as guest performers in semi-final 1; and Emilija Kokić, who won the contest for Yugoslavia in 1989 as member of the band Riva, Laka and Mirela, who represented Bosnia and Herzegovina in 2008, Jelena Tomašević, who represented Serbia in 2008, Kaliopi, who represented Macedonia in 2012 and 2016, Lea Sirk, who represented Slovenia in 2018, and Sanja Ilić and Balkanika, which represented Serbia in 2018, featured as guest performers in semi-final 2.

First semi-final of Beovizija 2019 – 27 February 2019
R/O	Artist	Song	Jury		Televote		Total	Place
R/O	Artist	Song	Votes	Points	Votes	Points	Total	Place
1	Funked Up	"Zašto da se ne desi"	15	1	1,635	7	8	7
2	Aleksandra Sekulić	"Tugo"	48	10	874	3	13	5
3	Osvajači	"Voda i plamen"	15	2	820	2	4	9
4	Dunja Vujadinović	"7"	20	4	534	0	4	10
5	Mr. Doo	"Do 100"	5	0	733	1	1	11
6	Sashka Janx	"Da li čuješ moj glas"	44	8	1,557	6	14	3
7	Ivan Kurtić	"Bella"	28	7	971	5	12	6
8	Sofija Perić	"Aritmija"	21	5	1,912	8	13	4
9	Extra Nena	"Još ti čujem glas"	16	3	948	4	7	8
10	Eleonora	"Samo lagano"	0	0	346	0	0	12
11	Wonder Strings and Ivana Vladović	"Moja bol"	54	12	1,954	10	22	1
12	Nataša and Una	"Samo bez straha"	24	6	3,189	12	18	2

Detailed Jury Votes – Semi-final 1
R/O	Song	Z. Lesendrić	D. Stanojević	N. Pribak	A. Aleksov	I. Peters	Total
1	"Zašto da se ne desi"	3	6		2	4	15
2	"Tugo"	12	8	8	12	8	48
3	"Voda i plamen"	2	4	1	7	1	15
4	"7"	4	1	6	3	6	20
5	"Do 100"			5			5
6	"Da li čuješ moj glas"	7	10	12	5	10	44
7	"Bella"	8	5	4	6	5	28
8	"Aritmija"	5	2	7	4	3	21
9	"Još ti čujem glas"	1	3	2	8	2	16
10	"Samo lagano"						0
11	"Moja bol"	10	12	10	10	12	54
12	"Samo bez straha"	6	7	3	1	7	24

Second semi-final of Beovizija 2019 – 28 February 2019
R/O	Artist	Song	Jury		Televote		Total	Place
R/O	Artist	Song	Votes	Points	Votes	Points	Total	Place
1	Sanya D Rio	"Ljubimo se"	10	2	635	1	3	10
2	Majdan	"Budim te"	32	7	1,413	8	15	4
3	Goga Stanić	"Čudo"	15	4	687	2	6	8
4	Ana Popović	"Lutaš"	25	5	1,103	7	13	5
5	Lord	"Radnički sin"	53	10	1,082	6	16	3
6	Nevena Božović	"Kruna"	54	12	1,542	10	22	1
7	Gipsykord	"Boje"	1	0	878	4	4	9
8	Jana	"Viktorija"	39	8	698	3	11	6
9	Lana i Aldo	"Pogledaj u nebo"	13	3	510	0	3	11
10	Dženan Lončarević	"Nema suza"	29	6	3,516	12	18	2
11	Tina and Lola Amvon	"Tvoje oči"	9	0	526	0	0	12
12	Tamara Milanović	"Reči nisu dovoljne"	10	1	1,014	5	6	7

Detailed Jury Votes – Semi-final 2
R/O	Song	Z. Lesendrić	D. Stanojević	N. Pribak	A. Aleksov	I. Peters	Total
1	"Ljubimo se"		3	2	5		10
2	"Budim te"	8	7	3	7	7	32
3	"Čudo"	1	4	6	1	3	15
4	"Lutaš"	5	6	5	4	5	25
5	"Radnički sin"	12	12	7	12	10	53
6	"Kruna"	10	10	12	10	12	54
7	"Boje"					1	1
8	"Viktorija"	7	8	10	6	8	39
9	"Pogledaj u nebo"	3	2	1	3	4	13
10	"Nema suza"	6	1	8	8	6	29
11	"Tvoje oči"	2	5		2		9
12	"Reči nisu dovoljne"	4		4		2	10

==== Final ====
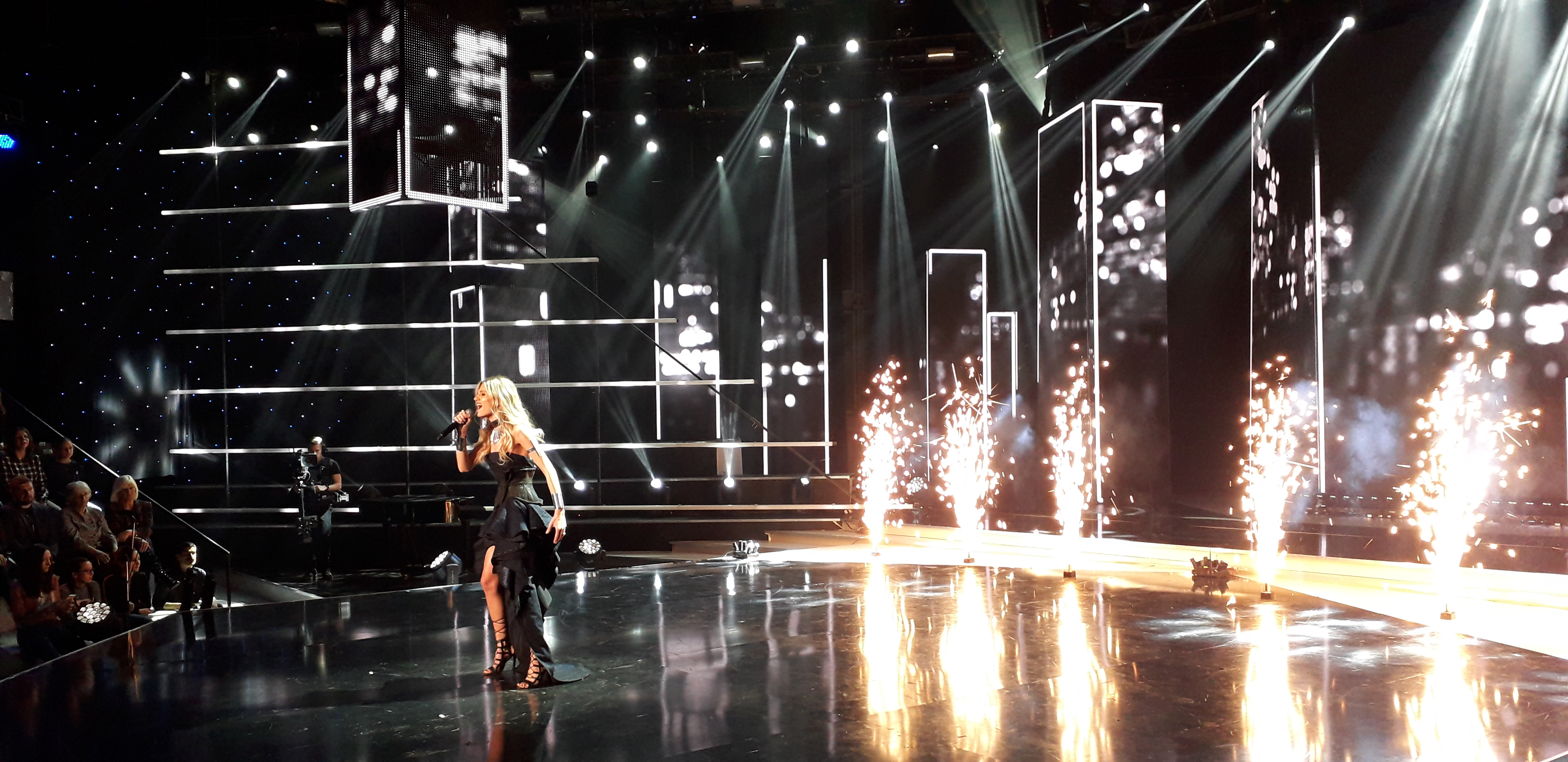
Nevena Božović performing during the Beovizija 2019 final.

The final, hosted by Dragana Kosjerina, Ivan Mihailović, Nebojša Milovanović and Ana Babić, took place at the Studio 8 of RTS in Košutnjak, Belgrade on 3 March 2019 and featured the twelve qualifiers from the preceding two semi-finals. The winner, "Kruna" performed by Nevena Božović, was decided by a combination of votes from a jury panel consisting of Miša Aleksić (musician), Bojana Stamenov (represented Serbia in the Eurovision Song Contest 2015), Dejan Ivanović (lyricist), Goca Tržan (singer) and Aleksandar Milić Mili (composer and producer), and the Serbian public via SMS voting. Former Eurovision contestant Željko Joksimović, who represented Serbia and Montenegro in 2004 and Serbia in 2012 and was one of the hosts of Eurovision 2008, was featured as a guest performer during the show.

Final of Beovizija 2019 – 3 March 2019
R/O	Artist	Song	Jury		Televote		Total	Place
R/O	Artist	Song	Votes	Points	Votes	Points	Total	Place
1	Sashka Janx	"Da li čuješ moj glas"	42	10	4,964	6	16	3
2	Majdan	"Budim te"	19	5	2,514	3	8	7
3	Sofija Perić	"Aritmija"	11	1	2,862	4	5	9
4	Dženan Lončarević	"Nema suza"	36	7	5,858	10	17	2
5	Wonder Strings and Ivana Vladović	"Moja bol"	40	8	4,088	5	13	5
6	Jana	"Viktorija"	15	3	1,487	0	3	10
7	Lord	"Radnički sin"	29	6	2,435	2	8	8
8	Nevena Božović	"Kruna"	56	12	5,708	8	20	1
9	Ana Popović	"Lutaš"	5	0	1,757	0	0	12
10	Ivan Kurtić	"Bella"	19	4	5,010	7	11	6
11	Nataša and Una	"Samo bez straha"	13	2	10,427	12	14	4
12	Aleksandra Sekulić	"Tugo"	5	0	1,872	1	1	11

Detailed Jury Votes – Final
R/O	Song	M. Aleksić	B. Stamenov	D. Ivanović	G. Tržan	A. Milić Mili	Total
1	"Da li čuješ moj glas"	8	12	8	10	4	42
2	"Budim te"	6	2	7	2	2	19
3	"Aritmija"				1	10	11
4	"Nema suza"	10	6	5	7	8	36
5	"Moja bol"	5	8	12	8	7	40
6	"Viktorija"		5	6	3	1	15
7	"Radnički sin"	7	7	4	5	6	29
8	"Kruna"	12	10	10	12	12	56
9	"Lutaš"	2	3				5
10	"Bella"	4	1	3	6	5	19
11	"Samo bez straha"	3	4	2	4		13
12	"Tugo"	1		1		3	5

== At Eurovision ==
According to Eurovision rules, all nations with the exceptions of the host country and the "Big Five" (France, Germany, Italy, Spain and the United Kingdom) are required to qualify from one of two semi-finals in order to compete for the final; the top ten countries from each semi-final progress to the final. The European Broadcasting Union (EBU) split up the competing countries into six different pots based on voting patterns from previous contests, with countries with favourable voting histories put into the same pot. On 28 January 2019, a special allocation draw was held which placed each country into one of the two semi-finals, as well as which half of the show they would perform in. Serbia was placed into the first semi-final, to be held on 14 May 2019, and was scheduled to perform in the first half of the show.

Once all the competing songs for the 2019 contest had been released, the running order for the semi-finals was decided by the shows' producers rather than through another draw, so that similar songs were not placed next to each other. Serbia was set to perform in position 9, following the entry from Belarus and before the entry from Belgium.

The two semi-finals and the final were broadcast in Serbia on RTS1, RTS HD and RTS Svet with commentary for the first semi-final and final by Duška Vučinić and commentary for the second semi-final by Tamara Petković and Katarina Epštajn. The final was also broadcast via radio on Radio Belgrade 1 with commentary by Nikoleta Dojčinović and Katarina Epštajn. The Serbian spokesperson, who announced the top 12-point score awarded by the Serbian jury during the final, was Dragana Kosjerina.

=== Semi-final ===
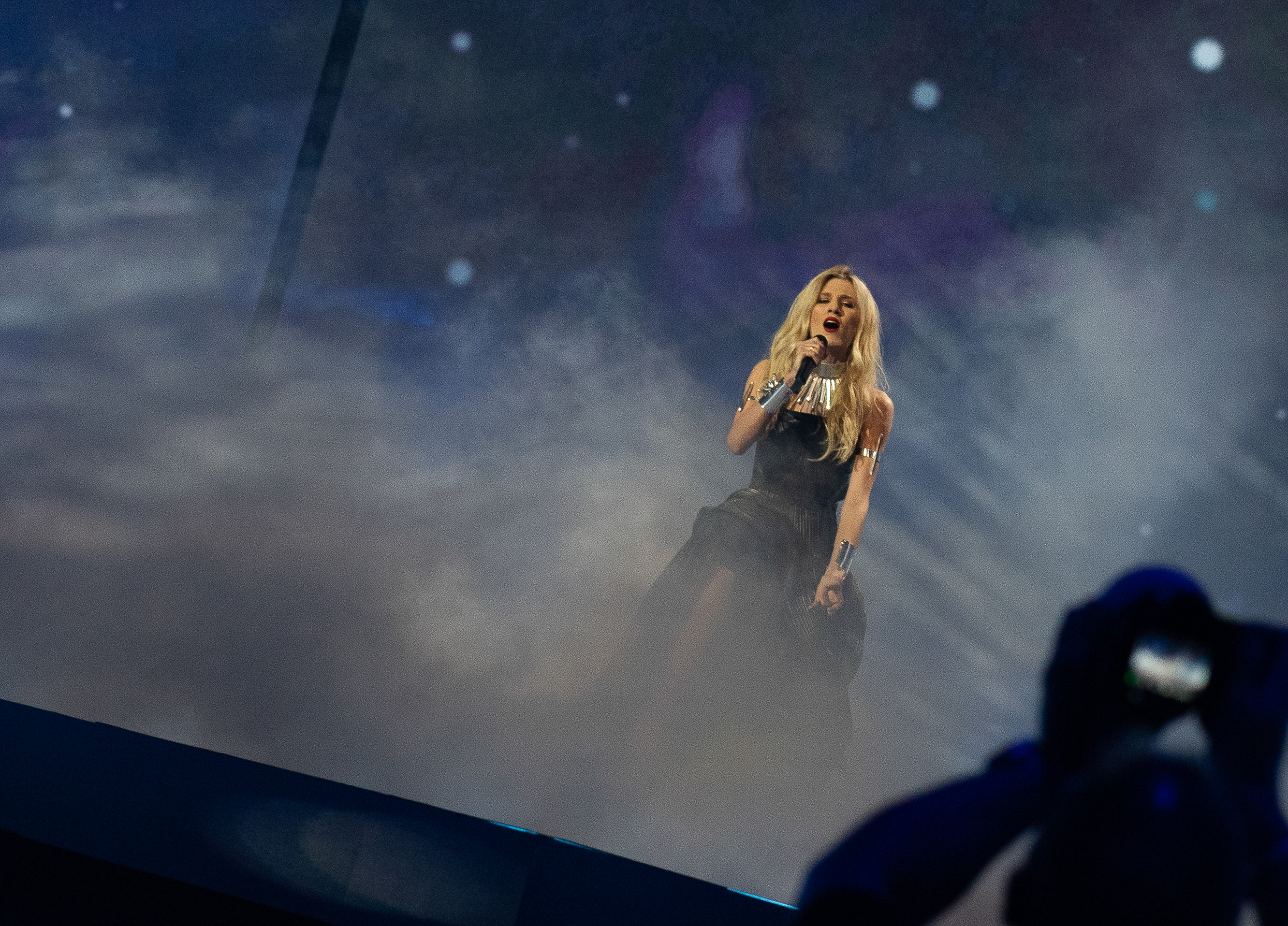
Nevena Božović during a rehearsal before the first semi-final

Nevena Božović took part in technical rehearsals on 4 and 9 May, followed by dress rehearsals on 13 and 14 May. This included the jury show on 13 May where the professional juries of each country watched and voted on the competing entries.

The Serbian performance featured Nevena Božović performing in a black dress and silver accessories which included a necklace, wristband and upper armband. The stage lighting and background LED screens predominately displayed silver colours in the shape of a broken glass which transitioned to yellow and orange colours in the shape of a floating galaxy as the broken glass shatter throughout the song. The performance also featured smoke effects. Nevena Božović was joined by four off-stage backing vocalists: Ivana Vladović, Olga Popović, Dušan Alagić and Mladen Lukić. Lukić had previously represented Serbia in the Eurovision Song Contest 2018 as part of the group Balkanika.

At the end of the show, Serbia was announced as having finished in the top 10 and subsequently qualifying for the grand final. It was later revealed that Serbia placed seventh in the semi-final, receiving a total of 156 points: 65 points from the televoting and 91 points from the juries.

=== Final ===
Shortly after the first semi-final, a winners' press conference was held for the ten qualifying countries. As part of this press conference, the qualifying artists took part in a draw to determine which half of the grand final they would subsequently participate in. This draw was done in the order the countries were announced during the semi-final. Serbia was drawn to compete in the second half. Following this draw, the shows' producers decided upon the running order of the final, as they had done for the semi-finals. Serbia was subsequently placed to perform in position 23, following the entry from Italy and before the entry from Switzerland.

Nevena Božović once again took part in dress rehearsals on 17 and 18 May before the final, including the jury final where the professional juries cast their final votes before the live show. Nevena Božović performed a repeat of her semi-final performance during the final on 18 May. Serbia placed eighteenth in the final, scoring 89 points: 54 points from the televoting and 35 points from the juries.

=== Voting ===
Voting during the three shows involved each country awarding two sets of points from 1-8, 10 and 12: one from their professional jury and the other from televoting. Each nation's jury consisted of five music industry professionals who are citizens of the country they represent, with their names published before the contest to ensure transparency. This jury judged each entry based on: vocal capacity; the stage performance; the song's composition and originality; and the overall impression by the act. In addition, no member of a national jury was permitted to be related in any way to any of the competing acts in such a way that they cannot vote impartially and independently. The individual rankings of each jury member as well as the nation's televoting results were released shortly after the grand final.

Below is a breakdown of points awarded to Serbia and awarded by Serbia in the first semi-final and grand final of the contest, and the breakdown of the jury voting and televoting conducted during the two shows:

==== Points awarded to Serbia ====
Points awarded to Serbia (Semi-final 1)
Score	Televote	Jury
12 points	Montenegro; Slovenia	
10 points		Poland
8 points		
7 points		Hungary; Montenegro
6 points	France; Greece	Cyprus; Czech Republic; Estonia; Georgia; Greece; Iceland
5 points	Cyprus	Belgium; San Marino; Slovenia
4 points	Belarus; Czech Republic; Poland	Portugal
3 points	Georgia; Portugal	Australia; Finland; France; Spain
2 points	Hungary; San Marino	
1 point	Finland; Israel	

Points awarded to Serbia (Final)
Score	Televote	Jury
12 points	Montenegro	Montenegro
10 points	North Macedonia; Slovenia	
8 points	Croatia	
7 points	Switzerland	Poland
6 points		
5 points		
4 points	Austria	Croatia; Estonia
3 points	Russia	Romania
2 points		Austria; Iceland
1 point		Australia

==== Points awarded by Serbia ====
Points awarded by Serbia (Semi-final 1)
Score	Televote	Jury
12 points	Hungary	Montenegro
10 points	Slovenia	Czech Republic
8 points	Montenegro	Cyprus
7 points	Australia	Slovenia
6 points	Iceland	Hungary
5 points	San Marino	Australia
4 points	Belarus	Belarus
3 points	Estonia	Poland
2 points	Greece	Greece
1 point	Czech Republic	Estonia

Points awarded by Serbia (Final)
Score	Televote	Jury
12 points	North Macedonia	North Macedonia
10 points	Slovenia	Italy
8 points	Russia	Sweden
7 points	Italy	Australia
6 points	Switzerland	Estonia
5 points	Iceland	Switzerland
4 points	Norway	Czech Republic
3 points	Netherlands	Azerbaijan
2 points	Spain	Denmark
1 point	San Marino	France

==== Detailed voting results ====
The following members comprised the Serbian jury:

- Sanja Ilić (jury chairperson) – composer, represented Serbia in 2018 with Balkanika
- Aleksandra Milutinović – composer
- Leontina Vukomanović – singer, composer
- Silvana Grujić – editor of music programme RTS
- Vojislav Aralica (Voja) – music producer

Detailed voting results from Serbia (Semi-final 1)
R/O	Country	Jury							Televote	
R/O	Country	S. Ilić	A. Milutinović	L. Vukomanović	S. Grujić	Voja	Rank	Points	Rank	Points
01	Cyprus	4	5	4	3	4	3	8	11	
02	Montenegro	1	1	1	1	1	1	12	3	8
03	Finland	10	14	13	14	7	11		15	
04	Poland	9	13	10	4	8	8	3	13	
05	Slovenia	7	4	3	5	3	4	7	2	10
06	Czech Republic	2	3	2	2	2	2	10	10	1
07	Hungary	3	2	5	11	5	5	6	1	12
08	Belarus	6	6	9	7	9	7	4	7	4
09	Serbia									
10	Belgium	15	7	14	13	13	13		14	
11	Georgia	14	11	12	12	11	14		16	
12	Australia	5	9	8	6	6	6	5	4	7
13	Iceland	16	16	16	16	16	16		5	6
14	Estonia	13	10	7	8	15	10	1	8	3
15	Portugal	12	15	15	15	14	15		12	
16	Greece	8	8	6	9	10	9	2	9	2
17	San Marino	11	12	11	10	12	12		6	5

Detailed voting results from Serbia (Final)
R/O	Country	Jury							Televote	
R/O	Country	S. Ilić	A. Milutinović	L. Vukomanović	S. Grujić	Voja	Rank	Points	Rank	Points
01	Malta	14	12	5	20	12	12		19	
02	Albania	20	15	25	25	25	25		15	
03	Czech Republic	9	8	6	10	2	7	4	12	
04	Germany	10	9	17	22	20	17		24	
05	Russia	16	6	16	9	19	14		3	8
06	Denmark	13	18	10	14	1	9	2	16	
07	San Marino	21	24	24	24	8	18		10	1
08	North Macedonia	2	1	2	7	3	1	12	1	12
09	Sweden	3	3	4	1	18	3	8	17	
10	Slovenia	12	23	11	15	10	16		2	10
11	Cyprus	11	13	9	12	9	13		18	
12	Netherlands	7	7	13	13	17	11		8	3
13	Greece	24	22	18	21	13	22		23	
14	Israel	25	20	14	17	16	20		22	
15	Norway	22	19	15	5	14	15		7	4
16	United Kingdom	19	17	22	16	15	21		25	
17	Iceland	17	25	21	18	21	24		6	5
18	Estonia	6	14	12	2	4	5	6	21	
19	Belarus	18	16	23	19	22	23		13	
20	Azerbaijan	1	11	19	4	23	8	3	14	
21	France	8	10	7	11	24	10	1	20	
22	Italy	5	2	1	6	6	2	10	4	7
23	Serbia									
24	Switzerland	4	4	8	8	7	6	5	5	6
25	Australia	15	5	3	3	5	4	7	11	
26	Spain	23	21	20	23	11	19		9	2
