= Estonia in the Eurovision Song Contest 2019 =

- Eurovision Song Contest 2019
- Participating broadcaster: Eesti Rahvusringhääling (ERR)
- Country: Estonia
- Selection process: Eesti Laul 2019
- Selection date: 16 February 2019

Competing entry
- Song: "Storm"
- Artist: Victor Crone
- Songwriters: Stig Rästa; Vallo Kikas; Victor Crone; Fred Krieger

Placement
- Semi-final result: Qualified (4th, 198 points)
- Final result: 20th, 76 points

Participation chronology

Estonia was represented at the Eurovision Song Contest 2019 with the song "Storm" written by Stig Rästa, Vallo Kikas, Victor Crone and Fred Krieger. The song was performed by Victor Crone. The Estonian broadcaster Eesti Rahvusringhääling (ERR) organised the national final Eesti Laul 2019 in order to select the Estonian entry for the 2019 contest in Tel Aviv, Israel. The national final consisted of three shows: two semi-finals and a final. Twelve songs competed in each semi-final and six from each semi-final as determined by a jury panel and public vote qualified to the final. In the final, the winner was selected over two rounds of voting. In the first round, a jury panel and a public vote selected the top three to qualify to the superfinal. In the superfinal, "Storm" performed by Victor Crone was selected as the winner entirely by a public vote.

Estonia was drawn to compete in the first semi-final of the Eurovision Song Contest which took place on 14 May 2019. Performing during the show in position 14, "Storm" was announced among the top 10 entries of the first semi-final and therefore qualified to compete in the final on 18 May. It was later revealed that Estonia placed fourth out of the 17 participating countries in the semi-final with 198 points. In the final, Estonia performed in position 18 and placed twentieth out of the 26 participating countries, scoring 76 points.

== Background ==
Prior to the 2019 contest, Estonia had participated in the Eurovision Song Contest twenty-four times since its first entry in 1994, winning the contest on one occasion in 2001 with the song "Everybody" performed by Tanel Padar, Dave Benton and 2XL. Following the introduction of semi-finals for the 2004 contest, Estonia has, to this point, managed to qualify to the final on six occasions. In 2018, "La forza" performed by Elina Nechayeva managed to qualify Estonia to the final where the song placed eighth.

The Estonian national broadcaster, Eesti Rahvusringhääling (ERR), broadcasts the event within Estonia and organises the selection process for the nation's entry. ERR confirmed Estonia's participation at the 2019 Eurovision Song Contest on 3 September 2018. Since their debut, the Estonian broadcaster has organised national finals that feature a competition among multiple artists and songs in order to select Estonia's entry for the Eurovision Song Contest. The Eesti Laul competition has been organised since 2009 in order to select Estonia's entry and also on 3 September 2018, ERR announced the organisation of Eesti Laul 2019 in order to select the nation's 2019 entry.

== Before Eurovision ==
=== Eesti Laul 2019 ===
Eesti Laul 2019 was the eleventh edition of the Estonian national selection Eesti Laul, which selected Estonia's entry for the Eurovision Song Contest 2019. The competition consisted of twenty entries competing in two semi-finals on 31 January and 2 February 2019 leading to a twelve-song final on 16 February 2019. All three shows were broadcast on Eesti Televisioon (ETV) and on ETV+ with Russian commentary as well as streamed online at the broadcaster's official website err.ee. The final was also broadcast via radio on Raadio 2 with commentary by Erik Morna, Margus Kamlat, Bert Järvet and Kristo Rajasaare.

==== Format ====
The format of the competition included two semi-finals on 31 January and 2 February 2019 and a final on 16 February 2019. Twelve songs competed in each semi-final and the top six from each semi-final qualified to complete the twelve song lineup in the final. The results of the semi-finals was determined by the 50/50 combination of votes from a professional jury and public televoting for the first four qualifiers and a second round of public televoting for the fifth and sixth qualifiers. The winning song in the final was selected over two rounds of voting: the first round results selected the top three songs via the 50/50 combination of jury and public voting, while the second round (superfinal) determined the winner solely by public televoting. In addition to winning the right to represent Estonia at the 2019 Eurovision Song Contest, the winning songwriters and producers were also awarded monetary prizes of €3,000 and €1,000, respectively. The Estonian Authors' Society and Estonian Performers Association also awarded a monetary prize of €1,000 to the top three entries.

==== Competing entries ====
On 1 October 2018, ERR opened the submission period for artists and composers to submit their entries up until 6 November 2018 through an online upload platform. Each artist and songwriter was only able to submit a maximum of five entries. Foreign collaborations were allowed as long as 50% of the songwriters were Estonian. A fee was also imposed on songs being submitted to the competition, with €25 for songs in the Estonian language and €50 for songs in other languages. 216 submissions were received by the deadline. A 12-member jury panel selected 24 semi-finalists from the submissions and the selected songs were announced during the ETV entertainment program Ringvaade on 15 November 2018. The selection jury consisted of Ivar Must (composer), Lenna Kuurmaa (singer), Kaupo Karelson (television producer), Leen Kadakas (Universal Music Baltics manager), Vaido Pannel (Raadio Sky+ music editor), Allan Roosileht (Star FM presenter), Laura Põldvere (singer), Karl-Erik Taukar (singer), Dagmar Oja (singer), Rolf Roosalu (singer), Renee Meriste (music manager) and Sten Teppan (Vikerraadio music editor).

Among the competing artists were previous Eurovision Song Contest entrants Sandra Nurmsalu, who represented Estonia as part of the group Urban Symphony in 2009, Birgit, who represented Estonia in 2013, and Tanja, who represented Estonia in 2014. Grete Paia, Inga, Jaan Pehk, Kerli Kivilaan, Kristel Aaslaid (Öed), Tuuli Rand (Öed), Sofia Rubina-Hunter, Stefan and Uku Suviste have all competed in previous editions of Eesti Laul. Victor Crone's entry was written by Stig Rästa, who represented Estonia in 2015 with Elina Born.

Artist	Song	Songwriter(s)
Around the Sun	"Follow Me Back"	Daniel Rukovitškin, Georg Eessaar
Cätlin Mägi and Jaan Pehk	"Parmumäng"	Cätlin Mägi, Jaan Pehk
Grete Paia	"Kui isegi kaotan"	Grete Paia, Mihkel Mattisen, Timo Vendt, Kerli Puusepp
Inger	"Coming Home"	Inger Fridolin, Karl-Ander Reismann
Iseloomad	"Kaks miinust"	Vilho Meier, Siim Randveer
Jennifer Cohen	"Little Baby El"	Chris Hierro, Jennifer Marisse Cohen, Luisa Lõhmus
Johanna Eendra	"Miks sa teed nii?"	Johanna Eendra, Joosep Eendra
Kadiah	"Believe"	Kadi Poll
Kaia Tamm	"Wo sind die Katzen?"	Kaia Tamm
Kerli Kivilaan	"Cold Love"	Kerli Kivilaan, Egert Milder, Andres Kõpper
Lacy Jay	"Halleluja"	Ago Teppand, Lacy Nicole Jones, Hugo Martin Maasikas
Lumevärv feat. Inga	"Milline päev"	Margus Piik, Kermo Hert, Jana Hallas
Marko Kaar	"Smile"	Marko Kaar, Egert Kanep
Öed	"Öhuloss"	Tuuli Rand, Kristel Aaslaid, Bert Prikenfeld, Egert Milder
Ranele	"Supernova"	Marek Rosenberg, Lauri Lembinen, Marco Margna, Anne Loho
Sandra Nurmsalu	"Soovide puu"	Priit Pajusaar, Sandra Nurmsalu, Aapo Ilves
Sissi	"Strong"	Karl-Ander Reismann, Sissi Nylia Benita
Sofia Rubina feat. Janika Tenn	"Deep Water"	Sofia Rubina-Hunter, Janika Tenn, Oljana Kallson
Stefan	"Without You"	Stefan Airapetjan, Karl-Ander Reismann
Synne Valtri	"I'll Do It My Way"	Sünne Valtri
The Swingers, Tanja and Birgit	"High Heels in the Neighbourhood"	Tanja Mihhailova, Timo Vendt, Mihkel Mattisen
Uku Suviste	"Pretty Little Liar"	Uku Suviste, Oliver Mazurtšak
Victor Crone	"Storm"	Stig Rästa, Vallo Kikas, Victor Crone, Fred Krieger
Xtra Basic and Emily J	"Hold Me Close"	Andrei Zevakin, Igor Volhonski

==== Semi-finals ====
The two semi-finals took place on 31 January and 2 February 2019 at the University of Tartu Sports Hall in Tartu, hosted by Ott Sepp and Piret Krumm. In each semi-final twelve songs competed for the first four spots in the final with the outcome decided upon by the combination of the votes from a jury panel and a public televote which registered 23,372 votes in the first semi-final and 23,633 votes in the second semi-final; the remaining two qualifiers were decided by an additional televote between the remaining non-qualifiers which registered 7,038 votes in the first semi-final and 11,175 votes in the second semi-final. The jury panel that voted in the semi-finals consisted of Toomas Olljum, Maiken, Tanel Padar, Sven Lõhmus, Berk Vaher, Kristjan Hirmo, Margus Kamlat, Jüri Pootsmann and Luisa Rõivas.

First round (jury and televote) qualifier Second round (televote-only) qualifier

Semi-final 1 (First round) – 31 January 2019
R/O	Artist	Song	Jury		Televote		Total	Place
R/O	Artist	Song	Votes	Points	Votes	Points	Total	Place
1	The Swingers, Tanja and Birgit	"High Heels in the Neighbourhood"	45	6	2,088	7	13	4
2	Marko Kaar	"Smile"	5	0	439	0	0	12
3	Xtra Basic and Emily J	"Hold Me Close"	25	1	1,802	6	7	8
4	Johanna Eendra	"Miks sa teed nii?"	34	2	796	2	4	10
5	Stefan	"Without You"	86	12	2,668	8	20	2
6	Sandra Nurmsalu	"Soovide puu"	37	4	1,677	5	9	5
7	Jennifer Cohen	"Little Baby El"	42	5	1,083	3	8	6
8	Sofia Rubina feat. Janika Tenn	"Deep Water"	48	7	747	1	8	7
9	Öed	"Öhuloss"	36	3	1,219	4	7	9
10	Victor Crone	"Storm"	82	10	6,346	12	22	1
11	Ranele	"Supernova"	8	0	666	0	0	11
12	Inger	"Coming Home"	74	8	3,841	10	18	3

Semi-final 1 (Second round) – 31 January 2019
Artist	Song	Televote	Place
Jennifer Cohen	"Little Baby El"	1,102	3
Johanna Eendra	"Miks sa teed nii?"	494	6
Marko Kaar	"Smile"	252	8
Öed	"Öhuloss"	854	5
Ranele	"Supernova"	325	7
Sandra Nurmsalu	"Soovide puu"	1,736	1
Sofia Rubina feat. Janika Tenn	"Deep Water"	1,073	4
Xtra Basic and Emily J	"Hold Me Close"	1,202	2

Semi-final 2 (First round) – 2 February 2019
R/O	Artist	Song	Jury		Televote		Total	Place
R/O	Artist	Song	Votes	Points	Votes	Points	Total	Place
1	Synne Valtri	"I'll Do It My Way"	28	1	2,729	8	9	7
2	Iseloomad	"Kaks miinust"	38	5	762	0	5	10
3	Lumevärv feat. Inga	"Milline päev"	58	8	1,386	3	11	5
4	Sissi	"Strong"	55	7	2,557	6	13	4
5	Cätlin Mägi and Jaan Pehk	"Parmumäng"	37	4	1,240	2	6	9
6	Kadiah	"Believe"	49	6	2,663	7	13	3
7	Kaia Tamm	"Wo sind die Katzen?"	20	0	1,112	1	1	12
8	Kerli Kivilaan	"Cold Love"	75	12	1,488	5	17	2
9	Grete Paia	"Kui isegi kaotan"	22	0	2,752	10	10	6
10	Lacy Jay	"Halleluja"	35	2	1,467	4	6	8
11	Around the Sun	"Follow Me Back"	36	3	842	0	3	11
12	Uku Suviste	"Pretty Little Liar"	71	10	4,635	12	22	1

Semi-final 2 (Second round) – 2 February 2019
Artist	Song	Televote	Place
Around the Sun	"Follow Me Back"	629	7
Cätlin Mägi and Jaan Pehk	"Parmumäng"	778	6
Grete Paia	"Kui isegi kaotan"	1,230	4
Iseloomad	"Kaks miinust"	394	8
Kaia Tamm	"Wo sind die Katzen?"	1,023	5
Lacy Jay	"Halleluja"	2,009	3
Lumevärv feat. Inga	"Milline päev"	2,284	2
Synne Valtri	"I'll Do It My Way"	2,828	1

==== Final ====
The final took place on 16 February 2019 at the Saku Suurhall in Tallinn, hosted by Karl-Erik Taukar and Piret Krumm. The six entries that qualified from each of the two preceding semi-finals, all together twelve songs, competed during the show. The winner was selected over two rounds of voting. In the first round, a jury (50%) and public televote (50%) determined the top three entries to proceed to the superfinal. The public vote in the first round registered 54,896 votes. In the superfinal, "Storm" performed by Victor Crone was selected as the winner entirely by a public televote. The public televote in the superfinal registered 51,148 votes. In addition to the performances of the competing entries, Ivo Linna, who represented Estonia in the Eurovision Song Contest 1996, Getter Jaani, who represented Estonia in the Eurovision Song Contest 2011, and Elina Nechayeva, who represented Estonia in the Eurovision Song Contest 2018, performed as the interval acts. The jury panel that voted in the first round of the final consisted of Stig Karlsen (Melodi Grand Prix music director), AFSHeen (American producer and composer), Guna Zučika (Latvian music manager), Ben Camp (American songwriter), Cyrus Saidi (American music manager), Lörinc Bubno (Hungarian Eurovision Head of Delegation) and Josh Cumbee (American singer, producer and songwriter).

Final – 16 February 2019
R/O	Artist	Song	Jury		Televote		Total	Place
R/O	Artist	Song	Votes	Points	Votes	Points	Total	Place
1	Sissi	"Strong"	46	8	2,990	6	14	4
2	Lumevärv feat. Inga	"Milline päev"	46	10	2,188	2	12	5
3	Victor Crone	"Storm"	25	2	15,513	12	14	3
4	Kerli Kivilaan	"Cold Love"	43	7	1,481	0	7	9
5	Xtra Basic and Emily J	"Hold Me Close"	21	0	1,440	0	0	12
6	Kadiah	"Believe"	25	3	2,287	3	6	10
7	Synne Valtri	"I'll Do It My Way"	4	0	2,323	4	4	11
8	Stefan	"Without You"	70	12	6,132	7	19	1
9	The Swingers, Tanja and Birgit	"High Heels in the Neighbourhood"	26	4	2,737	5	9	7
10	Uku Suviste	"Pretty Little Liar"	36	5	8,987	10	15	2
11	Inger	"Coming Home"	24	1	6,904	8	9	6
12	Sandra Nurmsalu	"Soovide puu"	40	6	1,914	1	7	8

Detailed Jury Votes
R/O	Song	S. Karlsen	AFSHeen	G. Zučika	B. Camp	C. Saidi	L. Bubnó	J. Cumbee	Total
1	"Strong"	3	10	8	6	6	10	3	46
2	"Milline päev"	4	12		8	10	4	8	46
3	"Storm"	5	4	2	3	2	3	6	25
4	"Cold Love"	1	7	5	10	7	6	7	43
5	"Hold Me Close"		6	4	4	4	1	2	21
6	"Believe"	6	3	6		3	7		25
7	"I'll Do It My Way"	2					2		4
8	"Without You"	7	8	7	12	12	12	12	70
9	"High Heels in the Neighbourhood"	10		1	1	8	5	1	26
10	"Pretty Little Liar"	12	1	3	7	1	8	4	36
11	"Coming Home"		5	12	2			5	24
12	"Soovide puu"	8	2	10	5	5		10	40

Superfinal – 16 February 2019
R/O	Artist	Song	Televote	Place
1	Victor Crone	"Storm"	23,270	1
2	Stefan	"Without You"	12,380	3
3	Uku Suviste	"Pretty Little Liar"	15,498	2

== At Eurovision ==
According to Eurovision rules, all nations with the exceptions of the host country and the "Big Five" (France, Germany, Italy, Spain and the United Kingdom) are required to qualify from one of two semi-finals in order to compete for the final; the top ten countries from each semi-final progress to the final. The European Broadcasting Union (EBU) split up the competing countries into six different pots based on voting patterns from previous contests, with countries with favourable voting histories put into the same pot. On 28 January 2019, a special allocation draw was held which placed each country into one of the two semi-finals, as well as which half of the show they would perform in. Estonia was placed into the first semi-final, to be held on 14 May 2019, and was scheduled to perform in the second half of the show.

Once all the competing songs for the 2019 contest had been released, the running order for the semi-finals was decided by the shows' producers rather than through another draw, so that similar songs were not placed next to each other. Estonia was set to perform in position 14, following the entry from Iceland and before the entry from Portugal.

The two semi-finals and the final were broadcast in Estonia on ETV with commentary in Estonian by Marko Reikop and on ETV+ with commentary in Russian by Aleksandr Hobotov and Julia Kalenda. The Estonian spokesperson, who announced the top 12-point score awarded by the Estonian jury during the final, was Kelly Sildaru.

=== Semi-final ===
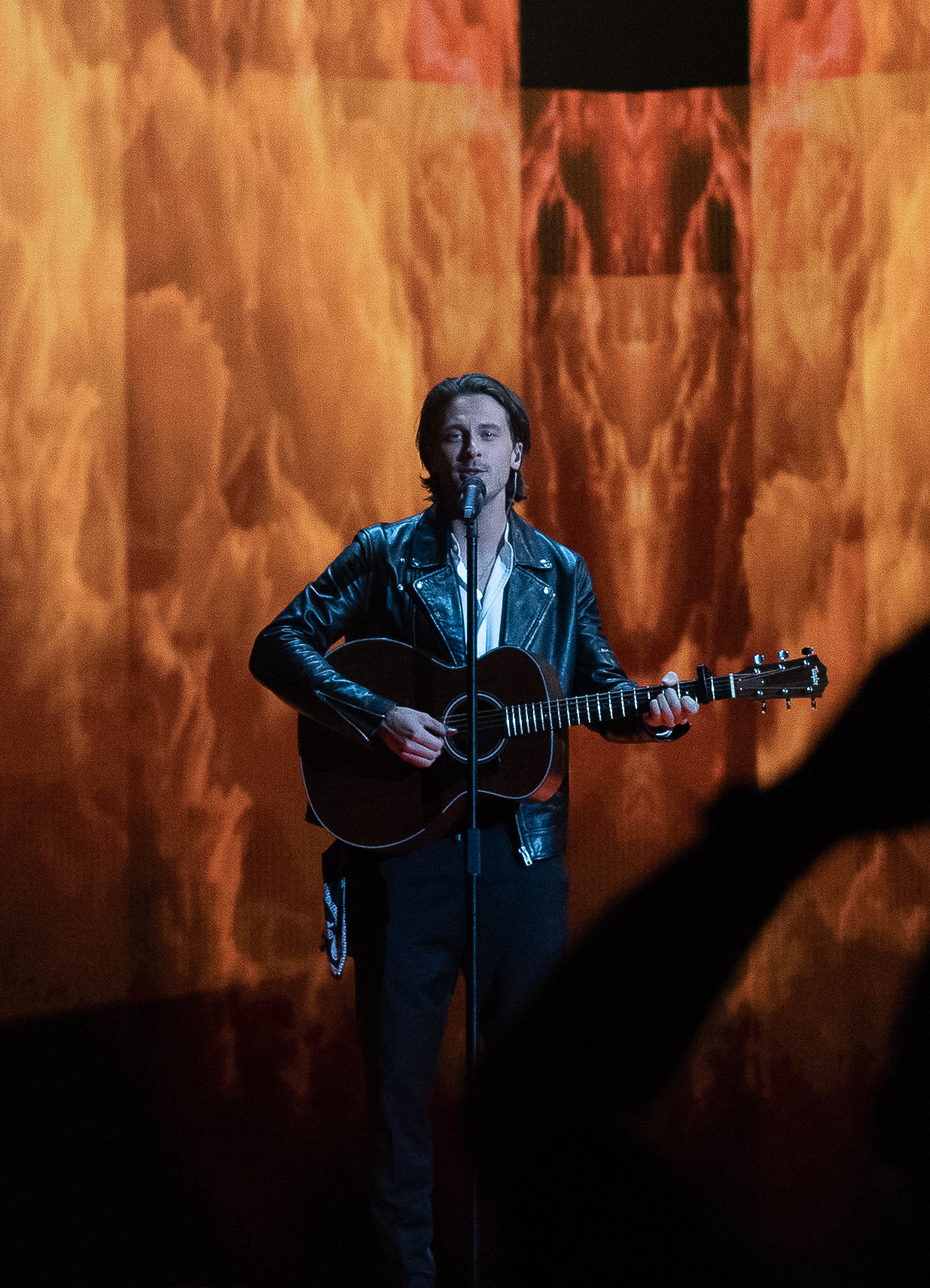
Victor Crone during a rehearsal before the first semi-final

Estonia performed fourteenth in the first semi-final, following the entry from Iceland and preceding the entry from Portugal. At the end of the show, Estonia was announced as having finished in the top 10 and subsequently qualifying for the grand final. It was later revealed that Estonia placed fourth in the semi-final, receiving a total of 198 points: 133 points from the televoting and 65 points from the juries. At Eurovision, Kaire Vilgats, Dagmar Oja, Kaido Põldma, Lars Gunnar Säfsund and author Stig Rästa joined Crone off-stage as backing singers during the live performance. The actress and singer Saara Kadak, who supported Crone on stage during the Estonian national final, withdrew due to her wedding day and upcoming premiere of the musical West Side Story at the Estonian National Opera.

=== Final ===
Shortly after the first semi-final, a winner's press conference was held for the ten qualifying countries. As part of this press conference, the qualifying artists took part in a draw to determine which half of the grand final they would subsequently participate in. This draw was done in the order the countries were announced during the semi-final. Estonia was drawn to compete in the second half. Following this draw, the shows' producers decided upon the running order of the final, as they had done for the semi-finals. Estonia was subsequently placed to perform in position 18, following the entry from Iceland and before the entry from Belarus. At the conclusion of the voting, Estonia finished in twentieth place, scoring 76 points: 48 points from the televoting and 26 points from the juries.

=== Voting ===
Voting during the three shows involved each country awarding two sets of points from 1-8, 10 and 12: one from their professional jury and the other from televoting. Each nation's jury consisted of five music industry professionals who are citizens of the country they represent, with their names published before the contest to ensure transparency. This jury judged each entry based on: vocal capacity; the stage performance; the song's composition and originality; and the overall impression by the act. In addition, no member of a national jury was permitted to be related in any way to any of the competing acts in such a way that they cannot vote impartially and independently. The individual rankings of each jury member as well as the nation's televoting results were released shortly after the grand final.

Below is a breakdown of points awarded to Estonia and awarded by Estonia in the first semi-final and grand final of the contest, and the breakdown of the jury voting and televoting conducted during the two shows:

==== Points awarded to Estonia ====
Points awarded to Estonia (Semi-final 1)
Score	Televote	Jury
12 points	Belgium; Portugal	Belarus
10 points	Finland; Israel	Israel
8 points	Czech Republic; Georgia; Hungary; San Marino; Slovenia	Georgia
7 points	Australia; Cyprus; Iceland; Poland	Belgium; Iceland
6 points	Belarus; Spain	Finland; Hungary
5 points		Portugal
4 points		
3 points	Greece; Serbia	
2 points	Montenegro	
1 point	France	France; Serbia; Slovenia; Spain

Points awarded to Estonia (Final)
Score	Televote	Jury
12 points		
10 points	Latvia; Sweden	
8 points	Denmark; Finland	Israel
7 points		
6 points		Serbia
5 points		Italy; Latvia
4 points	Lithuania	
3 points	Iceland	
2 points	Norway	Denmark
1 point	Czech Republic; Ireland; Slovenia	Croatia; Czech Republic

==== Points awarded by Estonia ====
Points awarded by Estonia (Semi-final 1)
Score	Televote	Jury
12 points	Finland	Czech Republic
10 points	San Marino	Belarus
8 points	Czech Republic	Cyprus
7 points	Slovenia	Poland
6 points	Iceland	Serbia
5 points	Australia	Hungary
4 points	Belgium	Greece
3 points	Hungary	San Marino
2 points	Poland	Iceland
1 point	Belarus	Australia

Points awarded by Estonia (Final)
Score	Televote	Jury
12 points	Russia	Sweden
10 points	Norway	Switzerland
8 points	Netherlands	Czech Republic
7 points	Slovenia	Netherlands
6 points	Denmark	Russia
5 points	Iceland	Azerbaijan
4 points	Switzerland	Serbia
3 points	Sweden	France
2 points	Australia	Denmark
1 point	Azerbaijan	Belarus

==== Detailed voting results ====
The following members comprised the Estonian jury:

- Kaupo Karelson (jury chairperson) – television producer
- Reet Linna – TV host
- Sandra Sersant – artist manager
- Mikk Targo – chairman of the Board of the Estonian Authors' Society
- Uku Suviste – singer-songwriter, future Estonian representative in the 2021 contest

Detailed voting results from Estonia (Semi-final 1)
R/O	Country	Jury							Televote	
R/O	Country	K. Karelson	R. Linna	S. Sersant	M. Targo	U. Suviste	Rank	Points	Rank	Points
01	Cyprus	3	3	3	4	7	3	8	14	
02	Montenegro	11	14	8	7	14	11		16	
03	Finland	12	12	12	11	11	15		1	12
04	Poland	1	5	2	5	12	4	7	9	2
05	Slovenia	10	13	10	9	13	12		4	7
06	Czech Republic	2	6	1	1	1	1	12	3	8
07	Hungary	9	15	5	2	6	6	5	8	3
08	Belarus	7	2	4	3	2	2	10	10	1
09	Serbia	8	1	14	12	4	5	6	13	
10	Belgium	14	11	11	8	15	14		7	4
11	Georgia	13	10	13	14	8	13		11	
12	Australia	16	4	16	15	5	10	1	6	5
13	Iceland	6	9	9	6	9	9	2	5	6
14	Estonia									
15	Portugal	15	16	15	16	16	16		15	
16	Greece	5	7	6	13	3	7	4	12	
17	San Marino	4	8	7	10	10	8	3	2	10

Detailed voting results from Estonia (Final)
R/O	Country	Jury							Televote	
R/O	Country	K. Karelson	R. Linna	S. Sersant	M. Targo	U. Suviste	Rank	Points	Rank	Points
01	Malta	21	17	14	7	23	18		16	
02	Albania	23	23	23	17	11	23		25	
03	Czech Republic	6	10	3	2	10	3	8	13	
04	Germany	15	16	24	18	8	19		23	
05	Russia	5	6	8	14	1	5	6	1	12
06	Denmark	2	13	12	15	21	9	2	5	6
07	San Marino	20	25	22	9	25	22		12	
08	North Macedonia	17	18	16	19	2	11		18	
09	Sweden	3	1	1	1	3	1	12	8	3
10	Slovenia	11	19	9	8	7	12		4	7
11	Cyprus	10	20	7	10	13	13		19	
12	Netherlands	7	5	2	20	4	4	7	3	8
13	Greece	18	22	19	21	15	24		22	
14	Israel	24	21	20	22	20	25		24	
15	Norway	22	14	15	11	17	20		2	10
16	United Kingdom	19	15	10	12	6	15		21	
17	Iceland	14	11	6	13	22	16		6	5
18	Estonia									
19	Belarus	16	12	13	3	18	10	1	15	
20	Azerbaijan	13	2	5	4	9	6	5	10	1
21	France	9	8	11	5	16	8	3	17	
22	Italy	12	7	17	23	12	17		11	
23	Serbia	4	9	18	25	5	7	4	20	
24	Switzerland	1	4	4	6	14	2	10	7	4
25	Australia	25	3	25	16	19	14		9	2
26	Spain	8	24	21	24	24	21		14	
