= Melodifestivalen 2019 =

Swedish music competition

Dates and venue
- Heat 1: 2 February 2019
- Heat 2: 9 February 2019
- Heat 3: 16 February 2019
- Heat 4: 23 February 2019
- Second chance: 2 March 2019
- Final: 9 March 2019

Production
- Broadcaster: Sveriges Television (SVT)
- Director: Robin Hofwander; Fredrik Bäcklund
- Presenters: Sarah Dawn Finer; Kodjo Akolor; Marika Carlsson; Eric Saade

Participants
- Number of entries: 28
- Number of finalists: 12

Vote
- Winning song: "Too Late for Love" by John Lundvik

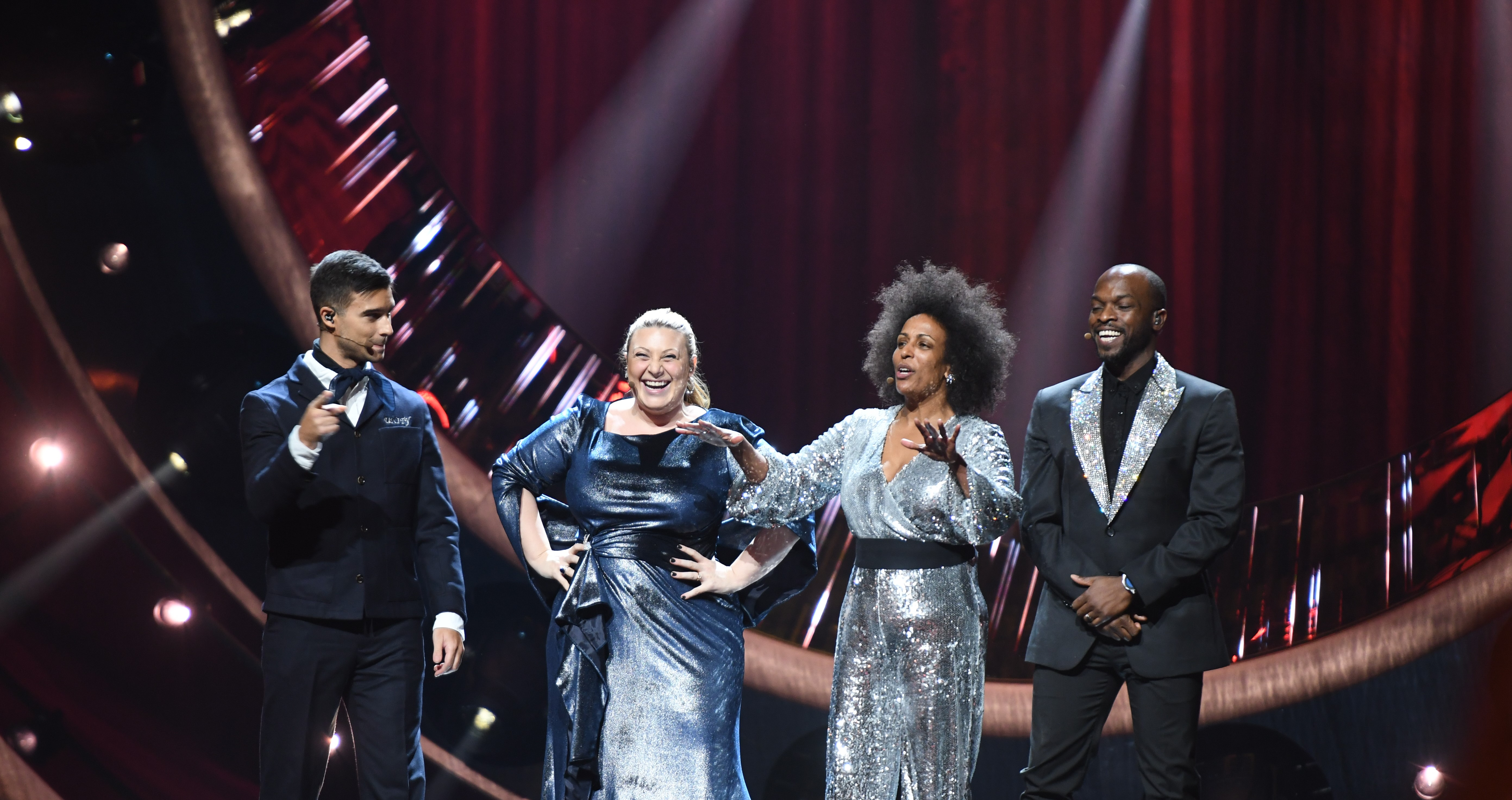
Eric Saade, Sarah Dawn Finer, Marika Carlsson, and Kodjo Akolor, presenters of Melodifestivalen 2019

Melodifestivalen 2019 was the 59th edition of the Swedish music competition Melodifestivalen and was held from 2 February to 9 March 2019. Presenters were Sarah Dawn Finer, Kodjo Akolor, Marika Carlsson and Eric Saade. The winner of the contest is John Lundvik with the song "Too Late for Love". He represented Sweden in the Eurovision Song Contest 2019 in Tel Aviv, Israel, finishing in 5th place.

== Format ==
Melodifestivalen 2019, organised by Sveriges Television (SVT), was the eighteenth consecutive edition of the contest in which the competition took place in different cities across Sweden. The four heats were held at the Scandinavium in Gothenburg (2 February), the Malmö Arena in Malmö (9 February), the Tegera Arena in Leksand (16 February) and the Sparbanken Lidköping Arena in Lidköping (23 February). The Second Chance round took place at the Rosvalla Nyköping Eventcenter in Nyköping on 2 March while the final was held at the Friends Arena in Stockholm on 9 March. An initial 28 entries competed in the heats, with seven entries taking part in each show. The top two entries from each heat advanced directly to the final, while the third and fourth placed entries advanced to the Second Chance round. The bottom three entries in each heat were eliminated after two rounds of voting. An additional four entries qualified for the final from the Second Chance round, bringing the total number of competing entries in the final to 12.

Edward af Sillén returned as a consultant and adviser, producing various interval acts for the hosts.

Competition Schedule
Show	Date	City	Venue
Heat 1	2 February 2019	Gothenburg	Scandinavium
Heat 2	9 February 2019	Malmö	Malmö Arena
Heat 3	16 February 2019	Leksand	Tegera Arena
Heat 4	23 February 2019	Lidköping	Sparbanken Lidköping Arena
Second Chance	2 March 2019	Nyköping	Rosvalla Nyköping Eventcenter
Final	9 March 2019	Stockholm	Friends Arena

=== Presenters ===
In October 2018, Sarah Dawn Finer, Kodjo Akolor, Marika Carlsson and Eric Saade were announced as the presenters for Melodifestivalen.

=== Voting ===
SVT revised the voting system for the 2019 edition following concerns that the previous proportional voting system favoured younger voters, who made up the main demographic of app users. The public vote was divided into eight groups: seven age-based groups for app voters and one for telephone voters. In the heats, each group awarded 12, 10, 8, 6, 4, 2, and 1 points; in the final, 12, 10, 8–1 points; and in the second-chance round, one point to the more popular entry in each duel. To ensure equal weighting between the public and international jury votes in the final, the number of juries was reduced from eleven to eight. SMS voting was also discontinued in 2019 due to declining usage in previous years.

== Competing entries ==
The twenty-eight competing entries were announced to the public during a press conference on 27 November 2018.

Artist	Song	Songwriter(s)
Andreas Johnson	"Army of Us"	Andreas Johnson, Jimmy Jansson, Sara Ryan, Andreas ”Stone” Johansson, Sebastian Thott
Ann-Louise Hanson	"Kärleken finns kvar"	David Lindgren Zacharias, Josefin Glenmark, Olof "Ollie" Olsen
Anna Bergendahl	"Ashes to Ashes"	Thomas G:son, Bobby Ljunggren, Erik Bernholm, Anna Bergendahl
Anton Hagman	"Känner dig"	Gusten Dahlqvist, Oliver Forsmark, Anton Hagman, Jakob Hjulström
Arja Saijonmaa	"Mina fyra årstider"	Göran Sparrdal, Arja Saijonmaa
Arvingarna	"I Do"	Nanne Grönvall, Mikael Karlsson, Casper Jarnebrink, Thomas “Plec” Johansson
Bishara	"On My Own"	Markus Sepehrmanesh, Benjamin Ingrosso, Robert "Deadbeat" Habolin
Dolly Style	"Habibi"	Jimmy Jansson, Palle Hammarlund, Robert Norberg
Hanna Ferm & Liamoo	"Hold You"	Jimmy Jansson, Anton Hård af Segerstad, Fredrik Sonefors, Hanna Ferm, Liam Pablito Cacatian Thomassen
High15	"No Drama"	Joy Deb, Linnea Deb, Kate Tizzard
Jan Malmsjö	"Leva livet"	Anderz Wrethov, Elin Wrethov, Johan Bejerholm, Ari Lehtonen
John Lundvik	"Too Late for Love"	John Lundvik, Anderz Wrethov, Andreas “Stone” Johansson
Jon Henrik Fjällgren	"Norrsken (Goeksegh)"	Fredrik Kempe, David Kreuger, Niklas Carson Mattsson, Jon Henrik Fjällgren
Lina Hedlund	"Victorious"	Melanie Wehbe, Richard Edwards, Dino Medanhodzic, Johanna Jansson
Lisa Ajax	"Torn"	Isa Molin
Malou Prytz	"I Do Me"	Isa Tengblad, Elvira Anderfjärd, Fanny Arnesson, Adéle Cechal
Margaret	"Tempo"	Anderz Wrethov, Jimmy Jansson, Laurell Barker, Sebastian von Koenigsegg
Martin Stenmarck	"Låt skiten brinna"	Uno Svenningsson, Tim Larsson, Tobias Lundgren
Mohombi	"Hello"	Alexandru Florin Cotoi, Thomas G:son, Mohombi Moupondo, Linnea Deb
Nano	"Chasing Rivers"	Lise Cabble, Linnea Deb, Joy Deb, Thomas G:son, Nano Omar
Omar Rudberg	"Om om och om igen"	Omar Rudberg, Johan Lindbrandt, Robin Stjernberg, Jens Hult
Oscar Enestad	"I Love It"	Emanuel Abrahamsson, Parker James, Oscar Enestad
Pagan Fury	"Stormbringer"	Tobias Gustavsson, Fredrik Thomander, Anders Wikström, Mia Stegmar
Rebecka Karlsson	"Who I Am"	Rebecka Karlsson, Anderz Wrethov, Henric Pierroff
The Lovers of Valdaro	"Somebody Wants"	Peter Boström, Thomas G:son, Erik Gabriel Høiby
Vlad Reiser	"Nakna i regnet"	Lukas Nathansson, John Hårleman, Vladislav Meletjenkov, Chris Enberg
Wiktoria	"Not with Me"	Joy Deb, Linnea Deb, Wiktoria Johansson
Zeana feat. Anis don Demina	"Mina bränder"	Thomas G:son, Jimmy Jansson, Anis Don Demina, Pa Moudou Badjie, Robin Svensk

== Heats ==
=== Heat 1 ===
The first heat took place on 2 February 2019 at the Scandinavium arena in Gothenburg. A total of 7,158,333 votes were cast throughout the show with a total of 573,040 SEK collected for Radiohjälpen.

R/O	Artist	Song	Televote/App		Place	Result
R/O	Artist	Song	Votes	Points	Place	Result
1	Nano	"Chasing Rivers"	1,096,662	54	4	Second chance
2	High15	"No Drama"	814,839	19	6	Out
3	Wiktoria	"Not with Me"	1,431,954	90	1	Final
4	Zeana feat. Anis don Demina	"Mina bränder"	980,354	38	5	Out
5	Arja Saijonmaa	"Mina fyra årstider"	507,727	15	7	Out
6	Mohombi	"Hello"	1,218,685	68	2	Final
7	Anna Bergendahl	"Ashes to Ashes"	1,108,102	60	3	Second chance

Detailed televoting results
R/O	Song	Age groups							Tel.
R/O	Song	3‍–‍9	10‍–‍15	16‍–‍29	30‍–‍44	45‍–‍59	60‍–‍74	75+	Tel.
1	"Not with Me"	12	12	12	12	10	10	12	10
2	"Hello"	8	10	10	10	8	8	6	8
3	"Ashes to Ashes"	2	2	4	8	12	12	8	12
4	"Chasing Rivers"	4	8	8	6	6	6	10	6
5	"Mina bränder"	10	6	6	4	4	2	4	2
6	"No Drama"	6	4	2	2	2	1	1	1
7	"Mina fyra årstider"	1	1	1	1	1	4	2	4

=== Heat 2 ===
The second heat took place on 9 February 2019 at the Malmö Arena in Malmö. A total of 6,993,333 votes were cast throughout the show with a total of 522,183 SEK collected for Radiohjälpen.

R/O	Artist	Song	Televote/App		Place	Result
R/O	Artist	Song	Votes	Points	Place	Result
1	Andreas Johnson	"Army of Us"	973,171	52	4	Second chance
2	Malou Prytz	"I Do Me"	1,233,974	76	2	Final
3	Oscar Enestad	"I Love It"	739,501	15	7	Out
4	Jan Malmsjö	"Leva livet"	630,359	15	6	Out
5	Vlad Reiser	"Nakna i regnet"	991,531	52	3	Second chance
6	Hanna Ferm & Liamoo	"Hold You"	1,531,720	94	1	Final
7	Margaret	"Tempo"	892,945	40	5	Out

Detailed televoting results
R/O	Song	Age groups							Tel.
R/O	Song	3‍–‍9	10‍–‍15	16‍–‍29	30‍–‍44	45‍–‍59	60‍–‍74	75+	Tel.
1	"Hold You"	10	12	12	12	12	12	12	12
2	"I Do Me"	12	10	10	10	8	8	8	10
3	"Nakna i regnet"	8	8	8	4	4	4	10	6
4	"Army of Us"	4	2	6	8	10	10	4	8
5	"Tempo"	6	6	4	6	6	6	2	4
6	"Leva livet"	1	1	1	1	1	2	6	2
7	"I Love It"	2	4	2	2	2	1	1	1

=== Heat 3 ===
The third heat took place on 16 February 2019 at the Tegera Arena in Leksand. A total of 6,305,045 votes were cast throughout the show with a total of 662,869 SEK collected for Radiohjälpen.

R/O	Artist	Song	Televote/App		Place	Result
R/O	Artist	Song	Votes	Points	Place	Result
1	The Lovers of Valdaro	"Somebody Wants"	637,917	13	7	Out
2	Dolly Style	"Habibi"	819,062	40	5	Out
3	Martin Stenmarck	"Låt skiten brinna"	862,017	46	4	Second chance
4	Lina Hedlund	"Victorious"	1,051,399	76	2	Final
5	Omar Rudberg	"Om om och om igen"	722,215	19	6	Out
6	Rebecka Karlsson	"Who I Am"	1,059,419	70	3	Second chance
7	Jon Henrik Fjällgren	"Norrsken (Goeksegh)"	1,112,548	80	1	Final

Detailed televoting results
R/O	Song	Age groups							Tel.
R/O	Song	3‍–‍9	10‍–‍15	16‍–‍29	30‍–‍44	45‍–‍59	60‍–‍74	75+	Tel.
1	"Norrsken (Goeksegh)"	4	10	12	8	10	12	12	12
2	"Victorious"	10	8	8	12	12	10	10	6
3	"Who I Am"	8	12	10	10	8	6	6	10
4	"Låt skiten brinna"	6	2	4	4	6	8	8	8
5	"Habibi"	12	6	2	6	2	4	4	4
6	"Om om och om igen"	1	4	6	2	1	1	2	2
7	"Somebody Wants"	2	1	1	1	4	2	1	1

=== Heat 4 ===
The fourth heat took place on 23 February 2019 at the Sparbanken Lidköping Arena in Lidköping. A total of 6,810,817 votes were cast throughout the show with a total of 905,041 SEK collected for Radiohjälpen.

R/O	Artist	Song	Televote/App		Place	Result
R/O	Artist	Song	Votes	Points	Place	Result
1	Pagan Fury	"Stormbringer"	579,502	18	7	Out
2	Anton Hagman	"Känner dig"	601,113	21	6	Out
3	Lisa Ajax	"Torn"	1,166,263	56	3	Second chance
4	Arvingarna	"I Do"	895,957	54	4	Second chance
5	Bishara	"On My Own"	1,497,326	84	2	Final
6	Ann-Louise Hanson	"Kärleken finns kvar"	583,995	25	5	Out
7	John Lundvik	"Too Late for Love"	1,465,231	86	1	Final

Detailed televoting results
R/O	Song	Age groups							Tel.
R/O	Song	3‍–‍9	10‍–‍15	16‍–‍29	30‍–‍44	45‍–‍59	60‍–‍74	75+	Tel.
1	"Too Late for Love"	8	8	10	12	12	12	12	12
2	"On My Own"	12	12	12	10	10	8	10	10
3	"Torn"	10	10	8	8	6	4	6	4
4	"I Do"	4	4	6	6	8	10	8	8
5	"Kärleken finns kvar"	1	2	2	2	2	6	4	6
6	"Känner dig"	6	6	4	1	1	1	1	1
7	"Stormbringer"	2	1	1	4	4	2	2	2

== Second Chance ==
The Second Chance round took place on 2 March 2019 at the Rosvalla Nyköping Eventcenter in Nyköping. A total of 7,244,085 votes were cast throughout the show with a total of 949,238 SEK collected for Radiohjälpen.

Duel	R/O	Artist	Song	Televote/App		Result
Duel	R/O	Artist	Song	Votes	Points	Result
I	1	Andreas Johnson	"Army of Us"	693,105	0	Out
I	2	Anna Bergendahl	"Ashes to Ashes"	1,174,531	8	Final
II	1	Vlad Reiser	"Nakna i regnet"	713,742	1	Out
II	2	Nano	"Chasing Rivers"	1,147,998	7	Final
III	1	Martin Stenmarck	"Låt skiten brinna"	671,850	1	Out
III	2	Lisa Ajax	"Torn"	1,116,086	7	Final
IV	1	Rebecka Karlsson	"Who I Am"	793,704	2	Out
IV	2	Arvingarna	"I Do"	933,069	6	Final

Detailed televoting results
Duel	R/O	Song	Age groups							Tel.	Total
Duel	R/O	Song	3‍–‍9	10‍–‍15	16‍–‍29	30‍–‍44	45‍–‍59	60‍–‍74	75+	Tel.	Total
I	1	"Ashes to Ashes"	1	1	1	1	1	1	1	1	8
I	2	"Army of Us"	0	0	0	0	0	0	0	0	0
II	1	"Chasing Rivers"	0	1	1	1	1	1	1	1	7
II	2	"Nakna i regnet"	1	0	0	0	0	0	0	0	1
III	1	"Torn"	1	1	1	1	1	0	1	1	7
III	2	"Låt skiten brinna"	0	0	0	0	0	1	0	0	1
IV	1	"I Do"	0	0	1	1	1	1	1	1	6
IV	2	"Who I Am"	1	1	0	0	0	0	0	0	2

== Final ==
The Final took place on 9 March 2019 at Friends Arena in Stockholm. A total of 15,757,707 votes were cast throughout the show with a total of 4,273,096 SEK collected for Radiohjälpen.

R/O	Artist	Song	Juries	Public	Total	Place
1	Jon Henrik Fjällgren	"Norrsken (Goeksegh)"	19	55	74	4
2	Lisa Ajax	"Torn"	39	23	62	9
3	Mohombi	"Hello"	32	42	74	5
4	Lina Hedlund	"Victorious"	32	8	40	11
5	Bishara	"On My Own"	38	69	107	2
6	Anna Bergendahl	"Ashes to Ashes"	20	36	56	10
7	Nano	"Chasing Rivers"	54	10	64	8
8	Hanna Ferm & Liamoo	"Hold You"	48	59	107	3
9	Malou Prytz	"I Do Me"	23	12	35	12
10	John Lundvik	"Too Late for Love"	96	85	181	1
11	Wiktoria	"Not with Me"	36	28	64	6
12	Arvingarna	"I Do"	27	37	64	7

Detailed International Jury Votes
R/O	Song	Portugal	Austria	Australia	Cyprus	France	Finland	United Kingdom	Israel	Total
R/O	Song	Portugal	Austria	Australia	Cyprus	France	Finland	United Kingdom	Israel	Total
1	"Norrsken (Goeksegh)"	1		8	1	1		8		19
2	"Torn"	6	10	2	3	5	6	1	6	39
3	"Hello"	5	2	7	7	2		4	5	32
4	"Victorious"	3	8		4		4	3	10	32
5	"On My Own"	7	1	3	6	10	10		1	38
6	"Ashes to Ashes"				2		5	6	7	20
7	"Chasing Rivers"	10	4	10	8	7	2	5	8	54
8	"Hold You"	8	6	6	5	6	7	7	3	48
9	"I Do Me"	4	5	5		4	1	2	2	23
10	"Too Late for Love"	12	12	12	12	12	12	12	12	96
11	"Not with Me"	2	3	1	10	8	8		4	36
12	"I Do"		7	4		3	3	10		27
International Jury Spokespersons
Portugal – Carla Bugalho; Austria – Marvin Dietmann; Australia – Paul Clarke; Cyprus – Evi Papamichael; France – Bruno Berberes; Finland – Krista Siegfrids; United Kingdom – Simon Proctor; Israel – Dana International

Detailed televoting results
R/O	Song	Votes	Age groups							Tel.	Total
R/O	Song	Votes	3‍–‍9	10‍–‍15	16‍–‍29	30‍–‍44	45‍–‍59	60‍–‍74	75+	Tel.	Total
1	"Norrsken (Goeksegh)"	1,398,299	8	4	7	6	5	7	8	10	55
2	"Torn"	1,164,997	7	7	4	2			3		23
3	"Hello"	1,349,171	10	6	5	8	3	1	5	4	42
4	"Victorious"	883,187	2			1	2	3			8
5	"On My Own"	1,719,337	12	12	10	7	7	5	10	6	69
6	"Ashes to Ashes"	1,143,408				5	10	10	4	7	36
7	"Chasing Rivers"	951,266	3	2	1		1	2		1	10
8	"Hold You"	1,592,988	6	10	8	10	8	6	6	5	59
9	"I Do Me"	1,010,600	4	3	2				1	2	12
10	"Too Late for Love"	2,211,811	5	8	12	12	12	12	12	12	85
11	"Not with Me"	1,173,276	1	5	6	3	4	4	2	3	28
12	"I Do"	1,159,367		1	3	4	6	8	7	8	37

== Gallery ==
=== Heat 1 ===
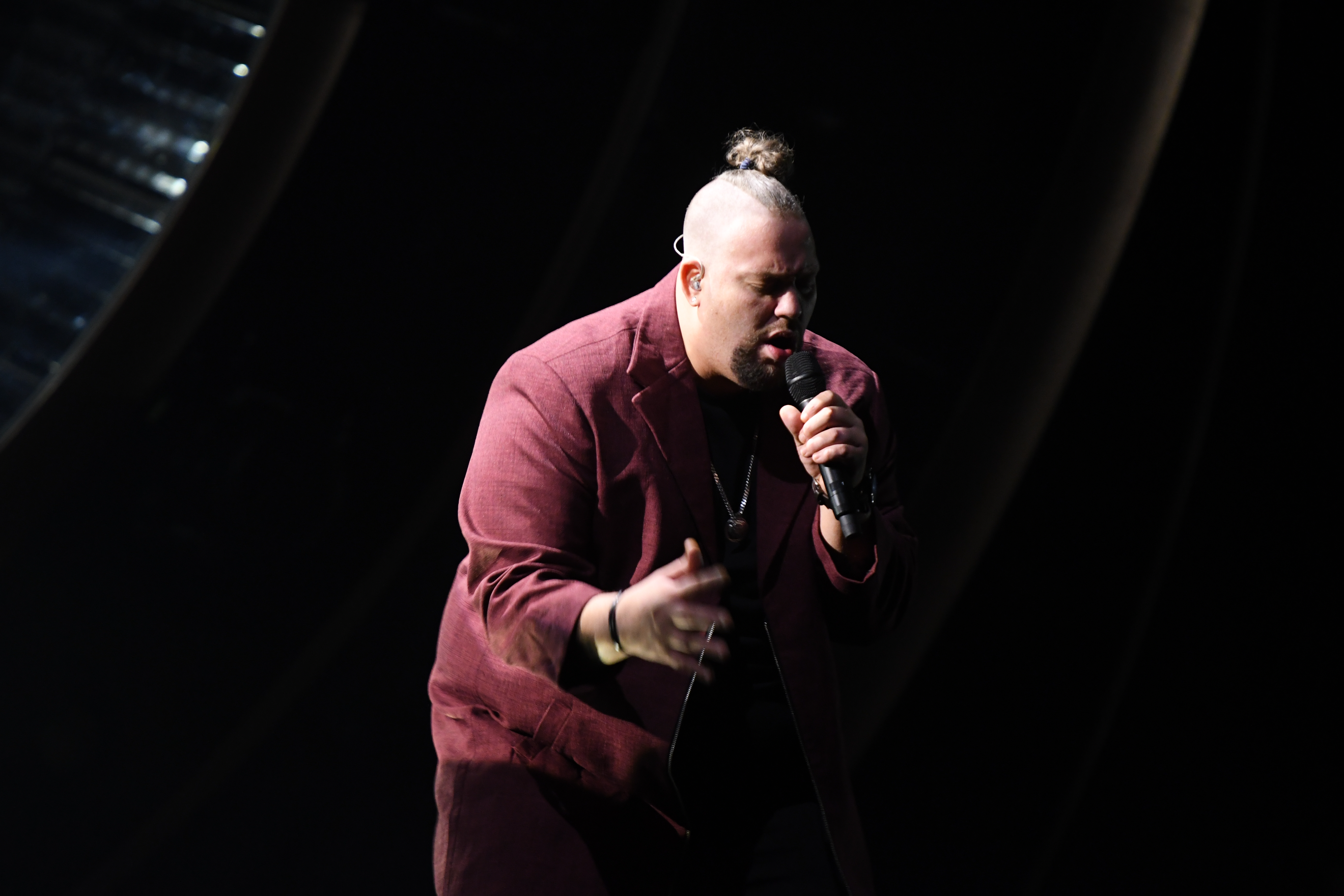
Nano - "Chasing Rivers"

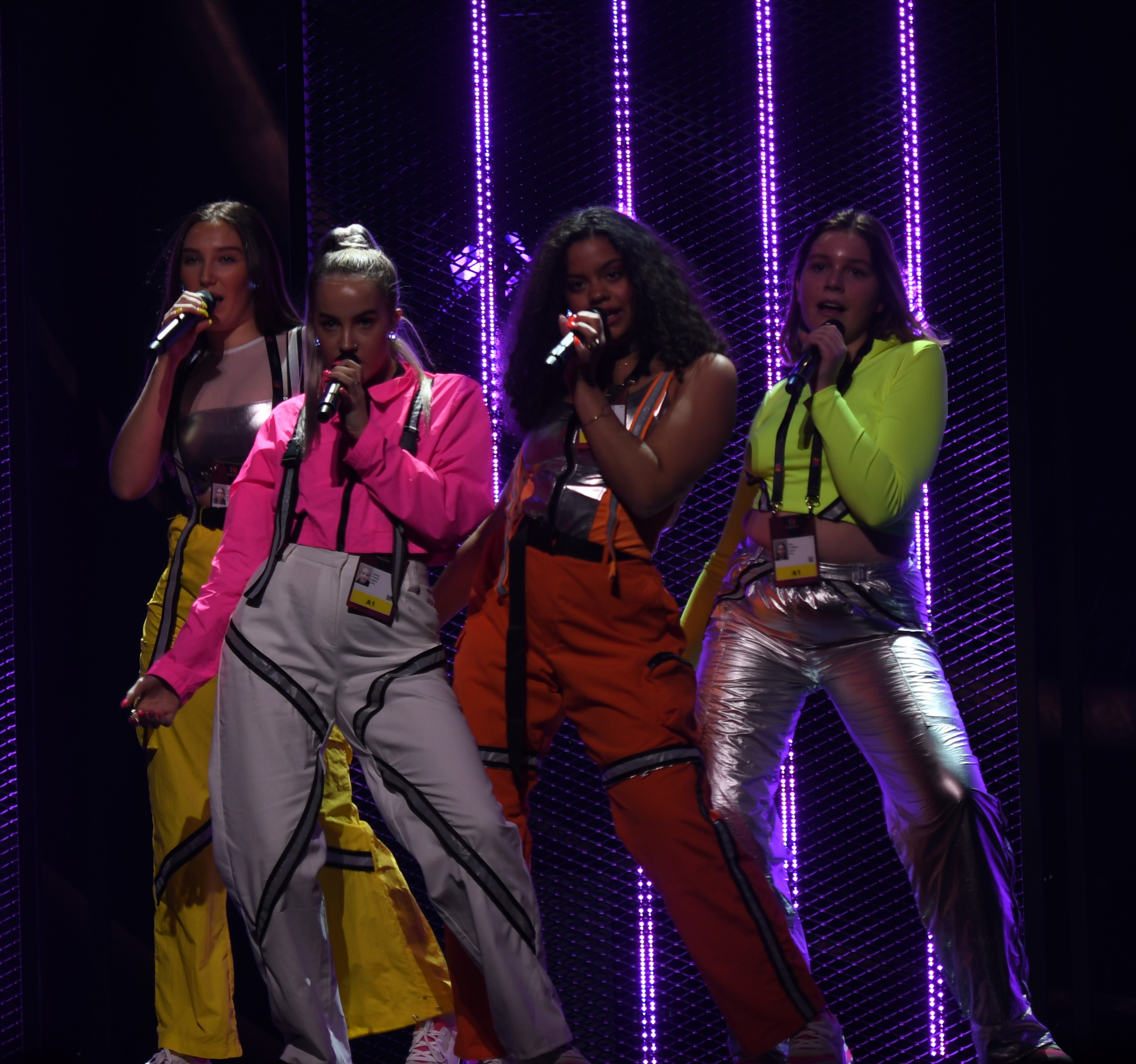
High15 - "No Drama"

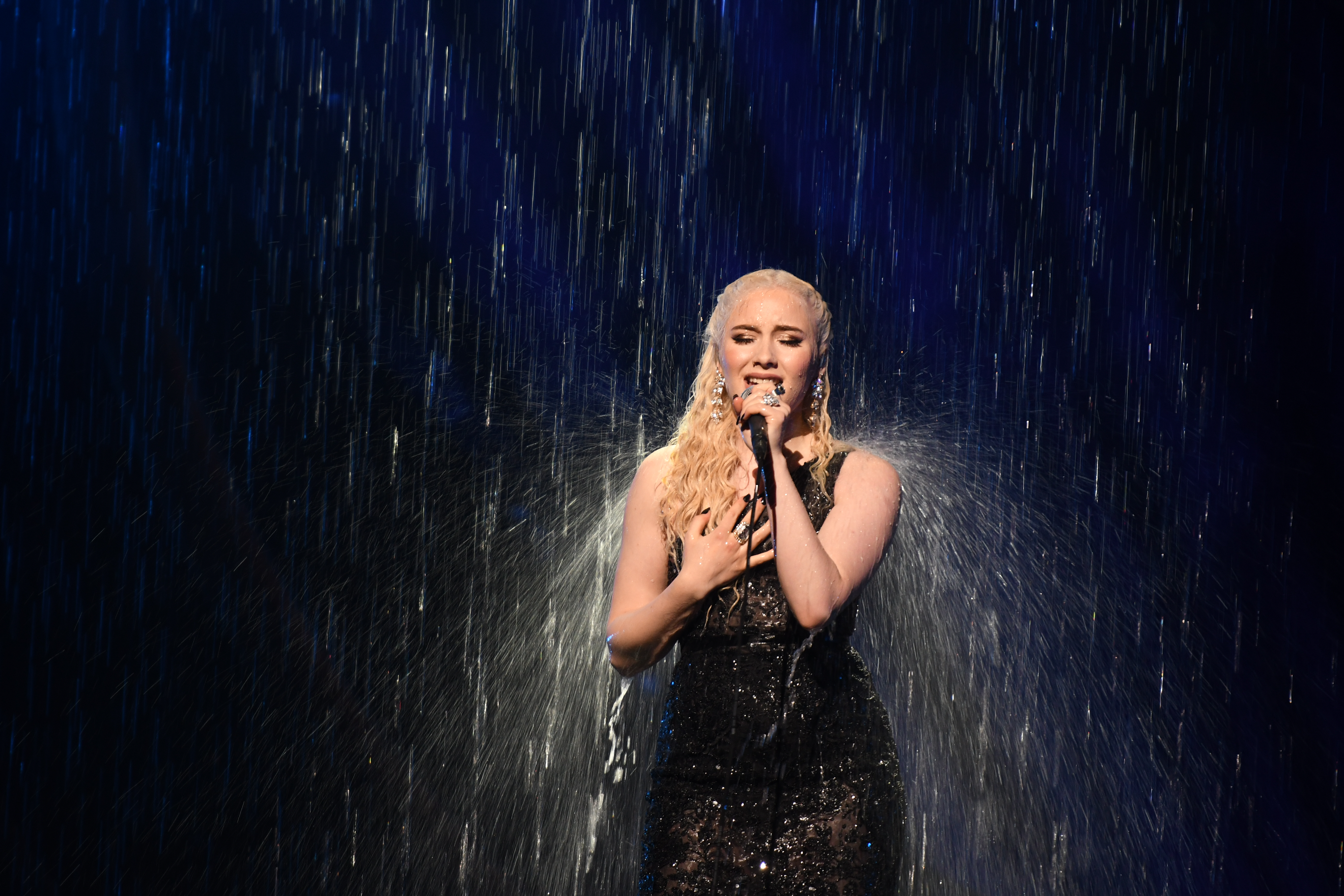
Wiktoria - "Not With Me"

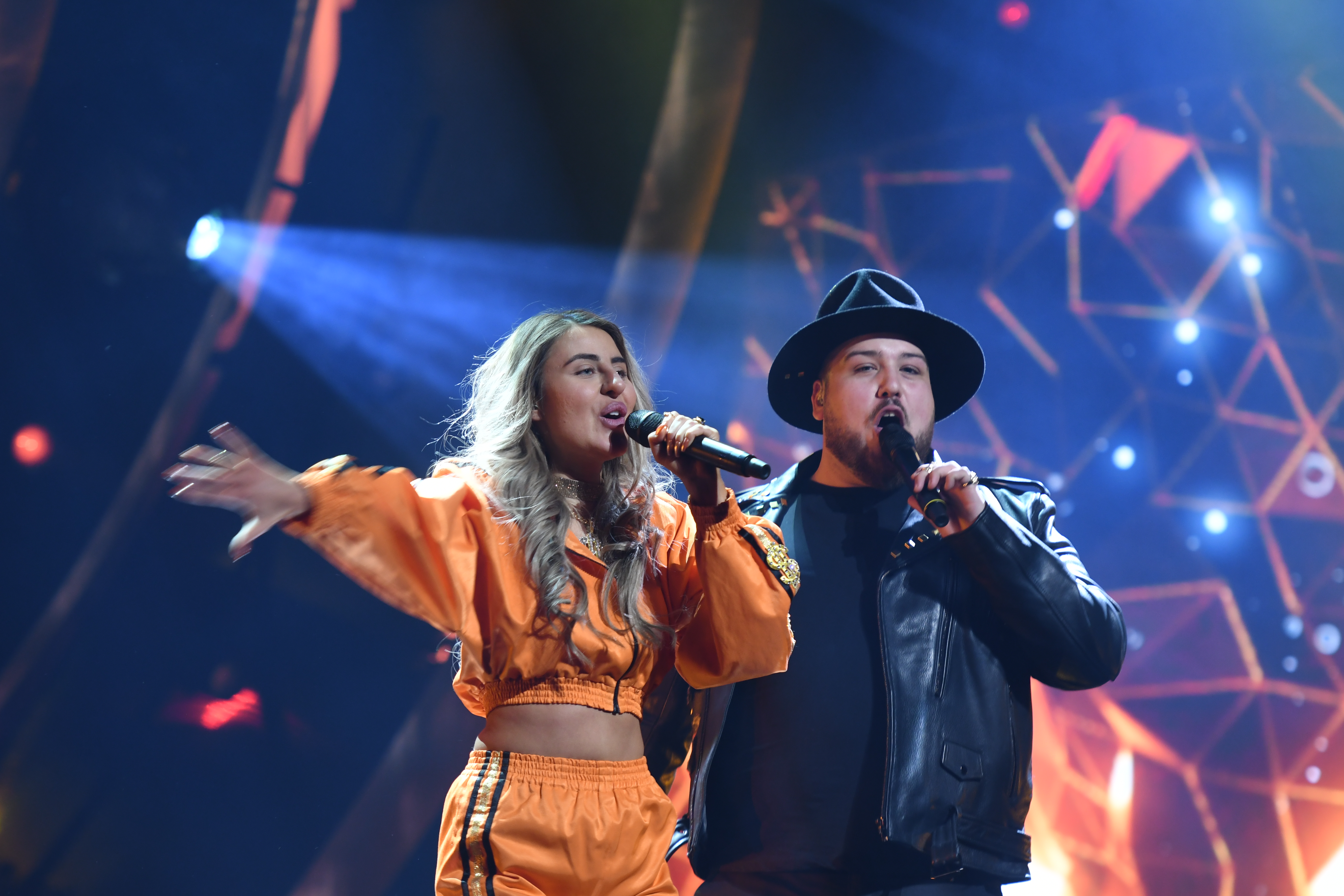
Zeana feat. Anis Don Demina - "Mina bränder"

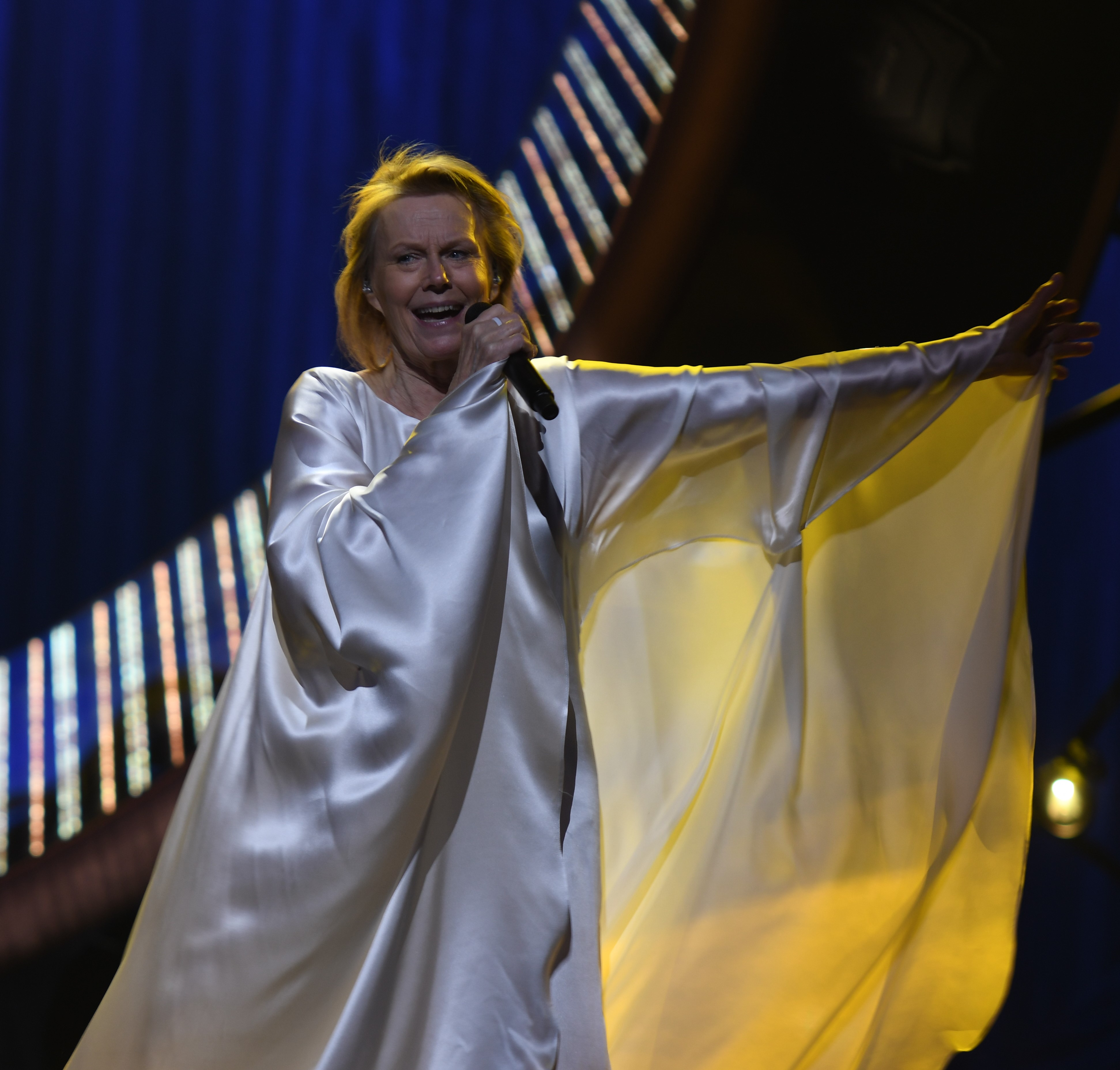
Arja Saijonmaa - "Mina fyra årstider"

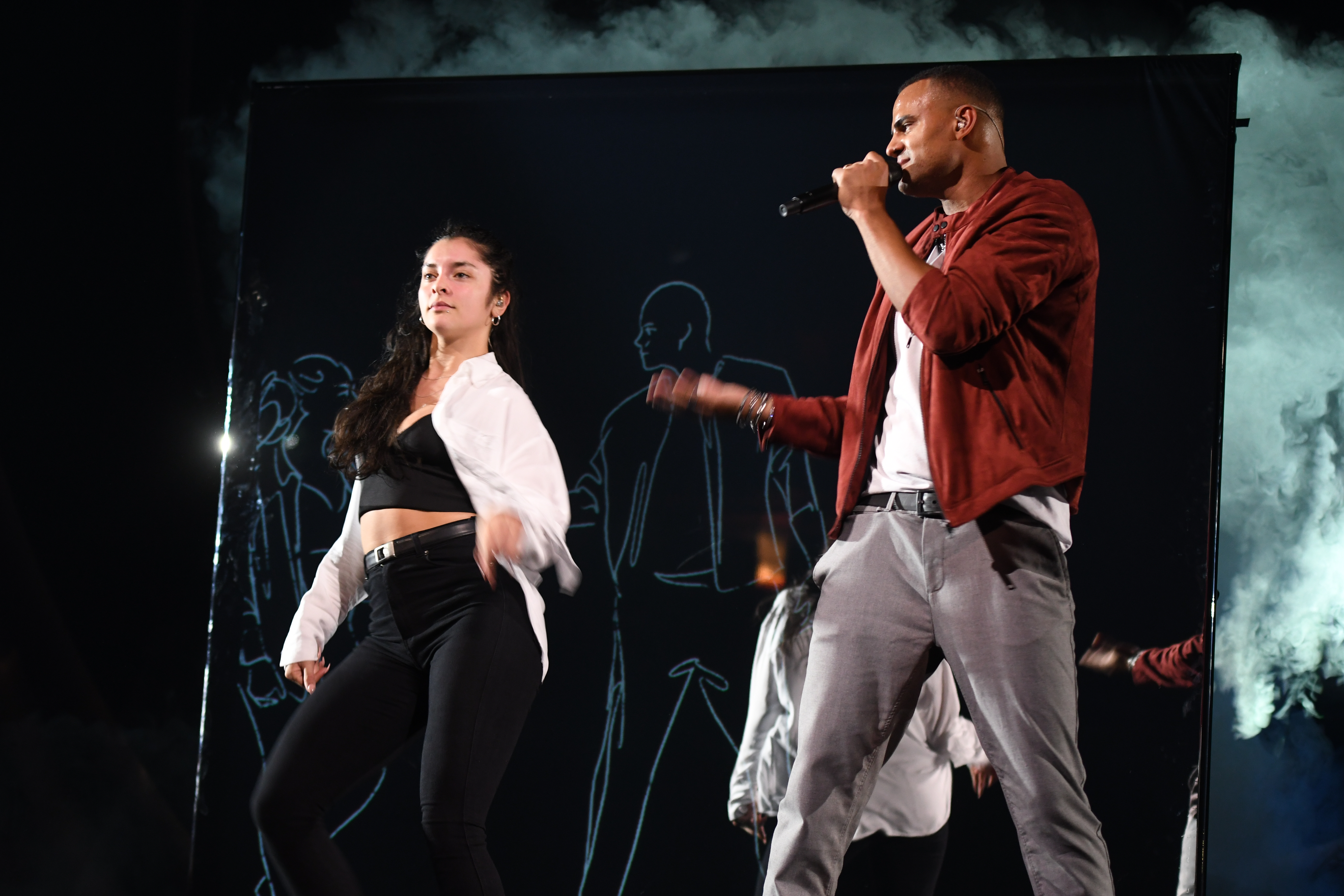
Mohombi - "Hello"

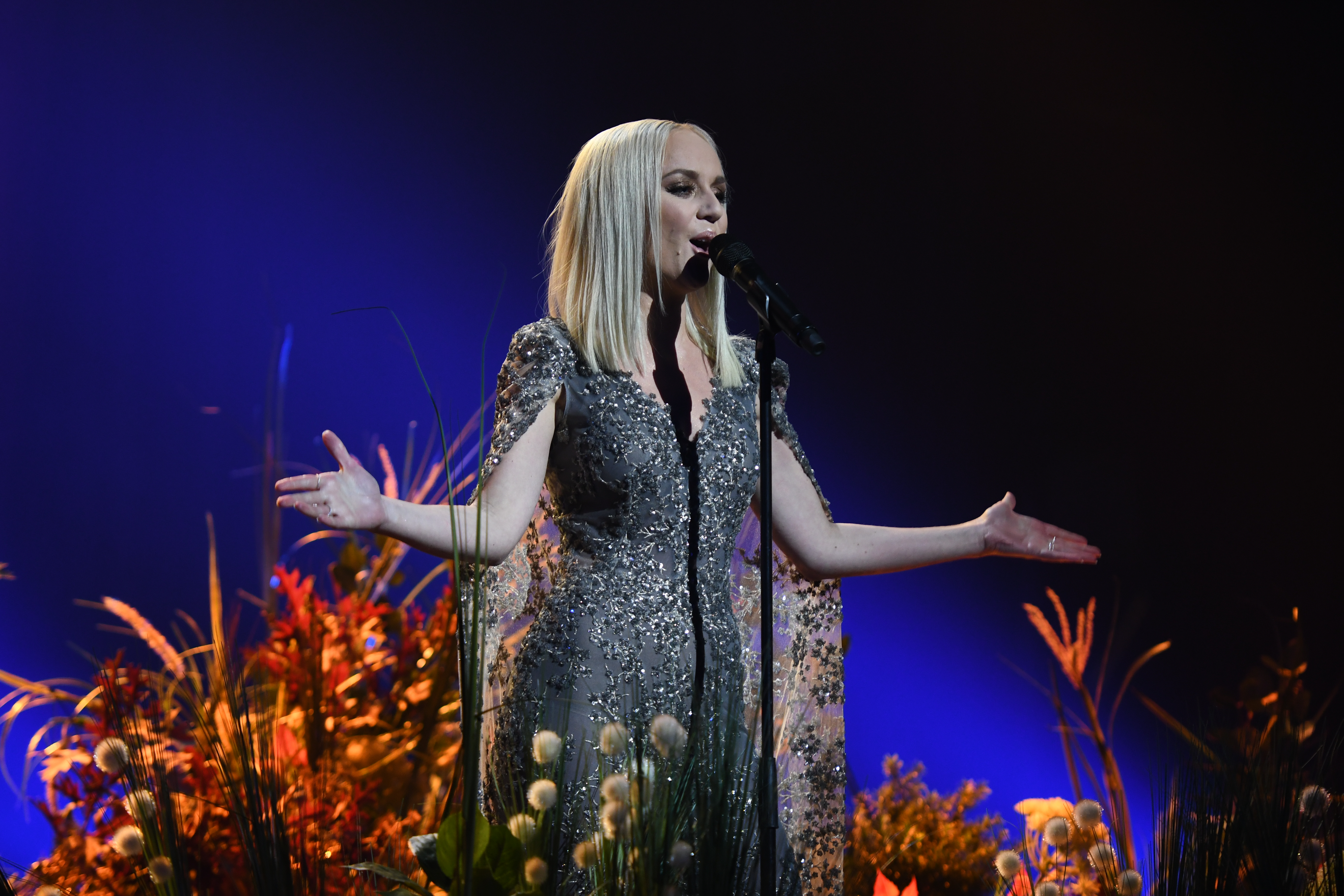
Anna Bergendahl - "Ashes to Ashes"

=== Heat 2 ===
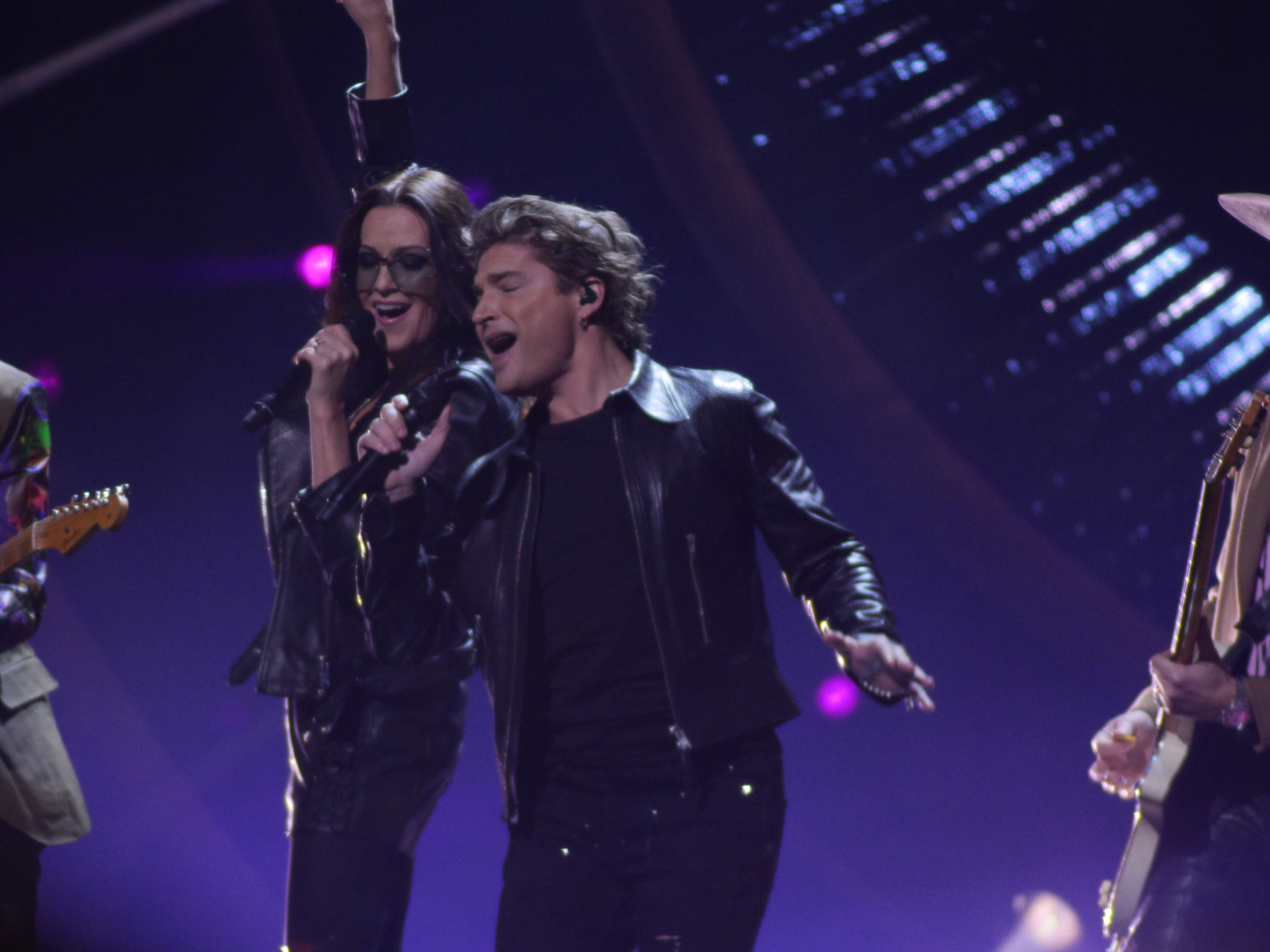
Andreas Johnsson - "Army of Us"

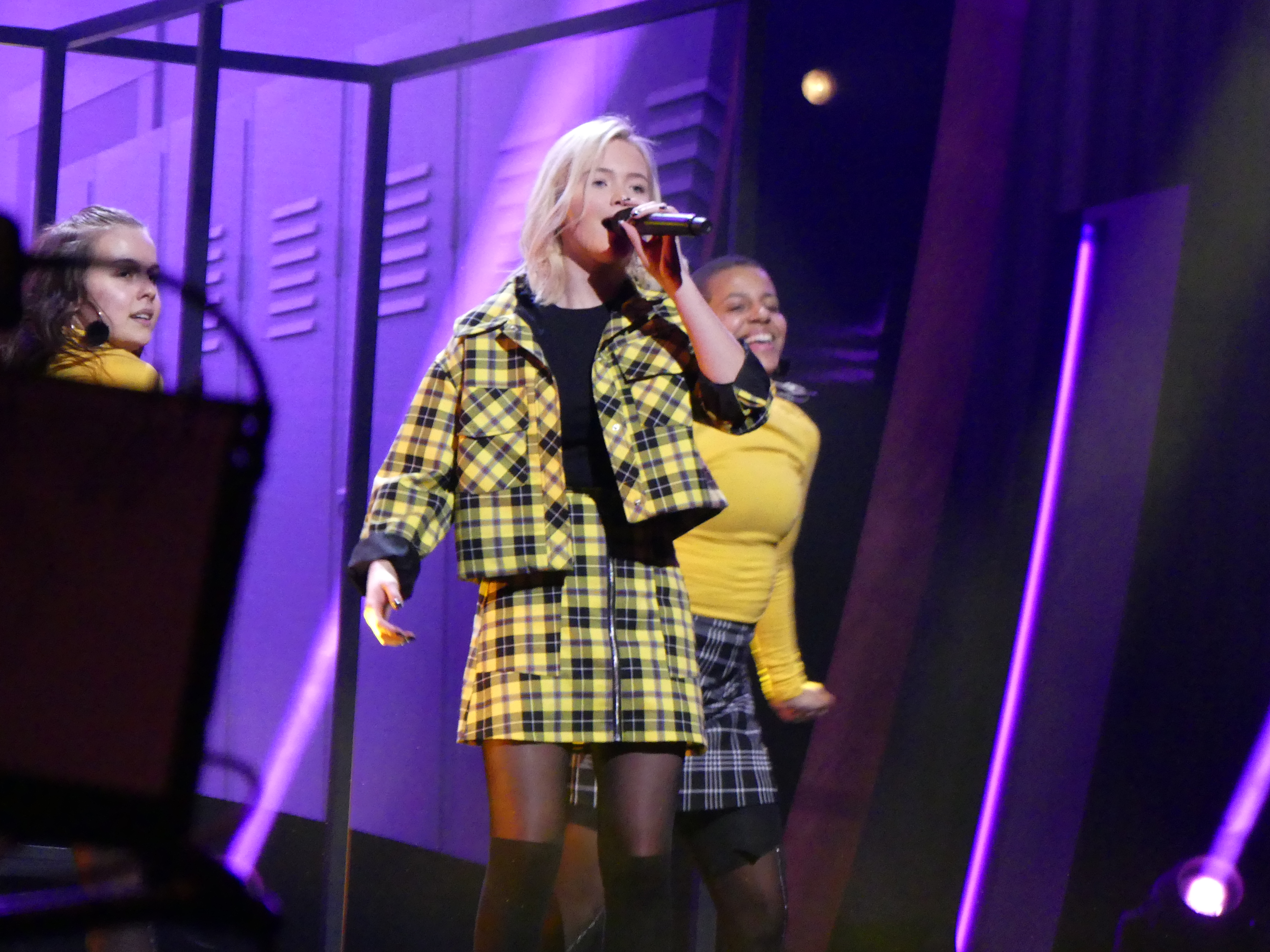
Malou Prytz - "I Do Me"

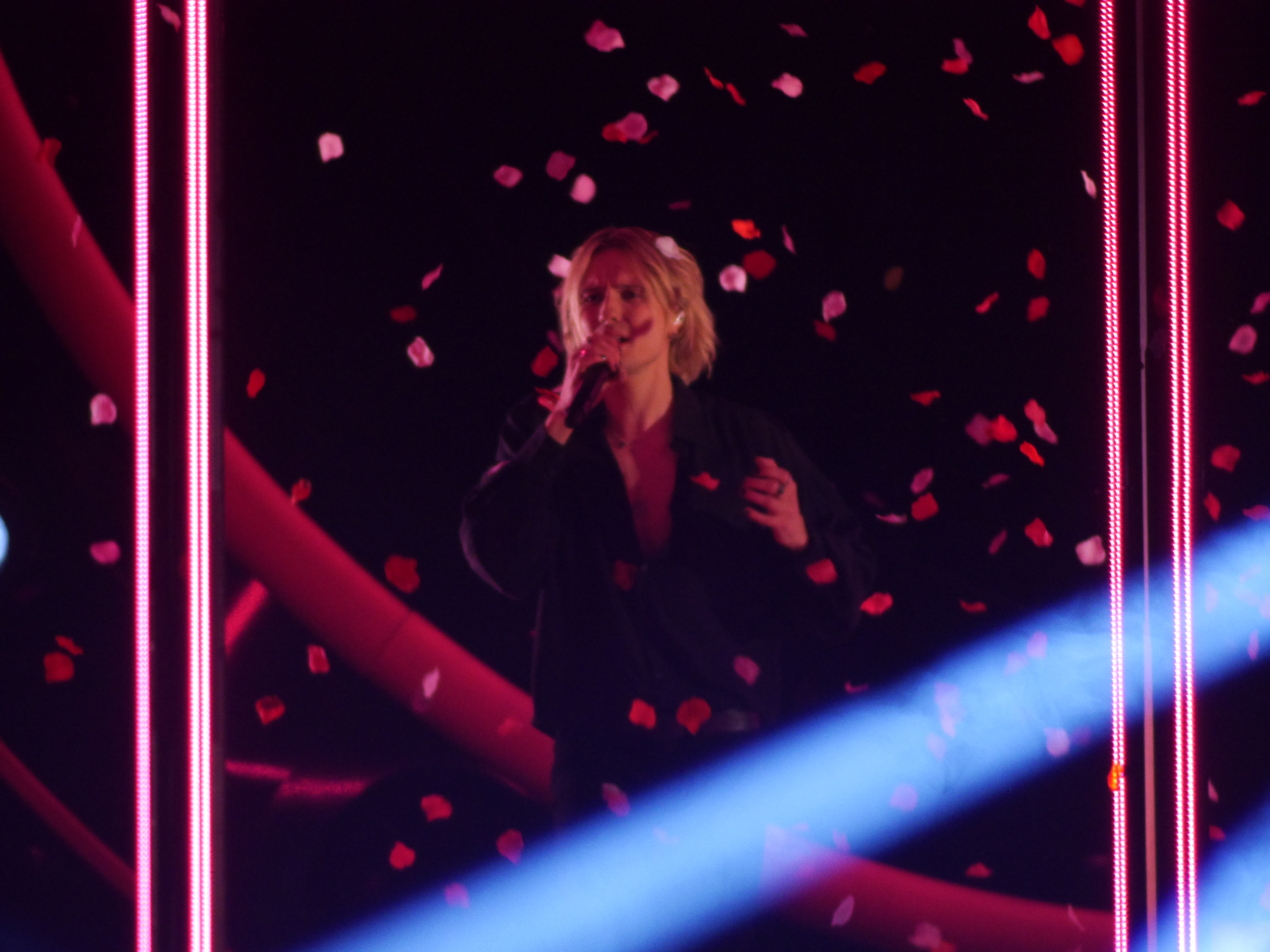
Oscar Enestad - "I Love It"

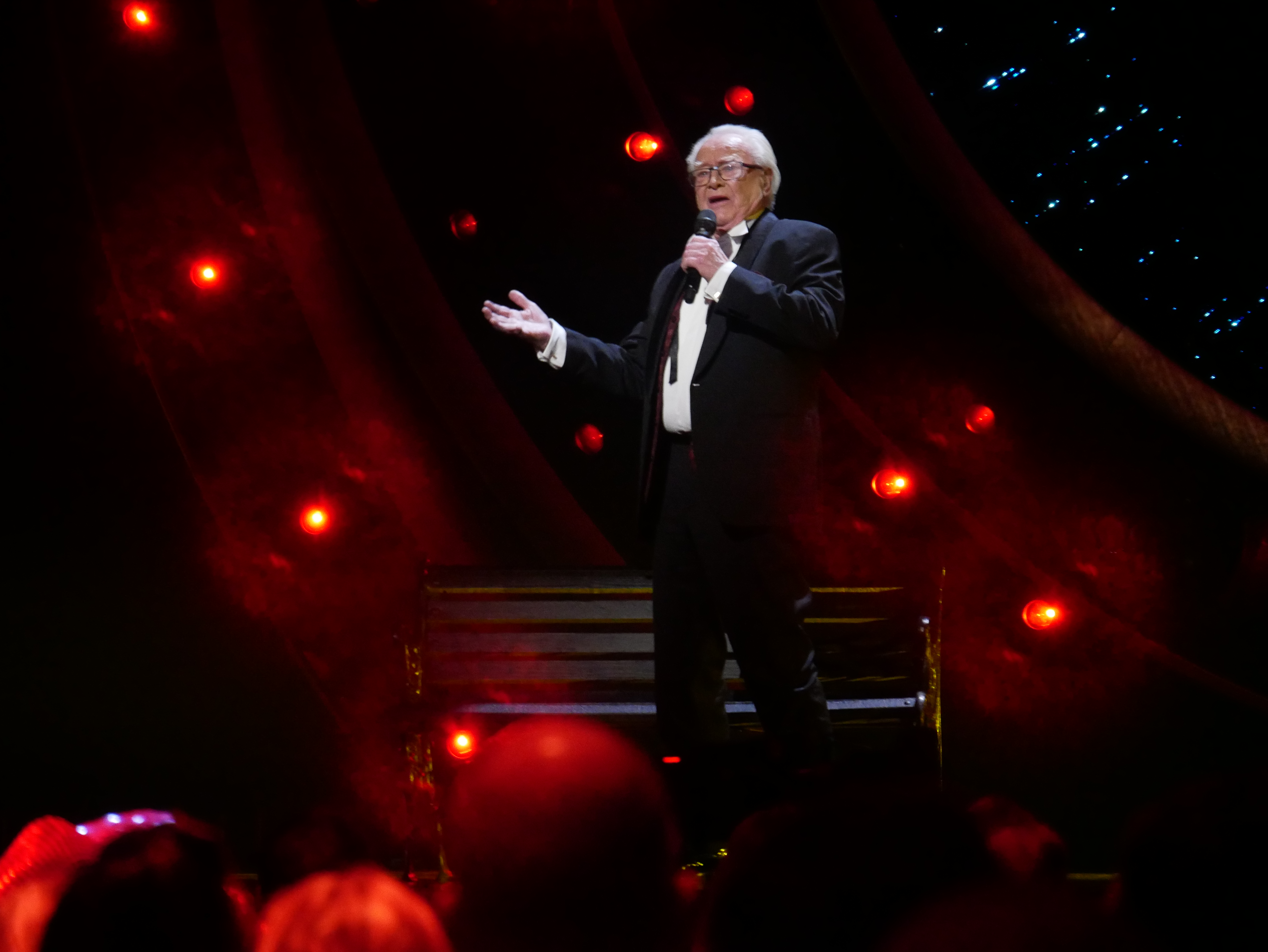
Jan Malmsjö - "Leva livet"

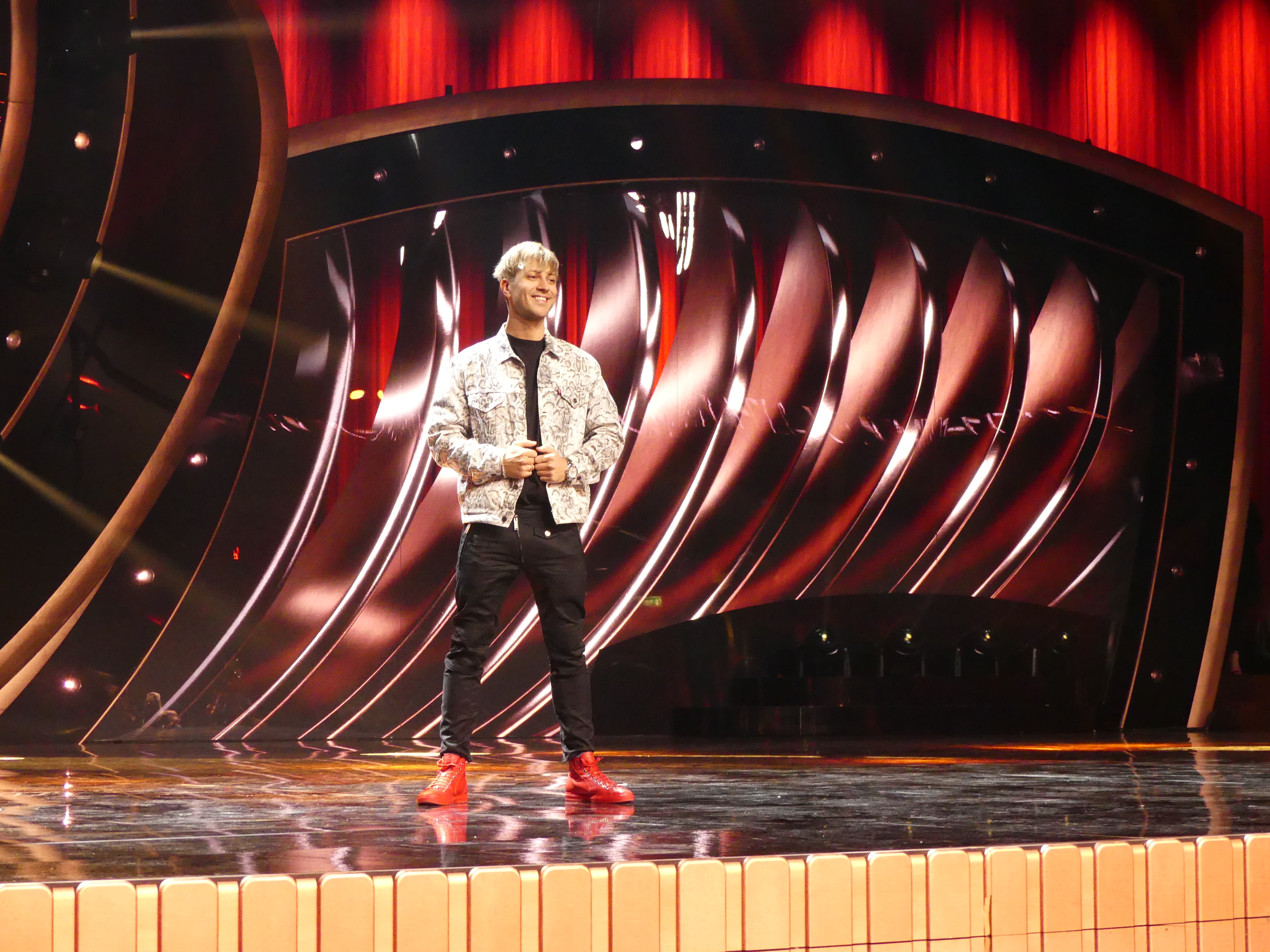
Vlad Reiser - "Nakna i regnet"

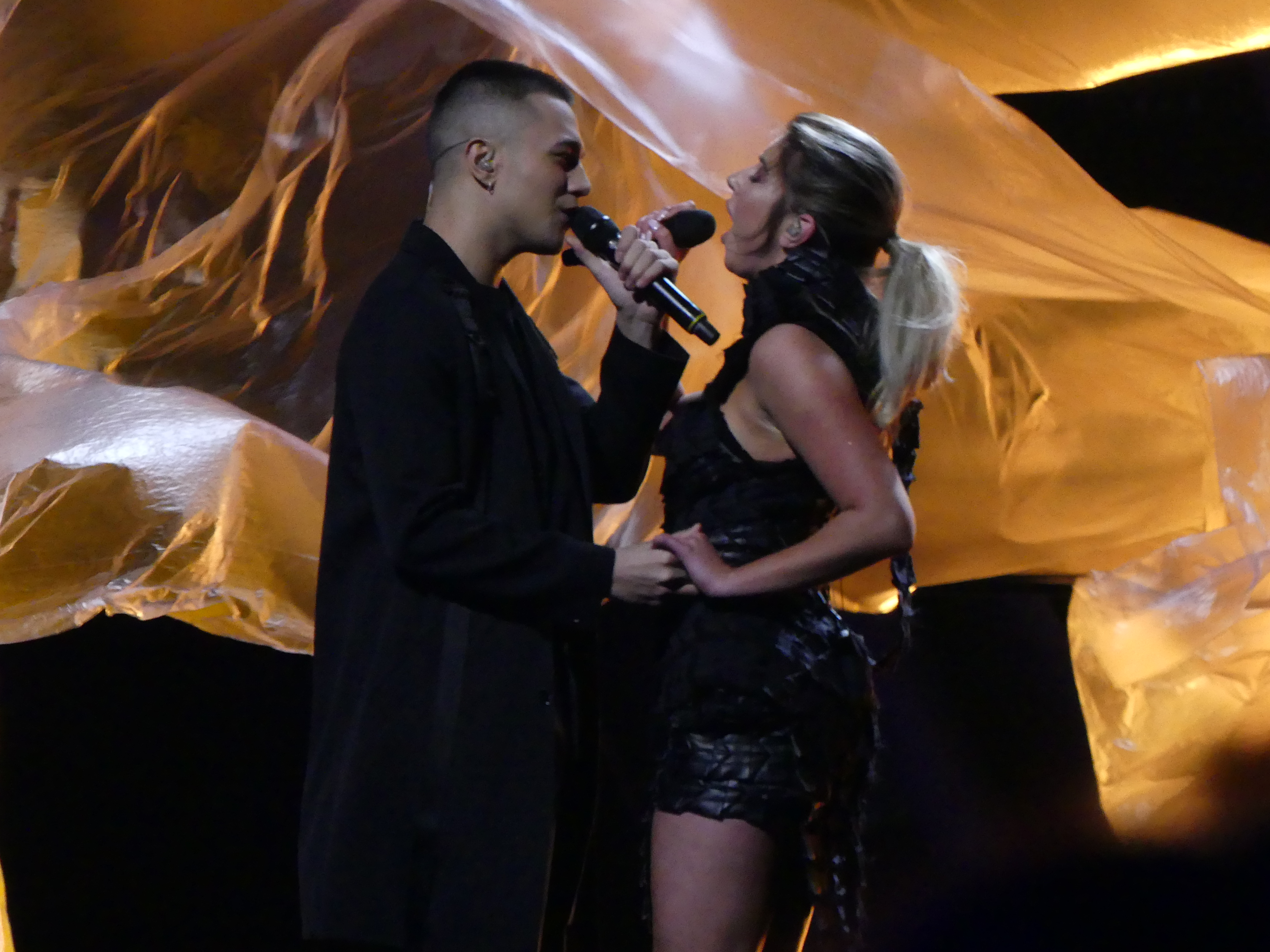
Hanna Ferm & LIAMOO - "Hold You"

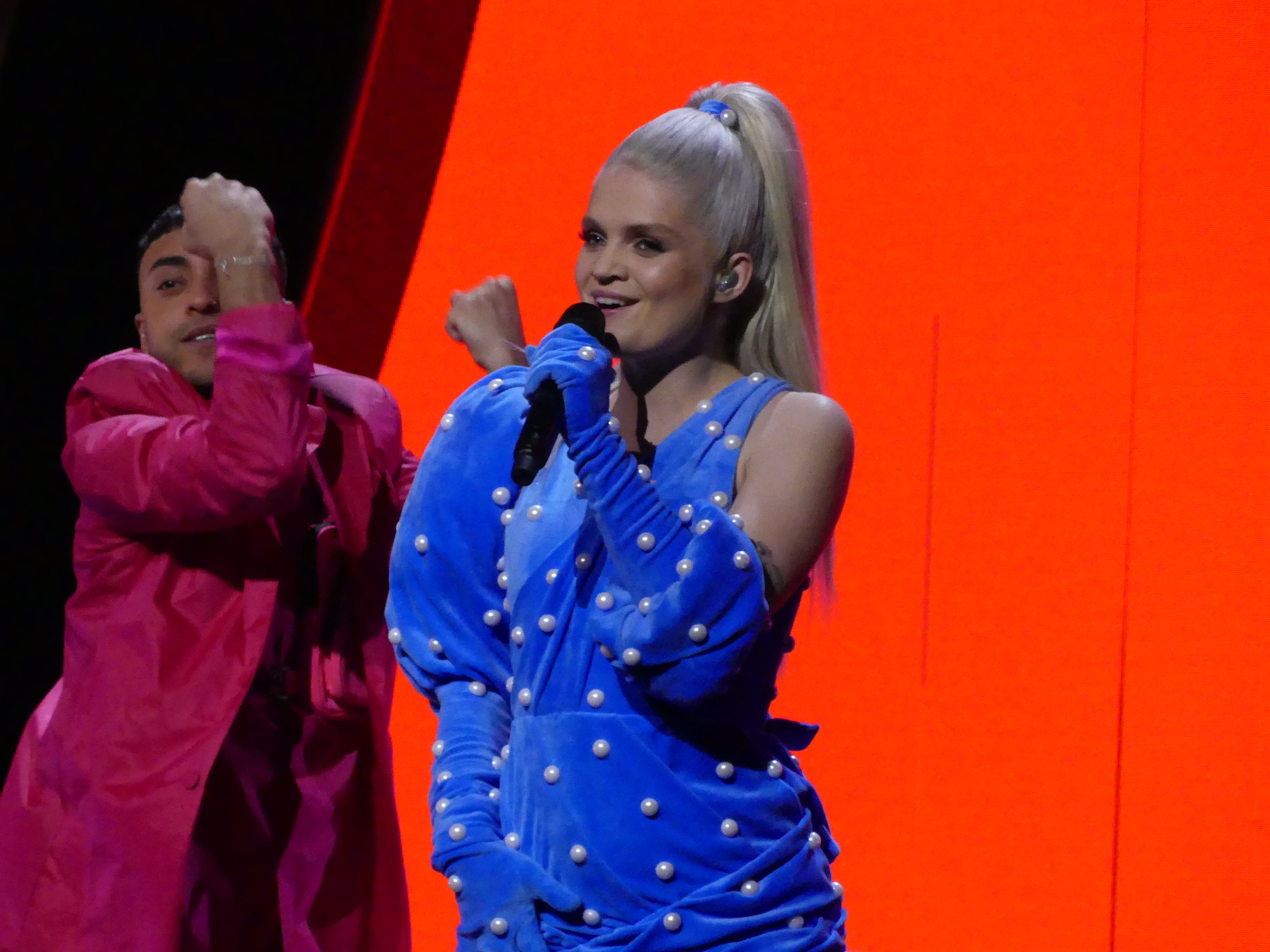
Margaret - "Tempo"

=== Heat 3 ===
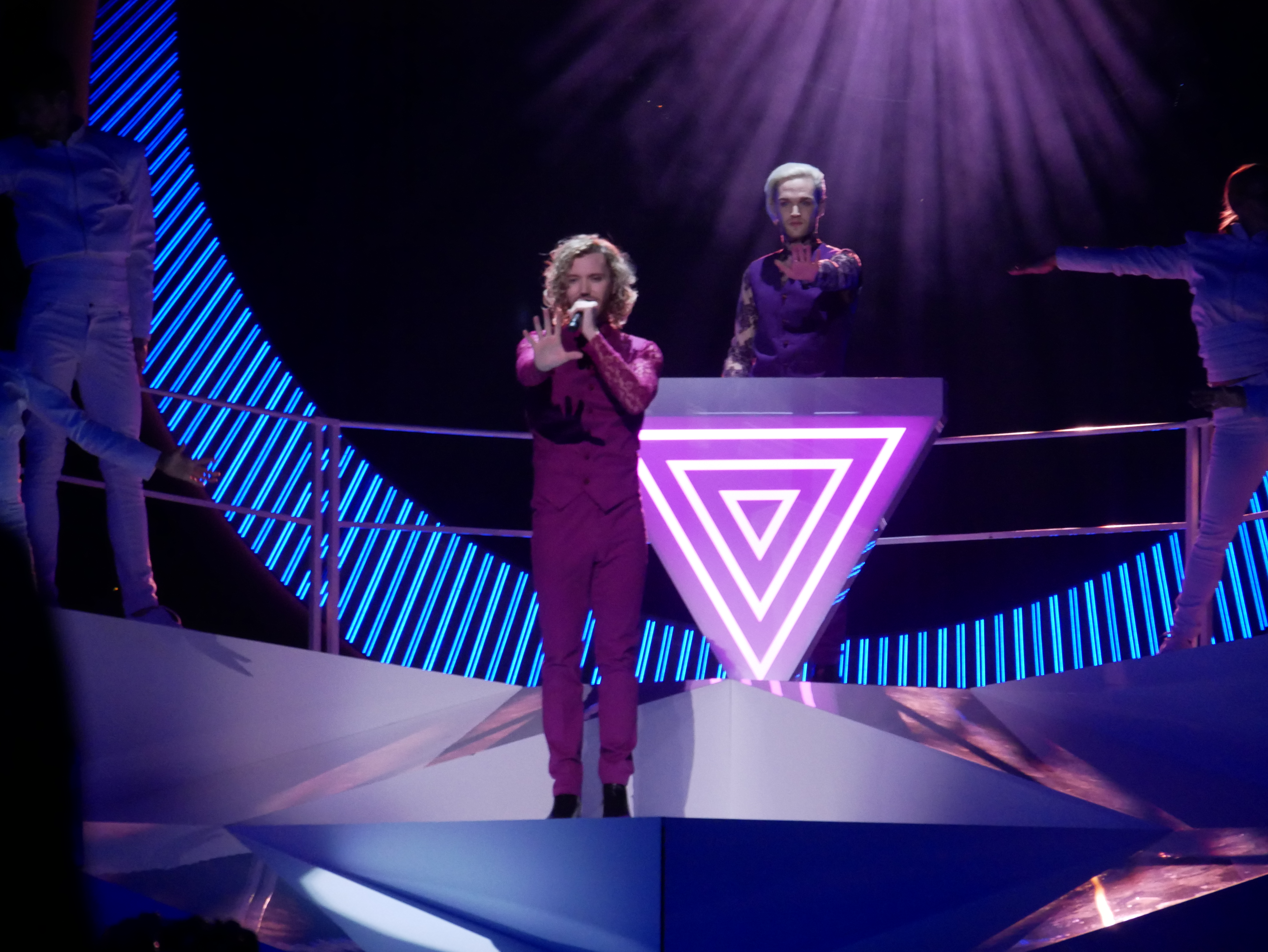
The Lovers of Valdaro - "Somebody Wants"

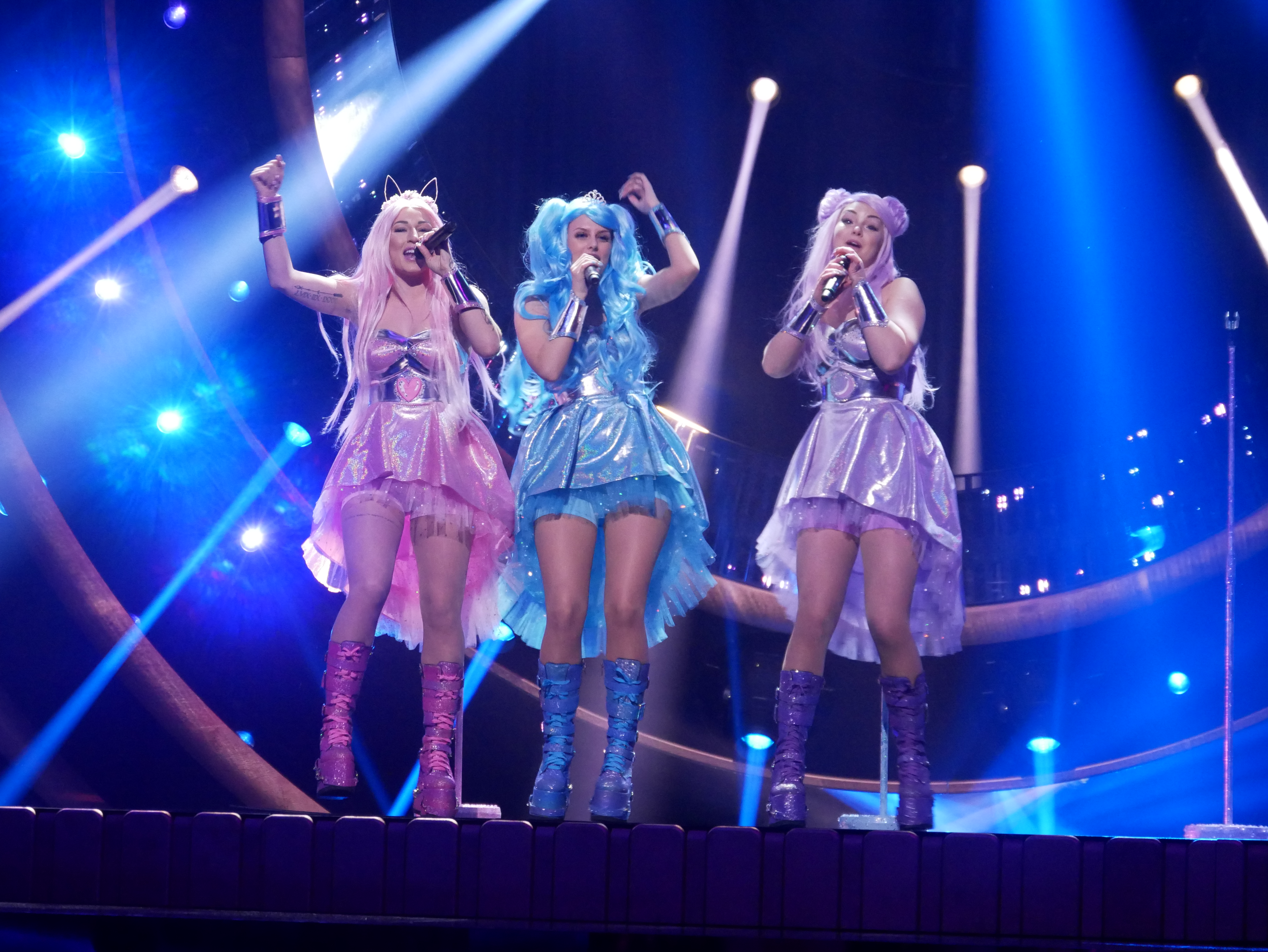
Dolly Style - "Habibi"

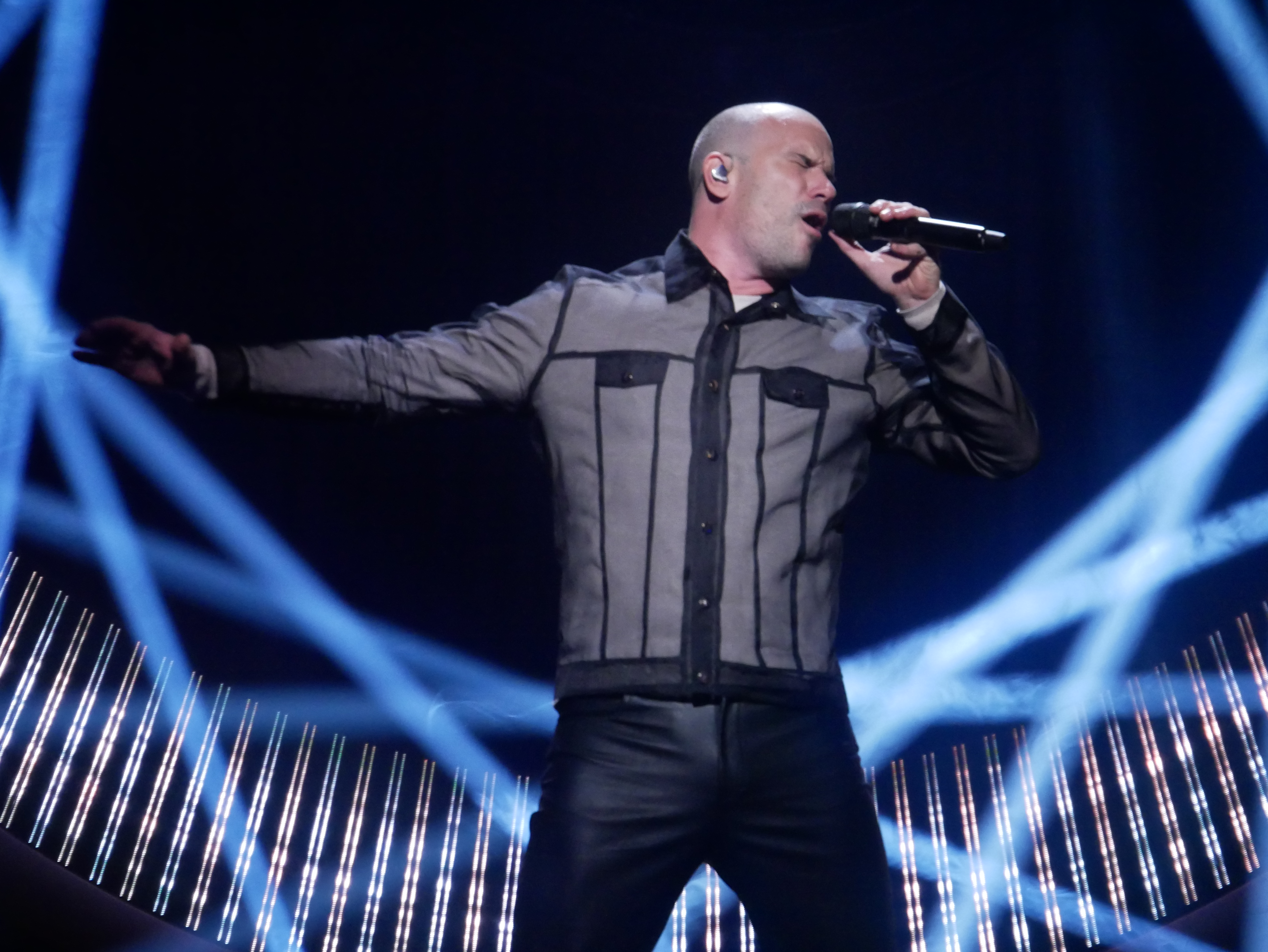
Martin Stenmarck - "Låt skiten brinna"

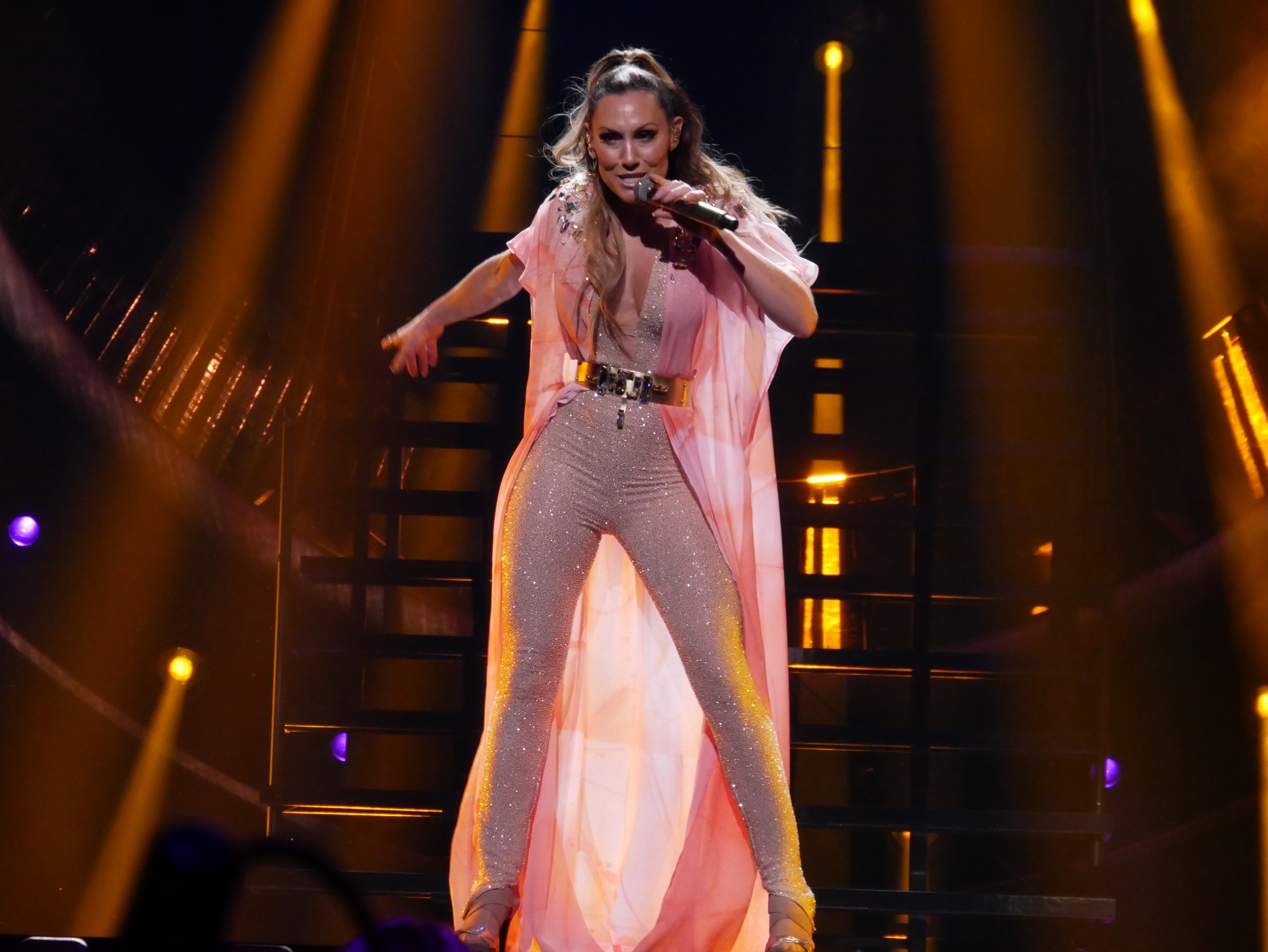
Lina Hedlund - "Victorious"

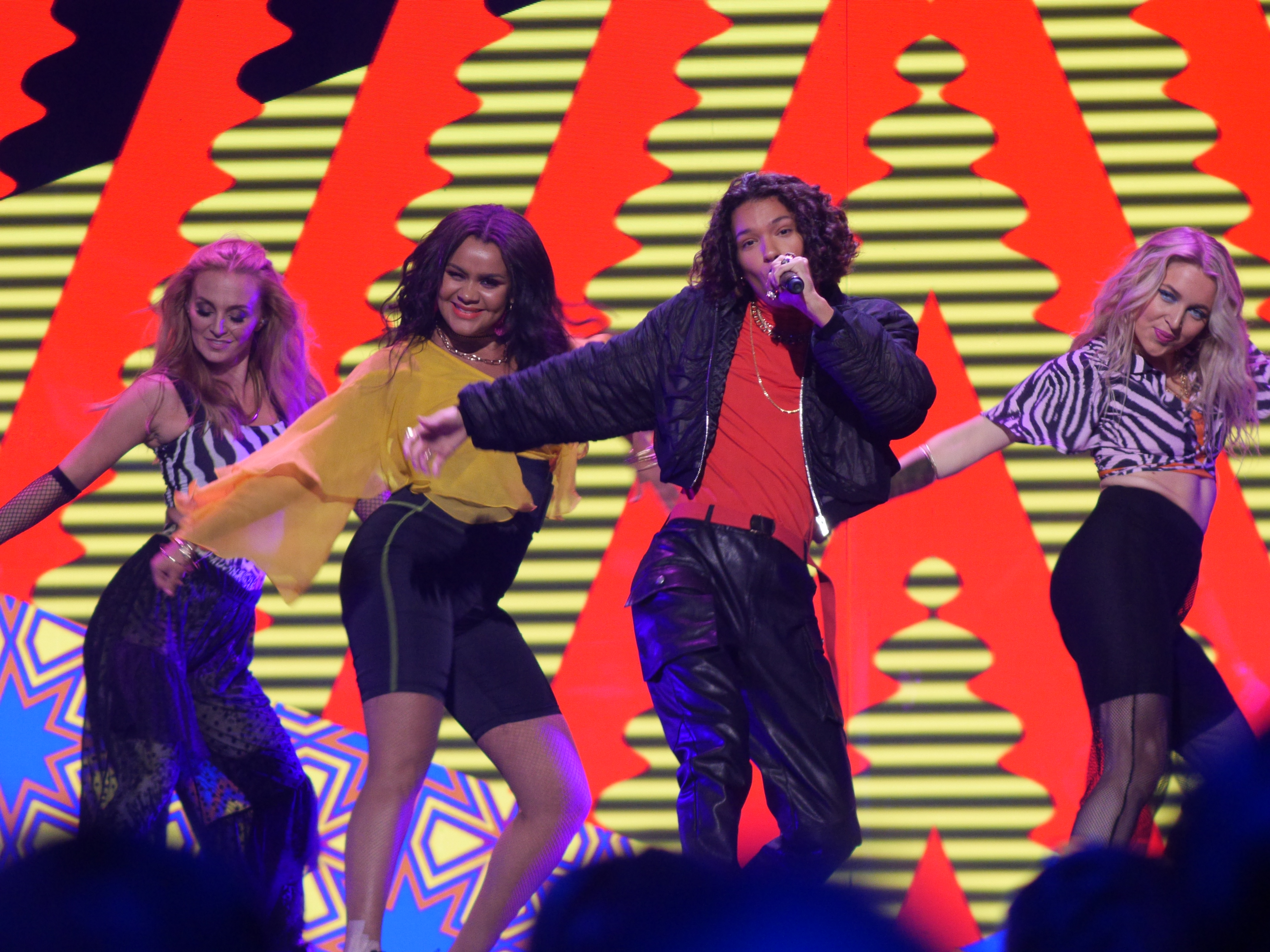
Omar Rundberg - "Om om och om igen"

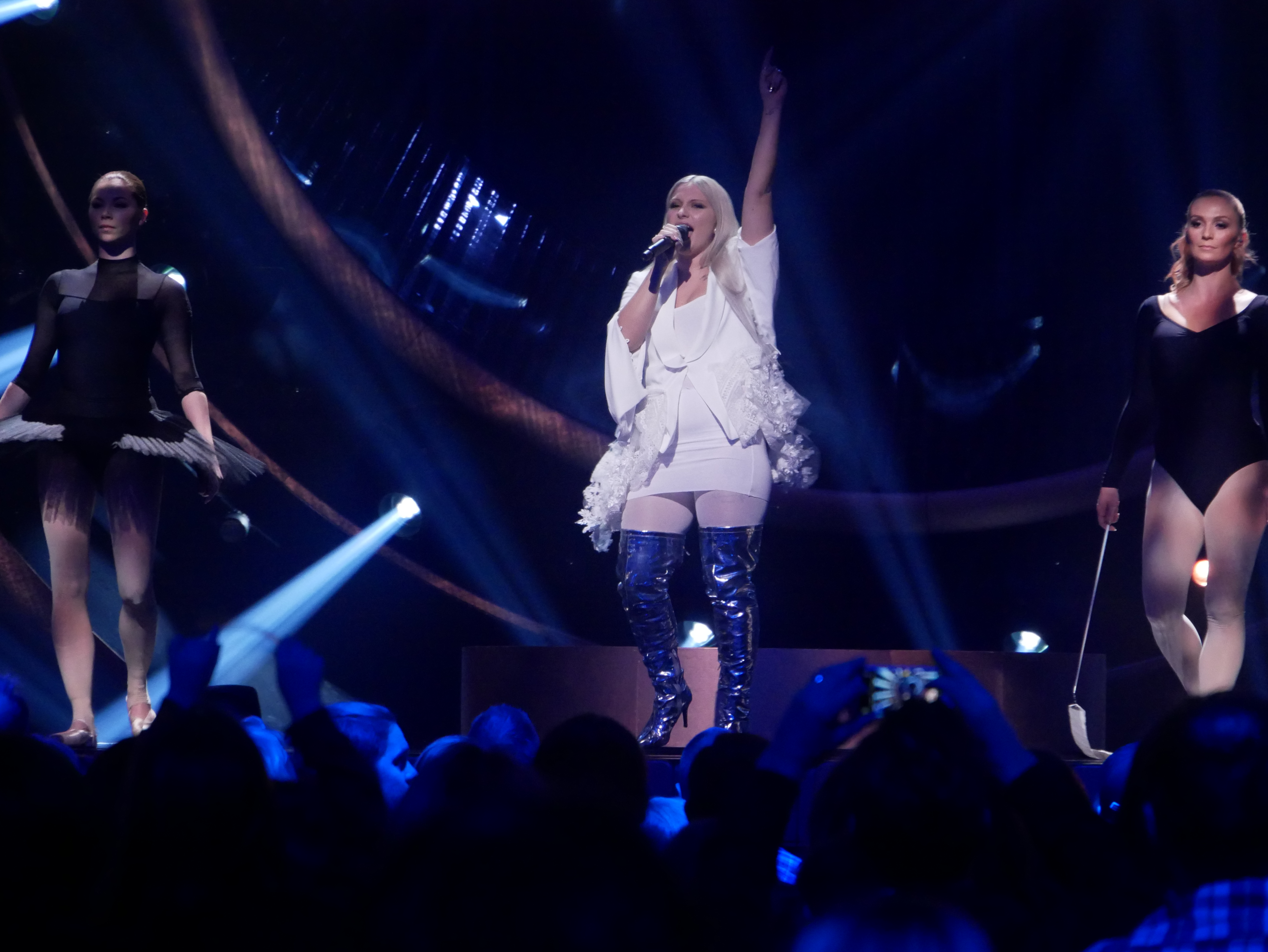
Rebecka Karlsson - "Who I Am"

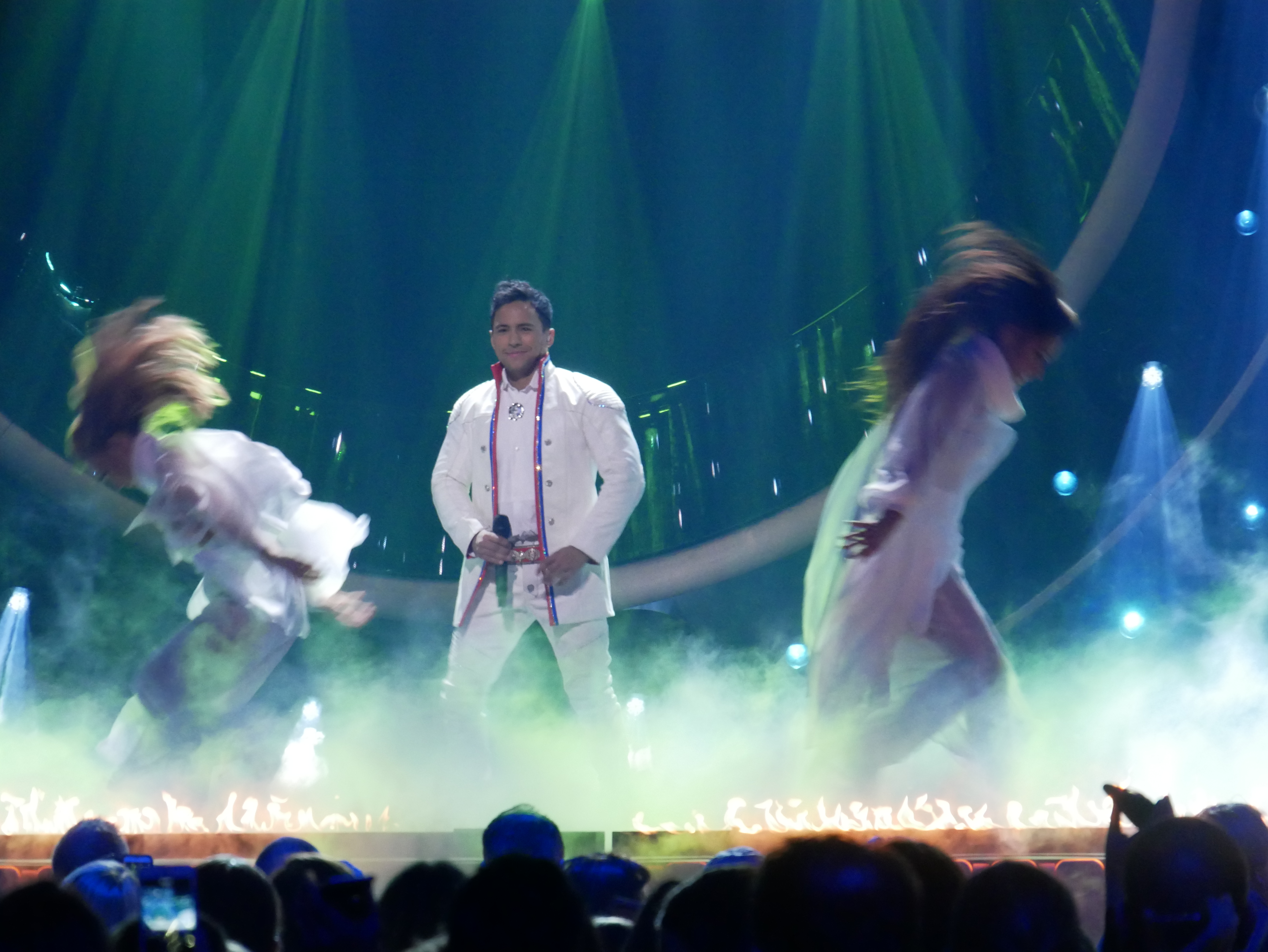
Jon Henrik Fjällgren - "Norrsken (Goeksegh)"

=== Heat 4 ===
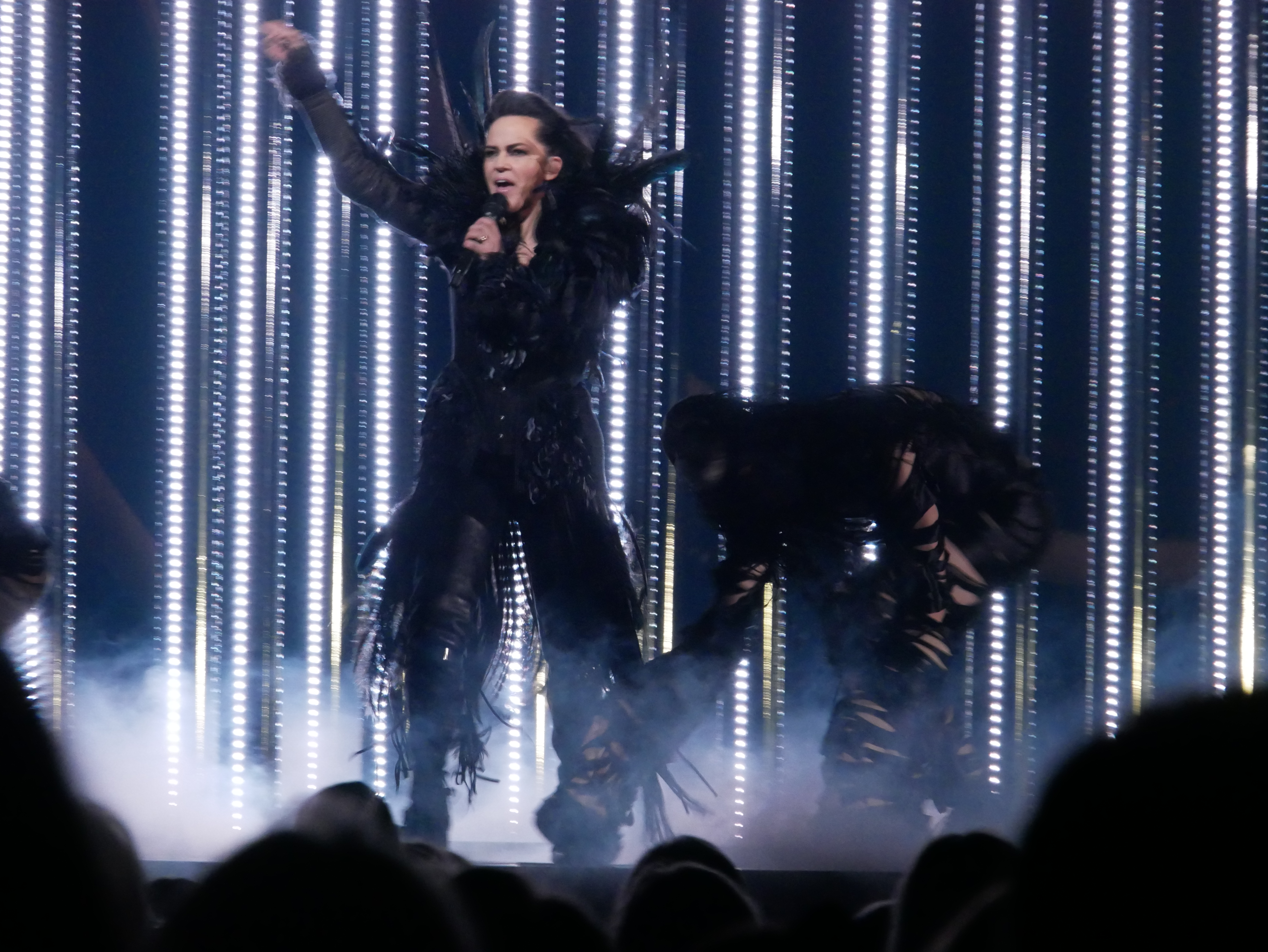
Pagan Fury - "Stormbringer"

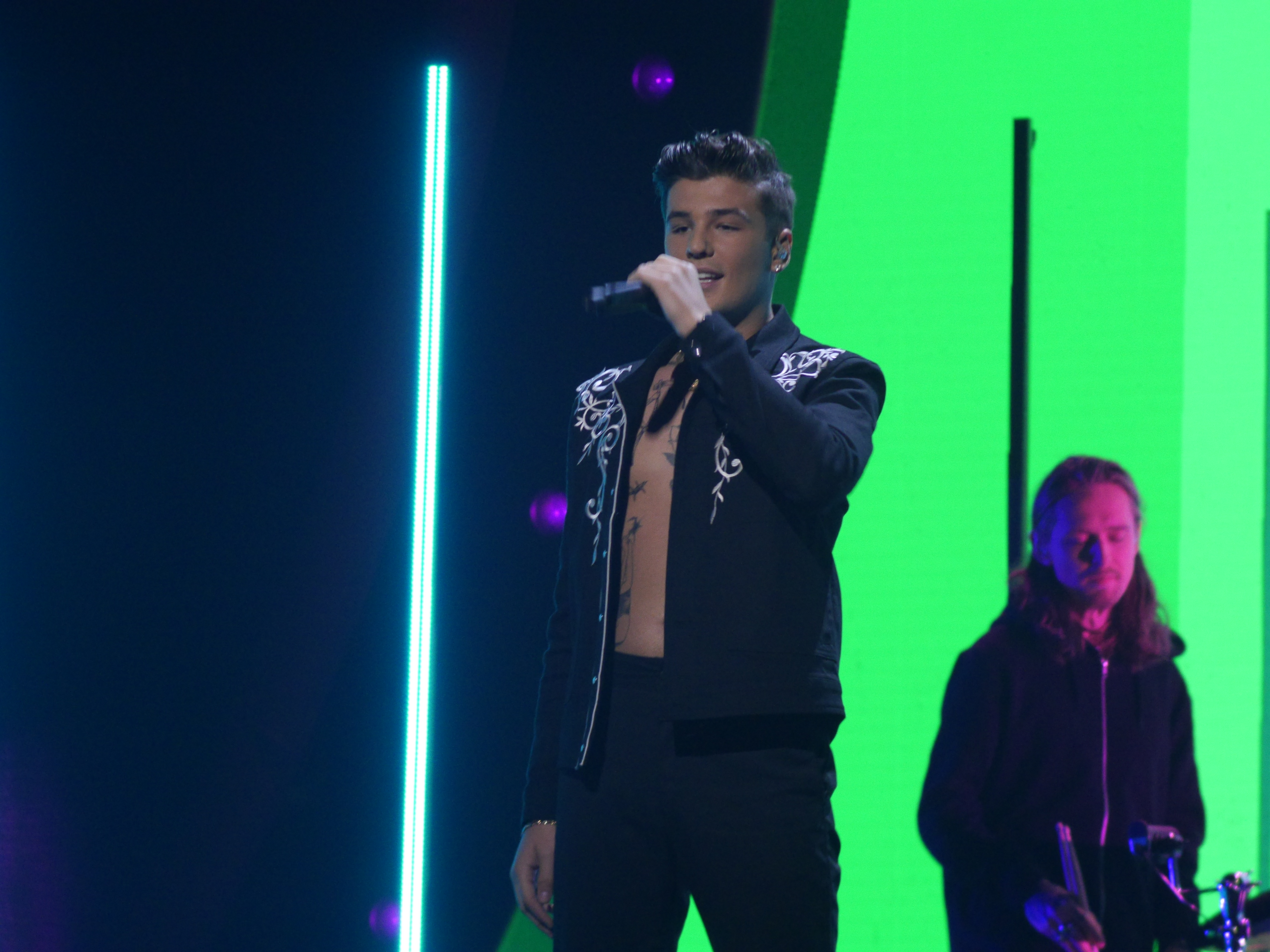
Anton Hagman - "Känner dig"

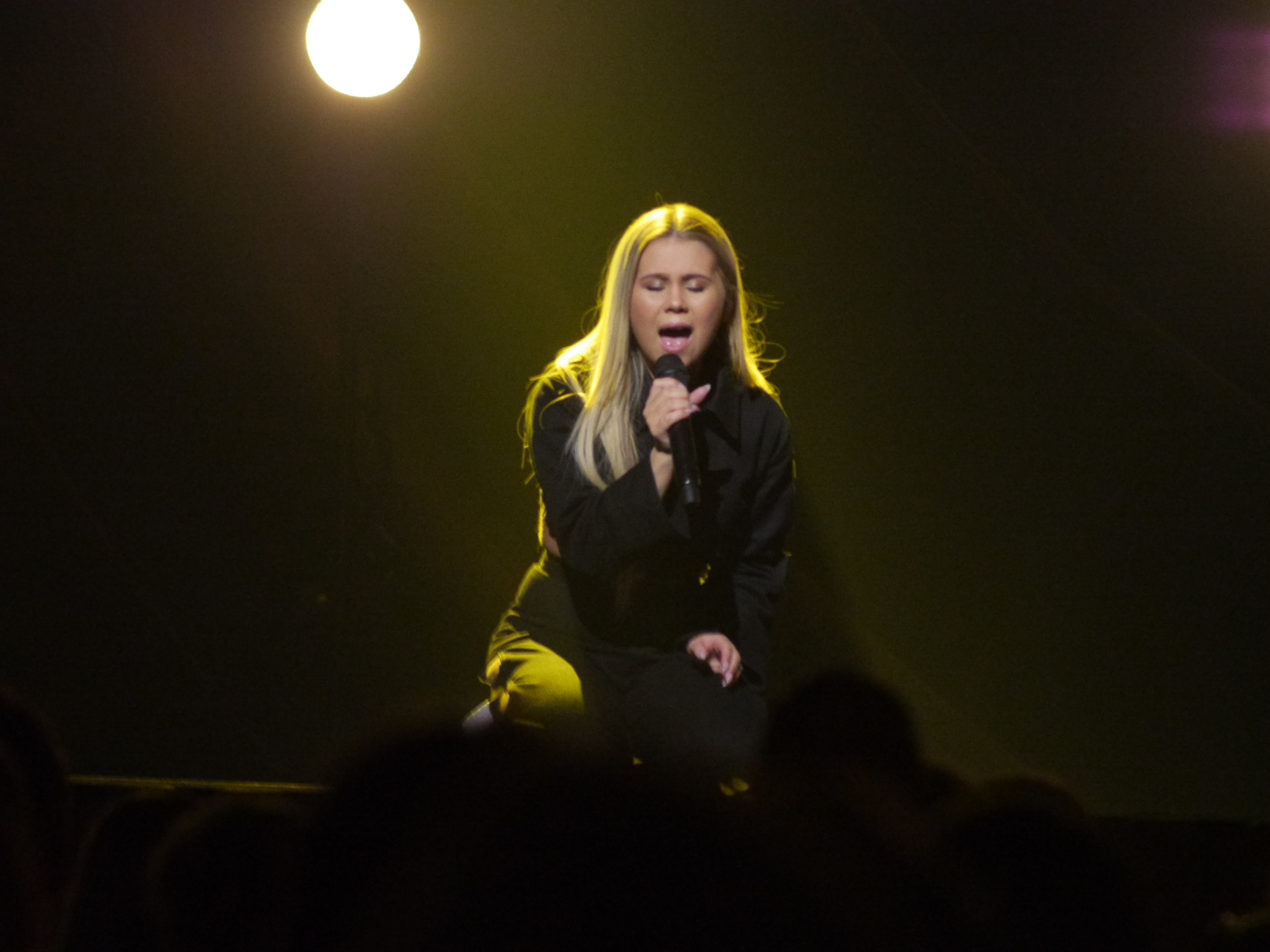
Lisa Ajax - "Torn"

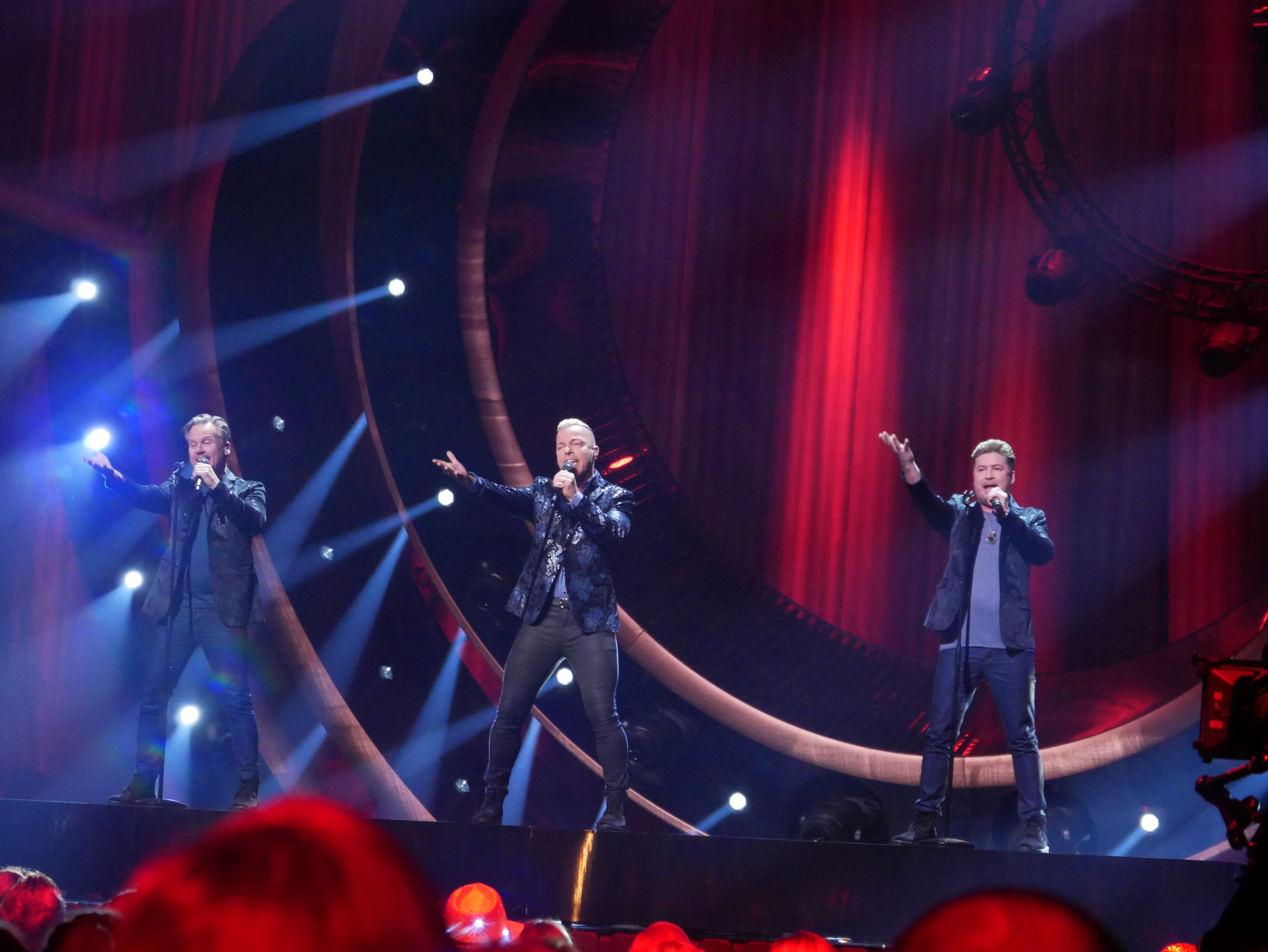
Arvingarna - "I Do"

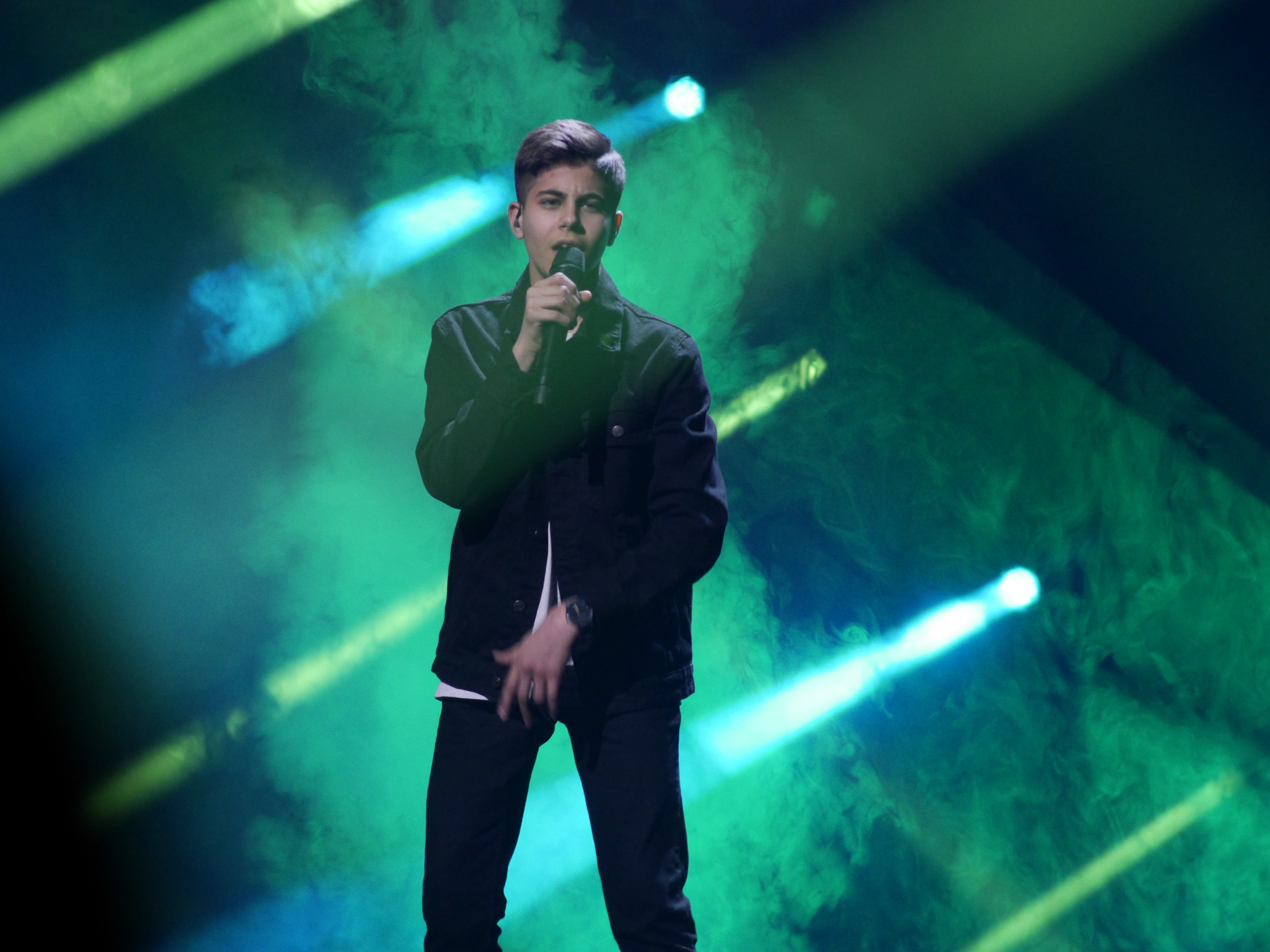
Bishara - "On My Own"

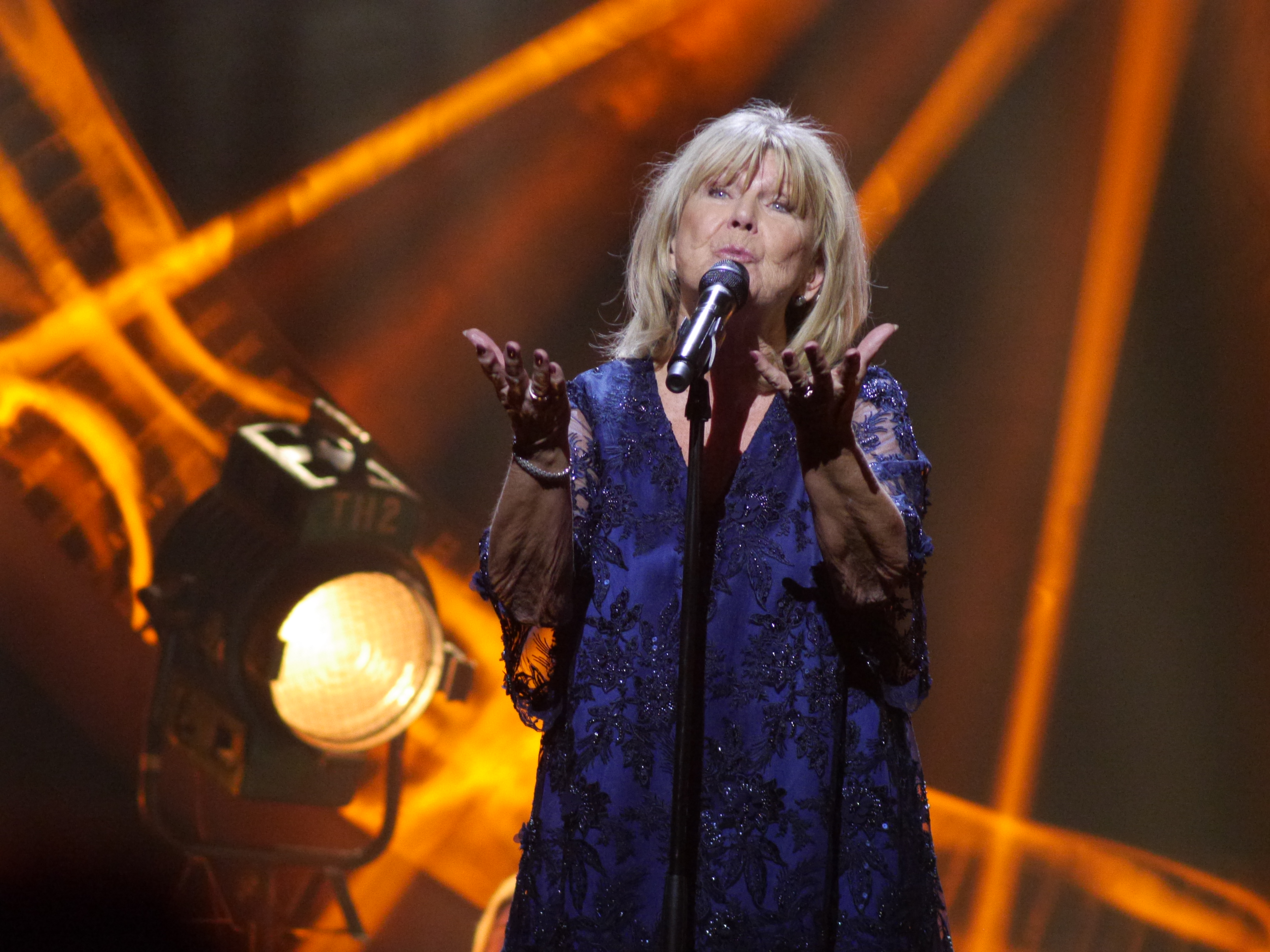
Ann-Louise Hansson - "Kärleken finns kvar"

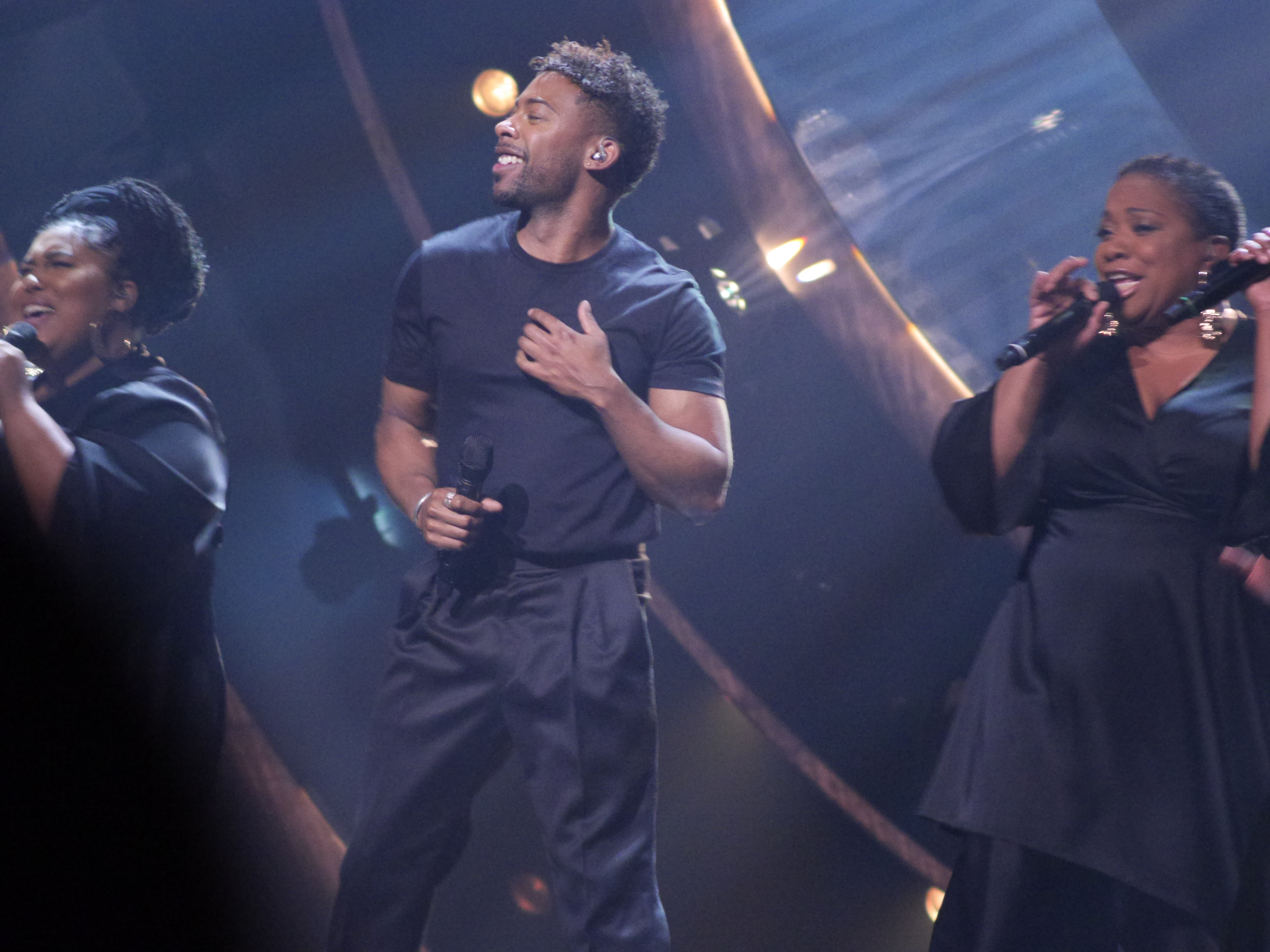
John Lundvik - "Too Late for Love"
