= Pagan Fury =

Swedish musical group

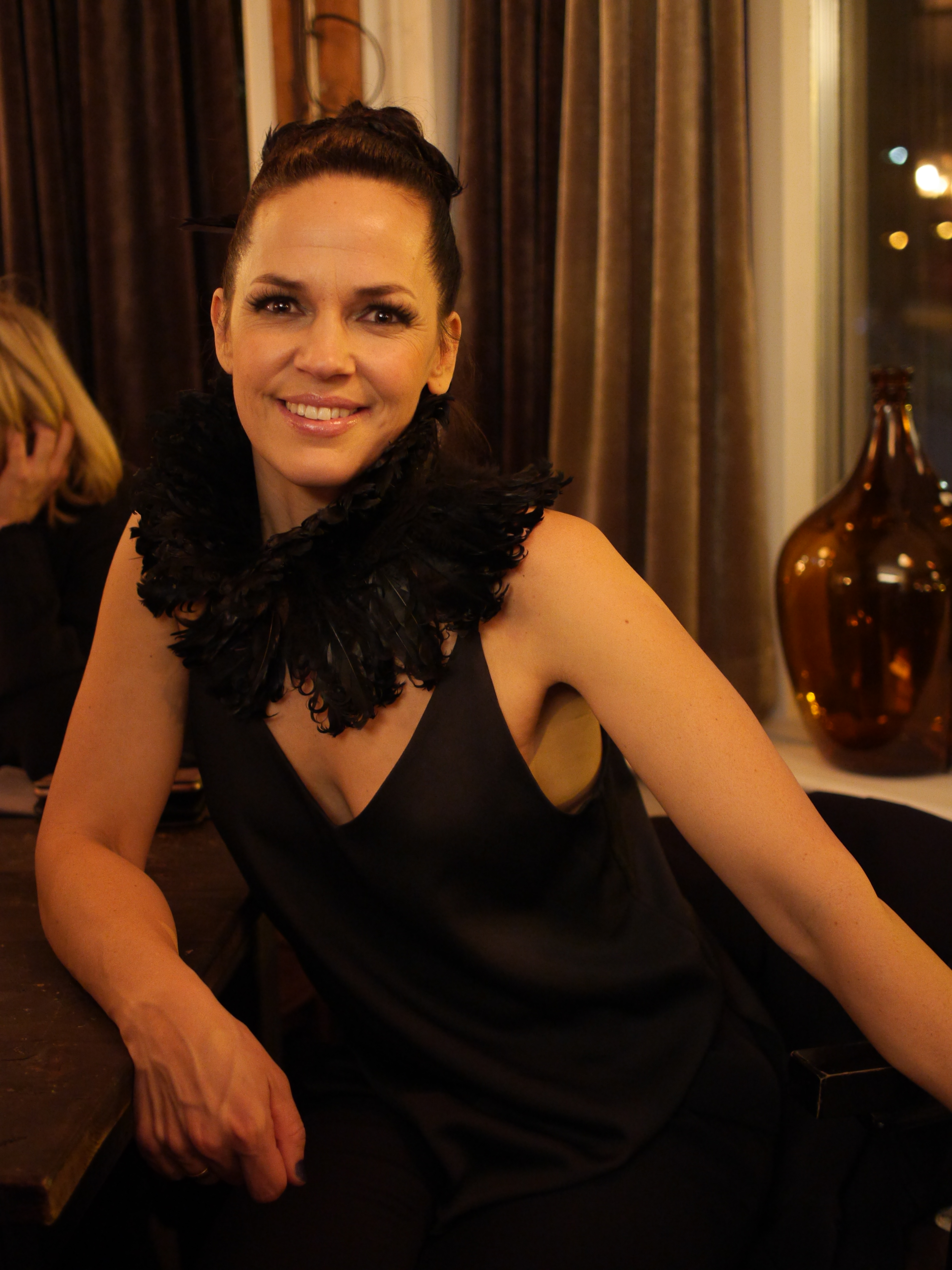
Lead singer of Pagan Fury at Melodifestivalen 2019

Pagan Fury is a Swedish folk metal music group. The group released their first music single Until the Day We Die in 2018. Pagan Fury participated in Melodifestivalen 2019 with the song "Stormbringer" and they placed seventh in the semifinal.

== Discography ==
Title	Year	Peak chart positions	Album
Title	Year	SWE Heat.	Album
"Stormbringer"	2019	1	Non-album single
