= Not with Me =

Single by Wiktoria
- Released: February 23, 2019
- Label: Moon Man
- Songwriter(s): Linnea Deb; Joy Deb; Wiktoria Johansson

Wiktoria singles chronology
"I Told Santa" (2018)	"Not with Me" (2019)	"OMG" (2019)

"Not with Me" is a song by Swedish singer Wiktoria. The song was performed for the first time in Melodifestivalen 2019, where it made it to the final. This was her third entry in Melodifestivalen and the first since "As I Lay Me Down" 2017.

== Charts ==
Chart (2019)	Peak position
Sweden (Sverigetopplistan)	5
