= The Lovers of Valdaro (duo) =

Swedish music duo

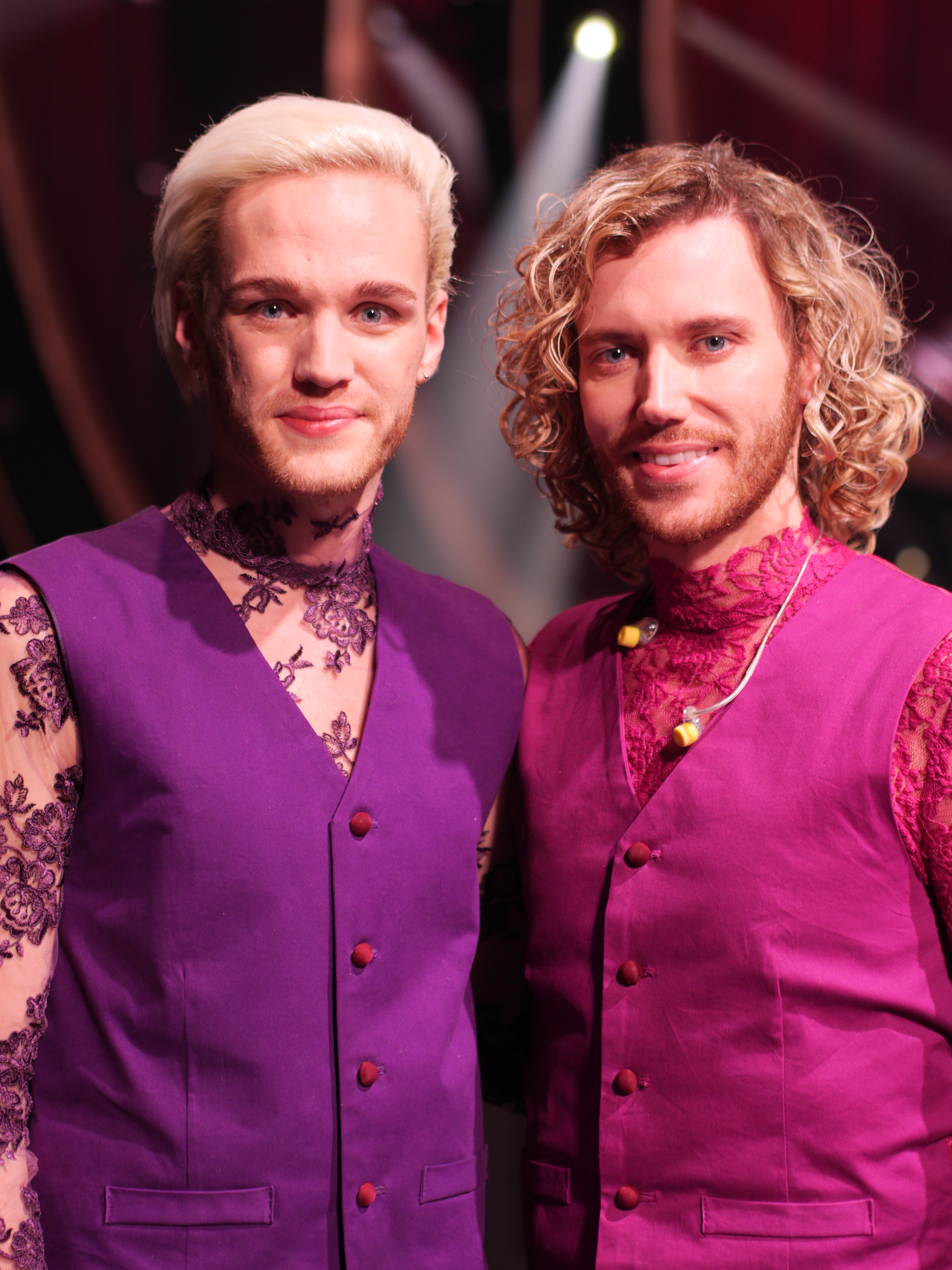

Background information
- Origin: Stockholm, Sweden
- Genres: Dance, Pop, electronic
- Years active: 2018–present
- Labels: Roxy Recordings; Egmont Group; Cold School
- Members: Adam Warhester; Erik Gabriel

The Lovers of Valdaro are a Swedish musical duo consisting of vocalist Erik Gabriel and producer Adam Warhester. They participated in Melodifestivalen 2019 with the song "Somebody Wants" and got the 7th place in the third semi-final.

Erik Gabriel was one of the three lookalike backing singers of the Moldovan entry in the Eurovision Song Contest 2018.

== Discography ==
=== EPs ===
- Euphoric Melancholic Electronic (2018)

=== Singles ===
Title	Year	Peak chart positions	Album
Title	Year	SWE	Album
"Lost Forever"	2018	—	Non-album single
"Somebody Wants"	2019	— (Note: "Somebody Wants" did not chart on the Sverigetopplistan, but peaked at number three on the Swedish Heatseeker chart.)	Non-album single
"Faster to Nowhere"	2019	—	Non-album single
"Rhythm & Decibel"	2020	—	Non-album single
"Eternal Embrace"	2020	—	Non-album single
