= Rebecka Karlsson =

Swedish singer (born 2000)

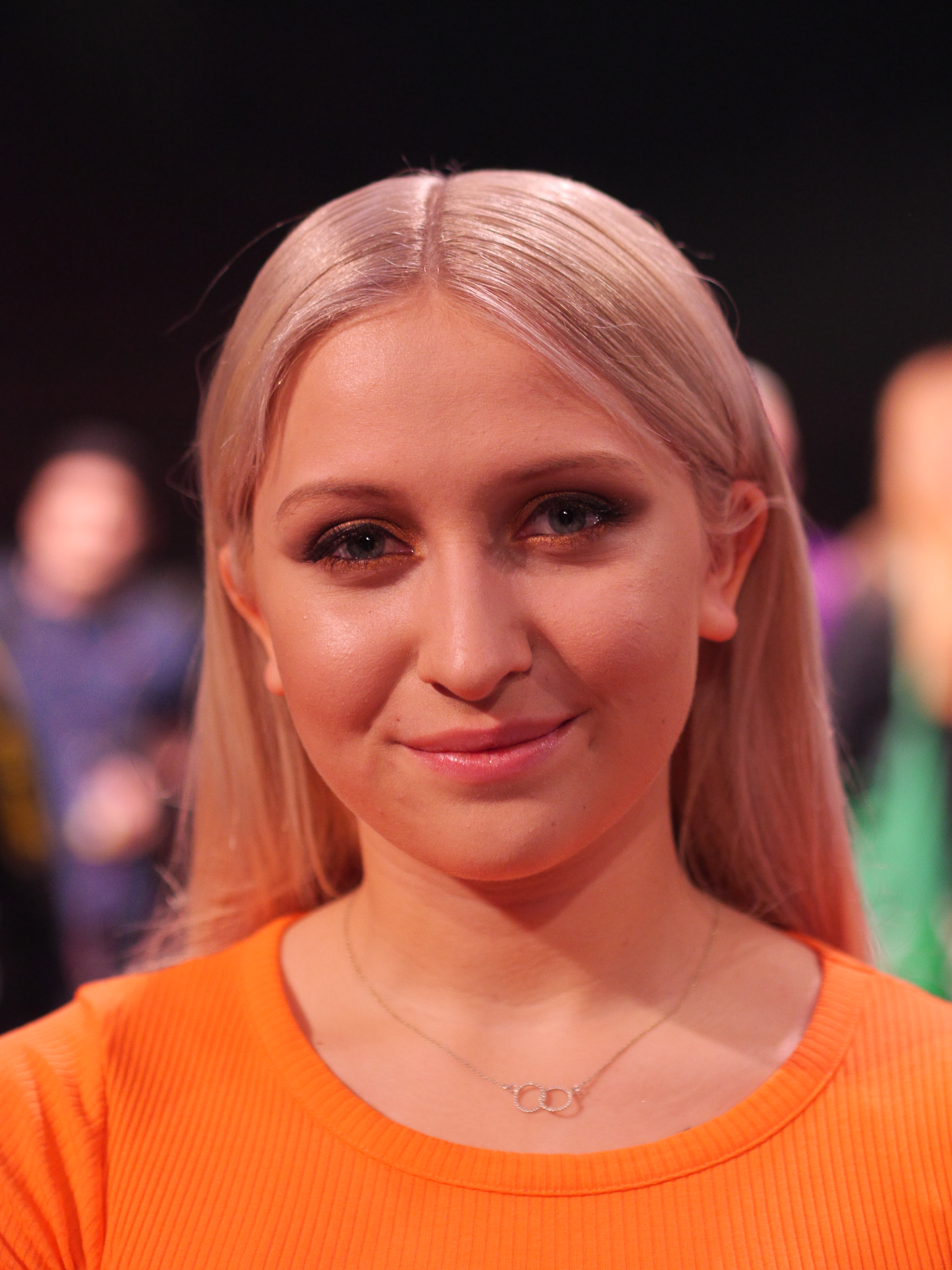
Rebecka Karlsson (2019)

Ida Rebecka Eloise Karlsson (born 12 June 2000) is a Swedish singer. At the age of eight she participated in Talang 2009 which is broadcast on TV4. She again participated on the show in Talang 2014 which was broadcast on TV3, making it to the semifinal. In 2014, she signed with Popopjone Records and released the music single "Ghost Flower", which also became the official song for the LGBT-festival Pride Ung in Stockholm. Karlsson participated as a contestant on Idol 2016, ending up in second place during the 8 December final in Globen. She competed in Melodifestivalen 2019 with the song "Who I Am" and made it to the Second Chance Round.

== Discography ==
Title	Year	Peak chart positions	Album
Title	Year	SWE	Album
"Can't Stop"	2017	—	Non-album singles
"Who I Am"	2019	40	Non-album singles
