= Norrsken (Goeksegh) =

Single by Jon Henrik Fjällgren
- Released: February 23, 2019
- Genre: Pop
- Label: Warner Music Sweden
- Songwriters: Fredrik Kempe; David Kreuger; Niklas Carson Mattsson; Jon Henrik Fjällgren

"Norrsken (Goeksegh)" is a song by Swedish singer Jon Henrik Fjällgren. The song was performed for the first time in Melodifestivalen 2019, where it made it to the final. This was his third entry in the Melodifestivalen.

== Charts ==
Chart (2019)	Peak position
Sweden (Sverigetopplistan)	7
