= Hello (Mohombi song) =

Single by Mohombi
- Released: February 23, 2019
- Label: Powerhouse
- Songwriter(s): Alexandru Florin Cotoi; Thomas G:son; Mohombi; Linnea Deb

Mohombi singles chronology
"Claro Que Sí" (2019)	"Hello" (2019)	"Winners" (2020)

Music video
- "Hello" on YouTube

"Hello" is a song by Swedish-Congolese singer Mohombi and Youssou Ndour. The song was performed for the first time in Melodifestivalen 2019, where it made it to the final, finishing in fifth place. It features on the album 'History.'

== Charts ==
=== Weekly charts ===
Weekly chart performance for "Hello"
Chart (2019)	Peak position
Romania (Airplay 100)	70
Russia Airplay (TopHit)	6
Sweden (Sverigetopplistan)	3

=== Year-end charts ===
Year-end chart performance for "Hello"
Chart (2019)	Position
Sweden (Sverigetopplistan)	57

== Certifications ==
Certifications for "Hello"
Region	Certification	Certified units/sales
Sweden (GLF)	2× Platinum	16,000,000^{†}
^{†} Streaming-only figures based on certification alone.
