= High15 =

Swedish girl group

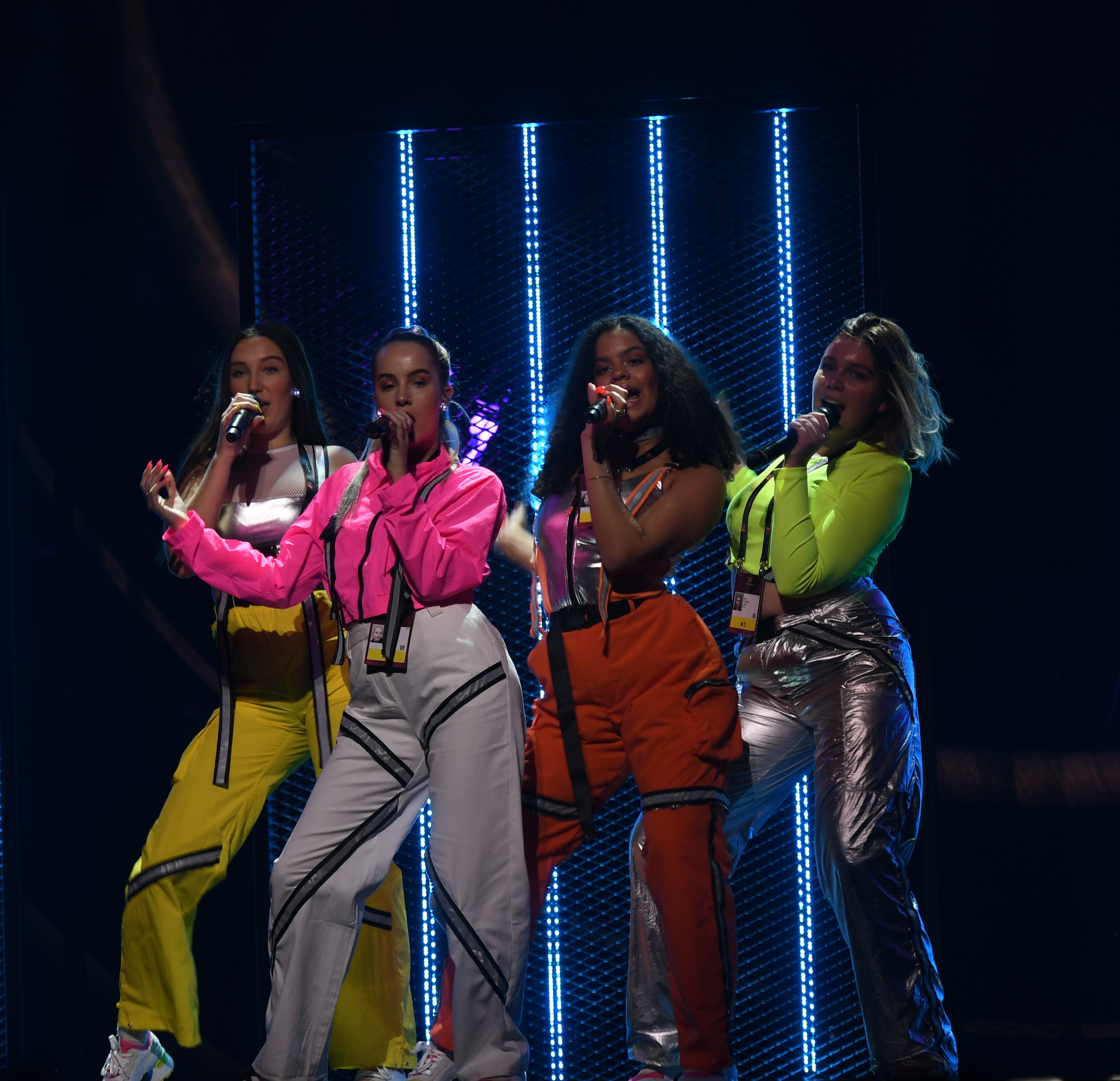
High15

High15 was a Swedish girl group.

== Career ==
They met at a Stage Academy camp, a musical education to which they had all applied at the age of 12. They first started receiving attention for their covers, which they published on YouTube. They participated in Talang 2017 which was broadcast on TV4 in Sweden, where they made it to the semifinals.

On 13 April 2018, the band released the single "Adios".

=== Melodifestivalen 2019 ===
In 2019, they participated in Melodifestivalen 2019 with the song "No Drama". They performed the song in the first semifinal in Gothenburg on 2 February 2019, where they finished in 6th place. On 4 February 2019, "No Drama" entered the Spotify 200 chart at 46.

== Members ==
The group consisted of members Amie Parfitt, Lleucu Young, Alva Lindgren and Tiana Salmon. When they met, none of them lived in the same area. Parfitt comes from Lilla Beddinge in Skåne, Salmon from Stockholm, Lindgren from Sundsvall and Young from Hanko, Finland.

== Discography ==
Title	Year	Peak chart positions	Album
Title	Year	SWE	Album
"No Drama"	2019	91	Non-album single
