= Victorious (Lina Hedlund song) =

Single by Lina Hedlund
- Released: February 23, 2019
- Genre: Pop
- Label: Universal Music
- Songwriter(s): Johanna Jansson; Richard Edwards; Dino Medanhodzic; Melanie Wehbe
- Producer(s): Richard Edwards; Dino Medanhodzic

"Victorious" is a song by Swedish singer Lina Hedlund. The song was performed for the first time in Melodifestivalen 2019, where it made it to the final. This was Hedlund's first Melodifestivalen solo entry since 2003 with "Nothing Can Stop Me".

== Charts ==
Chart (2019)	Peak position
Sweden (Sverigetopplistan)	28
