= Hold You (Hanna Ferm and Liamoo song) =

Single by Hanna Ferm and Liamoo
- Released: 23 February 2019
- Label: Universal Music
- Songwriter(s): Anton Hård af Segerstad; Jimmy Jansson; Hanna Ferm; Fredrik Sonefors; Liam Cacatian Thomassen
- Producer(s): Anton Hård af Segerstad

Hanna Ferm singles chronology
"Bad Habit" (2018)	"Hold You" (2019)	"Torn" (2019)

Liamoo singles chronology
"Forever Young" (2018)	"Hold You" (2019)

"Hold You" is a song by Swedish duo Hanna Ferm and Liamoo. The song was performed for the first time in Melodifestivalen 2019, where it made it to the final. This is Liamoo's second entry in Melodifestivalen, after his 2018 entry "Last Breath".

== Charts ==
=== Weekly charts ===
Chart (2019)	Peak position
Sweden (Sverigetopplistan)	2

=== Year-end charts ===
Chart (2019)	Position
Sweden (Sverigetopplistan)	60
