= Melodi Grand Prix 2018 =

Selection of Norway's entry to Eurovision

Date and venue
- Final: 10 March 2018
- Venue: Oslo Spektrum; Oslo, Norway

Organisation
- Broadcaster: Norsk rikskringkasting (NRK)

Participants
- Number of entries: 10

Vote
- Winning song: "That's How You Write a Song" by Alexander Rybak

Melodi Grand Prix 2018 was the 56th edition of Melodi Grand Prix, Norway's national selection for the Eurovision Song Contest. The competition was held on Saturday, 10 March 2018 in the Oslo Spektrum; which has hosted all the Norwegian finals since 2001. The hosts were Kåre Magnus Bergh and Silya Nymoen, who also hosted the finals in 2015 and 2016, and the former also in 2017. Ten songs participated in the final, and like 2017, the winner was chosen by the viewers together with ten international jury groups. Alexander Rybak won the competition with his self-composed song "That's How You Write a Song". Rybak also won both the Norwegian and international finals in 2009. Rybak represented Norway in the Eurovision Song Contest 2018 in Portugal in May 2018. There, the song finished as number 15 in the final.

== Background ==
As in previous years, NRK invited Norwegian and foreign musicians to submit songs to the competition. This time, however, the invitation came in record time – already on 31 January 2017, a month and a half before the final of Melodi Grand Prix 2017. "transl. We are in the run-up to this year's MGP final, but we are working in parallel to find songs and artists for MGP 2018. This is a part of a long-term plan for Norway to win the Eurovision Song Contest again", said project manager Stig Karlsen. The submission deadline for contributions was 10 September 2017.

When the deadline had expired, NRK had received close to 1,200 songs, which was a new record for the second year in a row. The submitted songs were filtered down to around 100 and then assessed by a listening group of around 50 people. The ten finalists were presented during a press conference on 15 January 2018, and the songs were released in their entirety on the same day.

Among the participants were former winners such as Alexander Rybak, Stella Mwangi and Aleksander Walmann. Otherwise, established artists such as Alejandro Fuentes, Nicoline Berg Kaasin and Ida Maria participated.

Ahead of the final, however, the newcomer Rebecca and "Who We Are" were the clear favorites with betting companies and the Norwegian Grand Prix club. In the seats behind were Alexander Rybak as well as Stella and Alexandra. However, Vidar Villa's "Moren din" was the most played song by the participants on the streaming service Spotify. The day before the final, "Moren din" had been played over one million times, while runner-up "Scandilove" had just over 300,000 plays on Spotify.

== The shipment ==
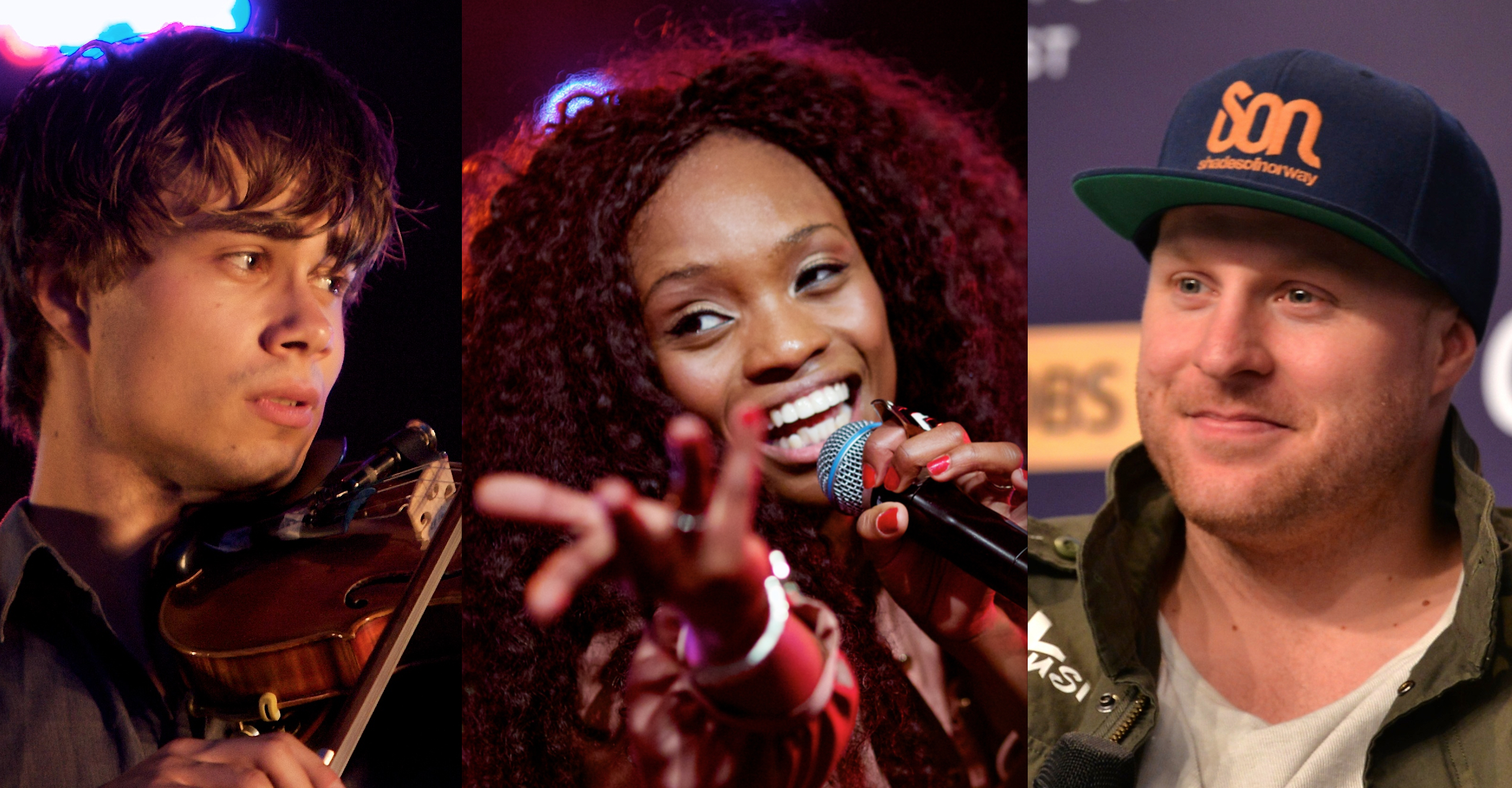
Alexander Rybak, Stella Mwangi and Aleksander Walmann were among the participants. Credit: Ernst Vikne and Mykola Swarnyk

As a prelude to the final, NRK produced several top-up programs online, radio and television. On NRK P1, the artists were presented two by two every Saturday in the program Snart MGP, and then daily during the final week on Nitimen. In addition, NRK1 had daily evening broadcasts from Oslo Spektrum. The broadcasts went live on NRK1 as part of the evening program Norge nå. The final was broadcast live on NRK1 and NRK TV from 19:55 to 22:18. The broadcast was also broadcast on NRK P1 with Ole Christian Øen as commentator.

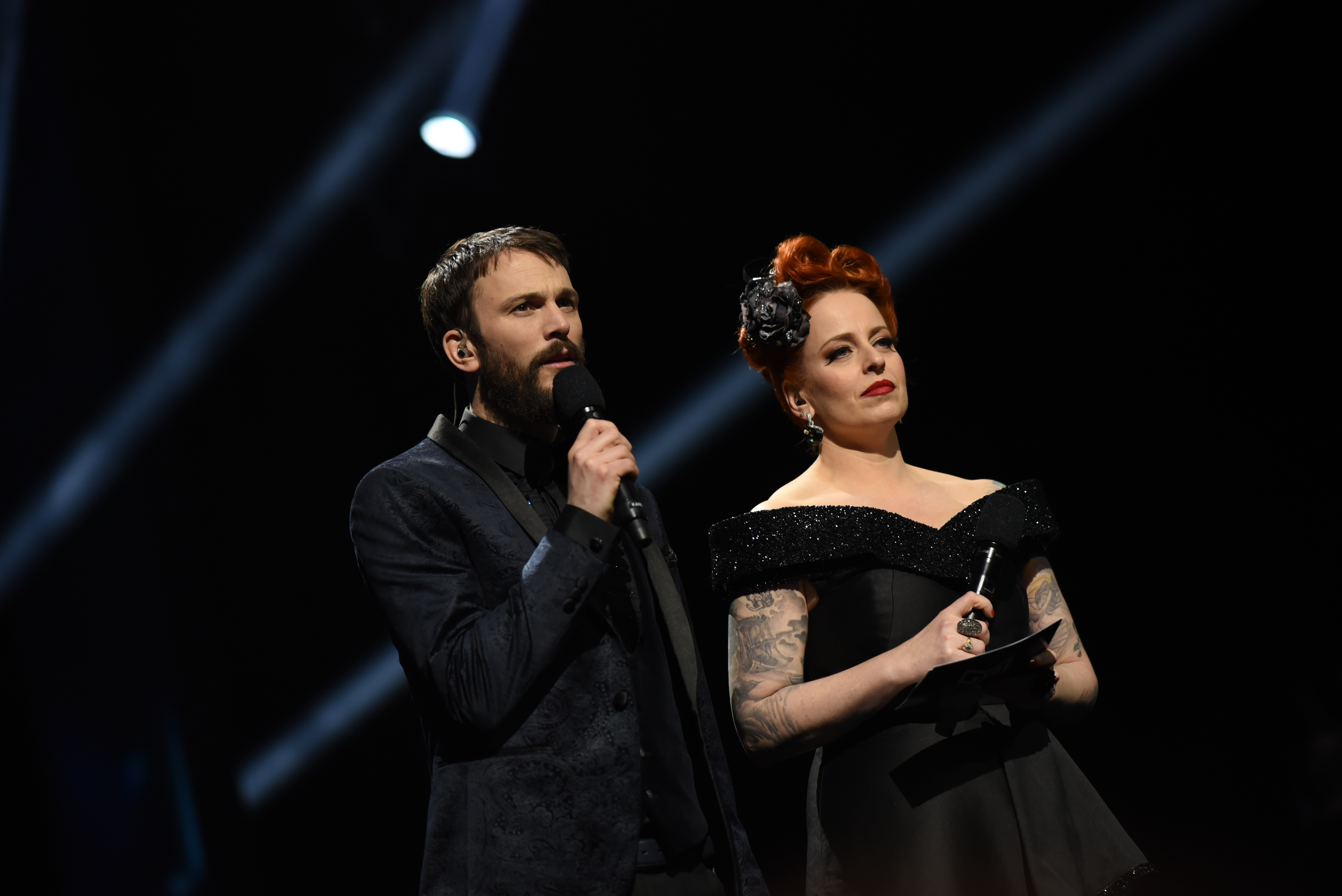
The presenters were Kåre Magnus Bergh and Silya Nymoen. Credit: Martin Fjellanger, EuroVisionary

During the broadcast, NRK visited a Grand Prix party in Trondheim. In addition, the channel paid tribute to viewers and supporters of the competition, among other things, an enthusiastic fan was brought up on stage and paid tribute with a wreath and song. In the intermission number before the gold final, Karoline Krüger and Anita Skorgan performed with "For vår jord", which won the competition 30 years earlier. In the break before the gold duel, JOWST and Aleksander Walmann performed with last year's winning tune, "Grab the Moment". Also on stage were the Oslo bassoon choir and Didrik Solli-Tangen.

== Participants ==
The entries were announced on 15 January, while the starting order was announced on 2 March.

=== First round ===
No.	Title	Artist	Songwriters	Status
1	"You Got Me"	Stella and Alexandra	Gustav Eurén, Niclas Arn, Stella Mwangi and Andreas Alfredsson	Gold final
2	"Talk to the Hand"	Aleksander Walmann	Joakim With Steen, Jonas McDonnell and Magnus Klausen	Gold final
3	"Scandilove"	Ida Maria	Ida Maria Børli Sivertsen and Stefan Törnby	Out
4	"Light Me Up"	Nicoline	Nicoline Berg Kaasin, Johan Larsson and Emilie Adams	Out
5	"I Like I Like I Like"	Tom Hugo	Tom Hugo Hermansen	Out
6	"Stop the Music"	Charla K	Charla K, Per Gessle and Alex Shield	Out
7	"Tengo Otra"	Alejandro Fuentes	Alejandro Fuentes, Angel Arce Pututi and Alejandro Pututi	Out
8	"Moren din"	Vidar Villa	Vidar André Mohaugen, Jonas Thomassen and Martin Thomassen	Out
9	"Who We Are"	Rebecca	Kjetil Mørland	Gold final
10	"That's How You Write a Song"	Alexander Rybak	Alexander Rybak	Gold final

=== Gold final and gold duel ===
No.	Title	Artist	Songwriters	Place
1	"You Got Me"	Stella and Alexandra	Gustav Eurén, Niclas Arn, Stella Mwangi and Andreas Alfredsson	3
2	"Talk to the Hand"	Aleksander Walmann	Joakim With Steen, Jonas McDonnell and Magnus Klausen	4
9	"Who We Are"	Rebecca	Kjetil Mørland	2
10	"That's How You Write a Song"	Alexander Rybak	Alexander Rybak	1

== Voting ==
=== First round ===
In the first round, the international juries voted on the entries with points in denominations 1–8, 10 and 12. There were ten international juries with five members in each group. In total, the ten juries awarded 580 points, and the television viewers had the same number of points to distribute. The viewers' points were distributed based on the percentage each song received. If a contribution received 10 percent of the SMS votes, this song received 10 percent of the viewers' 580 points - i.e. 58 points. The four songs with the most points advanced to the gold final. Only the jury's favorites were read out during the voting, the full result from the first round was not made public.

No.	Title	France	Russia	Czechia	Denmark	Bulgaria	Estonia	North Macedonia	Israel	Sweden	United Kingdom
1	"You Got Me"	France									United Kingdom
2	"Talk to the Hand"								Israel		
3	"Scandilove"										
4	"Light Me Up"										
5	"I Like I Like I Like"										
6	"Stop the Music"										
7	"Tengo Otra"										
8	"Moren din"										
9	"Who We Are"				Denmark	Bulgaria				Sweden	
10	"That's How You Write a Song"		Russia	Czechia			Estonia	North Macedonia			
Spokespersons for the juries
France – Edoardo Grassi; Russia – Ekaterina Orlova; Czechia – Jan Bors; Denmark – Molly Plank; Bulgaria – Vasil Ivanov; Estonia – Mart Normet; North Macedonia – Meri Popova; Israel – Alon Amir; Sweden – Helen Mattsson; United Kingdom – William Lee Adams

=== Gold final ===
In the gold final, only Norwegian viewers voted. After a short reprise of the songs, the four gold finalists were put into two pairs. The winners from each pair then met in a gold duel. The gold duelists received the votes from the first part of the gold final. The vote numbers in the gold final as well as the names of the international judges were published on nrk.no after the final.

No.	Title	Artist	Gold final	Gold duel	Place
1	"You Got Me"	Stella and Alexandra	29,784	Not eligible	3
2	"Talk to the Hand"	Aleksander Walmann	7,927	Not eligible	4
9	"Who We Are"	Rebecca	46,260	123,504	2
10	"That's How You Write a Song"	Alexander Rybak	133,164	306,393	1

== Events ==
After two years, Jan Fredrik Karlsen chose to step down as musical director of Melodi Grand Prix, and instead project manager Stig Karlsen took over the job. Stig Karlsen told NRK that the international juries would also be used in 2018. In addition, the Melodi Grand Prix editors used a reference group consisting of internal and external musicians, Eurovision fans and representatives from the public to select the ten final songs for the final.

This year too, the editors opened registration for next year's final even before this year's final had been held. Registration for Melodi Grand Prix 2019 already opened on 31 January 2018 with a deadline of 9 September of the same year. It would also turn out that two of the participants from 2018, Tom Hugo and Alexandra Rotan, would win Melodi Grand Prix 2019 as members of KEiiNO.

=== Reactions to the broadcast ===
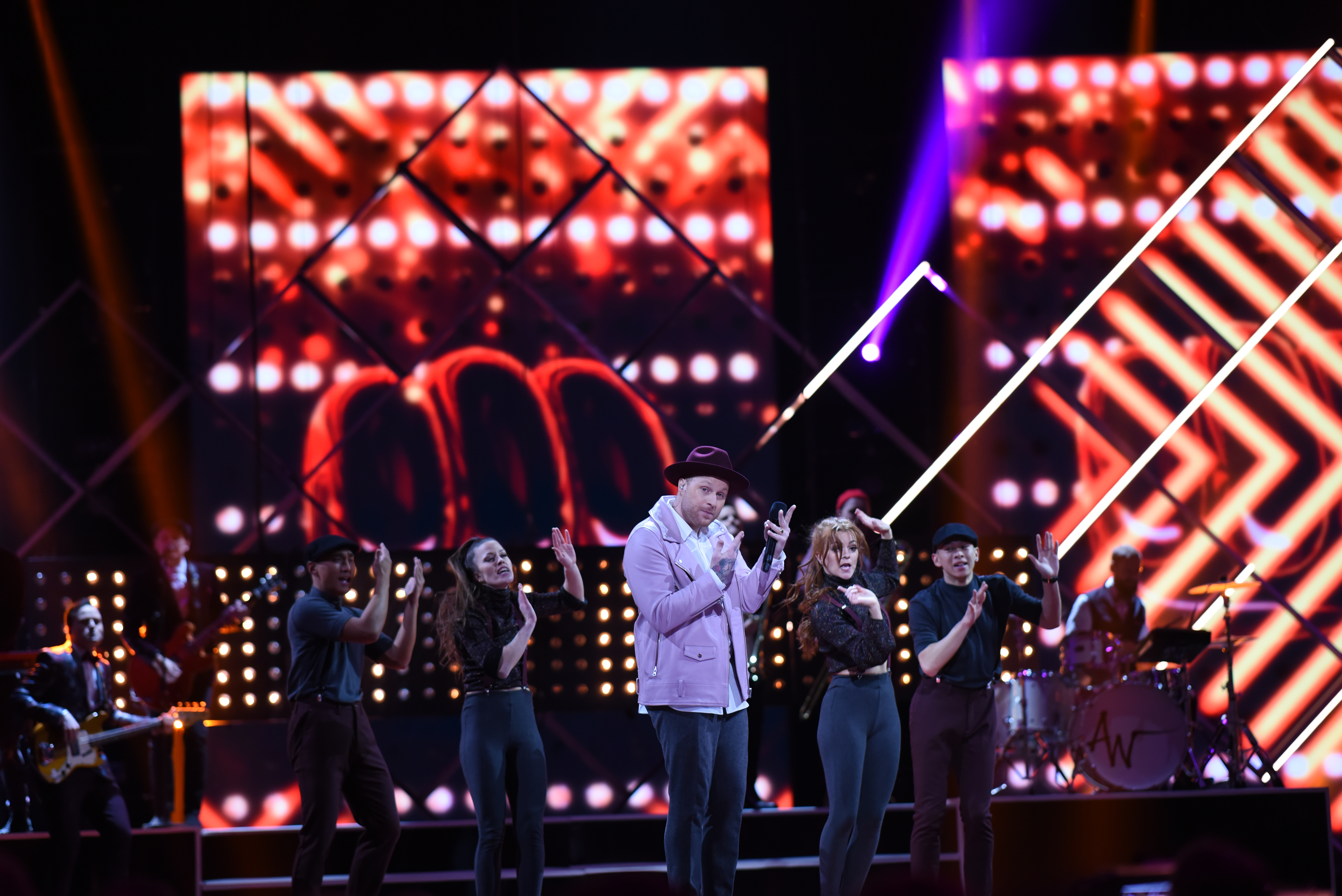
Aleksander Walmann finished in fourth place. Credit: Martin Fjellanger, EuroVisionary

In general, press, fans and the public were positive after the broadcast. After the show, however, there were several media reports that NRK had put on "false cheering" in the broadcast, in order to better bring out the cheering and applause of the audience in Oslo Spektrum. "transl. It is relatively common for television productions to compensate with the addition of content sound to compensate for sound that is difficult to capture in demanding environments", said project manager Stig Karlsen to the magazine Kampanje. Ethics advisor Gunnar Bodahl-Johansen at the Department of Journalism, on the other hand, was skeptical of the practice and believed it helped to weaken the broadcast's credibility.

Several of the participants, including Vidar Villa's team, also believed that the international expert juries would favor English-language contributions over Norwegian. NRK believed the fear was unfounded and responded by publishing the names of all 50 international jury members after the broadcast. Dagsavisen journalist David Stenerud believed that NRK favored Alexander Rybak, among other things by giving him starting number 10 by the presenters several times asking the other artists about Rybak's singing and performance during the broadcast. NRK denied that they had favored Rybak, and silver winner Rebecca emphasized that she did not feel run over or unfairly treated.

The final was watched by 1,001,000 viewers, down around 150,000 viewers from the previous year. In the age group 10–29, the viewing share was 78 per cent.

=== Reactions to the result ===
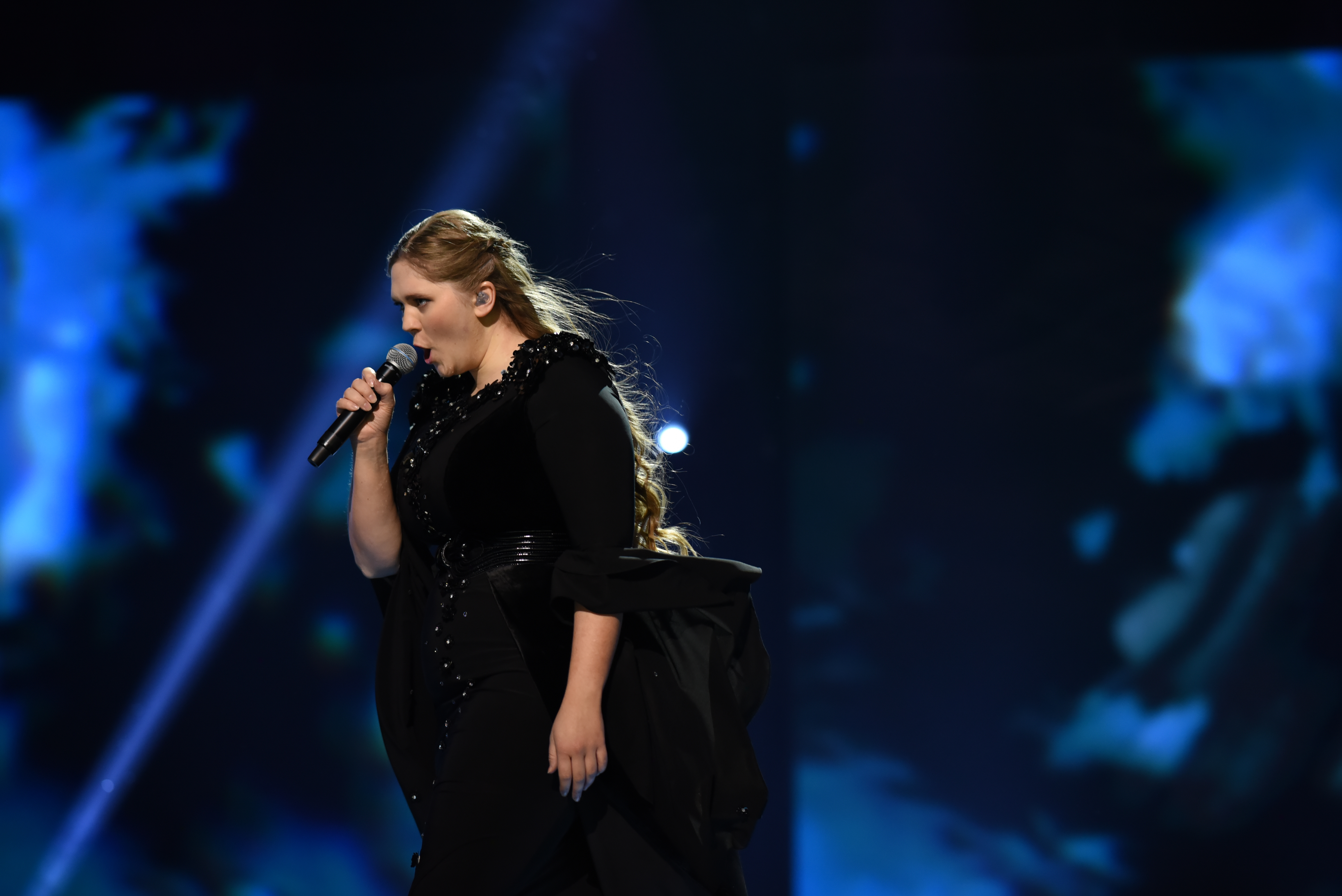
Rebecca came second with "Who We Are".

Alexander Rybak won the final with over 300,000 votes – around 2.5 times more than runner-up "Who We Are". This was Rybak's second win in the competition, and after the broadcast there were divided opinions about the winning entry. "transl. Some think we have a chance to win, while others are just looking forward to Alexander Rybak having to wipe his grin when Norway breaks into the semi-finals," said Morten Thomassen, head of the Norwegian Grand Prix Club, to NRK. Aftenposten thought it was "transl. a gamble" to send Rybak to the Eurovision Song Contest in Lisbon.

However, "That's How You Write a Song" went straight to the top of the Norwegian iTunes chart after the final – along with several of the other contestant songs. The winning song also entered the top 10 of the most streamed songs on Spotify in Norway. Over the following week, however, the mainstream declined rapidly, and the winning song only had about half as many plays as the previous winning song "Grab the Moment". Rybak's winning song also only reached 28th place on the VG list before the international competition.

Although the winning song did not become a major commercial success in Norway after the win, Norway's odds of winning the Eurovision Song Contest fell sharply. The week after the victory, Norway rose from 18th place and up to the top 10 among most international betting companies. In the weeks before the Eurovision Song Contest, Norway was in seventh place among the biggest winning candidates. At the same time before the 2017 competition, "Grab the Moment" was in 27th place.

== See also ==
- Melodi Grand Prix
- Eurovision Song Contest 2018
