= Norway in the Eurovision Song Contest 2019 =

- Eurovision Song Contest 2019
- Participating broadcaster: Norsk rikskringkasting (NRK)
- Country: Norway
- Selection process: Melodi Grand Prix 2019
- Selection date: 2 March 2019

Competing entry
- Song: "Spirit in the Sky"
- Artist: Keiino
- Songwriters: Tom Hugo Hermansen; Fred-René Buljo; Alexandra Rotan; Henrik Tala; Alex Olsson; Rüdiger Schramm

Placement
- Semi-final result: Qualified (7th, 210 points)
- Final result: 6th, 331 points

Participation chronology

Norway was represented at the Eurovision Song Contest 2019 with the song "Spirit in the Sky", written by Tom Hugo Hermansen, Fred-René Buljo, Alexandra Rotan, Henrik Tala, Alex Olsson and Rüdiger Schramm. The song was performed by the group Keiino. The Norwegian broadcaster Norsk rikskringkasting (NRK) organised the national final Melodi Grand Prix 2019 in order to select the Norwegian entry for the 2019 contest in Tel Aviv, Israel. Ten entries competed in a show that took place on 2 March 2019 and the winner was determined over three rounds of voting. In the first round of voting, the combination of votes from ten international jury groups and a public vote selected the top four entries to advance to the competition's second round—the Gold Final. In the second round of voting, a public vote exclusively selected the top two entries to advance to the competition's third round—the Gold Duel. In the third round of voting, a public vote again exclusively selected "Spirit in the Sky" performed by Keiino as the winner with 231,937 votes.

Norway was drawn to compete in the second semi-final of the Eurovision Song Contest which took place on 16 May 2019. Performing during the show in position 15, "Spirit in the Sky" was announced among the top 10 entries of the second semi-final and therefore qualified to compete in the final on 18 May. It was later revealed that Norway placed seventh out of the 17 participating countries in the semi-final with 210 points. In the final, Norway performed in position 15 and placed sixth out of the 26 participating countries, scoring 331 points.

== Background ==
Prior to the 2019 contest, Norway had participated in the Eurovision Song Contest 57 times since their first entry in 1960. Norway had won the contest on three occasions: in 1985 with the song "La det swinge" performed by Bobbysocks!, in 1995 with the song "Nocturne" performed by Secret Garden, and in 2009 with the song "Fairytale" performed by Alexander Rybak. Norway also had the two dubious distinctions of having finished last in the Eurovision final more than any other country and for having the most "nul points" (zero points) in the contest, the latter being a record the nation shared together with Austria. The country had finished last eleven times and had failed to score a point during four contests. Following the introduction of semi-finals for the 2004, Norway has finished in the top ten seven times, including their 2017 entry "Grab the Moment" performed by Jowst.

The Norwegian national broadcaster, Norsk rikskringkasting (NRK), broadcasts the event within Norway and organises the selection process for the nation's entry. NRK confirmed their intentions to participate at the 2019 Eurovision Song Contest on 31 January 2018. The broadcaster has traditionally organised the national final Melodi Grand Prix, which has selected the Norwegian entry for the Eurovision Song Contest in all but one of their participation. Along with their participation confirmation, NRK revealed details regarding their selection procedure and announced the organization of Melodi Grand Prix 2019 in order to select the 2019 Norwegian entry.

== Before Eurovision ==
=== Melodi Grand Prix 2019 ===
Melodi Grand Prix 2019 was the 57th edition of the Norwegian national final Melodi Grand Prix and selected Norway's entry for the Eurovision Song Contest 2019. The show took place on 2 March 2019 at the Oslo Spektrum in Oslo, hosted by Heidi Ruud Ellingsen and Kåre Magnus Bergh. The show was televised on NRK1, broadcast via radio with commentary by Ole Christian Øen on NRK P1 as well as streamed online on NRK TV. The national final was watched by 961,000 viewers in Norway with a market share of 62.1%.

==== Competing entries ====
A submission period was opened by NRK between 31 January 2018 and 9 September 2018. Songwriters of any nationality were allowed to submit entries, while performers of the selected songs would be chosen by NRK in consultation with the songwriters. In addition to the public call for submissions, NRK reserved the right to directly invite certain artists and composers to compete. At the close of the deadline, over 1,000 submissions were received. Ten songs were selected for the competition by several focus groups and the competing acts and songs were revealed on 25 January 2019 during a press conference at NRK's Store Studio, presented by Heidi Ruud Ellingsen and Kåre Magnus Bergh and broadcast via NRK1 and online at mgp.no. Among the competing artists was former Norwegian Eurovision Song Contest entrant Mørland who represented the country in 2015 alongside Debrah Scarlett.

==== Final ====
Ten songs competed during the final on 2 March 2019. The winner was selected over three rounds of voting. In the first round, the top four entries were selected by a 50/50 combination of votes from ten international juries and a public vote to proceed to the second round, the Gold Final. The viewers and the juries each had a total of 580 points to award. Each jury group distributed their points as follows: 1–8, 10 and 12 points, and only the 12 points of each jury were announced during the show. The viewer vote was based on the percentage of votes each song achieved through the following voting methods: SMS and online voting. For example, if a song gained 10% of the viewer vote, then that entry would be awarded 10% of 580 points rounded to the nearest integer: 58 points. In the Gold Final, the top two entries were selected by public voting to proceed to the third round, the Gold Duel. In the Gold Duel, an additional round of public voting was held and the votes were aggregated to the results of the Gold Final, leading to the victory of "Spirit in the Sky" performed by Keiino with 231,937 votes.

In addition to the performances of the competing entries, the show was opened with two-time Norwegian Eurovision entrant Alexander Rybak performing his 2009 winning entry "Fairytale" and 2018 entry "That's How You Write a Song", while the interval act featured host Heidi Ruud Ellingsen, Tone Damli and 2006 Norwegian Eurovision entrant Christine Guldbrandsen performing "Ingen er så nydelig" by 1997 Norwegian Eurovision entrant Tor Endresen, and Israeli Eurovision 2018 winner Netta performing her entry "Toy".

Final – 2 March 2019
R/O	Artist	Song	Songwriter(s)	Result
1	Chris Medina	"We Try"	Chris Medina, Jason Gill, Tormod Løkling, Julimar Santos	—N/a
2	D'Sound	"Mr. Unicorn"	Kim Ofstad, Jonny Sjo, Mirjam Omdal, Magnus Martinsen, Tormod Martinsen	Advanced
3	Mørland	"En livredd mann"	Kjetil Mørland	—N/a
4	Anna-Lisa Kumoji	"Holla"	Ashley Hicklin, Jeroen Swinnen, Maria Broberg	Advanced
5 (Note: Due to technical difficulties in the performance, Erlend Bratland was allowed to perform again after all the performances.)	Erlend Bratland	"Sing for You"	Erlend Bratland, Arvid Solvang, Nils Egil Brandsæter	—N/a
6	Ingrid Berg Mehus	"Feel"	Ingrid Berg Mehus, Bjørnar Hopland, Anthony Modebe	—N/a
7	Hank von Hell	"Fake It"	Hans-Erik Dyvik Husby, Andreas Werling	—N/a
8	Carina Dahl	"Hold Me Down"	Ashley Hicklin, Jeroen Swinnen, Pele Loriano, Laurell Barker, Laura Groeseneken	—N/a
9	Adrian Jørgensen	"The Bubble"	Jonas McDonnell, Aleksander Walmann, Kjetil Mørland	Advanced
10	Keiino	"Spirit in the Sky"	Tom Hugo Hermansen, Fred-René Buljo, Alexandra Rotan, Henrik Tala, Alex Olsson, Rüdiger Schramm (Note: Rüdiger Schramm was later added as one of the composers of "Spirit in the Sky".)	Advanced

Detailed International Jury Votes
R/O	Song	Italy	Georgia	Spain	Denmark	Portugal	Switzerland	North Macedonia	Ireland	Hungary	Israel
R/O	Song	Italy	Georgia	Spain	Denmark	Portugal	Switzerland	North Macedonia	Ireland	Hungary	Israel
1	"We Try"										
2	"Mr. Unicorn"		X	X				X	X		
3	"En livredd mann"				X						
4	"Holla"	X									
5	"Sing for You"										
6	"Feel"										
7	"Fake It"										
8	"Hold Me Down"										
9	"The Bubble"					X	X			X	
10	"Spirit in the Sky"										X
International Jury Spokespersons
Italy: Nicola Caligiore; Georgia: Sopho Toroshelidze; Spain: Antonio Losada Vela; Denmark: Mads Enggaard; Portugal: Isabel Roma; Switzerland: Reto Peritz; North Macedonia: Aleksandra Jovanovska; Ireland: Zbyszek Zalinski; Hungary: Lőrinc Bubnó; Israel: Amit Wulff

Gold Final – 2 March 2019
R/O	Artist	Song	Televote	Place
1	D'Sound	"Mr. Unicorn"	11,123	3
2	Anna-Lisa Kumoji	"Holla"	6,718	4
3	Adrian Jørgensen	"The Bubble"	55,794	2
4	Keiino	"Spirit in the Sky"	98,328	1

Gold Duel – 2 March 2019
R/O	Artist	Song	Televote			Place
R/O	Artist	Song	Gold Final	Gold Duel	Total	Place
1	Adrian Jørgensen	"The Bubble"	55,794	106,814	162,608	2
2	Keiino	"Spirit in the Sky"	98,328	133,609	231,937	1

=== Preparation ===
Following Melodi Grand Prix 2019, Keiino filmed a music video for "Spirit in the Sky" at the studios of Krypton Film in Oslo. The video, which was directed by Martin Sofiedal and Alice Asplund, was released to the public on 4 April.

=== Promotion ===
Keiino made several appearances across Europe to specifically promote "Spirit in the Sky" as the Norwegian Eurovision entry. On 8 March, Keiino performed during the Melfest WKND Pre-party, which was held at the Club Estelle in Stockholm, Sweden. On 6 April, the group performed during the Eurovision in Concert event which was held at the AFAS Live venue in Amsterdam, Netherlands and hosted by Edsilia Rombley and Marlayne. On 12 April, Keiino performed during the Eurovision PreParty Riga, which was organised by OGAE Latvia and held at the Crystal Club Concert Hall in Riga, Latvia. On 14 April, Keiino performed during the London Eurovision Party, which was held at the Café de Paris venue in London, United Kingdom and hosted by Nicki French and Paddy O'Connell. The group concluded promotional activities by performing during the Eurovision Pre-Party Madrid event, which was held on 21 April at the Sala La Riviera venue in Madrid, Spain and hosted by Tony Aguilar and Julia Varela.

== At Eurovision ==
According to Eurovision rules, all nations with the exceptions of the host country and the "Big Five" (France, Germany, Italy, Spain and the United Kingdom) are required to qualify from one of two semi-finals in order to compete for the final; the top ten countries from each semi-final progress to the final. The European Broadcasting Union (EBU) split up the competing countries into six different pots based on voting patterns from previous contests, with countries with favourable voting histories put into the same pot. On 28 January 2019, an allocation draw was held which placed each country into one of the two semi-finals, as well as which half of the show they would perform in. Norway was placed into the second semi-final, to be held on 16 May 2019, and was scheduled to perform in the second half of the show.

Once all the competing songs for the 2019 contest had been released, the running order for the semi-finals was decided by the shows' producers rather than through another draw, so that similar songs were not placed next to each other. Norway was set to perform in position 15, following the entry from Albania and before the entry from the Netherlands.

In Norway, the two semi-finals and the final were broadcast on NRK1 with commentary by Olav Viksmo-Slettan. An alternative broadcast of the final was also televised on NRK3 with commentary by the hosts of the NRK P3 radio show P3morgen Ronny Brede Aase, Silje Reiten Nordnes and Markus Ekrem Neby. The final was also broadcast via radio on NRK P1 with commentary by Ole Christian Øen. The Norwegian spokesperson, who announced the top 12-point score awarded by the Norwegian jury during the final, was Alexander Rybak, who represented Norway in 2009, winning the competition for the country, and in 2018.

=== Semi-final ===
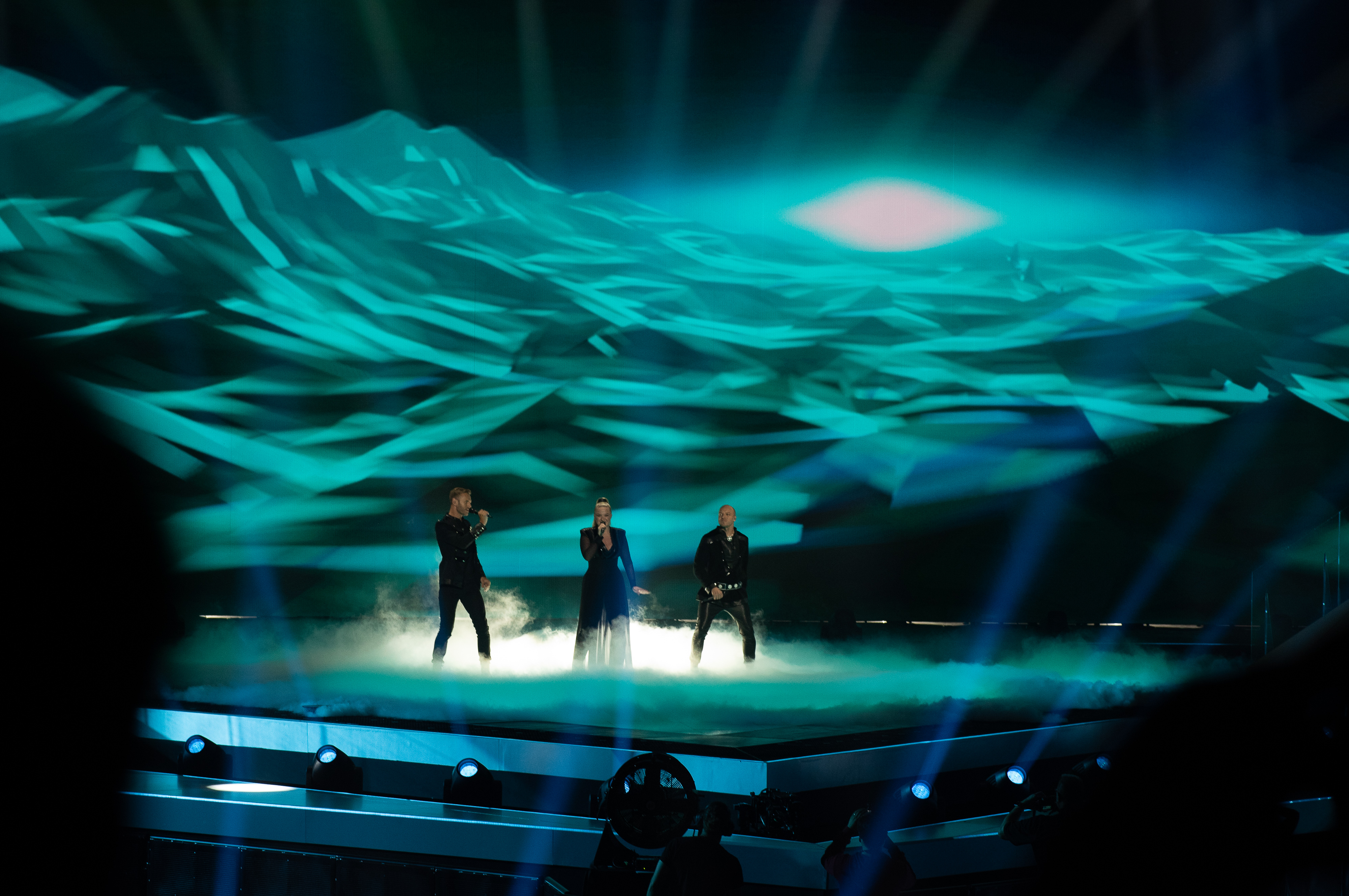
Keiino during a rehearsal before the second semi-final

Keiino took part in technical rehearsals on 6 and 10 May, followed by dress rehearsals on 15 and 16 May. This included the jury show on 15 May where the professional juries of each country watched and voted on the competing entries.

The Norwegian performance featured the members of Keiino performing on stage in black outfits. The group members began the performance on different part of the stage before moving to the centre as the song progresses. The stage colours transitioned from black and blue to red, yellow and gold and the LED screens displayed starry skies, snowy mountains in the colours of northern lights and fire. The performance also featured smoke and pyrotechnic flame effects. Keiino was joined by three off-stage backing vocalists: Frode Vassel, Kine Ludvigsen Fossheim and Marianne Pentha.

At the end of the show, Norway was announced as having finished in the top 10 and subsequently qualifying for the grand final. It was later revealed that Norway placed seventh in the semi-final, receiving a total of 210 points: 170 points from the televoting and 40 points from the juries.

=== Final ===
Shortly after the second semi-final, a winner's press conference was held for the ten qualifying countries. As part of this press conference, the qualifying artists took part in a draw to determine which half of the grand final they would subsequently participate in. This draw was done in the order the countries were announced during the semi-final. Norway was drawn to compete in the second half. Following this draw, the shows' producers decided upon the running order of the final, as they had done for the semi-finals. Norway was subsequently placed to perform in position 15, following the entry from Israel and before the entry from the United Kingdom.

Keiino once again took part in dress rehearsals on 17 and 18 May before the final, including the jury final where the professional juries cast their final votes before the live show. The group performed a repeat of their semi-final performance during the final on 18 May. Norway placed sixth in the final, scoring 331 points: 291 points from the televoting and 40 points from the juries.

=== Voting ===
Voting during the three shows involved each country awarding two sets of points from 1-8, 10 and 12: one from their professional jury and the other from televoting. Each nation's jury consisted of five music industry professionals who are citizens of the country they represent, with their names published before the contest to ensure transparency. This jury judged each entry based on: vocal capacity; the stage performance; the song's composition and originality; and the overall impression by the act. In addition, no member of a national jury was permitted to be related in any way to any of the competing acts in such a way that they cannot vote impartially and independently. The individual rankings of each jury member as well as the nation's televoting results were released shortly after the grand final.

Below is a breakdown of points awarded to Norway and awarded by Norway in the second semi-final and grand final of the contest, and the breakdown of the jury voting and televoting conducted during the two shows:

==== Points awarded to Norway ====
Points awarded to Norway (Semi-final 2)
Score	Televote	Jury
12 points	Albania; Denmark; Netherlands; Sweden	
10 points	Austria; Croatia; Germany; Ireland; Switzerland; United Kingdom	
8 points	Italy; Latvia; Lithuania; Malta; Russia	Denmark
7 points		Ireland
6 points		Switzerland
5 points	Armenia; Azerbaijan; Romania	Sweden
4 points	Moldova	Malta
3 points	North Macedonia	Austria; Moldova
2 points		Germany
1 point		Armenia; Lithuania

Points awarded to Norway (Final)
Score	Televote	Jury
12 points	Australia; Denmark; Germany; Iceland; Ireland; Netherlands; Sweden; United Kingdom	
10 points	Czech Republic; Estonia; Finland; Hungary; Israel; Italy; Russia	
8 points	Austria; Belarus; France; Latvia; Lithuania; Poland; Switzerland	
7 points	Belgium; Malta; Spain	Moldova; Switzerland
6 points	Portugal; Slovenia	Ireland
5 points	Albania; Armenia; Croatia; North Macedonia	Denmark; Germany
4 points	Romania; Serbia	Portugal; Sweden
3 points	Moldova; San Marino	
2 points		
1 point	Azerbaijan; Cyprus	Austria; Poland

==== Points awarded by Norway ====
Points awarded by Norway (Semi-final 2)
Score	Televote	Jury
12 points	Lithuania	Sweden
10 points	Sweden	Netherlands
8 points	Denmark	Switzerland
7 points	Switzerland	North Macedonia
6 points	Azerbaijan	Azerbaijan
5 points	Netherlands	Denmark
4 points	Russia	Malta
3 points	Malta	Russia
2 points	Albania	Moldova
1 point	North Macedonia	Latvia

Points awarded by Norway (Final)
Score	Televote	Jury
12 points	Sweden	Czech Republic
10 points	Iceland	North Macedonia
8 points	Netherlands	Sweden
7 points	Italy	Netherlands
6 points	Switzerland	Switzerland
5 points	Denmark	Azerbaijan
4 points	Australia	Denmark
3 points	Azerbaijan	Italy
2 points	Estonia	United Kingdom
1 point	Russia	Cyprus

==== Detailed voting results ====
The following members comprised the Norwegian jury:

- Knut Bjørnar Asphol (jury chairperson) – musician, music producer, songwriter
- Finn-Ulrik Berntsen – music producer
- Jenny Jenssen – artist
- Kamilla Wigestrand – artist, songwriter
- Maiken Kroken – musician, singer, vocal coach

Detailed voting results from Norway (Semi-final 2)
R/O	Country	Jury							Televote	
R/O	Country	F.-U. Berntsen	K. Bjørnar Asphol	J. Jenssen	K. Wigestrand	M. Kroken	Rank	Points	Rank	Points
01	Armenia	9	17	7	17	16	14		16	
02	Ireland	15	16	17	15	17	17		15	
03	Moldova	8	14	8	11	6	9	2	14	
04	Switzerland	5	2	3	4	5	3	8	4	7
05	Latvia	11	15	15	3	14	10	1	12	
06	Romania	14	11	11	7	9	11		13	
07	Denmark	7	10	2	13	2	6	5	3	8
08	Sweden	2	1	5	1	1	1	12	2	10
09	Austria	17	12	12	16	13	16		17	
10	Croatia	16	9	9	8	12	12		11	
11	Malta	4	8	14	12	7	7	4	8	3
12	Lithuania	10	7	13	14	15	13		1	12
13	Russia	6	6	10	10	11	8	3	7	4
14	Albania	13	13	16	9	10	15		9	2
15	Norway									
16	Netherlands	3	3	6	2	3	2	10	6	5
17	North Macedonia	12	4	1	5	4	4	7	10	1
18	Azerbaijan	1	5	4	6	8	5	6	5	6

Detailed voting results from Norway (Final)
R/O	Country	Jury							Televote	
R/O	Country	F. Berntsen	K. Bjørnar Asphol	J. Jenssen	K. Wigestrand	M. Kroken	Rank	Points	Rank	Points
01	Malta	13	7	13	13	7	11		12	
02	Albania	23	16	23	19	23	22		18	
03	Czech Republic	1	1	2	3	3	1	12	13	
04	Germany	20	10	21	15	17	17		24	
05	Russia	7	14	8	12	16	13		10	1
06	Denmark	10	11	4	9	4	7	4	6	5
07	San Marino	24	17	24	24	25	24		15	
08	North Macedonia	12	3	1	2	2	2	10	17	
09	Sweden	3	4	5	5	1	3	8	1	12
10	Slovenia	16	19	22	14	21	20		16	
11	Cyprus	6	12	14	20	5	10	1	19	
12	Netherlands	4	2	10	4	12	4	7	3	8
13	Greece	25	25	25	22	24	25		25	
14	Israel	18	23	17	17	20	21		21	
15	Norway									
16	United Kingdom	11	13	7	6	8	9	2	22	
17	Iceland	15	9	11	25	22	15		2	10
18	Estonia	21	8	20	11	11	14		9	2
19	Belarus	22	18	18	16	15	19		23	
20	Azerbaijan	2	5	6	7	14	6	5	8	3
21	France	14	20	15	23	18	18		14	
22	Italy	8	21	16	1	13	8	3	4	7
23	Serbia	17	22	12	18	10	16		20	
24	Switzerland	5	6	3	8	6	5	6	5	6
25	Australia	9	15	9	10	9	12		7	4
26	Spain	19	24	19	21	19	23		11	
