= Kåre Magnus Bergh =

Norwegian television host

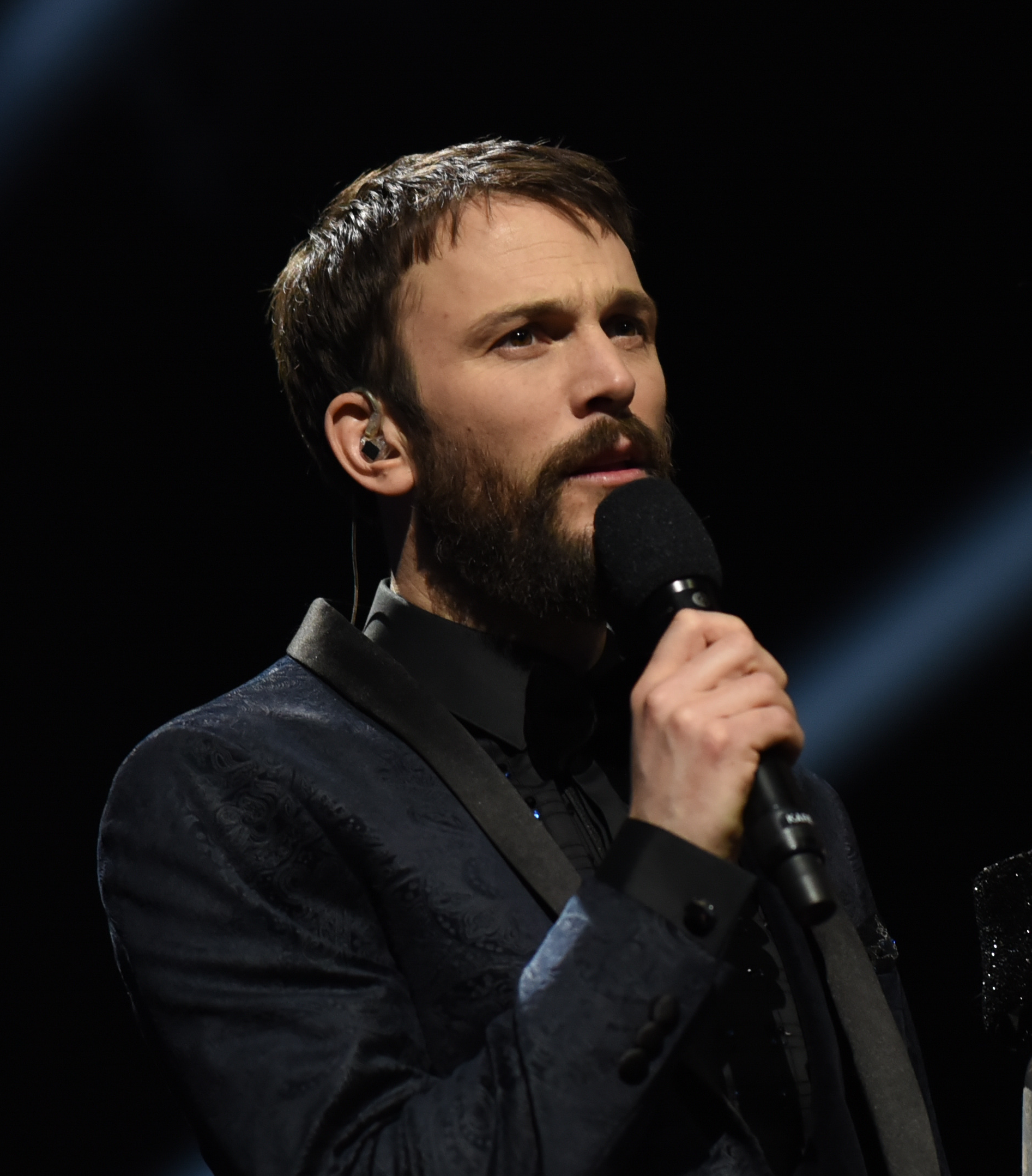
- Bergh at the Melodi Grand Prix 2018, which he hosted.
- Born: 22 December 1978 (age 47); Hamar Municipality
- Occupation: TV presenter

Kåre Magnus Bergh (born 22 December 1978) is a Norwegian television host. Among other things, he has hosted several editions of the Melodi Grand Prix, which he is one of the program managers for, and the Stjernekamp.

== Personal life ==
Bergh was raised in Hamar, but has lived in Bergen and Oslo, among other places. He studied at the Bergen Academy of Art and Design, and from 2003 to 2004 he studied at the Städelschule in Frankfurt, Germany.

== Career ==
From 2005 to 2007, he hosted the Norwegian show Idol at the television station TV2. He started working as a host at the rock radio station P4 Bandit in November 2006.

In 2010, Bergh hosted the children's music competition Melodi Grand Prix Junior with Ingrid Gjessing Linhave. He hosted the Stjernekamp in 2012 with NRK and continued his work there in the following years. With Linhave he was also the program leader for the Norwegian television programs Kvelden før kvelden and Big Bang. Furthermore, he hosted episodes of the program Sommeråpent in 2013, 2015, and 2016.

Bergh hosted the Melodi Grand Prix from 2015 to 2022:

- Three times together with Silya Nymoen (2015, 2016 and 2018).
- In 2017 with Line Elvsåshagen.
- In 2019 with Heidi Ruud Ellingsen.
- In 2020 and 2021 he led the competition together with Ingrid Gjessing Linhave and Ronny Brede Aase.
- In 2021 with Silje Nordnes.
- In 2022 together with Annika Momrak and Mikkel Niva.
