= Melodi Grand Prix Junior 2010 =

Norwegian television song competition

Date and venue
- Final: 4 September 2010
- Venue: Oslo Spektrum; Oslo, Norway

Organisation
- Broadcaster: Norsk rikskringkasting (NRK)
- Presenters: Kåre Magnus Bergh; Ingrid Gjessing Linhave

Participants
- Number of entries: 10

Vote
- Voting system: Televoting, the winner is the one with most votes
- Winning song: "Svikter aldri igjen" by Torstein Snekvik

The Melodi Grand Prix Junior 2010 was Norway's ninth national Melodi Grand Prix Junior for young singers aged 8 to 15. It was held in Oslo Spektrum, Oslo, Norway and broadcast live Norwegian Broadcasting Corporation (NRK).

The winner was Torstein Snekvik with the song "Svikter aldri igjen" (Norwegian for Never fails again). The trophy that was handed to him by 2009's winner Jørgen Dahl Moe. Presenters were Kåre Magnus Bergh and Ingrid Gjessing Linhave. AF1, Didrik Solli-Tangen and Tine Thing Helseth performed during the competition breaks.

After singing his winning song, Torstein and the three other super finalists joined in to sing "Du er suveren" (translated as You are sovereign), written by Ronny Wikmark and Skjalg Raaen. "Du er suveren" was the joint song recorded by all the ten finalists in MGPjr 2010

The album Melodi Grand Prix Junior 2010 containing the songs of the finals and "Du er suveren"reached No. 1 on the VG-lista Norwegian Albums Chart on weeks 37 and 39 of 2010 staying at the top of the charts for 2 weeks.

== Finalists ==
There were 10 finalists, that included 8 solo artists and two bands singing a variety of songs including ballads, pop and rap.

== Results ==
=== First round ===
No.	Artist	Song	Result
01	Alexandra Rotan	"Det vi vil"	Super finalist
02	Murphy's Law	"Åbbår"	Super finalist
03	Julie Engelsviken	"Berømt"	Super finalist
04	Sara Jørundland Berg	"Utfordring"	Eliminated
05	Emilie Lilleås Christoffersen	"Hvorfor skal det være sånn?"	Eliminated
06	Arbaz Farooq	"Dans jente, dans"	Eliminated
07	Maria Rullestad Teigen	"På grunn av deg"	Eliminated
08	Basic Warning	"Kom til oss"	Eliminated
09	Torstein Snekvik	"Svikter aldri igjen"	Super finalist
10	Johanna Knudsen	"Følg din drøm"	Eliminated

=== Super Final ===
The exact number of public votes was unknown. Only the winner was announced.

No.	Artist	Song	Position
01	Alexandra Rotan	"Det vi vil"	Unknown
02	Murphy's Law	"Åbbår"	Unknown
03	Julie Engelsviken	"Berømt"	Unknown
04	Torstein Snekvik	"Svikter aldri igjen"	1
