= Amina Sewali =

Norwegian singer (born 1989)

- Born: 23 June 1989; Uganda
- Origin: Oslo, Norway
- Died: 28 January 2026 (aged 36)
- Genres: Indie pop; pop
- Occupations: Singer; songwriter; actress
- Years active: 2005–present
- Label: Warner Music Norway

Amina Sewali (1989-2026) was a Norwegian singer, songwriter, and actress. She is best known for performing as Solveig in a 2014 production of Peer Gynt at the National Theatre in Oslo, and took part in Melodi Grand Prix 2017 with the song "Mesterverk".

== Life and career ==
In 2006, Sewali performed as a singer and dancer in a production of Izzat – en kjærlighetsopera at the Norwegian National Opera and Ballet. The following year, she joined the show Glatte gater, broadcast on NRK. The show was turned into a film, 99% Ærlig, the following year. The film went on to be nominated for "Best Music" and "Best Documentary" at the 2009 Amanda Awards. In 2010, she was a lyricist, composer, and actress in Tæsjern på Grønland, a modern-day adaptation of the play The Merchant of Venice by William Shakespeare. In 2012, she performed at the Oslo Philharmonic.

In 2010, she released her debut single, "One More Digit", after being signed by Warner Music Norway. Her debut self-titled studio album was released in 2011, and was produced by Even Johansen. She was released from her label in 2011. In 2013, she went on a tour with Concerts Norway, called Amina Sewali – Gjør det selv!. In 2014, Sewali performed as Solveig in a 2014 production of Peer Gynt at the National Theatre in Oslo. In 2017, she was announced as a participant in Melodi Grand Prix 2017 with the song "Mesterverk". She competed in the final on 11 March 2017.

== Personal life ==
Sewali was born in Uganda, but emigrated to Norway at age four, where she settled in Oslo.

== Discography ==
=== Albums ===
List of albums, with selected chart positions and certifications
Title	Album details	Peak chart positions
Title	Album details	NOR
Amina Sewali	Released: 3 June 2011; Label: Indipendente; Formats: CD, digital download	33

=== Singles ===
Year	Song	Peak positions	Album
Year	Song	NOR	Album
2010	"One More Digit"	—	Amina Sewali
2011	"Hero"	—	Amina Sewali
2012	"20 000 Horses" / "Masterplan"	—	Non-album singles
2015	"Triangel"	—	Non-album singles
2017	"Mesterverk"	—	Non-album singles
