= Jonas McDonnell =

- Born: 2 May 1986 (age 39); Hønefoss, Norway
- Genres: Pop; trance; hip hop
- Occupations: Songwriter; instrumentalist
- Instrument: Guitar

Jonas McDonnell (born 2 May 1986) is a Norwegian songwriter and musician from Hønefoss. He has written the lyrics to the song Grab the Moment as won Melodi Grand Prix 2017. The song was sung by JOWST and Aleksander Walmann. The song came in 10th place in the Eurovision Song Contest 2017 final in Kyiv in May 2017.

== Background ==
McDonnell has been playing music since he was a teenager and has been a member of several bands since. As a 15-year-old, he made trance music using the music software Fruity Loops, and as a 16-year-old he started to rap and write his own songs. After a few years of rapping, he began to write and sing songs within the pop genre, accompanied by guitar.

McDonnell has studied media, ICT and design at Volda University College.
