= Mykola Swarnyk =

Ukrainian photographer, Wikipedian, public figure

- Микола Сварник
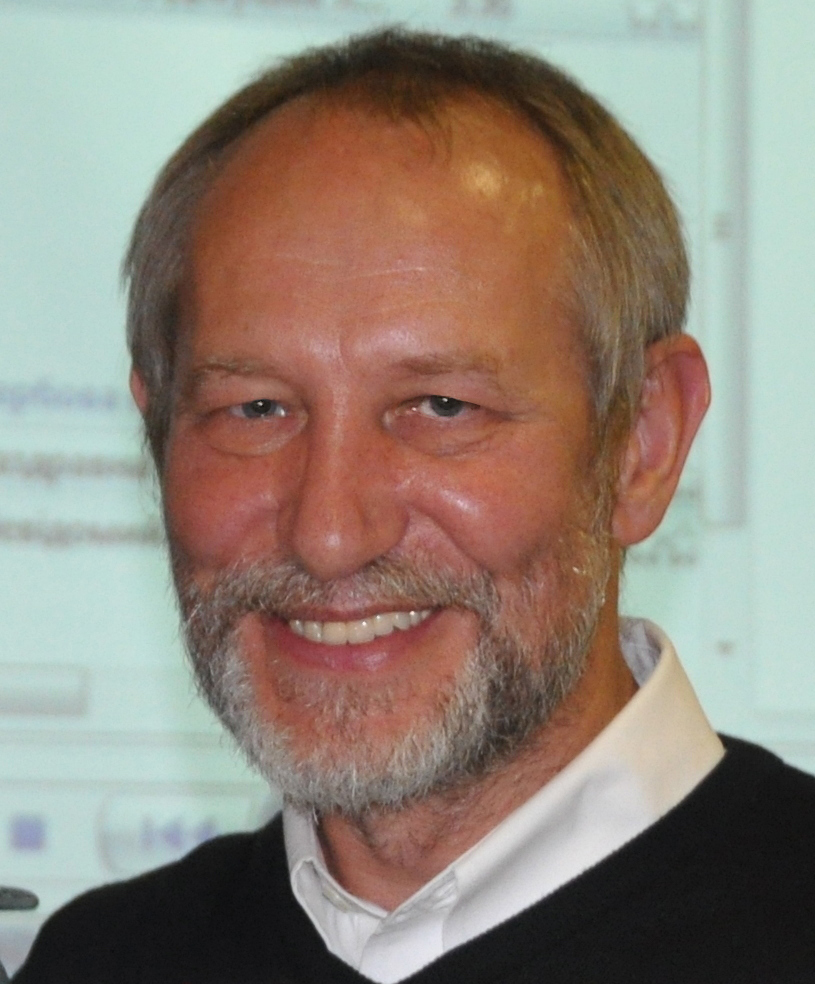
- Born: 23 February 1957 (age 69); Lutsk, Volyn Oblast
- Education: Lviv Forestry Institute
- Awards: Order of Merit

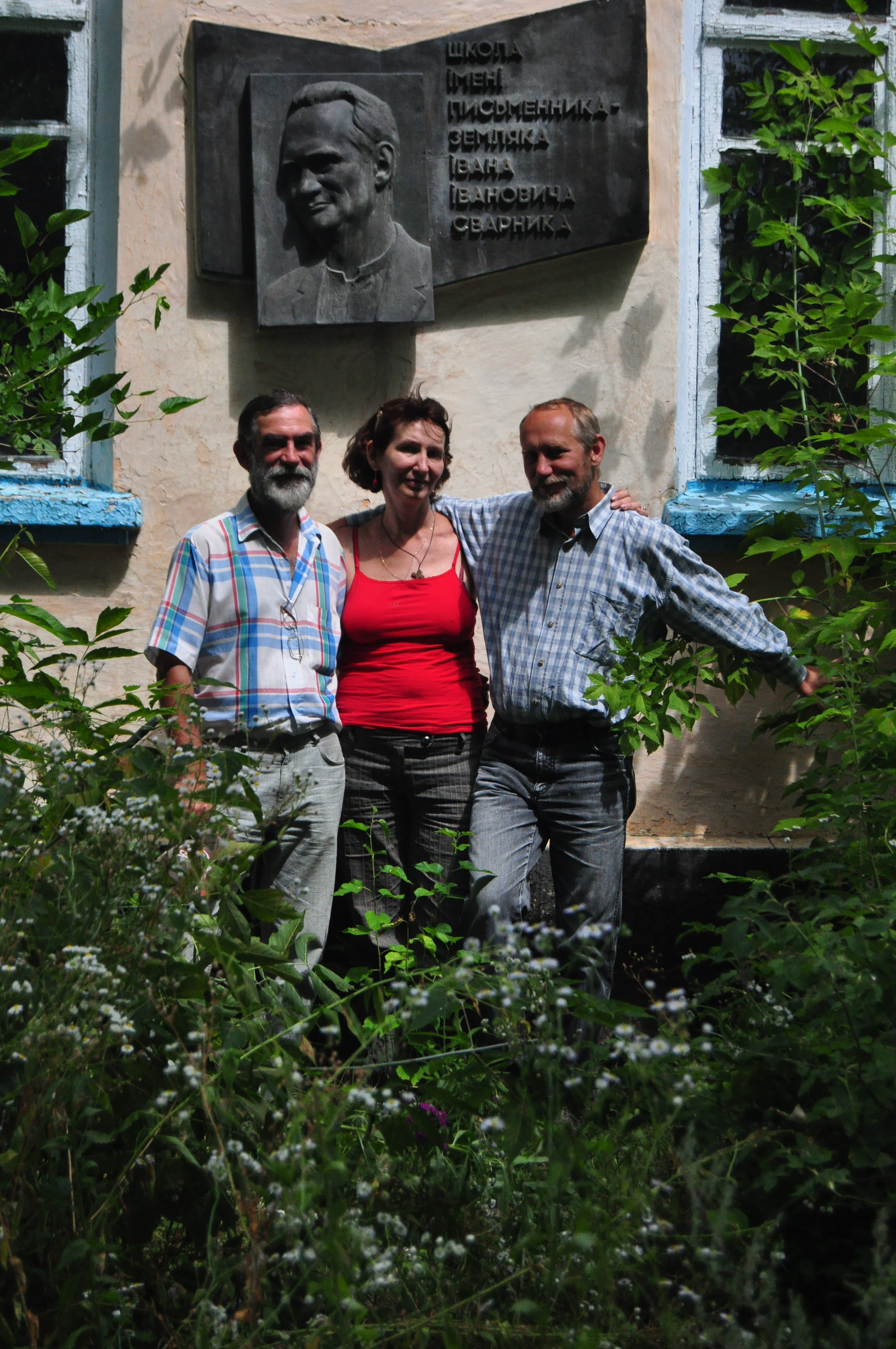
Bas-relief portrait of Ivan Svarnyk on the wall of the school in Lysohirka village and his children Ivan, Halyna and Mykola Swarnyk

Mykola Swarnyk (Ukrainian: Микола Сварник, born 23 February 1957, Lutsk, Volyn Oblast) is a Ukrainian photographer, Wikipedian, and public figure. Candidate of Biological Sciences (1989).

== Biography ==
He graduated from Lviv Secondary School No. 28 (1974) and Lviv Forestry Institute (1979). He worked as an engineer, a junior researcher at the Institute of Carpathian Ecology of the National Academy of Sciences of Ukraine (1979-1994), a lecturer at the Department of Physical Rehabilitation at the Lviv State Institute of Physical Culture (1996-2000), a lecturer in medical and social rehabilitation at the Lviv Medical College (1998-2000); a lecturer (2000-2002), associate professor (2002-2013) at the Department of Sociology and Social Work at Lviv Polytechnic National University.

He currently lives in Toronto, Canada, where, after retiring, he became a freelance photographer for the Ukrainian community. He also volunteers and edits Wikipedia.

=== Public activities ===
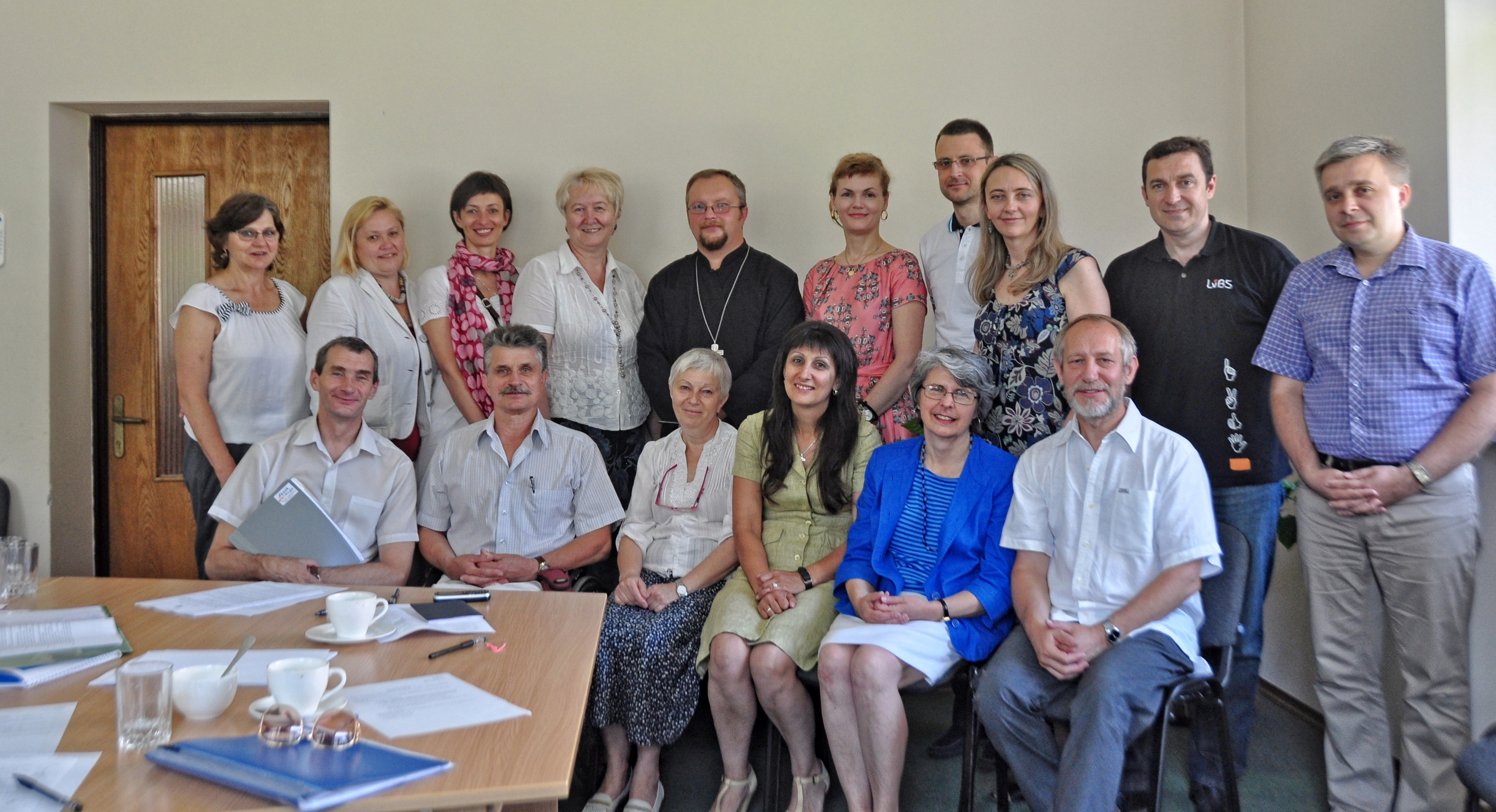
The newly formed supervisory board of the Dzherelo Training and Rehabilitation Center in Lviv, June 2013.

He was the chairman of the "Nadiya" society (1992-1996), co-founder of the "Dzherelo" Training and Rehabilitation Center (since 1994), member of the Board of Education of the city of Lviv (2000-2005) and the board of the "Step by Step" Foundation (1999-2012); chairman of the Board of the Coalition for the Protection of Disabled and Intellectually Disabled Persons (2004-2013); corresponding member of the National Academy of Sciences of Canada (2018); member of the board of the Ukrainian Canadian Social Service, Toronto Division (2014-2019).

As a member of the "Our Ukraine" party, he ran for the Verkhovna Rada of Ukraine in the 1998 elections. He was a member of the Reform and Order party.

Member of the Lviv City Council (2006-2010) from the Yulia Tymoshenko Bloc faction. Member of the Standing Committee on Medicine, Education, Science and Social Protection.

Participated in:

- in the publication of the first edition of the "Postup" newspaper;
- in the working groups of the Verkhovna Rada of Ukraine on draft laws on disability and education.

Member of the jury and organizing committees of the photo contests "Wiki Loves Earth" and "Wiki Loves Monuments" (2016, 2018).

=== Scientific activity ===
Author, co-author of about 80 scientific and popular science works, 10 manuals, collections and guidelines.

Selected publications:

- Доступність до об'єктів житлового та громадського призначення для людей з особливими потребами (2004, coauthor)
- Активний відпочинок та туризм для неповносправних (2005, coauthor)
- Реабілітаційний супровід навчання неповносправних дітей (2008, coauthor)
- Сільський відпочинок для неповносправних (2011, coauthor)

Research interests: population ecology of natural and anthropogenically modified ecosystems of the highlands of the Ukrainian Carpathians (structure and dynamics); rehabilitation, inclusive education, human rights, methodological and organizational support of social services for children and adults with disabilities; work with parents of children with special needs; methods of training in physical rehabilitation and social work; motivation of volunteers in the public sector.

== Awards ==
- Order of Merit, 3rd class (1 December 2006)
