= Norway in the Eurovision Song Contest 2017 =

- Eurovision Song Contest 2017
- Participating broadcaster: Norsk rikskringkasting (NRK)
- Country: Norway
- Selection process: Melodi Grand Prix 2017
- Selection date: 11 March 2017

Competing entry
- Song: "Grab the Moment"
- Artist: Jowst (Note: "Grab the Moment" features unaccredited vocals from Norwegian singer Aleksander Walmann.)
- Songwriters: Joakim With Steen; Jonas McDonnell

Placement
- Semi-final result: Qualified (5th, 187 points)
- Final result: 10th, 158 points

Participation chronology

Norway was represented at the Eurovision Song Contest 2017 with the song "Grab the Moment" written by Joakim With Steen and Jonas McDonnell. The song was performed by Jowst, which is the artistic name of music producer Joakim With Steen, with unaccredited vocals from Aleksander Walmann. The Norwegian broadcaster Norsk rikskringkasting (NRK) organised the national final Melodi Grand Prix 2017 in order to select the Norwegian entry for the 2017 contest in Kyiv, Ukraine. Ten entries competed in a show that took place on 11 March 2017 and the winner was determined over two rounds of voting. In the first round of voting, the combination of votes from ten international jury groups and a public televote selected the top four entries to advance to the competition's second round—the Gold Final. In the second round of voting, a public televote exclusively selected "Grab the Moment" performed by Jowst as the winner with 46,064 votes.

Norway was drawn to compete in the second semi-final of the Eurovision Song Contest which took place on 11 May 2017. Performing during the show in position 12, "Grab the Moment" was announced among the top 10 entries of the second semi-final and therefore qualified to compete in the final on 13 May. It was later revealed that Norway placed fifth out of the 18 participating countries in the semi-final with 187 points. In the final, Norway performed in position 17 and placed tenth out of the 26 participating countries with 158 points.

== Background ==
Prior to the 2017 contest, Norway had participated in the Eurovision Song Contest 55 times since their first entry in 1960. Norway had won the contest on three occasions: in 1985 with the song "La det swinge" performed by Bobbysocks!, in 1995 with the song "Nocturne" performed by Secret Garden, and in 2009 with the song "Fairytale" performed by Alexander Rybak. Norway also had the two dubious distinctions of having finished last in the Eurovision final more than any other country and for having the most "nul points" (zero points) in the contest, the latter being a record the nation shared together with Austria. The country had finished last eleven times and had failed to score a point during four contests. Following the introduction of semi-finals for the 2004, Norway has finished in the top ten six times, including their 2015 entry "A Monster Like Me" performed by Mørland and Debrah Scarlett.

The Norwegian national broadcaster, Norsk rikskringkasting (NRK), broadcasts the event within Norway and organises the selection process for the nation's entry. NRK confirmed their intentions to participate at the 2017 Eurovision Song Contest on 16 May 2016. The broadcaster has traditionally organised the national final Melodi Grand Prix, which has selected the Norwegian entry for the Eurovision Song Contest in all but one of their participation. On 9 June 2016, NRK revealed details regarding their selection procedure and announced the organization of Melodi Grand Prix 2017 in order to select the 2017 Norwegian entry.

== Before Eurovision ==
=== Melodi Grand Prix 2017 ===
Melodi Grand Prix 2017 was the 55th edition of the Norwegian national final Melodi Grand Prix and selected Norway's entry for the Eurovision Song Contest 2017. The show took place on 11 March 2017 at the Oslo Spektrum in Oslo, hosted by Kåre Magnus Bergh and Line Elvsåshagen. The show was televised on NRK1, NRK TV, broadcast via radio with commentary by Ole Christian Øen on NRK P1 as well as streamed online at NRK's official website nrk.no. The national final was watched by 1.155 million viewers in Norway with a market share of 73%.

==== Competing entries ====
A submission period was opened by NRK between 9 June 2016 and 11 September 2016. Songwriters of any nationality were allowed to submit entries, while performers of the selected songs would be chosen by NRK in consultation with the songwriters. In addition to the public call for submissions, NRK reserved the right to directly invite certain artists and composers to compete. At the close of the deadline, a record-breaking 1,035 submissions were received. Ten songs were selected for the competition and the competing acts and songs were revealed on 7 February 2017 during a press conference at NRK studios, presented by Kåre Magnus Bergh, Line Elvsåshagen and Jan Fredrik Karlsen and broadcast via NRK1 and online at mgp.no. Among the competing artists was former Norwegian Eurovision Song Contest entrant Åge Sten Nilsen (lead singer of Ammunition) who represented the country in 2005 as part of the band Wig Wam. 10-second clips of the competing entries were released during the press conference, while the songs in their entirety were premiered on 15 February.

==== Final ====
Ten songs competed during the final on 11 March 2017. The winner was selected over two rounds of voting. In the first round, the top four entries were selected by a 50/50 combination of votes from ten international juries and a public televote to proceed to the second round, the Gold Final. The viewers and the juries each had a total of 580 points to award. Each jury group distributed their points as follows: 1–8, 10 and 12 points, and only the 12 points of each jury were announced during the show. The viewer vote was based on the percentage of votes each song achieved. For example, if a song gained 10% of the viewer vote, then that entry would be awarded 10% of 580 points rounded to the nearest integer: 58 points. In the Gold Final, public televoting solely selected "Grab the Moment" performed by Jowst as the winner with 46,064 votes. In addition to the performances of the competing entries, the show was opened with Reidun Sæther and Staysman performing the song "Syng for Norge, Sing for Europe", while the interval act featured two-time Irish Eurovision winner Johnny Logan performing his 1987 entry "Hold Me Now" and 2016 Norwegian Eurovision entrant Agnete performing her entry "Icebreaker".

Final – 11 March 2017
R/O	Artist	Song	Songwriter(s)	Result
1	Ulrikke	"Places"	Ulrikke Brandstorp, Tony Alexander Skjevik	Advanced
2	Jenny Augusta	"I Go Where You Go"	Jenny Augusta Enge, Inga Þyri Þórðardóttir	—N/a
3	Rune Rudberg Band	"Run Run Away"	Peter Danielson, Åsa Larsson, Mats Larsson	—N/a
4	Jowst	"Grab the Moment"	Joakim With Steen, Jonas McDonnell	Advanced
5	Kristian Valen	"You & I"	Kristian Valen	—N/a
6	In Fusion	"Nothing Ever Knocked Us Over"	Gustav Eurén, Danne Attlerud, Niklas Arn, Ulrik Eurén, Cissi Kallin	—N/a
7	Amina Sewali	"Mesterverk"	Amina Sewali	—N/a
8	Ammunition	"Wrecking Crew"	Åge Sten Nilsen, Erik Mårtensson	Advanced
9	Elin and the Woods	"First Step in Faith (Oadjebasvuhtii)"	Robin Lynch, Elin Kåven	Advanced
10	Ella	"Mama's Boy"	Per Kristian Ottestad, Ida Maria	—N/a

Detailed International Jury Votes
R/O	Song	Ireland	Armenia	Finland	Sweden	Israel	Germany	Austria	Hungary	Malta	United Kingdom
R/O	Song	Ireland	Armenia	Finland	Sweden	Israel	Germany	Austria	Hungary	Malta	United Kingdom
1	"Places"	X	X				X				
2	"I Go Where You Go"										
3	"Run Run Away"										
4	"Grab the Moment"				X	X			X	X	
5	"You & I"										
6	"Nothing Ever Knocked Us Over"										
7	"Mesterverk"										
8	"Wrecking Crew"			X				X			
9	"First Step in Faith (Oadjebasvuhtii)"										
10	"Mama's Boy"										X
International Jury Spokespersons
Ireland: Johnny Logan; Armenia: David Tserunyan; Finland: Terhi Norvasto; Sweden: ?; Israel: Alon Amir; Germany: Carola Conze; Austria: ?; Hungary: Gábor Alfréd Fehérvári; Malta: ?; United Kingdom: William Lee Adams

Gold Final – 11 March 2017
R/O	Artist	Song	Televote	Place
1	Jowst	"Grab the Moment"	46,064	1
2	Ulrikke	"Places"	12,662	4
3	Elin and the Woods	"First Step in Faith (Oadjebasvuhtii)"	28,591	3
4	Ammunition	"Wrecking Crew"	40,128	2

=== Promotion ===
Jowst made several appearances across Europe to specifically promote "Grab the Moment" as the Norwegian Eurovision entry. On 25 March, Jowst performed during the Eurovision PreParty Riga, which was organised by OGAE Latvia and held at the Crystal Club Concert Hall in Riga. On 2 April, Jowst performed during the London Eurovision Party, which was held at the Café de Paris venue in London, United Kingdom and hosted by Nicki French and Paddy O'Connell. Between 3 and 6 April, Jowst took part in promotional activities in Tel Aviv, Israel where she performed during the Israel Calling event held at the Ha'teatron venue. On 8 April, Jowst performed during the Eurovision in Concert event which was held at the Melkweg venue in Amsterdam, Netherlands and hosted by Cornald Maas and Selma Björnsdóttir.

== At Eurovision ==
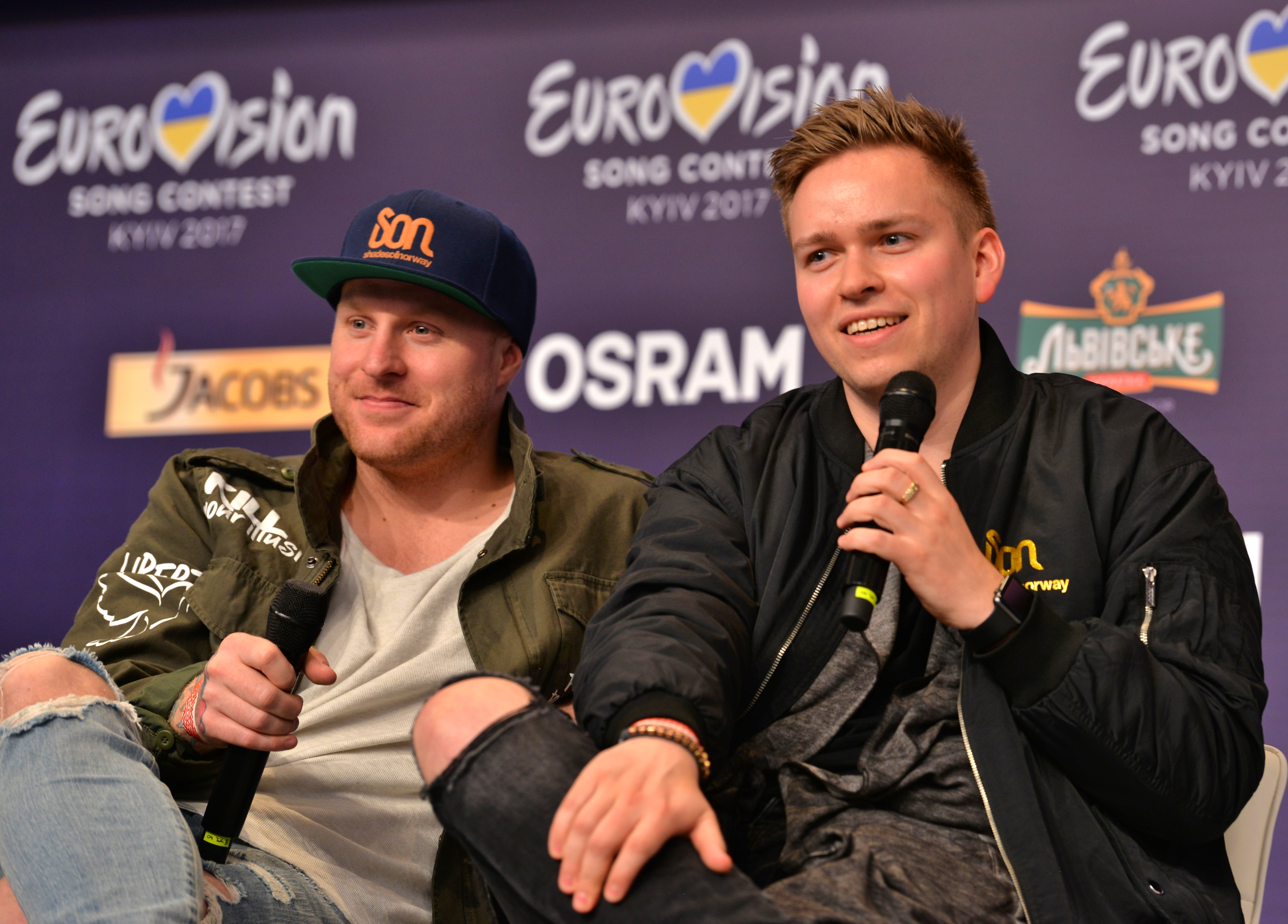
Jowst (right) and Aleksander Walmann during a press meet and greet

According to Eurovision rules, all nations with the exceptions of the host country and the "Big Five" (France, Germany, Italy, Spain and the United Kingdom) are required to qualify from one of two semi-finals in order to compete for the final; the top ten countries from each semi-final progress to the final. The European Broadcasting Union (EBU) split up the competing countries into six different pots based on voting patterns from previous contests, with countries with favourable voting histories put into the same pot. On 31 January 2017, an allocation draw was held which placed each country into one of the two semi-finals, as well as which half of the show they would perform in. Norway was placed into the second semi-final, to be held on 11 May 2017, and was scheduled to perform in the second half of the show.

Once all the competing songs for the 2017 contest had been released, the running order for the semi-finals was decided by the shows' producers rather than through another draw, so that similar songs were not placed next to each other. Norway was set to perform in position 12, following the entry from Croatia and before the entry from Switzerland. However, following Russia's withdrawal from the contest on 13 April and subsequent removal from the running order of the second semi-final, Norway's performing position shifted to 12.

In Norway, the two semi-finals and the final were broadcast on NRK1 with commentary by Olav Viksmo-Slettan. An alternative broadcast of the final was also televised on NRK3 with commentary by the hosts of the NRK P3 radio show P3morgen Ronny Brede Aase, Silje Reiten Nordnes and Markus Ekrem Neby. The second semi-final and final were also broadcast via radio on NRK P1 with commentary by Ole Christian Øen. NRK1 Tegnspråk broadcast the three shows interpreted in International Sign for the deaf and sign language users. The Norwegian spokespersons, which announced the top 12-point score awarded by the Norwegian jury during the final, were Marcus and Martinus.

=== Semi-final ===
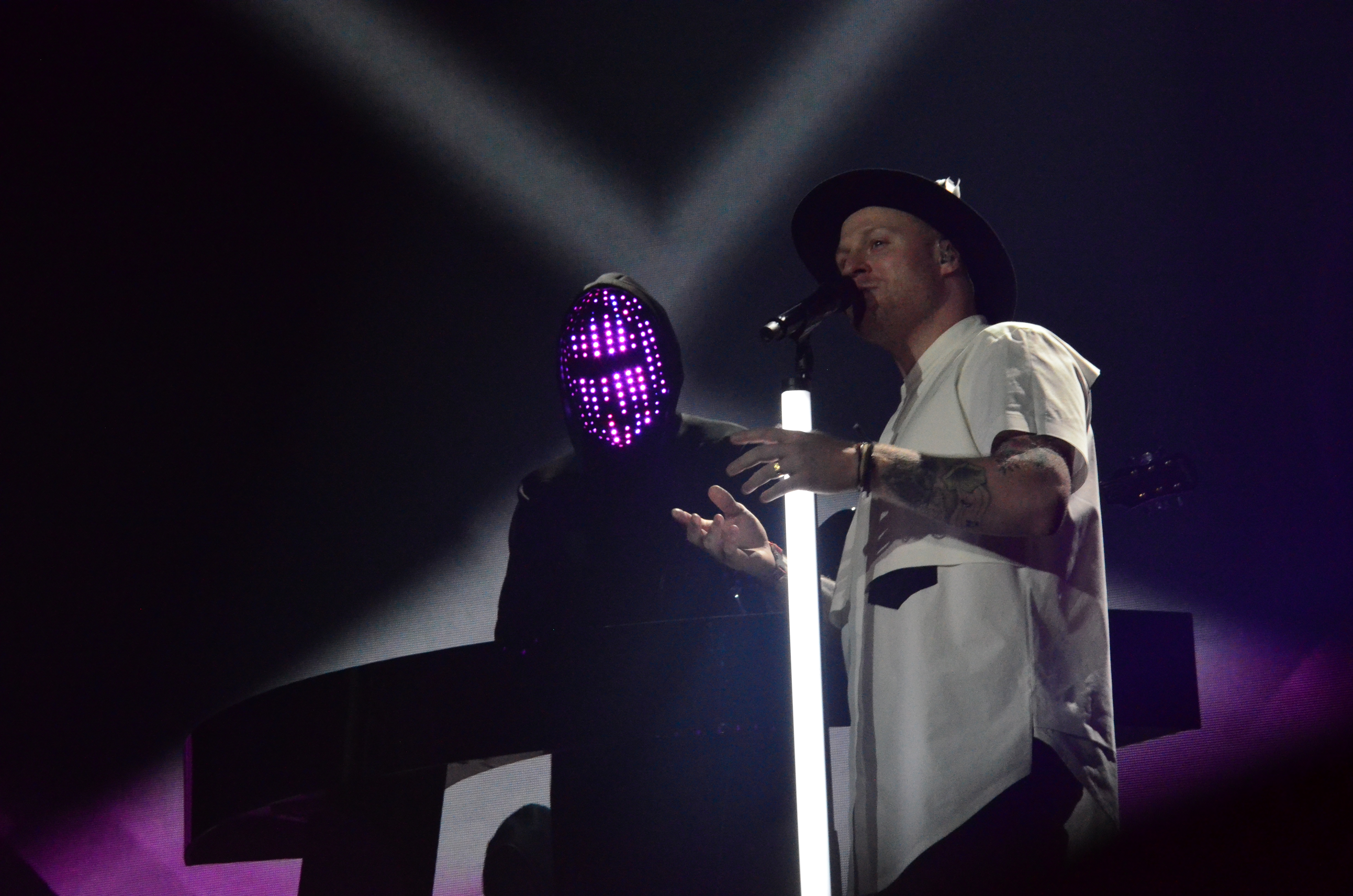
Jowst and Aleksander Walmann during a press meet and greet

Jowst and Aleksander Walmann took part in technical rehearsals on 3 and 6 May, followed by dress rehearsals on 10 and 11 May. This included the jury show on 10 May where the professional juries of each country watched and voted on the competing entries.

The Norwegian performance featured Jowst and Aleksander Walmann performing on stage together with two DJs. Walmann appeared in front of the stage with a light-up microphone stand in a longline white shirt and black trousers, while the remaining performers were behind mixing desks in black outfits and light-up masks. The LED screens displayed pink, black and white patterns, and the post-chorus also featured holograms of Walmann. The two DJs on stage with Jowst and Aleksander Walmann were Ole Børud and Ole-André Enggrav. The performers were also joined by two off-stage backing vocalists: Adrian Jørgensen and Frode Vassel.

At the end of the show, Norway was announced as having finished in the top 10 and subsequently qualifying for the grand final. It was later revealed that Norway placed fifth in the semi-final, receiving a total of 189 points: 52 points from the televoting and 137 points from the juries.

=== Final ===
Shortly after the second semi-final, a winners' press conference was held for the ten qualifying countries. As part of this press conference, the qualifying artists took part in a draw to determine which half of the grand final they would subsequently participate in. This draw was done in the reverse order the countries appeared in the semi-final running order. Norway was drawn to compete in the second half. Following this draw, the shows' producers decided upon the running order of the final, as they had done for the semi-finals. Norway was subsequently placed to perform in position 17, following the entry from Spain and before the entry from the United Kingdom.

Jowst and Aleksander Walmann once again took part in dress rehearsals on 12 and 13 May before the final, including the jury final where the professional juries cast their final votes before the live show. The artists performed a repeat of their semi-final performance during the final on 14 May. Norway placed tenth in the final, scoring 158 points: 29 points from the televoting and 129 points from the juries.

=== Voting ===
Voting during the three shows involved each country awarding two sets of points from 1-8, 10 and 12: one from their professional jury and the other from televoting. Each nation's jury consisted of five music industry professionals who are citizens of the country they represent, with their names published before the contest to ensure transparency. This jury judged each entry based on: vocal capacity; the stage performance; the song's composition and originality; and the overall impression by the act. In addition, no member of a national jury was permitted to be related in any way to any of the competing acts in such a way that they cannot vote impartially and independently. The individual rankings of each jury member as well as the nation's televoting results were released shortly after the grand final.

Below is a breakdown of points awarded to Norway and awarded by Norway in the second semi-final and grand final of the contest, and the breakdown of the jury voting and televoting conducted during the two shows:

==== Points awarded to Norway ====
Points awarded to Norway (Semi-final 2)
Score	Televote	Jury
12 points		Denmark; Germany; Lithuania
10 points	Denmark	Belarus; Estonia; Israel; San Marino; Switzerland; Ukraine
8 points		
7 points	Lithuania	Hungary; Ireland; Netherlands
6 points	Belarus	
5 points	Hungary; Netherlands	Austria; Bulgaria
4 points	Ukraine	Croatia
3 points	Bulgaria; Estonia; Serbia	France
2 points	Germany; Ireland; Romania	Romania
1 point		Serbia

Points awarded to Norway (Final)
Score	Televote	Jury
12 points		Germany
10 points		Estonia; Lithuania; San Marino
8 points		
7 points	Denmark	Belgium; France; Georgia; Latvia; Netherlands
6 points	Lithuania; Sweden	Belarus; Denmark; Hungary
5 points	Belarus	Armenia; Israel; Switzerland
4 points		
3 points		Austria; Italy; Poland
2 points	Finland	Croatia; Ireland; Macedonia; Portugal
1 point	Iceland; Latvia; Ukraine	Finland; Iceland

==== Points awarded by Norway ====
Points awarded by Norway (Semi-final 2)
Score	Televote	Jury
12 points	Bulgaria	Bulgaria
10 points	Lithuania	Denmark
8 points	Romania	Netherlands
7 points	Israel	Israel
6 points	Hungary	Serbia
5 points	Estonia	Switzerland
4 points	Denmark	Austria
3 points	Netherlands	Macedonia
2 points	Ireland	Hungary
1 point	Croatia	Croatia

Points awarded by Norway (Final)
Score	Televote	Jury
12 points	Portugal	Bulgaria
10 points	Romania	Portugal
8 points	Bulgaria	Denmark
7 points	Belgium	Italy
6 points	Moldova	Sweden
5 points	Sweden	Israel
4 points	Hungary	Netherlands
3 points	Poland	Australia
2 points	Italy	Moldova
1 point	Croatia	United Kingdom

==== Detailed voting results ====
The following members comprised the Norwegian jury:

- Erland Bakke (jury chairperson) – artist manager and CEO
- Karsten Marcussen (Big Daddy Karsten) – rapper
- Dean Andersen (DivaDean) – drag artist, member of the Great Garlic Girls
- Janne Tveit – editor
- Anne-Karine Strøm – singer, represented Norway in the 1973 contest as member of the Bendik Singers and in the 1974 and 1976 contests as a solo artist

Former Head of Delegation Per Sundnes was initially announced as a member of the Norwegian jury, but he was removed after making disparaging comments about the Irish entry, which violates the EBU's rule that no jurors can disclose their opinion on the competing entries prior to the contest.

Detailed voting results from Norway (Semi-final 2)
R/O	Country	Jury							Televote	
R/O	Country	Big Daddy Karsten	DivaDean	J. Monsen-Tveit	A.K. Strøm	E. Bakke	Rank	Points	Rank	Points
01	Serbia	5	5	1	5	8	5	6	12	
02	Austria	8	6	11	6	6	7	4	13	
03	Macedonia	7	15	3	11	11	8	3	14	
04	Malta	10	13	15	16	14	15		16	
05	Romania	16	7	5	17	10	12		3	8
06	Netherlands	3	3	4	4	7	3	8	8	3
07	Hungary	12	10	14	7	4	9	2	5	6
08	Denmark	1	4	7	3	3	2	10	7	4
09	Ireland	13	16	16	13	16	16		9	2
10	San Marino	17	17	17	14	17	17		17	
11	Croatia	4	11	9	12	12	10	1	10	1
12	Norway									
13	Switzerland	9	8	6	8	5	6	5	15	
14	Belarus	6	9	10	15	9	11		11	
15	Bulgaria	2	2	2	1	1	1	12	1	12
16	Lithuania	15	12	12	10	13	13		2	10
17	Estonia	14	14	13	9	15	14		6	5
18	Israel	11	1	8	2	2	4	7	4	7

Detailed voting results from Norway (Final)
R/O	Country	Jury							Televote	
R/O	Country	Big Daddy Karsten	DivaDean	J. Monsen-Tveit	A.K. Strøm	E. Bakke	Rank	Points	Rank	Points
01	Israel	14	4	9	6	4	6	5	12	
02	Poland	8	16	23	18	16	18		8	3
03	Belarus	21	22	15	21	14	20		19	
04	Austria	17	12	21	16	17	19		17	
05	Armenia	13	18	20	13	15	17		21	
06	Netherlands	5	7	8	9	9	7	4	13	
07	Moldova	11	8	5	24	8	9	2	5	6
08	Hungary	22	15	12	7	11	11		7	4
09	Italy	9	2	7	2	2	4	7	9	2
10	Denmark	3	5	4	5	3	3	8	15	
11	Portugal	4	1	11	1	1	2	10	1	12
12	Azerbaijan	10	21	19	8	12	13		24	
13	Croatia	23	24	24	22	24	24		10	1
14	Australia	6	9	6	12	13	8	3	11	
15	Greece	12	13	16	10	22	16		20	
16	Spain	25	20	25	23	25	25		22	
17	Norway									
18	United Kingdom	2	11	13	11	19	10	1	18	
19	Cyprus	16	17	22	20	23	22		14	
20	Romania	24	10	14	14	10	15		2	10
21	Germany	20	23	17	25	21	23		25	
22	Ukraine	18	25	18	15	20	21		23	
23	Belgium	15	14	2	19	18	12		4	7
24	Sweden	7	6	3	3	5	5	6	6	5
25	Bulgaria	1	3	1	4	7	1	12	3	8
26	France	19	19	10	17	6	14		16	
