= Grab the Moment =

2017 single by JOWST

Single by JOWST
- Released: 15 February 2017
- Recorded: 2016
- Genre: EDM; Electropop
- Length: 2:55
- Label: Three15 Records
- Songwriters: Joakim With Steen; Jonas McDonnell
- Producer: Joakim With Steen

JOWST singles chronology
"Grab the Moment" (2017)	"ThatFeeling" (2017)

Eurovision Song Contest 2017 entry
- Country: Norway
- Artist: Joakim With Steen
- As: JOWST
- With: Aleksander Walmann
- Language: English
- Composers: Joakim With Steen; Jonas McDonnell
- Lyricists: Joakim With Steen; Jonas McDonnell

Finals performance
- Semi-final result: 5th
- Semi-final points: 189
- Final result: 10th
- Final points: 158

Entry chronology
- ◄ "Icebreaker" (2016)
- "That's How You Write a Song" (2018) ►

"Grab the Moment" is a song by Norwegian music producer JOWST featuring uncredited vocals from Norwegian singer Aleksander Walmann. The song represented Norway in the Eurovision Song Contest 2017. It was released as a digital download on 15 February 2017, and was written by Jonas McDonnell and Joakim With Steen.

== Background ==
The song was not originally written for Eurovision. It was originally work titled "Making a Hit" and lyricist Jonas McDonnell had written a rap to the song. During the work on the song, composer Joakim With Steen invited musically interested friends and acquaintances to a closed Facebook group, JOWST - making a hit. In the group, he asked friends for advice and suggestions to make the song better, and he changed the song as the feedback came in. Altogether he got in around 100 suggestions, divided into 22 different sketches and drafts.

Finally Steen ended up with "Grab the Moment", and he then sent it to several record companies without receiving a response. Mostly for the fun, he also sent the song to NRK, which in January 2017 took it out to participate in Eurovision 2017. Steen considered first to decline participation, but later decided to participate.

Then began the search for a vocalist, and two different vocalists tried to sing the song. One of them was Aleksander Walmann, who had come to the final of TV2's The Voice in 2012. Steen chose Walmann because they two had the best chemistry together.

== Reception and lyrics ==
The song received positive criticism from the Norwegian reviewers after the victory, and it was described as "contemporary". Verdens Gang reviewer Stein Østbø felt "Grab the Moment" has "a hell of a sticky feel-good chorus" and stated simultaneously: "No, I do not think we [will] win in Kyiv with this. But it is a good placement". Aftenposten said the song was the best in the competition and that it had "modern rhythms, cool chorus, good vocals". Dagbladet agreed, and thought Norway would get far in the Eurovision Song Contest in Kyiv: "It's catchy, modern, and apparently has a European appeal", wrote reviewer Anders Grønneberg after the victory.

The day after the victory "Grab the Moment" also went to the top of the Norwegian iTunes sales chart.

Steen himself describes "Grab the Moment" as an EDM song, but with elements of pop and hip-hop. The text is written by Jonas McDonnell, and is about challenging social anxiety and dare to tread outside your comfort zone.

== Melodi Grand Prix ==
The song was one of 1035 songs which was submitted to NRK competition for Eurovision 2017, and was among the ten who were selected to participate in the final in Oslo Spektrum, Saturday 11 March.

The song was the fourth entry on the scene, with Aleksander Walmann as vocalist, while Joakim With Steen stood on the stage as a DJ, wearing a lightmask. Steen attended the artist name, JOWST, which is an acronym of the initials of his name. In the first round "Grab the Moment" got the most Summit Points from the international juries, and it was one of four songs that advanced to the gold final. Eventually "Grab the Moment" was named the winner after receiving the most SMS votes from Norwegian viewers in the gold final. The song received 46,064 SMS votes, around 6,000 more than second place Ammunition.

"Grab the Moment" thus represented Norway in the second semi-final of the Eurovision Song Contest in Kyiv on 11 May 2017.

== Eurovision Song Contest ==
JOWST and Walmann were confirmed to be taking part in Melodi Grand Prix 2017, Norway's national selection for the Eurovision Song Contest 2017, on 7 February 2017. In the final, held on 11 March, JOWST and Walmann received the maximum 12 points from four of the eleven international juries in addition to winning the televote. They subsequently advanced to the gold final, where they won the competition. Norway competed in the second semi-final of the Eurovision Song Contest on 11 May 2017, qualifying for the grand final in 5th position after their jury result of 3rd and televote result of 8th were combined. JOWST performed 17th at the grand final on May 13, 2017, finishing in 10th position, receiving a combined total of 158 points from the jury vote and televote.

== Track listing ==
Digital download
No.	Title	Length
1.	"Grab the Moment"	2:55

Digital download
No.	Title	Length
1.	"Grab the Moment" (Karaoke version)	2:56

== Charts ==
Chart (2017)	Peak position
Austria (Ö3 Austria Top 40)	73
Hungary (Single Top 40)	30
Norway (VG-lista)	6
Netherlands (Dutch Single Tip)	24
Sweden (Sverigetopplistan)	56

== Certifications ==
Region	Certification	Certified units/sales
Norway (IFPI Norway)	2× Platinum	80,000^{‡}
^{‡} Sales+streaming figures based on certification alone.

== Release history ==
Region	Date	Format	Label
Worldwide	15 February 2017	Digital download	Three15 Records

== Certifications ==
Region	Certification	Certified units/sales
Norway (IFPI Norway)	2× Platinum	80,000^{‡}
^{‡} Sales+streaming figures based on certification alone.
