= Jowst =

Norwegian music producer (born 1989)

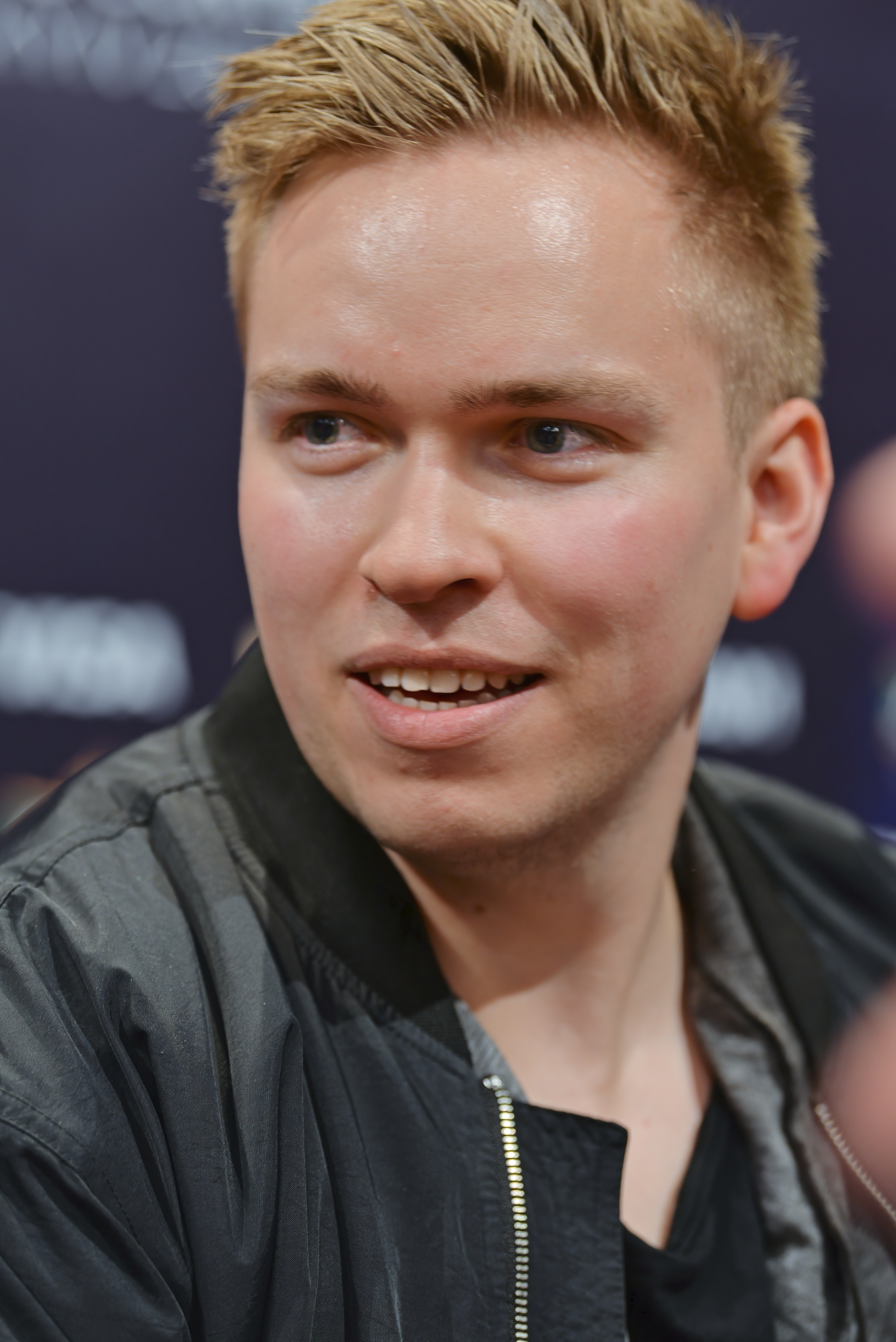
- Steen at the Eurovision Song Contest 2017 Press Meet&Greet

Background information
- Born: Joakim With Steen; 26 June 1989 (age 37); Trondheim, Norway
- Origin: Kolbotn, Norway
- Genres: EDM; punk rock
- Occupations: Music producer; songwriter; sound engineer; audio mixer; teacher
- Instruments: Synthesizer; guitar; drum
- Years active: 2011–present
- Labels: Three15 Records; Red Line Records
- Website: jowstmusic.com

Joakim With Steen (born 26 June 1989), better known as Jowst (stylised in all caps), is a Norwegian music producer and songwriter. He represented Norway in the Eurovision Song Contest 2017 alongside vocalist Aleksander Walmann with the song "Grab the Moment", finishing in 10th place.

== Early life and career ==
Steen was born in Trondheim and raised in Tiller. At age 14, his family moved to Steinkjer Municipality. At the age of fifteen his main focus was guitar, punk, songwriting and band. After finishing his sound and music production education at the renowned Noroff Institute in Oslo, where he later also worked as a teacher and held lectures in the same field. At the same time he also worked as sound technician and producer for Earport Studios in Fornebu. Joakim started Red Line Studio where he has worked as a sound engineer and producer since 2011. With the project "Making a Hit" and the hit song "Grab the Moment" he is now focusing on his own music under the artist name JOWST, an acronym formed from the first letter of his names.

Steen and Norwegian singer Aleksander Walmann were confirmed to be taking part in Melodi Grand Prix 2017, Norway's national selection for the Eurovision Song Contest 2017, on 7 February 2017. In the final, held on 11 March, JOWST and Walmann received the maximum 12 points from four of the eleven international juries in addition to winning the televote. They subsequently advanced to the gold final, where they won the competition. Norway competed in the second half of the second semi-final at the Eurovision Song Contest, and they managed to advance to the final. In the final, they placed 10th out of 26th.

Steen also co-wrote Walmann's song for Melodi Grand Prix 2018 "Talk To The Hand", which progressed to the Gold Final, but failed to progress to the final two, coming fourth in the televote.

In October 2022, Steen along with Byron Williams Jr. was announced as one of the 21 competitors for Melodi Grand Prix 2023 with the song "Freaky for the Weekend". They were placed into the 1st semi-final, performing last (7th). They failed to qualify for the finals.

== Personal life ==
Joakim is cohabiting with Rita Rybakova, and together they have a daughter Sofia born in 2017.

== Discography ==
=== Singles ===
As lead artist

Title	Year	Peak chart positions				Album
Title	Year	NOR	AUT	NLD Tip	SWE	Album
"Grab the Moment"	2017	6	73	24	56	Non-album singles
"ThatFeeling" (featuring Aleksander Walmann)	2017	—	—	—	—	Non-album singles
"Burning Bridges" (with Kristian Kostov)	2018	—	—	—	—	Non-album singles
"Roller Coaster Ride" (with Manel Navarro and Maria Celin)	2018	—	—	—	—	Non-album singles
"Everybody Knows…"	2019	—	—	—	—	Non-album singles
"Happier" (featuring Chris Medina)	2019	—	—	—	—	Non-album singles
"Into the Wild" (with Aleksander Walmann)	2020	—	—	—	—	Non-album singles
"Barely Breathing" (with Agnete featuring Azzip)	2021	—	—	—	—	Non-album singles
"The Sweetest Fruit" (with Augustine Dunn & Barbara Schoblocher)	2024	—	—	—	—	Non-album singles
"—" denotes a single that did not chart or was not released

Promotional singles

Title	Year	Album
"Thinking Through Thorough Thoughts"	2016	Non-album single

=== Remixes ===
Title	Year	Original artist
"Let Me Love You" (Jowst Remix)	2016	DJ Snake (featuring Justin Bieber)
"We Are Dreamers" (co-producer)	2017	Frida Sundemo
"Night Train" (Jowst Remix)	2017	CLMD (featuring Alida)
"Silvertongue" (Jowst Remix)	2017	Young The Giant
"Keep On Falling" (Jowst Remix)	2017	Manel Navarro
"My Turn" (Jowst Remix)	2017	Martina Bárta
"Good Vibes" (JOWST and Ambros Remix)	2018	Nathan Trent

=== Production credits ===
Title	Year	Main artist	Role
Credited as Joakim With Steen, Joakim W Steen, Joakim Steen, Jowst or Red Line Studio
"Mirage"	2012	Heyerdahl	Music producer
c. 18 other songs	2015-2017	TBA	Music producer
"Drama"	2017	Karin Melón	Music producer
"Forever or Never"	2018	Oda	Music producer
"Brain vs Heart"	2019	Oda	Music producer

Preceded by Agnete with "Icebreaker"	Norway in the Eurovision Song Contest; 2017 (with Aleksander Walmann)	Succeeded by Alexander Rybak with "That's How You Write a Song"
