= Aleksander Walmann =

Norwegian singer-songwriter (born 1986)

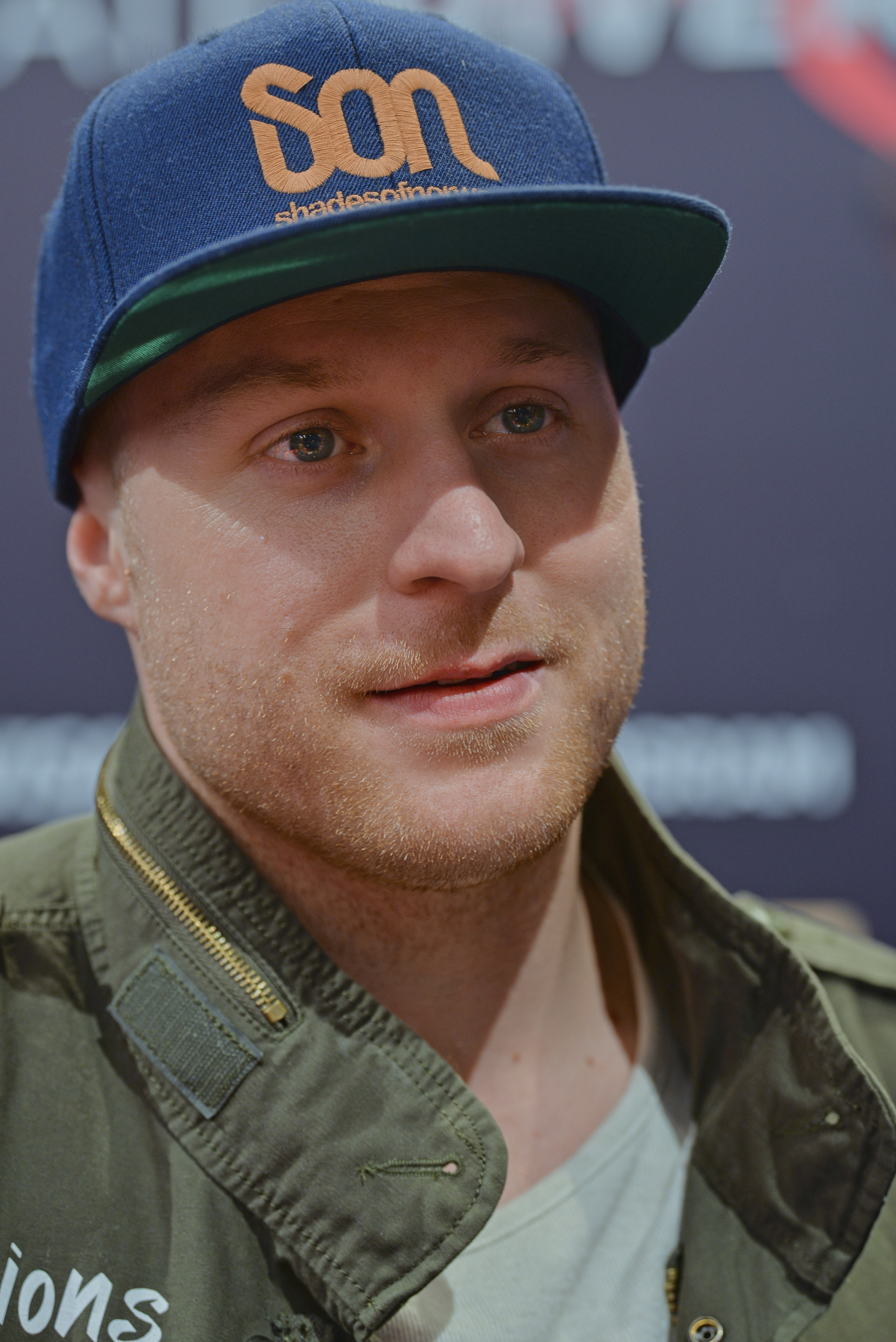
- Walmann at the Eurovision Song Contest 2017 Press Meet&Greet

Background information
- Born: Aleksander Walmann Åsgården; 12 January 1986 (age 40); Porsgrunn, Norway
- Origin: Oslo, Norway
- Genres: Folk; hip hop; electronica; EDM; house
- Occupations: Singer; songwriter; voice actor; snowboarder; social worker
- Instruments: Vocals; guitar
- Years active: 2011–present
- Labels: Universal Music Group; Artistpartner Records; Walmann Records
- Website: aleksanderwalmann.com

Aleksander Walmann Åsgården (born 12 January 1986) is a Norwegian singer and songwriter. He represented Norway in the Eurovision Song Contest 2017 alongside Jowst with the song "Grab the Moment", finishing in 10th place.

== Early life and career ==
Walmann was born in Porsgrunn, and grew up in a musical family through childhood. From the age of 13 and until he started playing music, Aleksander was an active snowboarder at an international level. In 2012, he participated in season one of The Voice – Norges beste stemme, Norway's version of The Voice, where he had Sondre Lerche as his mentor. He went on a shared second place together with Hege Øversveen and Leif Anders Wentzel in the competitions finale, only beaten by winner Martin Halla.

Walmann and Norwegian music producer JOWST were confirmed to be taking part in Melodi Grand Prix 2017, Norway's national selection for the Eurovision Song Contest 2017, on 7 February 2017. In the final, held on 11 March, JOWST and Walmann received the maximum 12 points from four of the eleven international juries in addition to winning the televote. They subsequently advanced to the gold final, where they won the competition. They represented Norway in the Eurovision Song Contest 2017, and competed in the second half of the second semi-final for a place in the final. They succeeded and on 13 May 2017 they received the 10th place in the competition.

On 7 June 2017, NRK announced that Walmann would compete in the sixth season of the Norwegian music TV-competition Stjernekamp.

He competed in Melodi Grand Prix 2018 and attempt to represent Norway in the Eurovision Song Contest 2018 for the second time in a row with the song 'Talk to the Hand', in which he was eliminated in the Silver Final.

== Philanthropy ==
On the night of 23 July 2011, Aleksander wrote his very first song called "Don't Let Go (In This Together)", about the 2011 Norway attacks. "It only took a couple of hours before the song was finished, and was written to process the strong impressions after the events." As of Åsgården's support to the victims, he was among the artists who attended the memorial concert.

One year later on 22 July 2012, Åsgården donated the revenues from his song "Don't Let Go" to the Norwegian Red Cross and Utøyastiftelsen (Utøya Foundation). "It means much to be able to give something. [And] I hope more people will hear the song and help to support. The more I get the better.", he said.

== Discography ==
=== Singles ===
==== As lead artist ====
Title	Year	Album
Credited as Aleksander Walmann Åsgården
"Don't Let Go (In This Together)"	2011	Non-album singles
"Finer Feelings"	2012	Non-album singles
Credited as Aleksander Walmann
"Lio" (with Chim1 and Obi One)	2011	Non-album singles
"Få høre (Yeah)" (with Chim1)	2013	Non-album singles
"Do Something"	2013	Non-album singles
"The Winds Will Change" (featuring Nicolai Herwell)	2013	Non-album singles
"Sweet Moon"	2013	Non-album singles
"Echoes"	2014	Non-album singles
"Day by Day (Life 2016)"	2016	Non-album singles
"Talk to the Hand"	2018	Non-album singles
"Waiting for Your Love"	2018	Non-album singles
"Into the Wild" (with JOWST)	2020	Non-album singles
"5 Minutter" (featuring Agnes Stock)	2021	Non-album singles
"Stay Awake"	2021	Non-album singles
"Hjem"	2022	
"Hvor ble du av"	2023	

==== As featured artist ====
Title	Year	Album
"Magi" (Chim1 featuring Aleksander Walmann)	2012	Non-album singles
"Bitter Tomorrow" (Damien featuring Aleksander Walmann)	2015	Karma Slow But Karma
"Step One" (Sono & Etwas featuring Aleksander Walmann)	2015	Non-album singles
"Broken Wings" (Simon Field with Jamie featuring Aleksander Walmann)	2016	Non-album singles
"Don't Wake Me Up" (Quiet Disorder with Simon Field featuring Aleksander Walmann)	2017	Non-album singles
"ThatFeeling" (JOWST featuring Aleksander Walmann)	2017	Non-album singles

=== Production credits ===
Title	Year	Main artist	Role
"Grab the Moment"	2017	JOWST	Uncredited vocalist

== Filmography ==
=== Dubbing ===
Year	Film	Role	Notes
2014	Rio 2	Roberto	Norwegian voice-dub

Preceded by Agnete with "Icebreaker"	Norway in the Eurovision Song Contest; 2017 (with JOWST)	Succeeded by Alexander Rybak with "That's How You Write a Song"
