= That's How You Write a Song =

2018 song by Alexander Rybak

Single by Alexander Rybak
- Released: 15 January 2018
- Length: 3:00
- Label: Self-released
- Songwriter(s): Alexander Rybak

Alexander Rybak singles chronology
"I Came to Love You" (2016)	"That's How You Write a Song" (2018)	"Mom" (2018)

Music video
- "That's How You Write a Song" on YouTube

Eurovision Song Contest 2018 entry
- Country: Norway
- Artist(s): Alexander Rybak
- Language: English
- Composer(s): Alexander Rybak
- Lyricist(s): Alexander Rybak

Finals performance
- Semi-final result: 1st
- Semi-final points: 266
- Final result: 15th
- Final points: 144

Entry chronology
- ◄ "Grab the Moment" (2017)
- "Spirit in the Sky" (2019) ►

"That's How You Write a Song" is a song written and performed by Belarusian-Norwegian singer Alexander Rybak. It represented Norway in the Eurovision Song Contest 2018 in Lisbon, Portugal. The song was released as a digital download on 15 January 2018.

== Eurovision Song Contest ==
Melodi Grand Prix 2018 was the 56th edition of the Norwegian national final Melodi Grand Prix and it selected Norway's entry for the Eurovision Song Contest 2018. Ten songs were chosen to participate, and the selected singers, entries and composers were revealed on 15 January 2018. The ten songs competed during the final at the Oslo Spektrum on 10 March 2018, hosted by Kåre Magnus Bergh and Silya Nymoen. The four acts who received the most votes from the Norwegian public progressed to the silver final. In the silver final, the two acts who received the most votes from the public progressed to the gold duel. In the gold duel the act who received the most votes from the public was declared the winner. Alexander Rybak won with the song "That's How You Write a Song", receiving 71% of the vote in the Gold Duel. The song competed in the second semi-final of the Eurovision Song Contest 2018, held on 10 May 2018 in Lisbon, Portugal.

== Track listing ==
Digital download
No.	Title	Length
1.	"That's How You Write a Song"	3:00

== Charts ==
Chart (2018)	Peak position
Belgium (Ultratip Bubbling Under Flanders)	29
Norway (VG-lista)	28
Slovakia (Rádio Top 100)	55
Sweden (Sverigetopplistan)	58
UK Singles Downloads (OCC)	100

== Certifications ==
Region	Certification	Certified units/sales
Norway (IFPI Norway)	Platinum	60,000^{‡}
^{‡} Sales+streaming figures based on certification alone.

== Release history ==
Region	Date	Format	Label
Worldwide	15 January 2018	Digital download	Self-released
