= Moldova in the Eurovision Song Contest 2026 =

- Eurovision Song Contest 2026
- Participating broadcaster: TeleRadio-Moldova (TRM)
- Country: Moldova
- Selection process: Finala națională 2026
- Selection date: 17 January 2026

Competing entry
- Song: "Viva, Moldova!"
- Artist: Satoshi
- Songwriter: Andrei Vulpe; Cătălin Temciuc; Vasile Advahov; Vlad Sabajuc

Placement
- Semi-final result: Qualified (4th, 208 points)
- Final result: 8th, 226 points

Participation chronology

Moldova was represented at the Eurovision Song Contest 2026 with the song "Viva, Moldova!", written by Andrei Vulpe, Cătălin Temciuc, Vasile Advahov, and Vlad Sabajuc, and performed by Sabajuc under his stage name Satoshi. The Moldovan participating broadcaster, Teleradio-Moldova (TRM), organised Finala națională 2026 to select its entry for the contest.

== Background ==
Prior to the 2026 contest, Teleradio-Moldova (TRM) had participated in the Eurovision Song Contest representing Moldova nineteen times since its first entry in 2005. Its best placing in the contest was third, achieved in 2017 with the song "Hey, Mamma!" performed by SunStroke Project. To this point, it had achieved a top ten placing at the contest four times: in 2005 when "Boonika bate toba" performed by Zdob și Zdub placed sixth, in 2007 when "Fight" performed by Natalia Barbu placed tenth, in 2018 when "My Lucky Day" performed by DoReDoS also placed tenth, and in 2022 when Zdob și Zdub returned to compete for a third time together with the Advahov Brothers and placed seventh with the song "Trenulețul".

As part of its duties as participating broadcaster, TRM organises the selection of its entry in the Eurovision Song Contest and broadcasts the event in the country. The broadcaster has selected its entry via a national selection show between 2008 and 2020 and since 2023, while it selected its entry in 2021 via an internal selection. TRM was to held a selection show in 2022, but it was ultimately cancelled due to COVID-19 restrictions and it internally selected its entry during the audition round. After withdrawing from the 2025 contest following a "detailed analysis of the current situation, as well as the economic, administrative and artistic challenges", TRM confirmed its intentions to participate at the 2026 contest on 3 November 2025 and announced that it would hold a national selection show, featuring a new format to be implemented following consultations with artists, producers and music industry representatives, to select its entry.

== Before Eurovision ==
=== Finala națională 2026 ===
Finala națională 2026 was the national final format developed by TRM in order to select its entry for the Eurovision Song Contest 2026. The event was held at the Chișinău Arena in Chișinău on 17 January 2026, and was hosted by Daniela Crudu and Ion Jalbă, with Alisa Tanas and Bogdan Nigai serving as green room hosts. The show was broadcast on Moldova 1, Radio Moldova Muzical as well as online via TRM's official website moldova1.md and the broadcaster's Facebook and YouTube pages.

==== Competing entries ====
Artists and composers had the opportunity to submit their entries between 7 November 2025 and 7 December 2025. Artists could submit more than one song, and an international act was able to compete only if they were part of a duo or group where 50% of the lead vocalists bore Moldovan nationality. At the conclusion of the submission deadline, 37 valid entries were received by the broadcaster, of which 34 were performed at the live audition round that took place on 16 December 2025 at TRM Studio 2 in Chișinău. Competition producers Serghei Orlov and Roman Burlaca evaluated the songs during the live auditions and selected sixteen finalists to advance.

Artist	Song	Songwriter(s)
Adelisha	"Alegria"	Adelina Iordachi; Marian Stavar
Artiom Topal	"Money"	Artiom Topal
Bacho	"Tata"	Anton Ragoza; Covalenco Ghennadi; Edgar Bacioi; Iuri Rîbac
Cătălina Solomac	"Pink Margarita"	Atlas; Nikos Sofis
Cristy Rouge	"Bliss"	Cristina Rujitcaia; Victoria Demici
Curly	"Respir liber"	Grigore Chirsanov; Inga Luca
Dayana	"Doina"	Diana Sturza; Elsa Søllesvik; Lasse Midtsian Nymann; Linda Dale
Emforia	"Tipare"	Ion Staver
Evgenii Avramov	"Foc la ghete"	Evgenii Avramov
Ilinca Siviroveanu	"Running Through the Rain"	Radu Zaplitnii
Katy Rain	"Dance and Cry"	Bob Inski; Marianne Jones; Noah McNamara
Maxim Zavidia	"Allo"	Danil Murzac; Maxim Zavidia
Pavel Orlov	"Can't Say Goodbye"	Pavel Orlov
Sasha Flowers	"We Fight Till the End"	Alexandru Bublițchi
Satoshi	"Viva, Moldova!"	Vlad Sabajuc
Valleria	"Valerian Steel"	Valeria Condrea

==== Final ====
The final took place on 17 January 2026. Sixteen songs competed and "Viva, Moldova!" performed by Satoshi was selected as the winner based on the combination of a public online vote, the votes of a national jury and the votes of an international jury. In addition to the performances of the competing entries, former Eurovision entrants performed as guests: Paula Seling (Romania 2010 and 2014), Efendi (Azerbaijan 2020 and 2021), and Jamala (winner for Ukraine in 2016). A number of past Moldovan Eurovision entrants also performed in order to celebrate the country's 20th appearance at the contest: Zdob și Zdub (2005, 2011 and 2022), Natalia Gordienko (2006, 2020 and 2021), Natalia Barbu (2007 and 2024), Nelly Ciobanu (2009), SunStroke Project (2010 and 2017), Aliona Moon (2013), Cristina Scarlat (2014), and DoReDos (2018).

The national jury that voted in the final included Nelly Ciobanu, Igor Dînga (founder and vocalist of Cuibul, music producer), Andriano Marian (founder and conductor of the Moldovan National Youth Orchestra), Dorin Galben (journalist and influencer), SunStroke Project, Elena Stegari (producer, journalist at TRM), Gheorghe Mustea (flutist, naist, pedagogue, composer, conductor and academician), Rusalina Russu (television producer at Moldova 1), Natalia Gordienko, Elisoa Cynthia (content creator), Maria Petrova (content creator), Dmitrii Sergheev (music producer), Corina Caireac (music industry manager), Vlad Costandoi (founder of Sens Music, concert producer), and Lilu (journalist, content creator, TV presenter), while the international jury included Eric Lehmann (Head of the Luxembourgish Eurovision Delegation in 2024 and 2025, music journalist), Jamala, Deban Aderemi (British music journalist and blogger at Wiwibloggs), Efendi, and Paula Seling.

Final – 17 January 2026
R/O	Artist	Song	Jury		Public vote		Total	Place
R/O	Artist	Song	National	Intl.	Votes	Points	Total	Place
1	Artiom Topal	"Money"	5	2	136	0	7	9
2	Valleria	"Valerian Steel"	0	1	126	0	1	15
3	Adelisha	"Alegria"	0	0	177	0	0	16
4	Maxim Zavidia	"Allo"	7	3	165	0	10	6
5	Evgenii Avramov	"Foc la ghete"	0	0	593	6	6	10
6	Cătălina Solomac	"Pink Margarita"	8	7	861	10	25	3
7	Dayana	"Doina"	1	10	617	7	18	4
8	Satoshi	"Viva, Moldova!"	12	12	13,084	12	36	1
9	Sasha Flowers	"We Fight Till the End"	6	0	353	2	8	8
10	Cristy Rouge	"Bliss"	4	0	145	0	4	14
11	Ilinca Siviroveanu	"Running Through the Rain"	0	0	409	4	4	13
12	Bacho	"Tata"	3	4	373	3	10	5
13	Curly	"Respir liber"	2	6	218	1	9	7
14	Emforia	"Tipare"	0	0	535	5	5	11
15	Katy Rain	"Dance and Cry"	0	5	174	0	5	12
16	Pavel Orlov	"Can't Say Goodbye"	10	8	813	8	26	2

Detailed national jury votes
R/O	Song	N. Ciobanu	I. Dînga	A. Marian	D. Galben	SunStroke Project	E. Stegari	G. Mustea	R. Russu	N. Gordienko	C. Elisoa	M. Petrova	D. Sergheev	C. Caireac	V. Costandoi	Lilu	Total	Points
1	"Money"			7	1	6	7	6	5		7	6	4	3	4	1	57	5
2	"Valerian Steel"								2		2		2				6	0
3	"Alegria"					1								7		6	14	0
4	"Allo"	2		8		7			3	4	6	4	8	6	7	5	60	7
5	"Foc la ghete"		3														3	0
6	"Pink Margarita"	10	2		10	8	3	1	6	10	5	8	10	5	8	10	96	8
7	"Doina"	4	8	5	6		1	3		3	1		3	8			42	1
8	"Viva, Moldova!"	12	12	12	12	12	8	12	12	12	12	12	12	12	12	12	176	12
9	"We Fight Till the End"	5	1	6	7	3	5	7	10	5		3	5				57	6
10	"Bliss"	6	7		2	4	6	8	4	6		2	1	1	6	3	56	4
11	"Running Through the Rain"	3		3	4	2	4			1	4						21	0
12	"Tata"		10	4	3	5		2		2	8	7	7	4	3		55	3
13	"Respir liber"		6	2			10	10	8	8	3				5	2	54	2
14	"Tipare"	1		1								5		2	1	8	18	0
15	"Dance and Cry"	8	5		5		2	5	1			1			2	4	33	0
16	"Can't Say Goodbye"	7	4	10	8	10	12	4	7	7	10	10	6	10	10	7	122	10

Detailed international jury votes
R/O	Song	E. Lehmann	Jamala	D. Aderemi	Efendi	P. Seling	Total	Points
1	"Money"	2				5	7	2
2	"Valerian Steel"	1	1	2	3		7	1
3	"Alegria"					4	4	0
4	"Allo"			4	4	1	9	3
5	"Foc la ghete"						0	0
6	"Pink Margarita"	4	7	3	12	7	33	7
7	"Doina"	10	8	10	7	6	41	10
8	"Viva, Moldova!"	12	12	7	10	12	53	12
9	"We Fight Till the End"		2				2	0
10	"Bliss"	3			1		4	0
11	"Running Through the Rain"				2	2	4	0
12	"Tata"	8	5	6	6	3	28	4
13	"Respir liber"	6	4	12		8	30	6
14	"Tipare"		3	1			4	0
15	"Dance and Cry"	5	10	8	5		28	5
16	"Can't Say Goodbye"	7	6	5	8	10	36	8

=== Promotion ===
As part of the promotion of his participation in the contest, Satoshi will attend the Nordic Eurovision Party in Oslo on 21 March 2026 and the Eurovision in Concert event in Amsterdam on 11 April 2026. On 7 February 2026, he performed a revamped version of "Viva, Moldova!" at the Ukrainian national final in Kyiv. On 14 March 2026, he was a guest on TVP World in Poland and held a promotional event in Warsaw attended by the Romanian and Moldovan ambassadors to the country.

== At Eurovision ==
The Eurovision Song Contest 2026 took place at the Wiener Stadthalle in Vienna, Austria, and consisted of two semi-finals held on the respective dates of 12 and 14 May and the final on 16 May 2026. All nations with the exceptions of the host country and the "Big Four" (France, Germany, Italy and the United Kingdom) were required to qualify from one of two semi-finals in order to compete for the final; the top ten countries from each semi-final progressed to the final. On 12 January 2026, an allocation draw was held to determine which of the two semi-finals, as well as which half of the show, each country performed in; the European Broadcasting Union (EBU) split up the competing countries into different pots based on voting patterns from previous contests, with countries with favourable voting histories put into the same pot.

=== Semi final ===
Moldova was allocated for the first semi final, and later, was announced to perform in position one during the show. Shortly after, the qualification–announcement segment took place, and, at the end of the segment Moldova was announced as one of the ten qualifiers, therefore, Moldova would move on onto the final, for the first time since 2023.

=== Final ===
Moldova performed their song in position 16, after France and before Finland. After voting had ended, the jury votes were then announced. Moldova gained 43 points from juries across Europe (including Australia and Israel), which put them 17th overall going into the televote phase. Moldova had their points announced 9th, from which they got 183 points, putting them first on 226 points. However they were beaten not long after by Romania's Alexandra Căpitănescu. After all votes were announced, Moldova managed to earn a respectable eighth place result, which was Moldova's fourth best result, after 2005, 2017 and 2022's placing.

=== Voting ===
==== Points awarded to Moldova ====
Points awarded to Moldova (Semi-final 1)
Score	Televote	Jury
12 points	Belgium; Israel; Italy; Poland; Rest of the World	
10 points	Georgia; Portugal; San Marino	
8 points	Croatia; Greece	
7 points	Estonia; Germany; Lithuania; Montenegro; Serbia	Georgia; Serbia
6 points		Croatia; Lithuania; Sweden
5 points		Greece; Israel; Italy; San Marino
4 points	Finland	Montenegro
3 points		Finland
2 points		
1 point	Sweden	Belgium; Germany; Poland

Points awarded to Moldova (Final)
Score	Televote	Jury
12 points	Italy; Romania; Ukraine	
10 points	Estonia; France; Rest of the World	Romania
8 points	Czechia; Georgia; Israel; Latvia; Poland; Portugal	Ukraine
7 points	Belgium	
6 points	Croatia; Cyprus; Luxembourg; United Kingdom	Israel
5 points	Australia; Austria; Lithuania; Serbia	Bulgaria
4 points	Greece	
3 points	Bulgaria; Denmark; Germany	Greece; Lithuania; Serbia
2 points	San Marino	Montenegro
1 point	Azerbaijan; Finland; Switzerland	Croatia; Finland; Italy

==== Points awarded by Moldova ====
Points awarded by Moldova (Semi-final 1)
Score	Televote	Jury
12 points	Israel	Israel
10 points	Poland	Poland
8 points	Serbia	Greece
7 points	Croatia	Croatia
6 points	Greece	Belgium
5 points	Finland	Serbia
4 points	Sweden	Finland
3 points	Lithuania	Estonia
2 points	Estonia	Lithuania
1 point	Belgium	Sweden

Points awarded by Moldova (Final)
Score	Televote	Jury
12 points	Romania	Poland
10 points	Ukraine	Israel
8 points	Israel	Greece
7 points	Italy	Bulgaria
6 points	Bulgaria	Norway
5 points	Albania	Czechia
4 points	Finland	Australia
3 points	Greece	Romania
2 points	Croatia	France
1 point	Serbia	Italy

==== Detailed voting results ====
Each participating broadcaster assembles a seven-member jury panel consisting of music industry professionals who are citizens of the country they represent and two of which have to be between 18 and 25 years old. Each jury, and individual jury member, is required to meet a strict set of criteria regarding professional background, as well as diversity in gender and age. No member of a national jury was permitted to be related in any way to any of the competing acts in such a way that they cannot vote impartially and independently. The individual rankings of each jury member as well as the nation's televoting results were released shortly after the grand final.

The following members comprised the Moldovan jury:

- Andrei Zapșa
- Pavel Orlov (juror C in the final)
- Stanislav Goncear
- Cătălina Solomac
- Corina Caireac
- Ilona Stepan (juror E in the final)
- Victoria Cușnir (juror D in the final)

Detailed voting results from Moldova (Semi-final 1)
R/O	Country	Jury									Televote	
R/O	Country	Juror A	Juror B	Juror C	Juror D	Juror E	Juror F	Juror G	Rank	Points	Rank	Points
01	Moldova											
02	Sweden	8	4	11	10	12	12	7	10	1	7	4
03	Croatia	5	12	6	6	9	4	3	4	7	4	7
04	Greece	2	3	1	2	2	6	5	3	8	5	6
05	Portugal	11	5	10	9	13	5	12	11		11	
06	Georgia	12	14	14	14	14	8	13	14		13	
07	Finland	4	7	12	11	6	13	6	7	4	6	5
08	Montenegro	14	13	5	8	8	10	11	12		12	
09	Estonia	13	10	9	12	11	3	4	8	3	9	2
10	Israel	1	2	2	3	1	1	2	1	12	1	12
11	Belgium	7	6	4	7	4	9	10	5	6	10	1
12	Lithuania	10	8	8	5	7	11	9	9	2	8	3
13	San Marino	9	11	13	13	10	14	14	13		14	
14	Poland	3	1	3	1	3	2	1	2	10	2	10
15	Serbia	6	9	7	4	5	7	8	6	5	3	8

Detailed voting results from Moldova (Final)
R/O	Country	Jury									Televote	
R/O	Country	Juror A	Juror B	Pavel Orlov	Victoria Cușnir	Ilona Stepan	Juror F	Juror G	Rank	Points	Rank	Points
01	Denmark	16	16	13	7	13	15	23	15		13	
02	Germany	13	20	19	17	14	24	22	22		21	
03	Israel	2	7	1	6	2	1	2	2	10	3	8
04	Belgium	12	17	8	12	8	11	20	12		22	
05	Albania	8	10	10	10	17	20	13	13		6	5
06	Greece	1	6	5	4	3	5	5	3	8	8	3
07	Ukraine	21	23	20	14	20	12	8	19		2	10
08	Australia	7	9	4	15	6	13	6	7	4	11	
09	Serbia	17	15	24	11	12	22	21	20		10	1
10	Malta	18	14	18	22	22	10	9	18		19	
11	Czechia	14	3	2	23	16	16	4	6	5	17	
12	Bulgaria	5	1	7	5	5	2	7	4	7	5	6
13	Croatia	20	5	21	16	19	17	14	14		9	2
14	United Kingdom	24	21	14	24	21	23	18	23		24	
15	France	6	4	15	13	10	8	10	9	2	12	
16	Moldova											
17	Finland	22	8	12	8	9	6	11	11		7	4
18	Poland	3	2	3	1	1	7	1	1	12	16	
19	Lithuania	10	24	22	9	11	19	17	16		20	
20	Sweden	15	22	6	19	23	21	16	17		14	
21	Cyprus	23	13	11	21	24	14	19	21		18	
22	Italy	9	19	17	18	15	4	3	10	1	4	7
23	Norway	11	11	9	2	4	3	12	5	6	15	
24	Romania	4	12	16	3	7	9	15	8	3	1	12
25	Austria	19	18	23	20	18	18	24	24		23	

==== Controversy ====
Following the grand final, there was backlash in Moldova regarding the Moldovan jury awarding only 3 points to Romania (despite the Moldovan televote awarding 12 points to Romania regardless). TRM issued a statement saying that those points do not represent the opinions of the broadcaster; soon after, TRM general director, Vlad Țurcanu, resigned over the matter. Margarita Druță, who served as the Moldovan spokesperson during the grand final, also expressed her dissatisfaction over the Moldovan jury’s decision to award Romania just 3 points, revealing she was so upset by the result that she initially refused to announce the votes on air. Moldovan president Maia Sandu also reflected on the controversy, stating that “nothing and nobody should affect the relationship between Moldova and Romania” and emphasizing that the Moldovan televoting's 12 points for Romania were what mattered most.

Some of the jurors later came forward with explanations: Victoria Cușnir and Pavel Orlov clarified that voting should not take nationality into account, with Orlov adding that many other national juries gave 0 points to Romania, while Ilona Stepan claimed that Alexandra Căpitănescu's performance in the jury final was very different from the live show.

Căpitănescu stated that the band was not upset with the Moldovan jury and urged Romanians not to harbor negativity towards Moldova, saying that "it is not normal" for an entire country to be held accountable for the decision of seven people.

== See also ==
- List of music released by Moldovan artists that has charted in major music markets
