= Moldova in the Eurovision Song Contest 2024 =

- Eurovision Song Contest 2024
- Participating broadcaster: TeleRadio-Moldova (TRM)
- Country: Moldova
- Selection process: Etapa națională 2024
- Selection date: 17 February 2024

Competing entry
- Song: "In the Middle"
- Artist: Natalia Barbu
- Songwriters: Khris Richards; Natalia Barbu

Placement
- Semi-final result: Failed to qualify (13th)

Participation chronology

Moldova was represented at the Eurovision Song Contest 2024 with the song "In the Middle", written by Natalia Barbu and Khris Richards, and performed by Barbu herself. The Moldovan participating broadcaster, TeleRadio-Moldova (TRM), organised the national final Etapa națională 2024 in order to select its entry for the contest.

Moldova was drawn to compete in the first semi-final of the Eurovision Song Contest which took place on 7 May 2024. Performing during the show in position 11, "In the Middle" was not announced among the top 10 entries of the first semi-final and therefore did not qualify to compete in the final. This marked Moldova's first non-qualification since 2019. It was later revealed that Moldova placed thirteenth out of the 15 participating countries in the semi-final with 20 points.

After the contest Moldova briefly withdrew for the 2025 contest but returned in 2026.

== Background ==
Prior to the 2024 contest, TeleRadio-Moldova (TRM) had participated in the Eurovision Song Contest representing Moldova eighteen times since its first entry in 2005. Its best placing in the contest was third, which it achieved in 2017 with the song "Hey, Mamma!" performed by SunStroke Project. To this point, it had achieved another four top 10 placings at the contest: in 2005 when "Boonika bate toba" performed by Zdob și Zdub placed sixth, in 2007 when "Fight" performed by Natalia Barbu placed tenth, in 2018 when "My Lucky Day" performed by DoReDoS also placed tenth, and in 2022, when Zdob și Zdub returned to compete for a third time with the song "Trenulețul", performed with the Advahov Brothers, which finished in seventh place. In 2023, Moldova was represented for the second time (after 2012) by Pasha Parfeni, who performed the song "Soarele și luna"; the entry qualified for the final, where it ended in 18th position.

As part of its duties as participating broadcaster, TRM organises the selection of its entry in the Eurovision Song Contest and broadcasts the event in the country. It selected its entry via a national selection show between 2008 and 2020, while it selected its entry in 2021 via an internal selection. TRM was to held a selection show in 2022, but it was ultimately cancelled due to COVID-19 restrictions and it internally selected its entry during the audition round. In 2023, it organised the new national final format Etapa națională. TRM confirmed its intention to participate at the 2024 contest on 13 June 2023, announcing in November that it would held again Etapa națională to select its entry for 2024.

== Before Eurovision ==
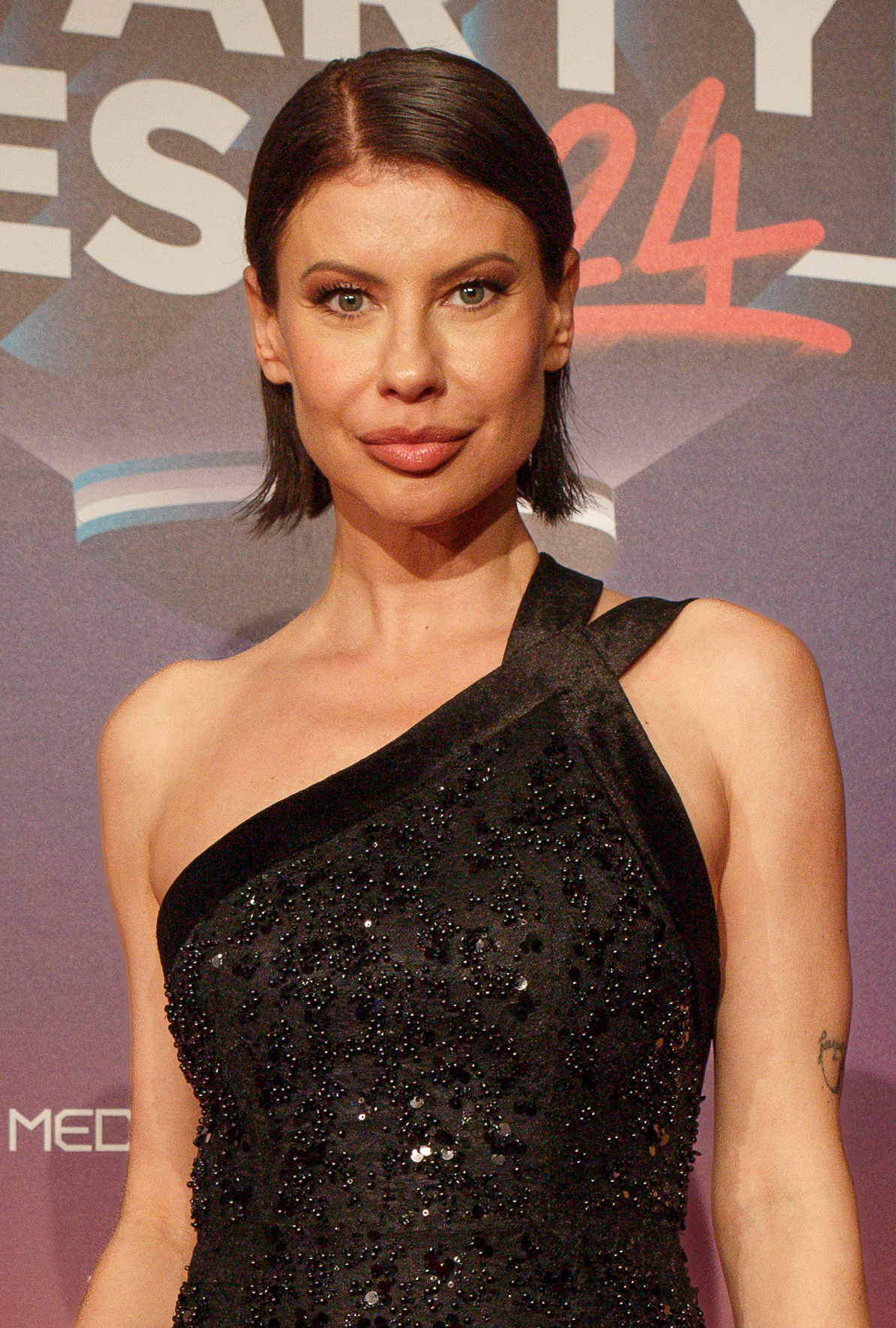
Natalia Barbu, winner of Etapa națională 2024, at the PrePartyES event in Madrid

=== Etapa națională 2024 ===
Etapa națională 2024 was the national final format developed by TRM in order to select its entry for the Eurovision Song Contest 2024. The event took place at the TRM Studio 1 in Chișinău and included a final held on 17 February 2024. The show is broadcast on Moldova 1 as well as online via TRM's official website trm.md, Eurovision Song Contest website eurovision.md, Facebook and YouTube pages, and for the first time via the official Eurovision Song Contest YouTube page.

==== Format ====
The selection took place in three stages: the received entries were first assessed by an expert committee between 22 and 26 December 2023; 32 of them (later reducing to 31) were selected to be performed at a live audition on 13 January 2024, broadcast for the first time on Moldova 1, where a jury selected eleven (originally planned to be ten) finalists by assigning each entry a score from 0 to 12; at the final, which was held on 17 February 2024, the winner was determined by a 50/50 combination of jury votes and a televote.

==== Competing entries ====
On 22 November 2023, TRM published the rules of the competition, opening a window for interested artists and composers to submit their entries until 22 December 2023. At the end of the submission period, 51 entries had been received.

On 26 December 2023, the list of the 32 artists and songs participating in the audition round was released by TRM. Among the selected competing artists was Natalia Barbu, who represented Moldova in the Eurovision Song Contest 2007, as well as Denis Midone, who represented Moldova in the Junior Eurovision Song Contest 2012. Aliona Moon and Milla appeared on the original list released by TRM but withdrew the following day; they were followed by Vovi Robian and his band on 10 January.

The jury panel that evaluated the songs during the live auditions and selected the 11 finalists consisted of Elena Stegari (head of broadcasting at TRM), Andrei Zapșa (deputy general manager for development at TRM), Lidia Isac (2016 Moldovan Eurovision entrant), Paul Gămurari (President of the Union of Composers of Moldova) and Liviu Știrbu (composer). Entries were assessed on criteria such as the melodic line, originality and interpretation of the composition.

Key: Selected for the final Entry withdrawn or disqualified

Results of the live audition round – 13 January 2024
R/O	Artist	Song	Songwriter(s)	Points	Place
1	Maria Ciolac	"Break Free"	Linda Persson; Ylva Persson	35	21
2	DPSTP feat. Arina	"Rise Up"	Anton Polygalov	28	27
3	Oliv Sky	"Another Universe"	Cristian Condrea; Rodica Olișevschi	36	16
4	Victor Gulick	"Fever"	Victor Gulic	41	8
5	Formația Vele	"Carnaval"	Mariana Craveț; Veaceslav Daniliuc	34	24
6	Sasha Bognibov	"Married to Twins"	Jacob Jonia; Sasha Bognibov	5	29
7	Denis Midone	"Back to Me"	Alexandr Misiura; Denis Midone; Mustaf Keita; Stelian Savu	37	15
8	Y-Limit	"Revolution"	Roman Lupu; Siarhei Panamarou	40	11
9	Oliv Sky	"Loud and Clear"	Artur Corcodel; Dan Iacovlev; Rodica Olișevschi	34	25
10	Victor Lozinsky	"Dirty Wind/Joker and Harley Move"	Victor Lozinsky	30	26
11	Tudor Bumbac	"Tudorel"	Tudor Bumbac	21	28
12	Laura	"Spune-mi"	Ioana Codrean; Marinela Mihalachi; Pavel Malîșev	35	22
13	Poli	"Lui"	Alina Zbancă; Marian Stârcea	36	17
14	Iulia Teleucă	"Runaway"	Eugen "Natan" Doibani	50	3
15	Viola Julea	"Light Up!"	Ecaterina Sanalatii; Viola Julea	43	6
16	Max Cara	"Broke the Chain"	Maxim Crasnicov; Pavel Malîșev	38	12
17	Sasha Letty	"DNA"	Jacob Jonia	40	10
18	Reghina Alexandrina	"Contrasens"	Dimitri Stassos; Eugen "Natan" Doibani; Reghina Alexandrina; Rickard Bonde Truumeel; Nikos Sofis	42	7
19	Valleria	"Rule (Rai Di Ri Di)"	Valeria Condrea	36	19
20	Natalia Barbu	"In the Middle"	Khris Richards; Natalia Barbu	58	1
21	Anna Gulko	"Perfect Place"	Anna Gulko	36	20
22	OL	"No Time No Space"	Denis Nazarov	45	5
23	Cătălina Solomac	"Fever"	Jonas Gladnikoff; Shawn Myers	46	4
24	Anna G	"Ay ay ay"	Anna Grosu	38	13
25	Valeria Pasha	"Anti-Princess"	Andrei Vulpe; Iana Bavelskaia; Ilya Iakoveț; Iuliana Parfeni; Ivan Luca; Lilian Dobândă; Maxim Crasnicov; Pasha Parfeni; Valeria Pasha	52	2
26	Oleg Spînu	"Jungle"	Jonas Gladnikoff; Shawn Myers	—	— (Note: Oleg Spînu was disqualified for using a backing track that doubled the lead vocals.)
27	Y-Limit	"What's the Fun"	Roman Lupu	38	14
28	Nicoleta Sava	"Bravo"	José Juan Santana; Rafael Artesero	40	9
29	Nino	"Up Again"	Sergiu Cristian Baba	35	23
30	Valleria	"Run"	Mark Stam; Valeria Condrea	36	18
—N/a	Aliona Moon feat. Milla	"Obosit"	Aliona Munteanu; Milla Danilceac	—N/a	
—N/a	Trupa Vovi Robian	"Robotul Vovi"	Vladimir Ciubotaru	—N/a	

==== Final ====
The final of Etapa națională 2024 took place on 17 February 2024. 11 songs competed and the winner was selected based on the 50/50 combination of a public online vote and the votes of an expert jury. In addition to the competing entries, Romanian band Holograf performed as a guest.

Immediately following the final, runner-up Valeria Pasha, who came first with the public but lost to Barbu in the tiebreak, announced to have filed an appeal to secure "transparency" about the results. The official rules of Etapa națională did not define whether a potential tie for first place would be resolved in favour of the public or jury, only stating that the winning entry would be "the song receiving the most points". The organizing broadcaster responded that following the tie for first place, the organising committee decided that Natalia Barbu would be declared the winner. They further stated that approximately 950 votes for Valeria Pasha had come from invalid phone numbers, and that a certain number of votes had been submitted from 48 different countries, likely using VPNs.

Final – 17 February 2024
R/O	Artist	Song	Jury		Public vote		Total	Place
R/O	Artist	Song	Votes	Points	Votes	Points	Total	Place
1	Nicoleta Sava	"Bravo"	22	5	211	3	8	7
2	Valeria Pasha	"Anti-Princess"	43	10	4,771 (Note: Following the results, TRM stated that over 950 votes for Valeria Pasha were sent from invalid phone numbers, and that additional votes were sent from 48 different countries, likely using VPNs.)	12	22	2
3	Reghina Alexandrina	"Contrasens"	19	3	294	6	9	6
4	Viola Julea	"Light Up!"	21	4	285	5	9	5
5	OL	"No Time No Space"	26	6	107	1	7	8
6	Sasha Letty	"DNA"	12	2	233	4	6	9
7	Natalia Barbu	"In the Middle"	60	12	2,421	10	22	1
8	Y-Limit	"Revolution"	7	0	147	2	2	10
9	Cătălina Solomac	"Fever"	29	7	905	7	14	4
10	Victor Gulick	"Fever"	11	1	76	0	1	11
11	Iulia Teleucă	"Runaway"	40	8	2,178	8	16	3

Detailed jury votes
R/O	Song	E. Stegari	L. Ştirbu	P. Gǎmurari	A. Zapşa	A. Moon	Total
1	"Bravo"	3	8	4	3	4	22
2	"Anti-Princess"	8	7	10	8	10	43
3	"Contrasens"	2	5	5	6	1	19
4	"Light Up!"	7	4	3	5	2	21
5	"No Time No Space"	10	3	2	4	7	26
6	"DNA"			6	1	5	12
7	"In the Middle"	12	12	12	12	12	60
8	"Revolution"	4	1		2		7
9	"Fever"	5	2	7	7	8	29
10	"Fever"	1	6	1		3	11
11	"Runaway"	6	10	8	10	6	40

=== Promotion and preparation ===
As part of the promotion of her participation in the contest, Barbu confirmed attended the PrePartyES event in Madrid on 30 March 2024, the London Eurovision Party on 7 April 2024, the Eurovision in Concert event in Amsterdam on 13 April 2024 and the Copenhagen Eurovision Party (Malmöhagen) on 4 May 2024. Her entry "In the Middle" was revamped ahead of the contest.

== At Eurovision ==
The Eurovision Song Contest 2024 took place at the Malmö Arena in Malmö, Sweden, and consisted of two semi-finals held on the respective dates of 7 and 9 May and the final on 11 May 2024. All nations with the exceptions of the host country and the "Big Five" (France, Germany, Italy, Spain and the United Kingdom) were required to qualify from one of two semi-finals in order to compete in the final; the top ten countries from each semi-final progressed to the final. On 30 January 2024, an allocation draw was held to determine which of the two semi-finals, as well as which half of the show, each country would perform in; the European Broadcasting Union (EBU) split up the competing countries into different pots based on voting patterns from previous contests, with countries with favourable voting histories put into the same pot. Moldova was scheduled for the second half of the first semi-final. The shows' producers then decided the running order for the semi-finals; Moldova was set to perform in position 11.

In Moldova, all three shows were broadcast on Moldova 1 and Radio Moldova, with commentary provided by Angela Rudenco.

=== Performance ===
Natalia Barbu took part in technical rehearsals on 28 April and 1 May, followed by dress rehearsals on 6 and 7 May. While joined by other performers at the national final, she was alone on stage for her performance of "In the Middle" at the contest; the violin solo was retained.

=== Semi-final ===
Moldova performed in position 11, following the entry from Finland and before the entry from Azerbaijan. The country was not announced among the top 10 entries in the semi-final and therefore failed to qualify to compete in the final. It was later revealed, that Moldova placed 13th with 20 points.

=== Voting ===
Below is a breakdown of points awarded by and to Moldova in the first semi-final and in the final. Voting during the three shows involved each country awarding sets of points from 1-8, 10 and 12: one from their professional jury and the other from televoting in the final vote, while the semi-final vote was based entirely on the vote of the public. The Moldovan jury consisted of Violeta Botezatu, Roman Burlaca, Paul Gamurari, Lidia Isac, who represented Moldova in the 2016 contest, and Livia Stirbu. In the first semi-final, Moldova placed 13th with 20 points, marking the country's first non-qualification to the final since 2019. Over the course of the contest, Moldova awarded its 12 points to Cyprus in the first semi-final, and to Ukraine in both the jury vote televote in the final.

TRM appointed Doina Stimpovschi as its spokesperson to announce the Moldovan jury's votes in the final.

==== Points awarded to Moldova ====
Points awarded to Moldova (Semi-final 1)
Score	Televote
12 points	
10 points	
8 points	
7 points	
6 points	
5 points	Portugal
4 points	Ukraine
3 points	Cyprus; Serbia
2 points	Azerbaijan; Ireland
1 point	Croatia

==== Points awarded by Moldova ====
Points awarded by Moldova (Semi-final 1)
Score	Televote
12 points	Cyprus
10 points	Ukraine
8 points	Croatia
7 points	Luxembourg
6 points	Azerbaijan
5 points	Ireland
4 points	Slovenia
3 points	Portugal
2 points	Lithuania
1 point	Australia

Points awarded by Moldova (Final)
Score	Televote	Jury
12 points	Ukraine	Ukraine
10 points	Israel	Italy
8 points	Sweden	Croatia
7 points	Croatia	Switzerland
6 points	France	France
5 points	Switzerland	Lithuania
4 points	Italy	Portugal
3 points	Greece	Israel
2 points	Ireland	Luxembourg
1 point	Armenia	Sweden

==== Detailed voting results ====
Each participating broadcaster assembles a five-member jury panel consisting of music industry professionals who are citizens of the country they represent. Each jury, and individual jury member, is required to meet a strict set of criteria regarding professional background, as well as diversity in gender and age. No member of a national jury was permitted to be related in any way to any of the competing acts in such a way that they cannot vote impartially and independently. The individual rankings of each jury member as well as the nation's televoting results were released shortly after the grand final.

The following members comprised the Moldovan jury:

- Violeta Botezatu
- Roman Burlaca
- Paul Gamurari
- Lidia Isac
- Livia Stirbu

Detailed voting results from Moldova (Semi-final 1)
R/O	Country	Televote	
R/O	Country	Rank	Points
01	Cyprus	1	12
02	Serbia	11	
03	Lithuania	9	2
04	Ireland	6	5
05	Ukraine	2	10
06	Poland	14	
07	Croatia	3	8
08	Iceland	13	
09	Slovenia	7	4
10	Finland	12	
11	Moldova		
12	Azerbaijan	5	6
13	Australia	10	1
14	Portugal	8	3
15	Luxembourg	4	7

Detailed voting results from Moldova (Final)
R/O	Country	Jury							Televote	
R/O	Country	Juror A	Juror B	Juror C	Juror D	Juror E	Rank	Points	Rank	Points
01	Sweden	10	12	12	7	14	11	1	3	8
02	Ukraine	4	3	3	6	1	1	12	1	12
03	Germany	11	17	21	11	6	14		11	
04	Luxembourg	9	13	5	14	5	9	2	13	
~~05~~	~~Netherlands~~ ‡ (Note: The Netherlands was disqualified prior to the final.)	~~14~~	~~10~~	~~20~~	~~22~~	~~4~~	~~10~~		N/A	
06	Israel	7	4	4	8	15	8	3	2	10
07	Lithuania	20	5	10	4	2	6	5	14	
08	Spain	19	23	19	24	26	26		22	
09	Estonia	16	25	18	25	16	23		15	
10	Ireland	25	14	16	16	22	21		9	2
11	Latvia	12	18	26	15	21	18		20	
12	Greece	15	8	9	9	23	13		8	3
13	United Kingdom	8	26	13	23	12	17		23	
14	Norway	6	21	17	17	13	16		12	
15	Italy	3	2	1	12	9	2	10	7	4
16	Serbia	22	19	22	13	20	22		21	
17	Finland	13	24	23	26	25	25		16	
18	Portugal	21	11	2	2	10	7	4	25	
19	Armenia	26	15	6	10	24	15		10	1
20	Cyprus	23	9	8	18	8	12		18	
21	Switzerland	5	1	7	5	7	4	7	6	5
22	Slovenia	24	20	11	21	19	19		24	
23	Croatia	1	7	24	3	3	3	8	4	7
24	Georgia	18	16	15	20	18	20		17	
25	France	2	6	14	1	11	5	6	5	6
26	Austria	17	22	25	19	17	24		19	
