= Moldova in the Eurovision Song Contest 2022 =

- Eurovision Song Contest 2022
- Participating broadcaster: TeleRadio-Moldova (TRM)
- Country: Moldova
- Selection process: Selection among Selecția națională 2022 live audition entries
- Selection date: 29 January 2022

Competing entry
- Song: "Trenulețul"
- Artist: Zdob și Zdub and Advahov Brothers
- Songwriters: Andrei Cebotari; Victor Dandeș; Mihai Gîncu; Roman Iagupov; Valeriu Mazîlu; Sveatoslav Staruș; Vasile Advahov; Vitalie Advahov

Placement
- Semi-final result: Qualified (8th, 154 points)
- Final result: 7th, 253 points

Participation chronology

Moldova was represented at the Eurovision Song Contest 2022 with the song "Trenulețul" performed by the band Zdob și Zdub and the Advahov Brothers. The Moldovan broadcaster TeleRadio-Moldova (TRM) selected the Moldovan entry for the 2022 contest by organising a live audition on 29 January 2022, where "Trenulețul" was selected by an expert jury.

Moldova was drawn to compete in the first semi-final of the Eurovision Song Contest which took place on 10 May 2022. Performing during the show in position 9, "Trenulețul" was announced among the top 10 entries of the first semi-final and therefore qualified to compete in the final on 14 May. It was later revealed that Moldova placed eighth out of the 17 participating countries in the semi-final with 154 points. In the final, Moldova performed in position 19 and placed seventh out of the 25 participating countries, scoring 253 points, 239 of them which came from the public televote.

== Background ==
Prior to the 2022 contest, Moldova had participated in the Eurovision Song Contest sixteen times since its first entry in 2005. The nation's best placing in the contest was third, which it achieved in 2017 with the song "Hey, Mamma!" performed by SunStroke Project. To this point, Moldova have achieved another three top ten placings at the contest: in 2005 where "Boonika bate toba" performed by Zdob și Zdub placed sixth, in 2007 where "Fight" performed by Natalia Barbu placed tenth, and in 2018 where "My Lucky Day" performed by DoReDoS also placed tenth. In the 2021 contest, "Sugar" performed by Natalia Gordienko qualified Moldova to compete in the final and placed thirteenth.

For the 2022 contest, the Moldovan national broadcaster, TeleRadio-Moldova (TRM), broadcast the event within Moldova and organised the selection process for the nation's entry. TRM confirmed their intentions to participate at the 2022 Eurovision Song Contest on 20 October 2021. Moldova has selected their entry via a national selection show between 2008 and 2020, while their entry in 2021 was selected via an internal selection. A selection show was to be held on 5 March 2022 to select Moldova's entry, but on 28 January 2022 it was revealed the entry will be selected during the auditions following the cancellation of the final due to COVID-19 restrictions.

== Before Eurovision ==
=== Artist selection ===
Artists and composers had the opportunity to submit their entries between 20 December 2021 and 24 January 2022. Artists could submit more than one song, and an international act was allowed to compete only if they were part of a duo or group where 50% of the lead vocalists were of Moldovan nationality. Songwriters could hold any nationality. At the conclusion of the submission deadline, 29 valid entries were received by the broadcaster and among the artists that submitted a song were 2005 and 2011 Moldovan Eurovision entrant Zdob și Zdub and 2012 Moldovan Junior Eurovision entrant Denis Midone. On 25 January 2022, "Intro" performed by Misscatylove was withdrawn from the selection. A selection show named Selecția națională 2022 was to be held on 5 March 2022 to select Moldova's entry, with an audition round to be held on 29 January 2022 to select the entries to compete in the final. However, on 28 January 2022, it was revealed that the entry will be selected during the auditions following the cancellation of the planned national selection due to COVID-19 restrictions.

The live audition round took place on 29 January 2022 at the TRM Studio 2 in Chișinău and an expert jury selected "Trenulețul" performed by Zdob și Zdub and Frații Advahov as the Moldovan entry for the Eurovision Song Contest 2022. The auditions were broadcast on Moldova 1, Moldova 2 and Radio Moldova as well as online via trm.md and via TRM's Facebook and YouTube pages. Entries were assessed on criteria such as voice quality and strength of the composition. The jury panel that evaluated the songs consisted of Geta Burlacu (singer, 2008 Moldovan Eurovision entrant), Vali Boghean (singer-songwriter), Cristina Scarlat (singer, 2014 Moldovan Eurovision entrant), Victoria Cușnir (journalist) and Aliona Moon (singer, 2013 Moldovan Eurovision entrant).

Results of the Live Audition Round – 29 January 2022
R/O	Artist	Song	Songwriter(s)	Place
1	Y-Limit	"Nothing More"	Roman Lupu	—
2	Katy Rain	"Lele"	Ecaterina Tostogan-Condrea	—
3	Zdob și Zdub and Frații Advahov	"Trenulețul"	Andrei Cebotari; Victor Dandeș; Mihai Gîncu; Roman Iagupov; Valeriu Mazîlu; Sveatoslav Staruș; Vasile Advahov; Vitalie Advahov	1
4	Marcela Scripcaru	"Starlight"	Aaron Sibley; Nikos Sofis	—
5	Naminal	"Stop Tonight"	Vadim Luchin; Timofei Tregubenco; Marcel Ștefăneț; Ghenadie Cubasov	—
6	Dianna Rotaru	"My Time Is Now"	Ylva Persson; Linda Persson; Rickard Bonde Truumeel	—
7	The Tramps	"Sky Blues"	Ruth Mussie; Jerusalem Yemane; Irena Krsteva; Kian Fakhary	—
8	Trio Eva	"Get a Kiss"	Mădălina Țurcan; Michael Ra	—
9	Denis Midone	"Run Away"	Denis Midone; Olga Fesenco	—
10	Sasha Bognibov	"(I Just Had) Sex with Your Ex"	Jacob Jonia	—
11	Annet Smirnova	"Toxic Eyes"	Mădălina Țurcan; Michael Ra	4
12	Ricky Ardezianu	"Cherchez la femme"	Ion Istrati; Tatiana Postolache	—
13	Tudor Bumbac	"Iartă-mă că te iubesc"	Tudor Bumbac	—
14	Lemonique	"Boys"	Michael Ra; Sergiu Ionaș; Mary Vegga; Fox Banger; einn. (Theodoros Xiromeritis)	3
15	Carolina Gorun and Danieli Shvets	"Take Me Anywhere"	Ylva Persson; Linda Persson; Rickard Bonde Truumeel	—
16	Mihaela Andrei	"Libre"	Paul Gamurari; Anatolie Vornicescu	—
17	Maxim Zavidia	"Ready"	Pasha Rudenko; Arina Berezhnaya; Alexey Streltsov; Nikos Sofis	4
18	Emilia Russu	"Yama"	Emilia Russu	5
19	Lanjeron	"Magic Carpet"	Serghei Forman; Ana Colesnicov	5
20	Pelageya Stefoglo	"I'm the Only One"	Yuliya Ogiokhyna	—
21	Sendrei	"Beginner's Luck"	Elviss Pētersons; Elad Lahmany	—
22	Viola Julea	"Before (Twin Flame)"	Ylva Persson; Linda Persson	—
23	Angel Kiss	"The Sunshine in Me"	Jacob Jonia	—
24	Valeria Barbas	"My Tree"	Valeria Barbas; Frank Schulte	—
25	Diana Elmas	"Spirit High"	Jacob Jonia	—
26	Ana Cernicova	"Silent Battlefield"	Þórhallur Halldórsson; Nikos Sofis	2
27	Ferum	"Love Is"	Dmitrii Jelezoglo	6
28	Viorela Moraru	"Tell Me That You Love Me"	Eugen Doibani; Radmila Popovici-Paraschiv	—
—N/a	~~Sasha Bognibov~~ (Note: Due to undisclosed reasons, Sasha Bognibov only performed one of his two selected songs.)	~~"My Friend Is Gay"~~	~~Sasha Bognibov~~	—

=== Preparation ===
Following the selection of the Moldovan entry, Vasile Advahov of the Advahov Brothers revealed that changes would be made to "Trenulețul" including added English lyrics. On 27 March, Zdob și Zdub and the Advahov Brothers was a guest during the Moldova 1 programme Cine vine la noi where they performed the final version of the song.

=== Promotion ===
Zdob și Zdub and the Advahov Brothers made several appearances across Europe to specifically promote "Trenulețul" as the Moldovan Eurovision entry. On 5 March, the artists performed the Moldovan entry as a guest during the final of the Romanian Eurovision national final. On 7 April, the artists performed during the Israel Calling event held at the Menora Mivtachim Arena in Tel Aviv, Israel. On 9 April, the artists performed during the Eurovision in Concert event which was held at the AFAS Live venue in Amsterdam, Netherlands and hosted by Cornald Maas and Edsilia Rombley. On 16 April, the artists performed during the PrePartyES 2022 event which was held at the Sala La Riviera venue in Madrid, Spain and hosted by Ruth Lorenzo.

== At Eurovision ==
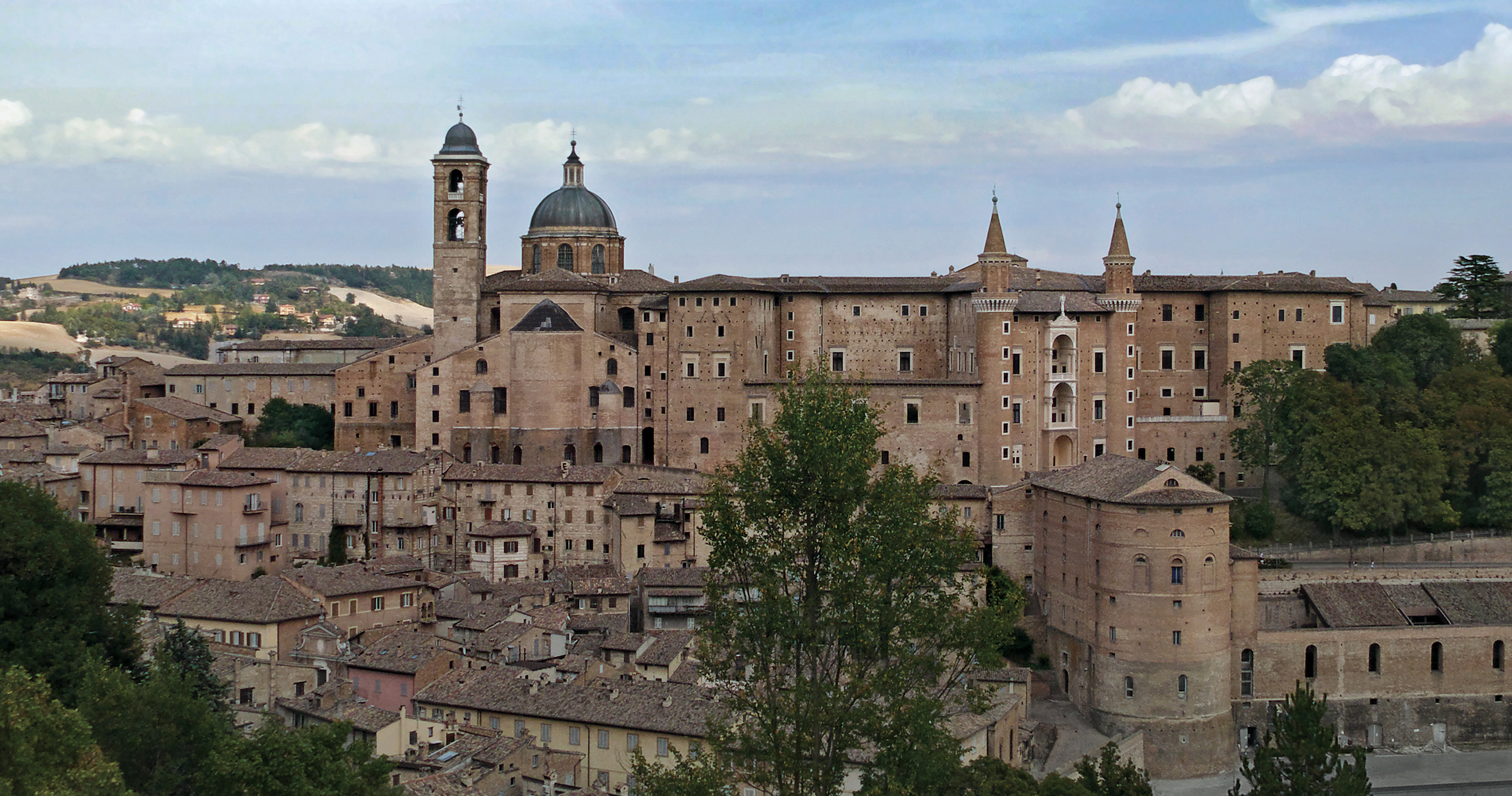
A video postcard introduced the Moldovan performance in the first semi-final and final of the Eurovision Song Contest 2022. The postcard was filmed in the Italian city of Urbino and featured virtual projections of Zdob și Zdub and the Advahov Brothers across the location.

According to Eurovision rules, all nations with the exceptions of the host country and the "Big Five" (France, Germany, Italy, Spain and the United Kingdom) are required to qualify from one of two semi-finals in order to compete for the final; the top ten countries from each semi-final progress to the final. The European Broadcasting Union (EBU) split up the competing countries into six different pots based on voting patterns from previous contests, with countries with favourable voting histories put into the same pot. On 25 January 2022, an allocation draw was held which placed each country into one of the two semi-finals, as well as which half of the show they would perform in. Moldova was placed into the first semi-final, which was held on 10 May 2022, and was scheduled to perform in the first half of the show.

Once all the competing songs for the 2022 contest had been released, the running order for the semi-finals was decided by the shows' producers rather than through another draw, so that similar songs were not placed next to each other. Moldova was set to perform in position 9, following the entry from the Netherlands and before the entry from Portugal.

The two semi-finals and the final were televised in Moldova on Moldova 1 as well as broadcast via radio on Radio Moldova. All broadcasts featured commentary by Ion Jalbă and Daniela Crudu. The Moldovan spokesperson, who announced the top 12-point score awarded by the Moldovan jury during the final, was Elena Băncilă.

=== Semi-final ===
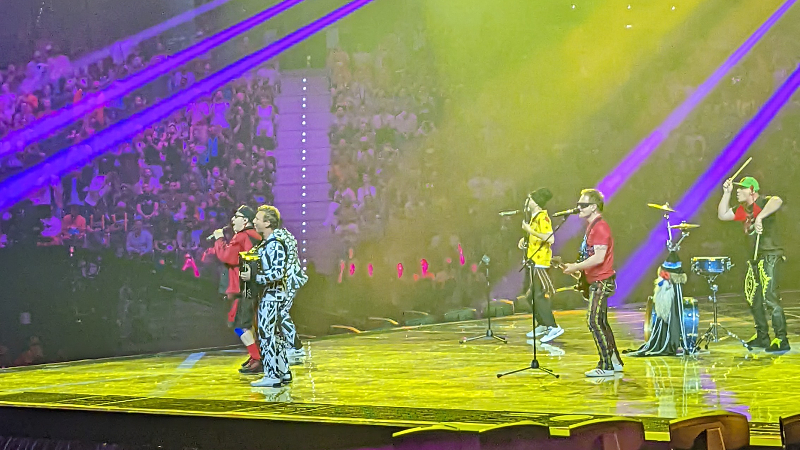
Zdob și Zdub and Advahov Brothers performing during the first semi-final

Zdob și Zdub and Advahov Brothers took part in technical rehearsals on 30 April and 4 May, followed by dress rehearsals on 9 and 10 May. This included the jury show on 9 May where the professional juries of each country watched and voted on the competing entries.

The Moldovan performance featured the members of Zdob și Zdub dressed in colourful outfits and the Advahov Brothers dressed in white suits with black patterns and lines. The LED screen projected ethnic patterns that resemble a train map with the stage waterfall lit in yellow and green colours and the secondary stage featuring light and strobe effects throughout.

At the end of the show, Moldova was announced as having finished in the top 10 and subsequently qualifying for the grand final. It was later revealed that Moldova placed eighth in the semi-final, receiving a total of 154 points: 135 points from the televoting and 19 points from the juries.

=== Final ===
Shortly after the second semi-final, a winners' press conference was held for the ten qualifying countries. As part of this press conference, the qualifying artists took part in a draw to determine which half of the grand final they would subsequently participate in. This draw was done in the order the countries appeared in the semi-final running order. Moldova was drawn to compete in the second half. Following this draw, the shows' producers decided upon the running order of the final, as they had done for the semi-finals. Moldova was subsequently placed to perform in position 19, following the entry from Iceland and before the entry from Sweden.

Zdob și Zdub and the Advahov Brothers once again took part in dress rehearsals on 13 and 14 May before the final, including the jury final where the professional juries cast their final votes before the live show. They performed a repeat of their semi-final performance during the final on 14 May. Moldova placed seventh in the final, scoring 253 points: 239 points from the televoting and 14 points from the juries.

=== Voting ===
Below is a breakdown of points awarded to Moldova during the first semi-final and final. Voting during the three shows involved each country awarding two sets of points from 1–8, 10 and 12: one from their professional jury and the other from televoting. The exact composition of the professional jury, and the results of each country's jury and televoting were released after the final; the individual results from each jury member were also released in an anonymised form. The Moldovan jury consisted of Adriano Marian, Cristina Scarlat, who represented Moldova in the Eurovision Song Contest 2014, Ilona Stepanov, Natan, and Radmila Popovici. In the first semi-final, Moldova finished in eighth place out of seventeen entries, marking Moldova's second consecutive qualification to the grand final. The final of the contest saw Moldova receive twelve points from Romania and Serbia in public televoting. Over the course of the contest, Moldova awarded its 12 points to Ukraine in both the jury and televote in the first semi-final and the final.

==== Points awarded to Moldova ====
Points awarded to Moldova (Semi-final 1)
Score	Televote	Jury
12 points		
10 points	Austria; Croatia; Italy; Netherlands; Portugal; Ukraine	
8 points	Bulgaria; Latvia	
7 points	France; Iceland; Lithuania; Slovenia; Switzerland	Greece
6 points	Armenia; Denmark; Greece; Norway	
5 points		Italy
4 points		
3 points		
2 points		Ukraine
1 point		Armenia; Bulgaria; Lithuania; Norway; Portugal

Points awarded to Moldova (Final)
Score	Televote	Jury
12 points	Romania; Serbia	
10 points	France; Germany; Italy; Netherlands	
8 points	Belgium; Croatia; Czech Republic; Georgia; Portugal; United Kingdom	
7 points	Austria; Bulgaria; Ireland; Latvia; Montenegro; North Macedonia; Poland; Slovenia; Spain	
6 points	Estonia; Iceland; Israel; Ukraine	Greece
5 points	Armenia; Denmark; Finland; Lithuania	Italy
4 points	Australia; Norway; San Marino; Switzerland	
3 points	Greece	
2 points		Netherlands
1 point	Albania	Armenia

==== Points awarded by Moldova ====
Points awarded by Moldova (Semi-final 1)
Score	Televote	Jury
12 points	Ukraine	Ukraine
10 points	Norway	Switzerland
8 points	Netherlands	Greece
7 points	Armenia	Norway
6 points	Lithuania	Armenia
5 points	Bulgaria	Portugal
4 points	Portugal	Latvia
3 points	Denmark	Iceland
2 points	Austria	Netherlands
1 point	Greece	Slovenia

Points awarded by Moldova (Final)
Score	Televote	Jury
12 points	Ukraine	Ukraine
10 points	Romania	United Kingdom
8 points	Spain	Sweden
7 points	Estonia	Switzerland
6 points	Norway	Australia
5 points	Sweden	Estonia
4 points	Lithuania	Belgium
3 points	United Kingdom	Spain
2 points	France	Portugal
1 point	Belgium	Azerbaijan

==== Detailed voting results ====
The following members comprised the Moldovan jury:

- Adriano Marian – Conductor
- Cristina Scarlat – Singer, represented Moldova in the Eurovision Song Contest 2014
- Ilona Stepanov – Conductor
- Natan – Singer
- Radmila Popovici – Lyricist

Detailed voting results from Moldova (Semi-final 1)
R/O	Country	Jury							Televote	
R/O	Country	Juror 1	Juror 2	Juror 3	Juror 4	Juror 5	Rank	Points	Rank	Points
01	Albania	16	16	16	9	15	15		16	
02	Latvia	6	10	4	10	3	7	4	14	
03	Lithuania	10	15	12	13	8	11		5	6
04	Switzerland	2	2	2	5	1	2	10	15	
05	Slovenia	11	11	9	11	13	10	1	13	
06	Ukraine	1	1	1	1	2	1	12	1	12
07	Bulgaria	14	9	15	12	14	13		6	5
08	Netherlands	12	8	10	7	6	9	2	3	8
09	Moldova									
10	Portugal	5	6	3	8	5	6	5	7	4
11	Croatia	15	12	13	14	10	14		11	
12	Denmark	8	13	11	15	12	12		8	3
13	Austria	13	14	14	16	16	16		9	2
14	Iceland	9	7	8	6	11	8	3	12	
15	Greece	3	3	6	2	9	3	8	10	1
16	Norway	4	5	7	4	4	4	7	2	10
17	Armenia	7	4	5	3	7	5	6	4	7

Detailed voting results from Moldova (Final)
R/O	Country	Jury							Televote	
R/O	Country	Juror 1	Juror 2	Juror 3	Juror 4	Juror 5	Rank	Points	Rank	Points
01	Czech Republic	20	20	20	21	20	21		21	
02	Romania	12	10	10	17	10	12		2	10
03	Portugal	10	8	12	9	9	9	2	11	
04	Finland	9	23	13	23	17	15		15	
05	Switzerland	6	4	5	8	3	4	7	20	
06	France	19	24	24	24	24	24		9	2
07	Norway	8	6	16	14	15	11		5	6
08	Armenia	15	13	14	15	14	14		13	
09	Italy	18	19	18	10	18	18		18	
10	Spain	7	7	15	7	7	8	3	3	8
11	Netherlands	13	14	9	11	12	13		14	
12	Ukraine	1	1	1	2	1	1	12	1	12
13	Germany	11	21	17	20	19	19		16	
14	Lithuania	23	12	21	19	16	20		7	4
15	Azerbaijan	14	11	8	13	6	10	1	19	
16	Belgium	4	9	4	6	11	7	4	10	1
17	Greece	17	15	11	16	21	16		17	
18	Iceland	21	22	22	18	22	22		24	
19	Moldova									
20	Sweden	2	5	3	4	5	3	8	6	5
21	Australia	16	2	7	3	8	5	6	23	
22	United Kingdom	3	3	2	1	2	2	10	8	3
23	Poland	22	16	19	12	13	17		22	
24	Serbia	24	17	23	22	23	23		12	
25	Estonia	5	18	6	5	4	6	5	4	7

== See also ==
- List of music released by Moldovan artists that has charted in major music markets
