= Trenulețul =

2021 single by Zdob și Zdub and Frații Advahov

Single by Zdob și Zdub
- Released: 10 December 2021
- Genre: Folk
- Length: 3:00
- Label: MediaPro Music
- Songwriters: Zdob și Zdub; Frații Advahov

Alternative cover
- Eurovision promo cover

Music video
- "Trenulețul" on YouTube

Eurovision Song Contest 2022 entry
- Country: Moldova
- Artist: Zdob și Zdub featuring Frații Advahov
- Language: Romanian

Finals performance
- Semi-final result: 8th
- Semi-final points: 154
- Final result: 7th
- Final points: 253

Entry chronology
- ◄ "Sugar" (2021)
- "Soarele și luna" (2023) ►

"Trenulețul" (Romanian pronunciation: [trenuˈletsul]; "The little train") is a song by Moldovan folk punk band Zdob și Zdub and folk musicians Frații Advahov. The song represented Moldova in the Eurovision Song Contest 2022.

== Context ==
The song talks about an energetic and happy train ride between the capitals of Moldova and Romania, Chișinău and Bucharest, respectively. According to the band, the music video that was released for the song was coincided with the reopening of a train route between the two cities.

The song was interpreted by many as being in support of a merger between Romania and Moldova, and lyrics referring to a union were cut from the original version.

== Eurovision Song Contest ==
=== Internal selection ===
For the 2022 contest, the Moldovan national broadcaster, TeleRadio-Moldova (TRM), broadcast the event within Moldova and organised the selection process for the nation's entry. TRM confirmed their intentions to participate at the 2022 Eurovision Song Contest on 20 October 2021. Moldova has selected their entry via a national selection show between 2008 and 2020, while their entry in 2021 was selected via an internal selection. The internal selection procedure was continued for their 2022 participation following the cancellation of a planned national selection due to COVID-19 restrictions.

The live audition round took place on 29 January 2022 at TRM Studio 2 in Chișinău and was broadcast on Moldova 1, Moldova 2 and Radio Moldova as well as online via trm.md and via TRM's Facebook and YouTube pages. The votes of an expert jury selected "Trenulețul" performed by Zdob și Zdub and Frații Advahov as the Moldovan entry for the Eurovision Song Contest 2022. Entries were assessed on criteria such as voice quality and strength of the composition. The jury panel that evaluated the songs consisted of Geta Burlacu (singer, 2008 Moldovan Eurovision entrant), Vali Boghean (singer-songwriter), Cristina Scarlat (singer, 2014 Moldovan Eurovision entrant), Victoria Cușnir (journalist) and Aliona Moon (singer, 2013 Moldovan Eurovision entrant).

=== At Eurovision ===
The 66th edition of the Eurovision Song Contest took place in Turin, Italy and consisted of two semi-finals on 10 May and 12 May 2022, and the grand final on 14 May 2022. On 25 January 2022, an allocation draw was held which placed each country into one of the two semi-finals, as well as which half of the show they would perform in. The European Broadcasting Union (EBU) split up the competing countries into six different pots based on voting patterns from previous contests, with countries with favourable voting histories put into the same pot. The song was drawn to perform in the first half of the first semi-final. When the EBU decided the running order for the semi-finals, Moldova was set to perform in position 9, following the entry from the Netherlands and before the entry from Portugal. At the end of the show, Moldova was announced as having finished in the top 10 and subsequently qualifying for the grand final. It was later revealed that Moldova placed eighth in the semi-final, receiving a total of 154 points: 135 points from the televoting and 19 points from the juries. They performed a repeat of their semi-final performance during the final on 14 May. Moldova placed seventh in the final, scoring 253 points: 239 points from the televoting and 14 points from the juries.

== Charts ==
Chart performance for "Trenulețul"
Chart (2022)	Peak position
Iceland (Tónlistinn)	21
Lithuania (AGATA)	14
Netherlands (Single Tip)	8
Sweden Heatseeker (Sverigetopplistan)	9
UK Singles Downloads (Official Charts)	48

== See also ==
- List of music released by Moldovan artists that has charted in major music markets
