= Valentin Todercan =

Moldovan filmmaker and actor

- Born: Valentin Todercan; May 13, 1961 (age 65); Corlăteni, Rîșcani, Moldova
- Education: Boris Shchukin Theatre Institute
- Occupations: Actor, director, screenwriter, producer
- Years active: 1985–present

Valentin Todercan (born May 13, 1961) is a Moldovan screen and stage actor, producer, screenwriter and director. Between April 10, 2007, and December 30, 2009, he served as president of TeleRadio-Moldova. In 2008, he was awarded the Order of Work Merit for his efforts in the development of the Moldovan public television. In 2011, he was elected councilor as part of the Municipal Council of Chişinău, and has been actively involved in the cultural development of the city.

== Education and career ==
Todercan was born in Corlăteni, Moldova on May 13, 1961. He was part of the first Moldovan generation of graduates from Moscow's Boris Shchukin Theatre Institute in 1985, and performed at Luceafărul Theater as part of its permanent group until 1988. In 1991, Todercan along with his Shchukin classmates founds The Eugène Ionesco Theater in Chișinău. He contributed to the organization of the first edition of Moldova's BITEI International Theater Festival between 1994 and 1997. With The Eugène Ionesco Theater, Todercan participates in a number of international theater festivals, including in Egypt, Japan, France, Great Britain, Poland, and others. In 1995, Todercan is appointed general manager at the Moldova-Film Studio until 2002, when he becomes in charge of the old Cinematography Department of Moldova. He then returns to Moldova-Film briefly in 2006 as general producer. He earned his master's of public administration around this time. Between 2007 and 2010, Valentin Todercan served as the president of TeleRadio-Moldova. On June 5, 2011, he was elected as councilor in Chișinău's Municipal Council, where he is due to serve until 2015.

== Works ==
=== Actor ===
==== Stage ====
- Waiting for Godot, Samuel Beckett, Eugène Ionesco Theater

==== Screen ====
- "Codrii"
- "Jocul de-a moartea"

=== Producer ===
==== Feature films ====
- "Jana", Moldova, 2004
- "Black Prince", Moldova, 2004
- "A 12-a Toamnă", Russia, 2003
- "Bucharest Express", USA, 2002
- "Patul lui Procust", Moldova, 2001

==== Documentaries ====
9 documentaries, including:

- "Petru Rareș," 2006
- "Ștefan – Cel mai mare ctitor de țară," 2004
- "Dimitrie Cantemir," 2003

=== Feature film screenwriter ===
- "Fie pâinea..."
- "Micuţa"
- "Un cartuş pentru porumbel" (also known as Vînătoarea)

=== Film director ===
- "Un cartuş pentru porumbel," (also known as Vînătoarea), Moldova, 2007.

== Awards ==
- Order of Work Merit ("Gloria Muncii"), 2008.
- Order of the Moldovan Orthodox Church "Binecredinciosul Voievod Stefan Cel Mare si Sfint," gr. II, 2009.

== Festivals ==
- International Theater Festival "BITEI" ed. 1994, 1997, Moldova
- Belarus Film Festival "Zilele filmului belorus în R. M.", Moldova
- Russian Film Festival "Zilele filmului rus în R. M.", Moldova
- Cinematography Manifestation "Christian Documentary", Moldova
- Scientific Conference "Cantemir and the Screen", Moldova
- National Film Festival "Săptămânile Filmului Naţional", ed. 2002, 2003, 2004, 2005, 2006, Moldova
