= Pasha Parfeni =

Moldovan singer-songwriter (born 1986)

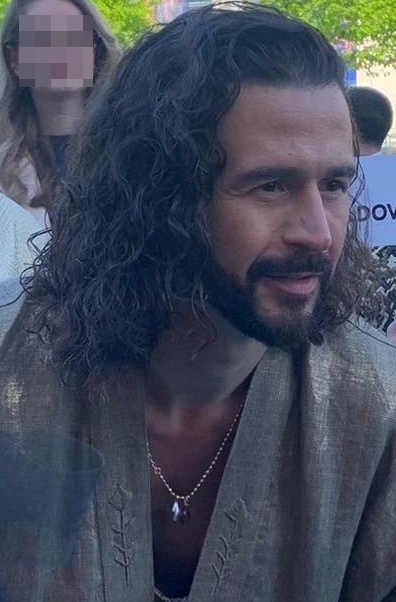
- Parfeni in 2023

Background information
- Also known as: Pasha Parfeny
- Born: Pavel Parfeni; 30 May 1986 (age 39); Orhei, Moldavian SSR, USSR
- Genres: Pop
- Occupations: Musician; singer; songwriter
- Years active: 2002–present
- Label: Sens Music

Pavel "Pasha" Parfeni (Romanian: [ˈpaʃa parˈfeni]; born 30 May 1986) is a Moldovan musician, singer and songwriter. He represented Moldova in the Eurovision Song Contest 2012 with his song "Lăutar", placing 11th. He was formerly known for being the lead singer of the Moldovan band SunStroke Project. He represented Moldova again in the Eurovision Song Contest 2023 with the song "Soarele și luna", placing 18th.

== Early life ==
Born in Orhei, Parfeni had been surrounded by music from a young age. His mother was a piano teacher at the local music school, while his father was a singer and a guitarist.

While in Orhei, he studied piano from a young age, and in 2002 enrolled at Tiraspol Music College, where he gained more vocal experience. In 2006, Parfeni continued his musical studies at the State Academy of Music, Theatre and Fine Arts.

== Musical career ==
=== SunStroke Project ===
In 2008, Parfeni met and joined the creators of the band SunStroke Project, Anton Ragoza and Sergey Stepanov, who were in need of a vocalist. In 2009, the band entered Moldova's national selection contest for the Eurovision Song Contest 2009, where they placed third with their song "No Crime", which Parfeni wrote and composed. In the same year, he left SunStroke Project to pursue a solo career after his contract's expiration, being replaced by Sergei Yalovitsky.

=== Contests ===
As a solo artist, Parfeni has participated and won in numerous competitions and music festivals. He won first place out of 23 performers in the George Grigoriu International Pop Music Festival in May 2009, the grand prize of which was a Volkswagen Passat. A few months later, in July, he placed second in the 2009 Slavianski Bazaar with the songs "Svecia Gorela", "Dac-ai Fi", and "We Are The Champions". While he lost to Russian contestant Dima Danilenko, he won a cash prize that was equivalent to 6000 USD. In the same year, he participated in the Mamaia Contest in Romania, taking first place with "You Do Not See The Sky", composed by Andrew Tudor. He also entered but did not win in the 2009 Golden Stag Festival.

==== Eurovision Song Contest ====
In 2010, Parfeni again entered the Moldovan national selection for the Eurovision Song Contest, but this time as a solo artist. He tied in second with his song, "You Should Like", which was defeated by his former band SunStroke Project's collaboration with Olia Tira.

The next year, in 2011, he once again failed to get the Moldovan delegation to the Eurovision Song Contest, placing third in the national selection with his song "Dorule".

Parfeni finally won the Moldovan national selection in 2012, representing the country in that year's Eurovision Song Contest. The song, "Lăutar", was written by Parfeni and composed in a collaboration with Alex Brașoveanu, placing 5th in the first semi-final, and 11th in the final.

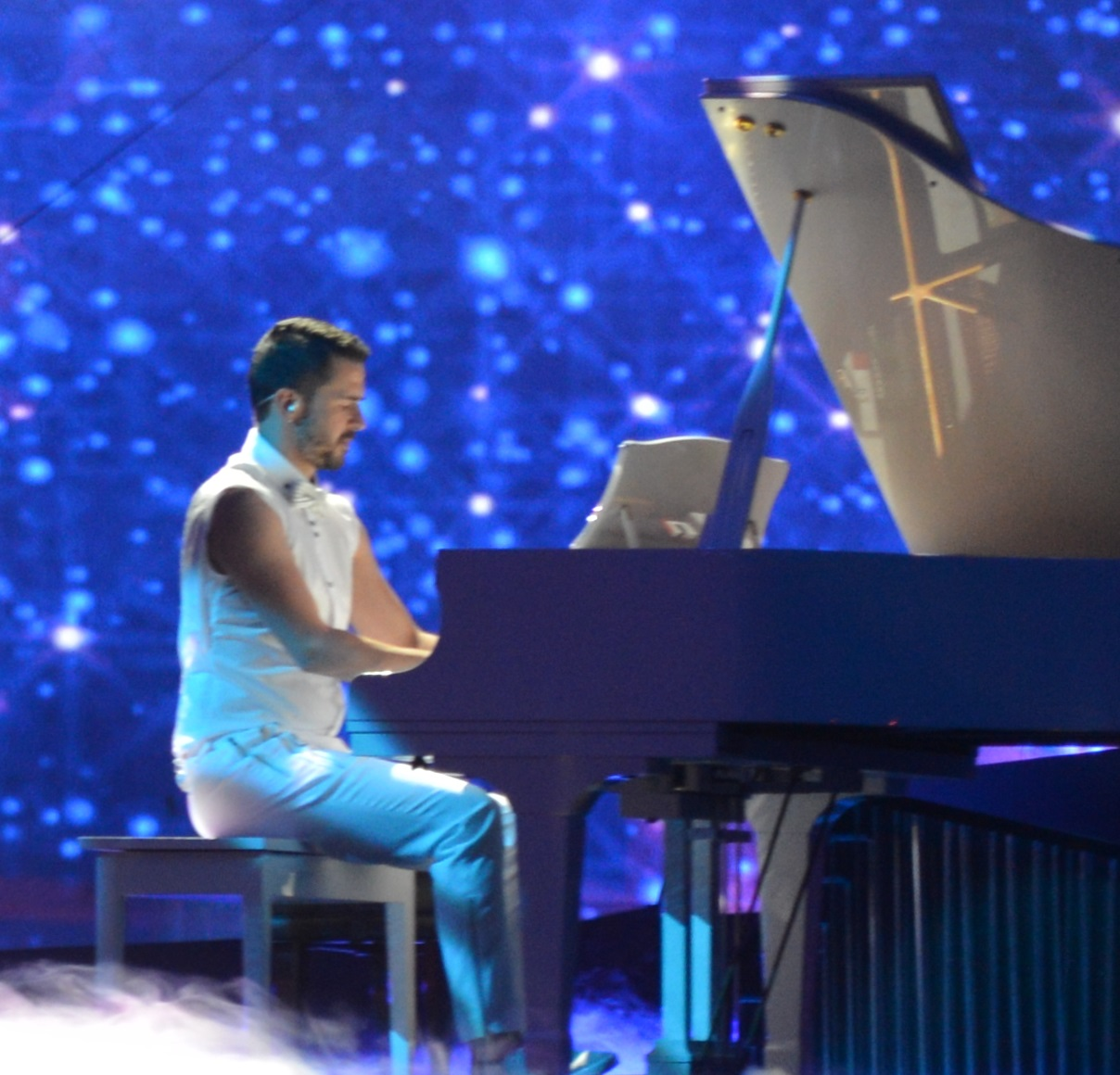
Parfeni performing at the Eurovision Song Contest 2013

For the Eurovision Song Contest 2013 in Malmö, Parfeni composed together with Yuliana Scutari and Serghei Legheida the song "A Thousand" for Aliona Moon in the Moldovan national selection. Moon was one of his backup singers for "Lăutar" in 2012. The song won and represented Moldova in the contest, with Parfeni accompanying Moon on stage at the piano. It ranked fourth in the first semi-final, and again 11th in the final. In 2015, he composed the song "Maricica" for DoReDoS, which placed sixth in the Moldovan national selection.

In 2020, he competed in the Moldovan national selection again with the song, "My Wine" composed in collaboration with Vica Demici. This time he finished second behind Natalia Gordienko.

In 2023, he entered the new Moldovan national final Etapa Națională with the song "Soarele și luna" written together with Yuliana Scutari. He qualified from the auditions stages making it to the final on 4 March. He then won the contest by winning both the jury vote and the public vote, and as a result represented Moldova in the Eurovision Song Contest 2023 in Liverpool. This was his third appearance at the contest for Moldova. Parfeni placed fifth in the first semi-final, qualifying for the final where he ultimately came 18th with a score of 96 points.

== Discography ==
=== Singles ===
List of singles, with selected chart positions
Title	Year	Peak chart positions				Album
Title	Year	MDA Air.	FIN	LTU	SWE Heat.	Album
"Lăutar"	2012	2	—	—	—	Non-album singles
"Lasa-ma" (with Nicoleta Nucă)	2021	24	—	—	—	Non-album singles
"Orele" (with Cleopatra Stratan)	2021	30	—	—	—	Non-album singles
"Soarele și luna"	2023	24	40	16	15	Non-album singles
"Vecinii"	2024	29	—	—	—	Non-album singles
"—" denotes a recording that did not chart or was not released in that territory.

== See also ==
- List of music released by Moldovan artists that has charted in major music markets

Awards and achievements
Preceded by Zdob și Zdub with "So Lucky"	Moldova in the Eurovision Song Contest; 2012	Succeeded by Aliona Moon with "O mie"
Preceded by Zdob și Zdub and Advahov Brothers with "Trenulețul"	Moldova in the Eurovision Song Contest; 2023	Succeeded by Natalia Barbu with "In the Middle"
