= Radio Moldova Internațional =

Romanian-language radio station in Moldova

- Type: Radio network
- Country: Moldova
- Availability: International
- Owner: Teleradio-Moldova
- Launch date: 1992
- Dissolved: 2013
- Official website: www.trm.md

Radio Moldova Internațional (RMI) was the second publicly funded radio broadcaster in Moldova.
