= Angela Sârbu =

Moldovan journalist

- Born: 29 October 1974 (age 51)
- Education: Moldova State University
- Occupation: Journalist
- Known for: head of Moldova 1

Angela Sârbu (born 29 October 1974) is a journalist from the Republic of Moldova.

== Biography ==
Angela Sârbu was born on 29 October 1974. She graduated in 1996 from the Moldova State University and studied at Charles University in Prague (2007–2009). She was the director of the Independent Journalism Center in Chişinău (2000–2010).

== Director Moldova 1 ==
On 20 February 2010 Angela Sârbu was elected as director of the national TV station, Moldova 1, from among 12 candidates for the job. Other 11 candidates that sought election to the post were: Ghenadie Brega, Aurelian Lavric, Alexandru Grosu, Gheorghe Ciubotaru, Oleg Grajdean, Ecaterina Stratan, Efim Josanu, Gheorghe Bîrsan, Mircea Surdu, Mihail Mihailov, Valeriu Frumusachi.

== See also ==
- Union of Journalists of Moldova
