= Natalia Barbu =

Moldovan singer and songwriter (born 1979)

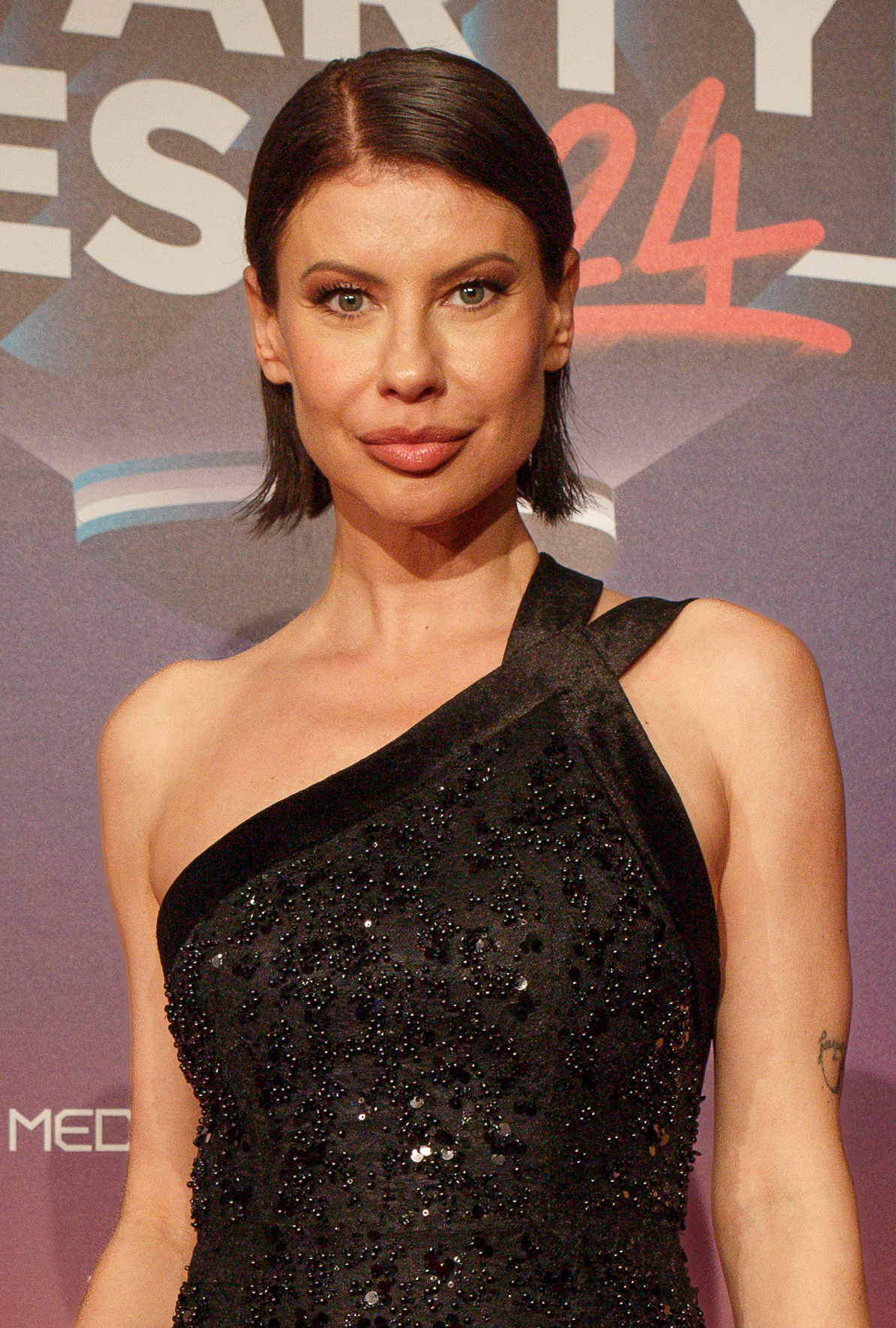
- Barbu in 2024

Background information
- Born: 22 August 1979 (age 47); Bălți, Moldavian SSR, USSR
- Genre: Pop
- Occupations: Singer; songwriter
- Instruments: Vocals; violin
- Years active: 2001–present
- Labels: Sony BMG; Cat Music; Rassada Music
- Website: barbunatalia.com

Natalia Barbu (Romanian pronunciation: [naˈtali.a ˈbarbu]; born 22 August 1979) is a Moldovan singer and songwriter. She is best-known for representing Moldova in the Eurovision Song Contest 2007 with the song "Fight". Barbu represented the country again in 2024 with the song "In the Middle".

== Music career ==
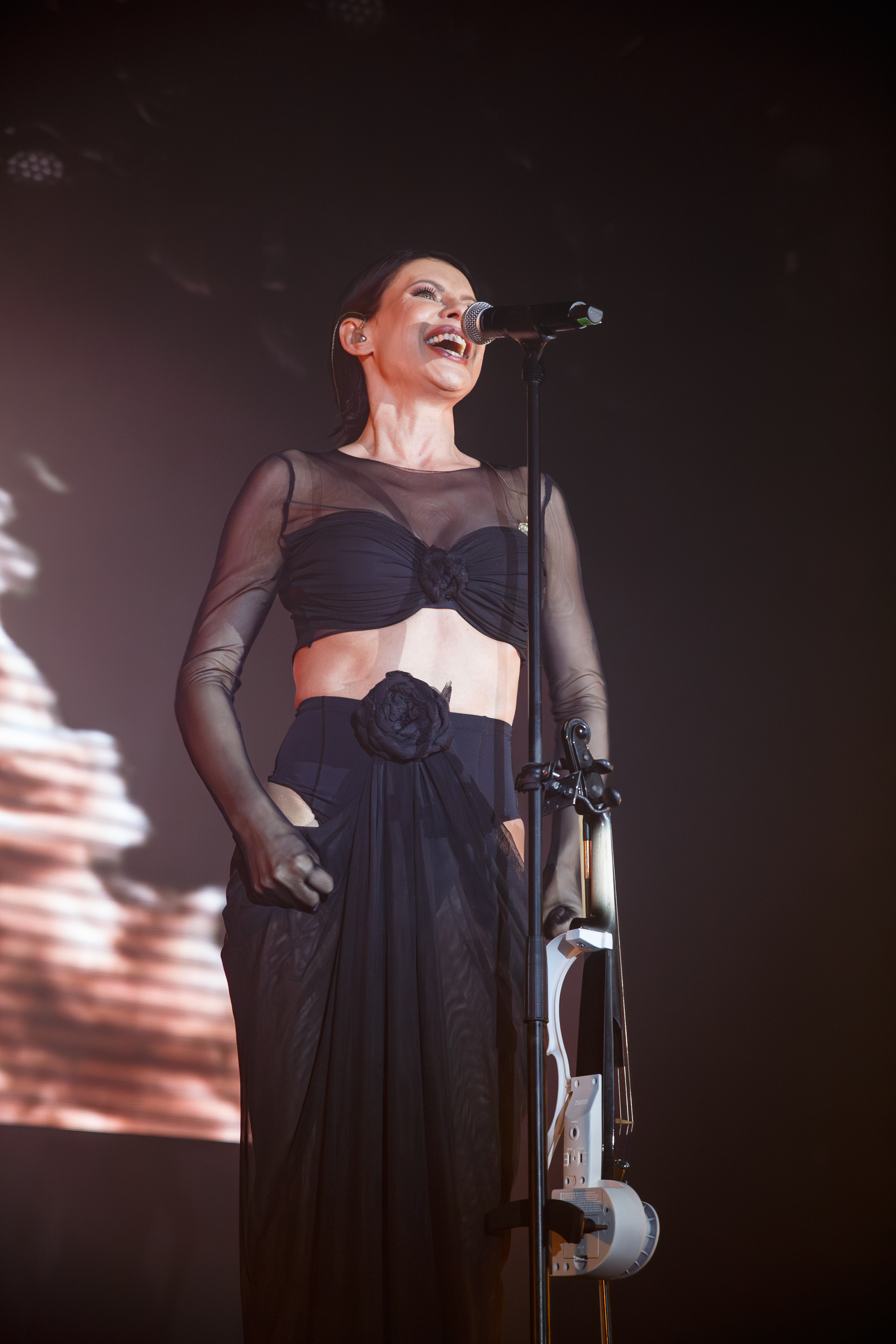
Barbu performing in Madrid during PrePartyES 2024

Throughout her career, Barbu has worked with Moldovan band Trigon on an alternative jazz-folk experiment. She writes her own lyrics, composes the music for most of her songs, and collaborates on the arrangements with her crew. In 2006, Barbu signed a three-year contract with Cat Music Records under Sony Music office in Bucharest.

Barbu's main success has been the release of her single "Îngerul meu" (lit. 'My Angel') in Romania. The song, ranked first, remained in the Romanian Top 100 for eleven weeks and was much featured on MTV Romania.

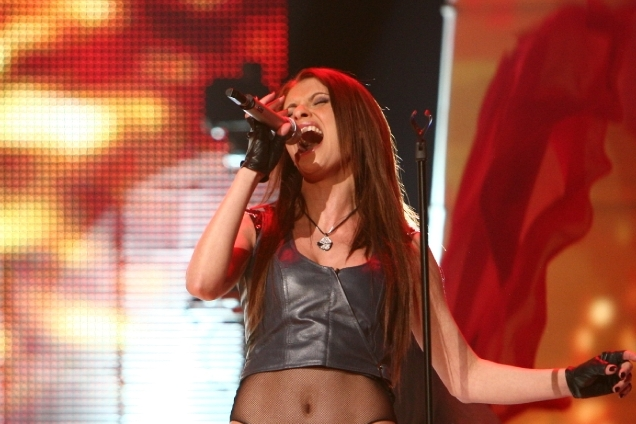
Barbu performing at the Eurovision Song Contest 2007

On 14 December 2006, Barbu was selected to represent Moldova at the Eurovision Song Contest 2007 with the song "Fight". At the contest, she qualified from the semi-final on 10 May 2007 and ultimately placed 10th in the final on 12 May 2007, scoring 109 points.

In 2012, Barbu began collaboration with musical producer Radu Sirbu and songwriter Ana Sirbu under the label Rassada Music. At the end of the summer Natalia premiered her new track, "I Said It's Sad", which she says is a major style change for her. The new song reached No. 1 position in Top 10 Airplay Moldova. Later in 2012, she released "Iubire Cu Aroma De Cafea" and "Confession", which participated at the Romanian national selection for Eurovision Song Contest 2013.

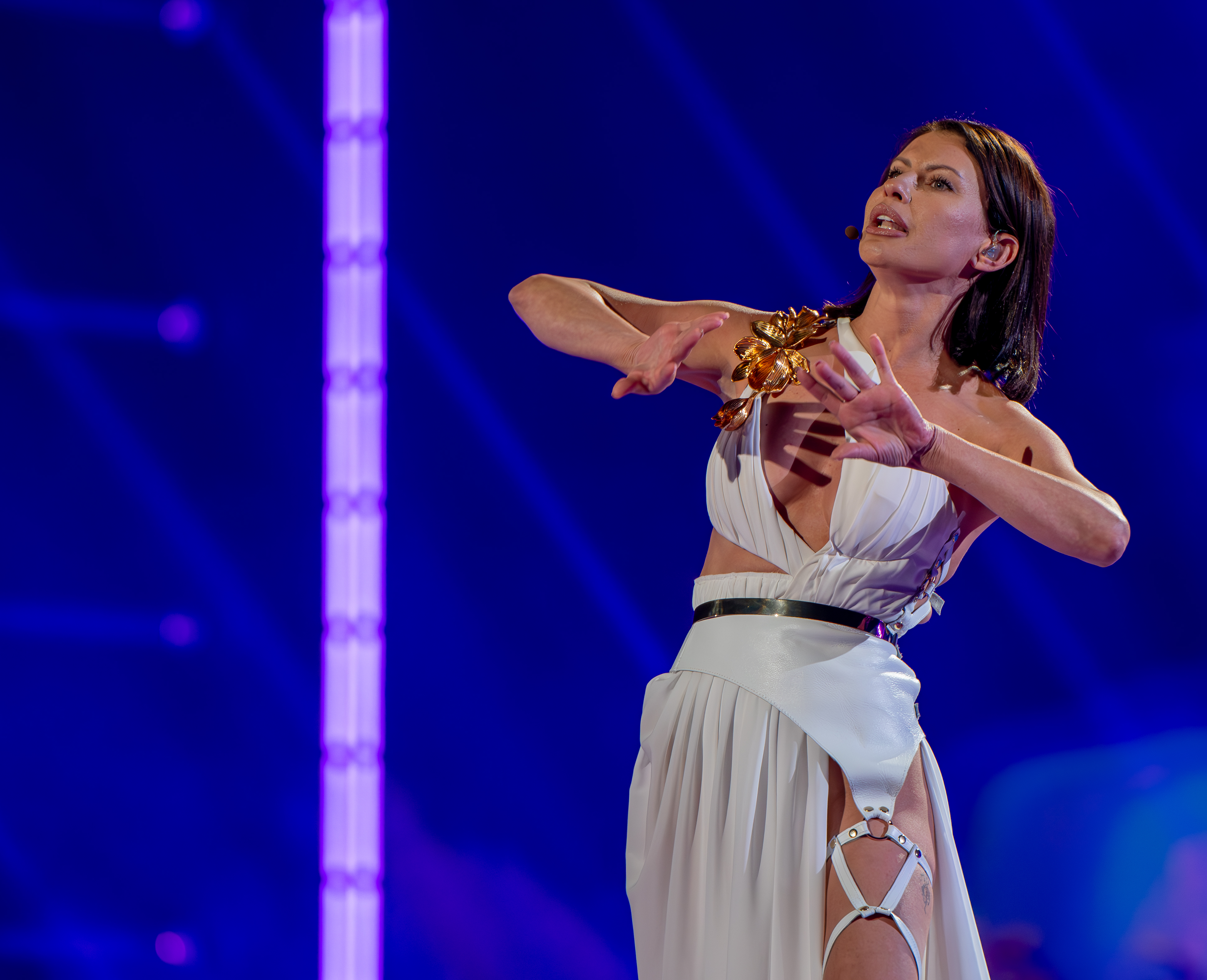
Natalia Barbu at the ESC 2024 rehearsal

Barbu was selected to take part in Etapa națională 2024, the Moldovan national final for the Eurovision Song Contest 2024, with the song "In the Middle". She came first in the audition round on 13 January 2024 and qualified for the final. There, she was selected as the Moldovan entrant for the contest. At the contest, the singer failed to qualify from the first semi-final on 7 May 2024, placing 13th out of 15 with 20 points.

== Personal life ==
In 2011, Barbu married a Romanian businessman and currently lives with him in Romania. They have two children together.

== Discography ==
- Între ieri și azi (lit. 'Between Yesterday And Today') (2001)
- Zbor de dor (2003)
- Interpreta Natalia Barbu (2009)
- La capatul cerului (2021)

== Interview ==
Barbu gave an interview for Wikipedia:

Awards and achievements
Preceded by Arsenium & Natalia Gordienko feat. Connect-R with "Loca"	Moldova in the Eurovision Song Contest; 2007	Succeeded by Geta Burlacu with "A Century of Love"
Preceded by Pasha Parfeni with "Soarele și luna"	Moldova in the Eurovision Song Contest; 2024	Succeeded by Satoshi with "Viva, Moldova!"
