= Satoshi (singer) =

Moldovan rapper and singer-songwriter (born 1998)

- Satoshi in 2026
- Born: Vlad Sabajuc; 13 September 1998 (age 28); Cahul, Moldova
- Citizenship: Moldova; Romania
- Occupations: Singer; songwriter; rapper
- Years active: 2019–present
- Musical career
- Instruments: Vocal, drums
- Label: Versus Artist

Vlad Sabajuc (Note: Romanian pronunciation: [vlad sabaˈʒuk]) (born 13 September 1998), known professionally as Satoshi, (Note: Romanian pronunciation: [saˈtoʃi]; Japanese pronunciation: [saꜜtoɕi]) is a Moldovan rapper and singer-songwriter. He represented Moldova in the Eurovision Song Contest 2026 with the song "Viva, Moldova!".

== Biography ==
Vlad Sabajuc was born on 13 September 1998 in Cahul, Moldova. He was raised in Cahul, where he lived until the age of 18. He began composing music in the seventh grade and taught himself to play the drums. In 2019, he launched the musical project Satoshi. At the beginning of 2022, Satoshi signed with the record label Versus Artist, part of BR Media Group. He studied at the Academy of Music, Theatre and Fine Arts in Chișinău, Moldova.

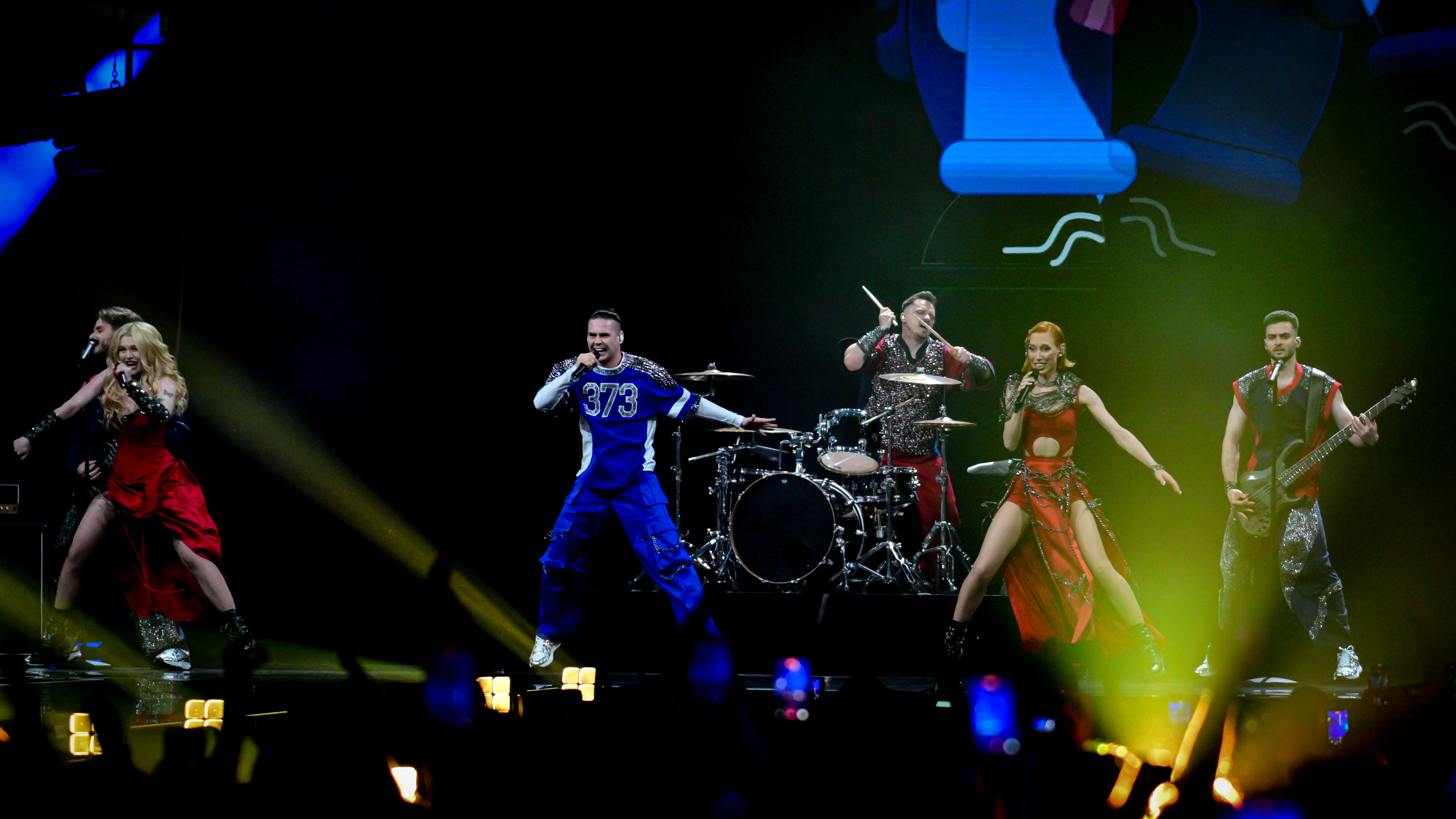
Satoshi at Eurovision 2026 Semi Final 1 rehearsal in Vienna

In January 2026, Satoshi competed in Finala Națională with the song "Viva, Moldova!". He won the contest, winning the public vote and both national and international jury votes, thereby earning the right to represent Moldova at the Eurovision Song Contest 2026 in Vienna, Austria. After qualifying for the final he placed 8th, earning 226 points.

== Personal life ==
In April 2024, he stated in an interview that he had also held Romanian citizenship for many years.

== Discography ==
=== Albums ===
- Rush (2022)
- +373 (2024)
- Sport (2024)
- Minim Efort (2025)
- VATRA (2026)

=== Songs ===
- "Cad în sus" (2020)
- "Origini" (2020)
- "Sunt" (2020)
- "Eden" (2020)
- "Est" (2021)
- "Căldură pe dos" (2021)
- "Unmaturman" (featuring Mahaya) (2021)
- "Foaie verde" (2021)
- "Rush" (2022)
- "I Love You" (featuring Prima Dragoste) (2022)
- "Venice Beach" (2022)
- "Mama mi-a spus" (2022)
- "Dragostea mare" (2022)
- "N-avem scuze" (2023)
- "Asta-i situația" (2023)
- "Am venit" (2023)
- "Căștile mele" (2023)
- "Dansăm" (2023)
- "Atâta pot" (2023)
- "Unde verile" (2023)
- "Lucruri noi" (2023)
- "Semafoare" (2023)
- "Singur" (2023)
- "Ochii" (2023)
- "În ce moment te-am întrebat" (2024)
- "Bate, vântule" (featuring Irina Rimes) (2024)
- "Soarele răsare din nou" (2024)
- "Cel mai probabil" (2024)
- "Am un frate" (2024)
- "Sari" (2024)
- "Strigă" (2024)
- "Siluete" (2024)
- "Cum se întâmplă" (2024)
- "Oi Boy" (2024)
- "U La La" (2024)
- "Cu cine ții" (2024)
- "Următoarea întrebare" (2024)
- "Faruri" (2024)
- "De partea ta" (2025)
- "Pentru Cei Care Vin" (featuring Dara) (2026)
- "All We Are About" (2026)

=== Charted songs ===
Title	Year	Peak chart positions		Album
Title	Year	MDA Air.	ROM Air.	Album
"Noaptea pe la 3" (featuring Carla's Dreams)	2023	16	—	Non-album singles
"Diferente"	2024	—	81	Non-album singles
"Viva, Moldova!"	2025	75	—	Non-album singles
"—" denotes a recording that did not chart or was not released in that territory.

== See also ==
- List of music released by Moldovan artists that has charted in major music markets

Awards and achievements
Preceded by Natalia Barbu with "In the Middle"	Moldova in the Eurovision Song Contest; 2026	Succeeded by TBD
