= Advahov Brothers =

Moldovan musical duo

Advahov Brothers Frații Advahov
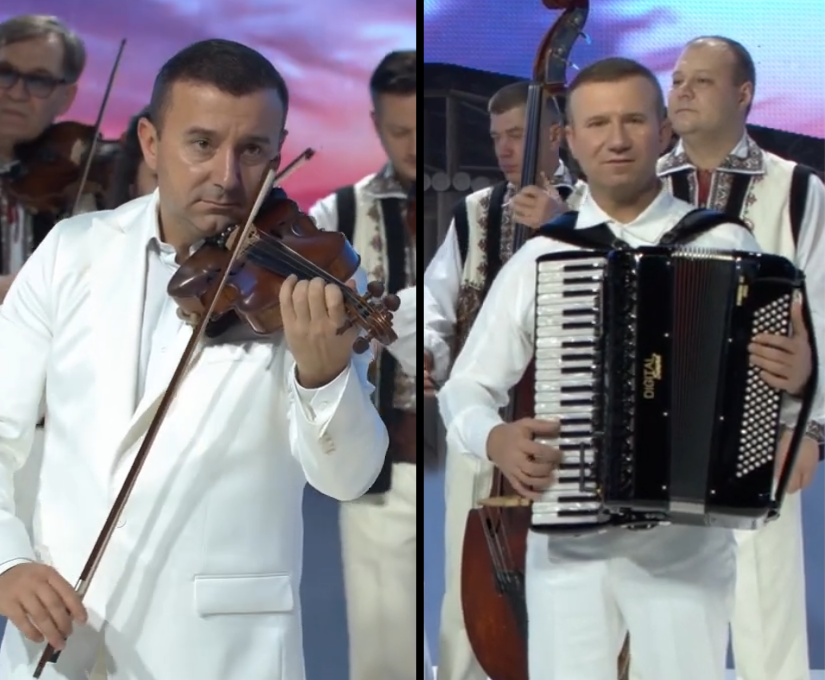
- Vasile and Vitalie Advahov in 2022

Background information
- Origin: Chișinău, Moldova
- Genres: Folk
- Years active: 2005–present
- Members: Vasile Advahov; Vitalie Advahov

The Advahov Brothers (Romanian: Frații Advahov, IPA: [ˈfratsij adˈvahov]) are a Moldovan folk music duo, consisting of the brothers Vasile and Vitalie Advahov. The duo was founded in 2005 and is based in Chișinău. Along with Zdob și Zdub, they represented Moldova in the Eurovision Song Contest 2022 in Turin, Italy, with the song "Trenulețul".

== Early life ==
Vitalie and Vasile Advahov were born in Cahul, Moldova, on 18 January 1978 and 26 April 1979 respectively. Their parents, Vasile and Agafia Advahov, originated from Gotești and Cîrpești and were teachers at Cahul's pedagogical school. During their high school years at Ciprian Porumbescu High School, they were part of an orchestral group called Mugurașii.

== Career ==
The Advahov Brothers Orchestra was founded in 2005. It was originally meant to be a small group, but eventually grew in popularity and various musicians from the Republic of Moldova and Romania joined it, forming an orchestra. As of 2020, the orchestra contains forty-five instrumentalists.

On 29 January 2022, the song "Trenulețul", a collaboration with folk-rock band Zdob și Zdub, was chosen by Teleradio-Moldova to represent the country at the Eurovision Song Contest 2022 in Turin. They finished in 7th place with 253 points, and came 2nd place in the televote.

== See also ==
- List of music released by Moldovan artists that has charted in major music markets

Preceded by Natalia Gordienko with "Sugar"	Moldova in the Eurovision Song Contest; 2022	Succeeded by Pasha Parfeny with "Soarele și luna"
