= In the Middle (Natalia Barbu song) =

2024 song by Natalia Barbu

Single by Natalia Barbu
- Released: 19 January 2024
- Length: 2:59
- Label: Ragoza
- Songwriters: Khris Richards; Natalia Barbu

Natalia Barbu singles chronology
"Regina Noptilor" (2023)	"In the Middle" (2024)	"Inima" (2024)

Eurovision Song Contest 2024 entry
- Country: Moldova
- Artist: Natalia Barbu
- Language: English

Finals performance
- Semi-final result: 13th
- Semi-final points: 20

Entry chronology
- ◄ "Soarele și Luna" (2023)
- "Viva, Moldova!" (2026) ►

Official performance video
- "In the Middle" (First Semi-Final) on YouTube

"In the Middle" is a song by Moldovan singer Natalia Barbu. The song was written by Barbu and Khris Richards. It was released on 19 January 2024 by Ragoza Music. "In the Middle" represented Moldova in the Eurovision Song Contest 2024, and finished in 13th place with 20 points during semi-final 1.

== Background and composition ==
"In the Middle" was written by Natalia Barbu and Khris Richards. In interviews, Barbu stated that the song was inspired by her children and the feeling of love. The song was written with no expectations, with her claiming that the song instead just came "from my heart". While not written for the Eurovision Song Contest, she was eventually convinced to enter by her producers. She stated that a person's heart, the "light" of the human soul, is "in the middle" of the body, with the song advocating for finding one's true self and connecting with "our divine self".

== Promotion ==
To promote the song, Barbu announced her intents to participate in various Eurovision pre-parties throughout the month of March and April, including Pre-Party ES 2024 on 30 March, the London Eurovision Party 2024 on 7 April, and Eurovision in Concert on 13 April.

== Critical reception ==
In a Wiwibloggs review containing several statements from several critics, the song was rated 5 out of 10 points, earning 34th out of 37 songs on the site's annual ranking. Jon O'Brien of Vulture ranked the song as 17th out of 37, describing it as dramatic and "unlikely to [better]" Barbu's tenth-place result from 2007.

== Eurovision Song Contest ==
=== Etapa națională 2024 ===
Moldova's broadcaster for the Eurovision Song Contest, TeleRadio-Moldova (TRM), organized a 11-entry competition, Etapa națională 2024, to select Moldova's representative for the Eurovision Song Contest 2024. The 11 entries were selected by juries during a 32-entry live audition round. In the grand final, the winner was selected by a 50/50 combination of televoting and juries.

"In the Middle" was officially announced as one of the 32 entries for the live audition round on 26 December 2023. The song was able to move onto the grand final, finishing first out of all entries in the round. In the grand final that took place on 17 February, it drew a total of 22 points, tying with Valeria Pasha's "Anti-Princess". The tiebreaker was determined by jury scores, thus giving the victory to Barbu, winning her the rights to represent Moldova in the Eurovision Song Contest 2024.

After Barbu's victory, Pasha immediately filed an appeal, disputing the voting results. Pasha declared that the rules of the contest were not transparent enough; according to her, the rules did not clarify how the tiebreaker would be determined by televoting or juries, with official rules stating that the tiebreaker would go to "the song receiving the most points". TRM opted to let Barbu's victory stand, with Pasha being accused of having 950 invalid votes.

=== At Eurovision ===
The Eurovision Song Contest 2024 took place at the Malmö Arena in Malmö, Sweden, and consisted of two semi-finals held on the respective dates of 7 and 9 May and the final on 11 May 2024. During the allocation draw on 30 January 2024, Moldova was drawn to compete in the first semi-final, performing in the second half of the show. Barbu competed with a revamped version of "In the Middle", as was included in the contest's official album. Barbu was later drawn to perform 11th in the semi-final, ahead of Finland's Teemu Keisteri and before Azerbaijan's duo of Fahree and Ilkin Dovlatov. For its Eurovision performance, Barbu performed alone, accommodated by a background filled with "seascapes, gardens, trees, flowers, and butterflies". She failed to qualify for the final.

== Release history ==
Release history and format for "In the Middle"
Country	Date	Format(s)	Label	Ref.
Various	19 January 2024	Digital download; streaming	Ragoza Music	
