= Aliona Moon =

Moldovan singer

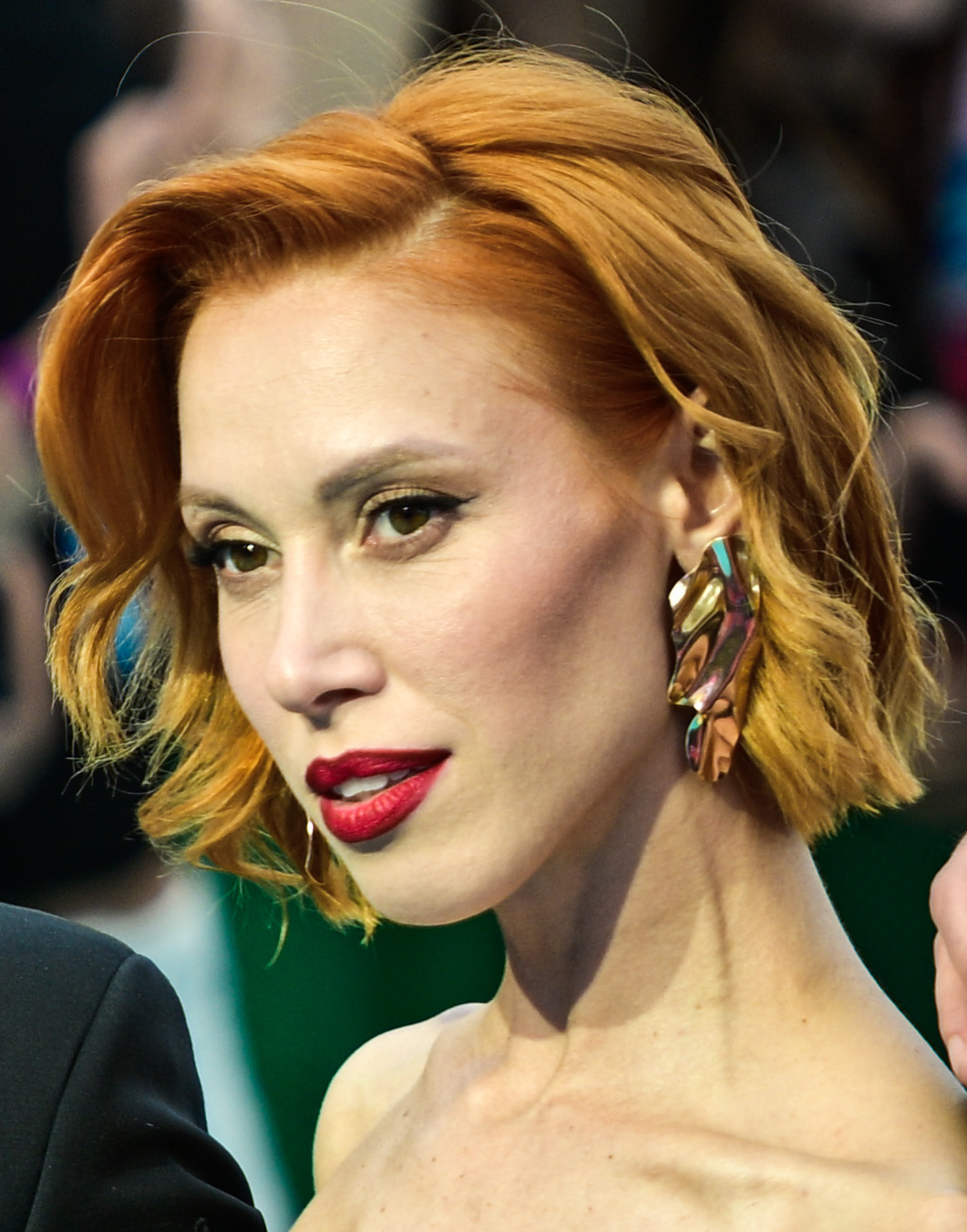
- Moon at Eurovision 2026 Turquoise Carpet

Background information
- Born: Aliona Munteanu; 25 May 1989 (age 37); Chișinău, Moldavian SSR, Soviet Union (present-day Moldova)
- Genre: Pop
- Occupation: Singer
- Instrument: Vocals
- Label: Versus Artist

Aliona Munteanu (born 25 May 1989), better known as Aliona Moon, is a Moldovan singer. In 2012, she was a backing vocalist for Pasha Parfeny, who represented Moldova at the Eurovision Song Contest 2012. Aliona was selected to represent her country in the Eurovision Song Contest 2013 in Malmö with the song "O Mie" composed by Pasha Parfeny. Aliona finished in fourth place in the first semi-final and 11th place in the Eurovision 2013 final. In 2014, she competed on The Voice of Romania, where she finished fourth in the final.

== Biography ==
Video of Aliona Moon presenting herself and her Eurovision Song Contest 2013 song.

Ethnic Moldavian songs and lullabies sung by her mother sparked Aliona's interest in music. Since childhood, Aliona has been a member of several artistic collectives, where she has performed both music and dance.

In 2010, she participated in the second season of Fabrica de Staruri (Moldova's adaptation of Star Academy), where she placed third and earned the title of the public's favourite.

With two of her ex-colleagues from Fabrica de Staruri, Moon formed the pop band Thumbs Up. The band existed for two years before breaking up in 2011. After that, Aliona took some trophies at international musical festivals as a solo artist, most notably at the Martisor Dorohoian and Dan Spătaru festivals, which were held in Romania.

In 2012, she participated in Eurovision in Baku as a backing vocalist for Pasha Parfeny's song, which placed 11th. Pasha returned to Eurovision in 2013, this time as a composer and record producer, and also backed Aliona on the piano, as he did at the national selection final. Although the song was performed in English as "A Million" in the preselection, the Romanian version, "O mie" (A thousand), was performed in the contest.

Moon was originally selected to take part in Etapa națională 2024, the Moldovan national final for the Eurovision Song Contest 2024, with the song "Obosit", written and performed with Milla Danilceac. However, the two withdrew shortly after the list of participants was released.

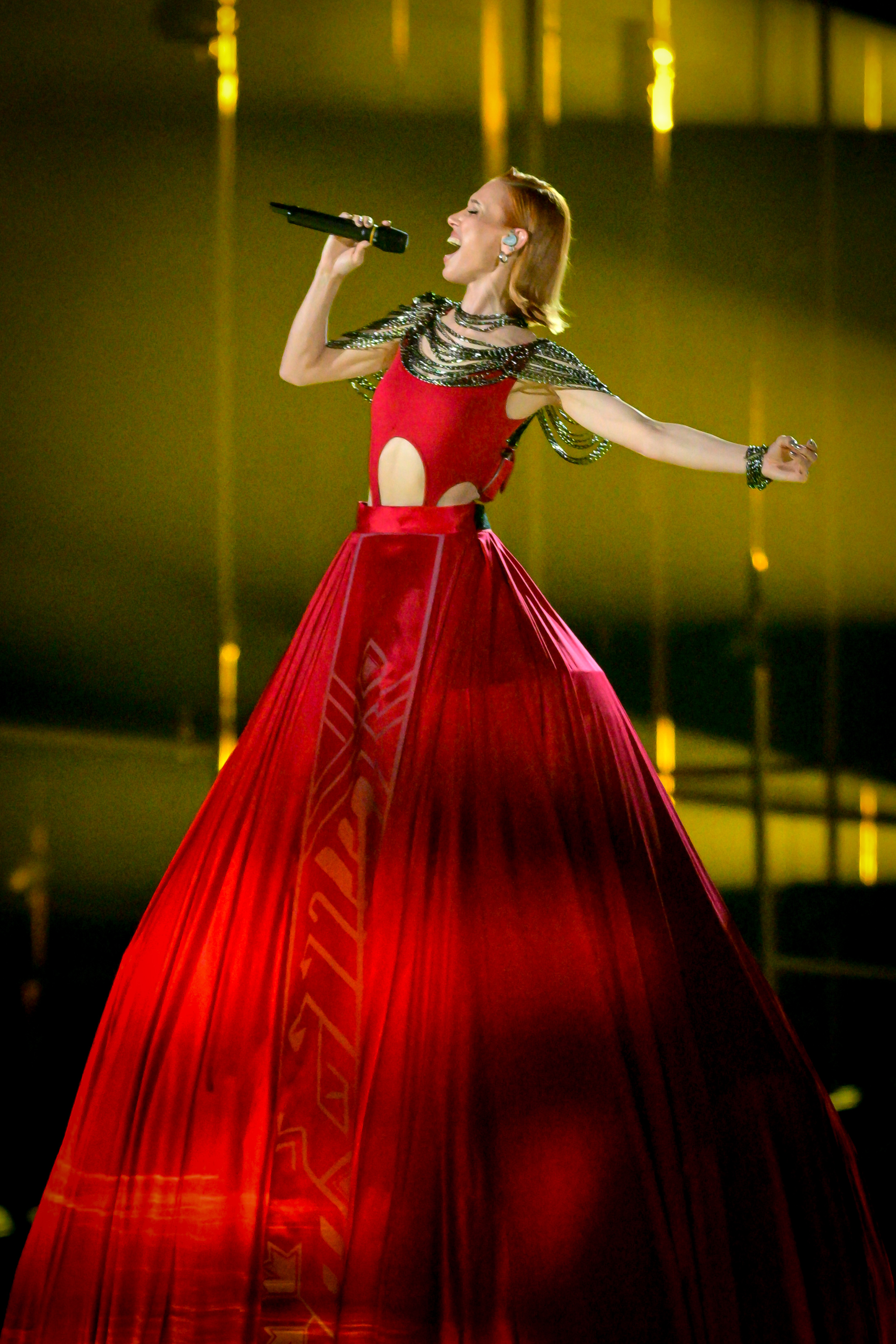
Moon at Eurovision 2026 rehearsal for Satoshi's "Viva, Moldova!" performance.

Moon participated in the Eurovision Song Contest 2026 as one of the backing vocalists for Satoshi, who represented Moldova with the song "Viva, Moldova!", placing eighth in the final.

Preceded by Pasha Parfeny with "Lăutar"	Moldova in the Eurovision Song Contest; 2013	Succeeded by Cristina Scarlat with "Wild Soul"
