= Moldova 2 =

- Logo used since March 2025
- Country: Moldova
- Broadcast area: Moldova
- Headquarters: Chișinău, Moldova

Programming
- Language: Romanian
- Picture format: 576i (16:9 SDTV)

Ownership
- Owner: Teleradio-Moldova
- Sister channels: Moldova 1

History
- Launched: 3 May 2016; 9 years ago

Links
- Website: www.trm.md/ro/moldova-2

Moldova 2 is the second public television channel in Moldova, launched on 3 May 2016 on the 58th anniversary of the state-owned broadcaster Teleradio-Moldova.

The broadcast started with images from the Table Tennis World Cup among journalists of "Press Open Moldova 1". The launch of Moldova 2 came on the recommendation of the European Broadcasting Union, but also to cover large volume of sport content.

== Programming ==
The station broadcasts replays of Moldova 1 and direct broadcasts from sports events, such as the Summer Olympics and the European Football Championship.

== Distribution ==
Moldova 2 is available nationwide via cable networks.

== Logo history ==
Original logo (2016–2018)

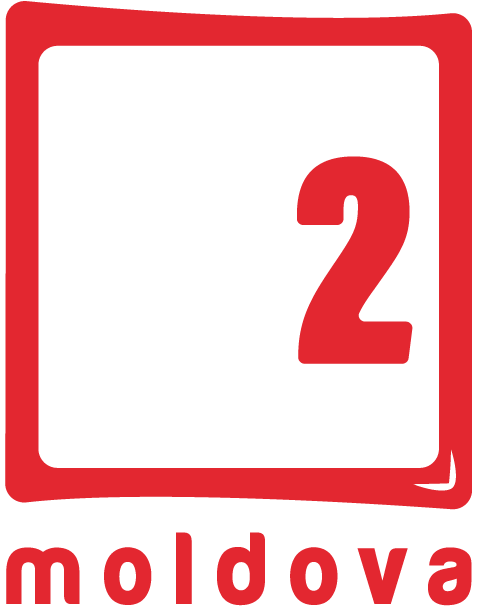
Second logo (2018–2022)

Third logo (2022–2025)
