= Viva, Moldova! =

2026 single by Satoshi

Single by Satoshi
- Language: Romanian
- English title: Long Live Moldova!
- Released: 7 January 2026
- Length: 2:48
- Songwriter: Vlad Sabajuc

Music videos
- "Viva, Moldova!" on YouTube "Viva, Moldova!" (club remix) on YouTube

Alternative covers
- Eurovision version cover

Eurovision Song Contest 2026 entry
- Country: Moldova
- Artist: Satoshi
- Languages: Romanian

Finals performance
- Semi-final result: 4th
- Semi-final points: 208
- Final result: 8th
- Final points: 226

Entry chronology
- ◄ "In the Middle" (2024)

Official performance video
- "Viva, Moldova!" (first semi-final) on YouTube "Viva, Moldova!" (grand final) on YouTube

"Viva, Moldova!" (lit. 'Long Live Moldova!') is a song by Moldovan rapper, singer, and songwriter Satoshi. The song represented Moldova at the Eurovision Song Contest 2026, and finished in eighth place at the final.

== Promotion ==
To promote "Viva, Moldova!" before the Eurovision Song Contest 2026, Satoshi announced his intent to participate in various Eurovision pre-parties. He performed at the Nordic Eurovision Party 2026 held at Rockefeller in Oslo on 21 March 2026. He also participated at Eurovision in Concert 2026, held at AFAS Live Arena in Amsterdam on 11 April 2026. Finally, he performed at the London Eurovision Party 2026, held at Here at Outernet on 19 April 2026.

Prior to his participation in the Eurovision pre-parties, Satoshi performed as an interval act at Vidbir 2026, Ukraine's national selection for the Eurovision Song Contest 2026.

== Critical reception ==
"Viva, Moldova!" was met with generally positive reviews from music critics. Eva Frantz of Yle gave the song a rating of 10 out of 10, describing it as having "deliberately silly song lyrics...mixed with rap and folk music", and called the entry "catchy, different and fun". Jon O'Brien from Vulture ranked the entry sixth out of the 35 entries, calling it an "unashamedly chaotic mix of snake-charming flutes, ’90s breakbeats, and chants tailor-made for belting on a packed soccer terrace". He wrote that the song was "more enlivening" than the official World Cup anthem and "much less obnoxious" than the similarly themed "Tutta l'Italia" by Gabry Ponte.

Glen Weldon of the National Public Radio ranked the entry seventh in his list of the 10 best songs competing at Eurovision 2026, acknowledging that while the line between national pride and nationalism is "historically thin and perilously fraught", he noted that Satoshi's "chest-thumping, foot-stomping, crowd-pleasing, and ultimately good-natured anthem" successfully avoids that pitfall by leaning into a sense of "breathless international inclusivity". In the Norwegian newspaper Dagbladet, Ralf Lofstad gave the song a four out of six, describing its performance as "frenetic and high-energy...that can make you sweat" and "dizzy" due to the camera work. He noted that the "fresh" energy of the performance distracted from the song's "one-sided nationalistic" lyrics and called its staging "simple but effective". Although he felt the entry lacked the quality to win its semi-final, he praised the "catchy, slogan-like chorus" and the inclusion of female vocals as evidence of "OK craftsmanship". In TV 2, Line Haus also gave the entry a four out of six, calling the performance "fantastic", "fun", and "exciting" and applauding Satoshi's rap verses, albeit noting that the singing vocals were shaky.

== Eurovision Song Contest ==
=== Selecția națională 2026 ===
On 17 December 2025, Moldovan broadcaster TRM revealed that "Viva, Moldova!" was one of the 16 finalists for Selecția națională 2026. The show took place later on 17 January 2026. After the voting segment, "Viva, Moldova!" achieved the maximum points from the Moldovan jury, international juries, and the televote, earning Satoshi the right to represent Moldova at the Eurovision Song Contest 2026.

=== At Eurovision ===
The Eurovision Song Contest 2026 took place at Wiener Stadthalle in Vienna, Austria, and consisted of two semi-finals which were held on the respective dates of 12 and 14 May and the final on 16 May 2026. During the allocation draw held on 12 January 2026, Moldova was drawn to compete in the first semi-final, performing in the first half of the show. Satoshi was later drawn to open the semi-final. "Viva, Moldova!" qualified for the grand final.

Satoshi performed a repeat of his performance in the grand final on 16 May. The song performed 16th in the running order, after France's Monroe and before Finland's Linda Lampenius and Pete Parkkonen. It ranked 4th with the televote, 17th with the juries, and overall got 8th place in the grand final with 226 points.

== Charts ==
Chart performance for "Viva, Moldova!"
Chart (2026)	Peak position
Austria (Ö3 Austria Top 40)	15
Finland (Suomen virallinen lista)	21
Greece International (IFPI)	18
Lithuania (AGATA)	12
Moldova Airplay (TopHit)	75
Sweden (Sverigetopplistan)	42
UK Indie Breakers (OCC)	15

== See also ==
- List of music released by Moldovan artists that has charted in major music markets
