= Soarele și luna =

2023 single by Pasha Parfeni

Single by Pasha Parfeni
- Language: Romanian
- Released: 19 January 2023
- Length: 2:59
- Label: Lăutar Music Lab
- Songwriters: Pavel Parfeni; Andrei Vulpe; Iuliana Parfeni

Pasha Parfeni singles chronology
| "Chișinăul" (2022) | "Soarele și luna" (2023) |

Music video
- "Soarele și Luna" on YouTube

Eurovision Song Contest 2023 entry
- Country: Moldova
- Artist: Pasha Parfeni
- Language: Romanian
- Composers: Pavel Parfeni; Andrei Vulpe
- Lyricist: Iuliana Parfeni

Finals performance
- Semi-final result: 5th
- Semi-final points: 109
- Final result: 18th
- Final points: 96

Entry chronology
- ◄ "Trenulețul" (2022)
- "In the Middle" (2024) ►

"Soarele și luna" (Romanian pronunciation: [ˈso̯arele ʃi ˈluna]; transl. "The sun and the moon") is a song by Moldovan singer-songwriter Pasha Parfeni, released on 19 January 2023. The song represented Moldova in the Eurovision Song Contest 2023 after winning Etapa națională 2023, the Moldavian national final for that year's Eurovision Song Contest.

== Eurovision Song Contest ==
=== Etapa națională 2023 ===
Etapa națională 2023 was the national final format developed by TRM in order to select Moldova's entry for the Eurovision Song Contest 2023. The national final took place over three stages. The first stage was a song submission review stage, which took place between 25 January and 27 January 2023 by a jury panel appointed by TRM. Following the review stage, 31 of performers were invited to a live audition process, which took place on 28 January 2023 and broadcast live on TRM 2. Ten audition qualifiers were determined via a 100% jury vote. These performers advanced to the final, which took place on 4 March 2023. The winner was selected via a combination of jury voting and televoting, with an online vote introduced for the first time.

After being announced as one of 31 songs to qualify for the live audition round, the song was drawn to perform 23rd in the round. At the end of the round, it was announced the song had finished second, qualifying for the final round. Heading into the final, the song was considered a favorite to win the final, winning a poll on the Eurovision fan-site Wiwibloggs. At show's end, it was revealed that "Soarele și luna" had won the contest, earning the maximum amount of available of points available, earning 24 points, with 12 points coming from each half of the vote. As a result of winning, the song is set to represent Moldova in the Eurovision Song Contest 2023.

=== At Eurovision ===
According to Eurovision rules, all nations with the exceptions of the host country and the "Big Five" (France, Germany, Italy, Spain and the United Kingdom) are required to qualify from one of two semi-finals in order to compete for the final; the top 10 countries from each semi-final progress to the final. The European Broadcasting Union (EBU) split up the competing countries into six different pots based on voting patterns from previous contests, with countries with favourable voting histories put into the same pot. On 31 January 2023, an allocation draw was held, which placed each country into one of the two semi-finals, and determined which half of the show they would perform in. Moldova has been placed into the first semi-final, to be held on 9 May 2023, and has been scheduled to perform in the second half of the show.

== Charts ==
=== Weekly charts ===
2023 weekly chart performance for "Soarele și luna"
| Chart (2023) | Peak position |
|---|---|
| Finland (Suomen virallinen lista) | 40 |
| Germany Downloads (GfK Entertainment) | 92 |
| Lithuania (AGATA) | 16 |
| Moldova Airplay (TopHit) | 27 |
| Sweden Heatseeker (Sverigetopplistan) | 15 |
| UK Singles Downloads (Official Charts) | 63 |

2025 weekly chart performance for "Soarele și luna"
| Chart (2025) | Peak position |
|---|---|
| Moldova Airplay (TopHit) | 24 |

2026 weekly chart performance for "Soarele și luna"
| Chart (2026) | Peak position |
|---|---|
| Moldova Airplay (TopHit) | 24 |

=== Monthly charts ===
Monthly chart performance for "Soarele și luna"
| Chart (2023) | Peak position |
|---|---|
| Moldova Airplay (TopHit) | 42 |

Monthly chart performance
| Chart (2025) | Peak position |
|---|---|
| Moldova Airplay (TopHit) | 27 |

Monthly chart performance
| Chart (2026) | Peak position |
|---|---|
| Moldova Airplay (TopHit) | 25 |

=== Year-end charts ===
Year-end chart performance
| Chart (2025) | Position |
|---|---|
| Moldova Airplay (TopHit) | 137 |

== See also ==
- List of music released by Moldovan artists that has charted in major music markets
