= Cristina Scarlat =

Moldovan pop singer (born 1981)

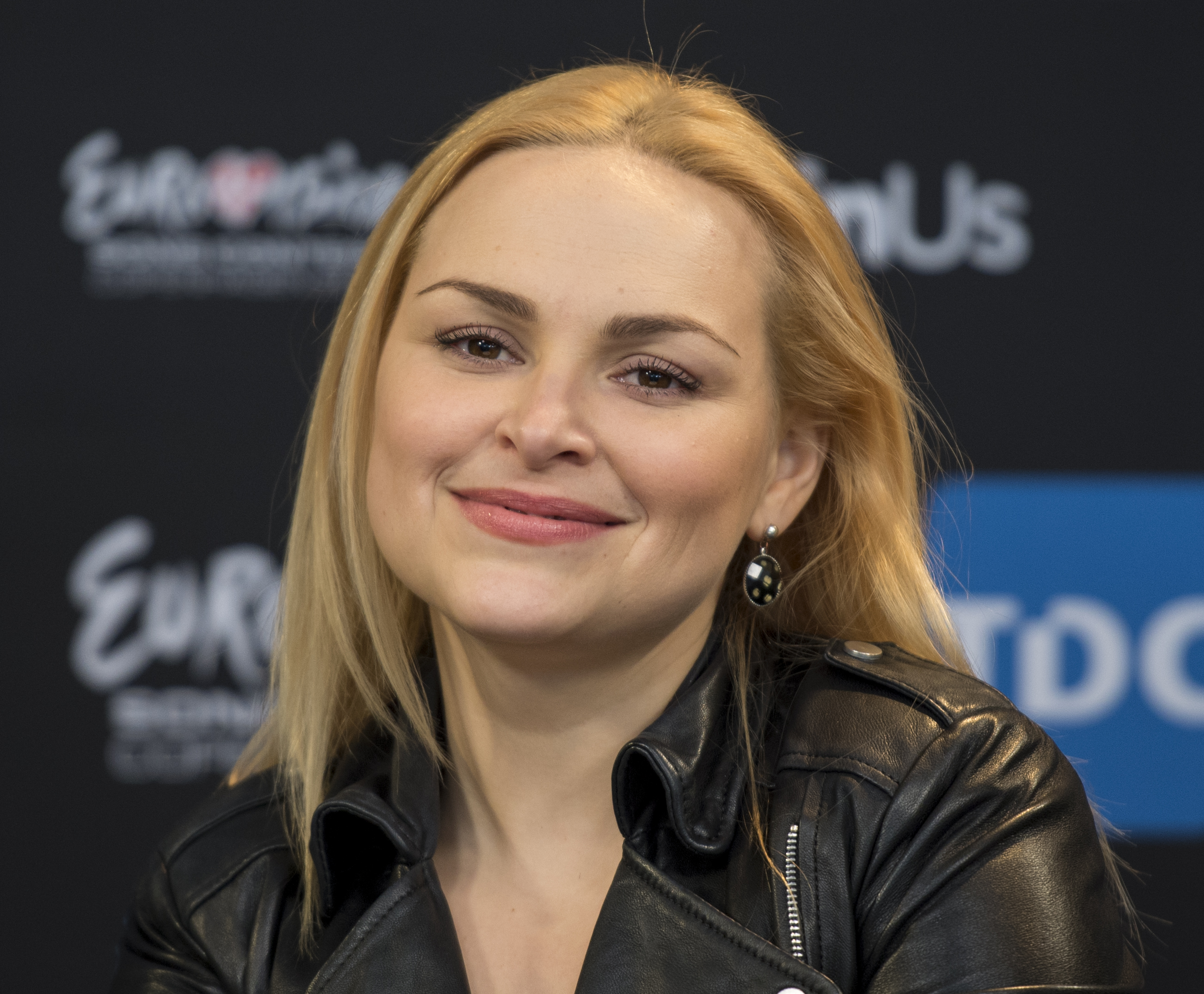
- Scarlat in 2014

Background information
- Born: Cristina Scarlat; 3 March 1981 (age 45); Chișinău, Moldavian SSR
- Genre: Pop
- Occupation: Singer

Cristina Scarlat (Romanian pronunciation: [krisˈtina skarˈlat]; born 3 March 1981) is a Moldovan pop singer. She was born in Chișinău and represented Moldova in the Eurovision Song Contest 2014 in Copenhagen, Denmark, with the song "Wild Soul". She finished last in the semi-final, failing to qualify for the grand final.

Cristina Scarlat presenting herself 2014.

== Eurovision Song Contest ==
Year	O melodie pentru Europa			Eurovision Song Contest			
Year				Semi-final		Final	
Year	Song	Points	Place	Points	Place'	Points	Place
2011	«Every Day Will be Your Day»	2	12				
2013	«I Pray»	17	3				
2014	«Wild Soul»	12	1	13	16	—	

Awards and achievements
Preceded by Aliona Moon with "O mie"	Moldova in the Eurovision Song Contest; 2014	Succeeded by Eduard Romanyuta with "I Want Your Love"
