= Moldova 1 =

Moldovan public TV network

- Logo used since March 2025
- Country: Moldova

Programming
- Languages: Romanian, Gagauz, Russian
- Picture format: 576i (16:9 SDTV)

Ownership
- Owner: Teleradio-Moldova
- Sister channels: Moldova 2

History
- Launched: 30 April 1958; 67 years ago
- Former names: Moldova TV (1958–1993); Canalul 1 (1993–1998); TVM (1998–2002)

Links
- Website: www.trm.md/ro/moldova-1

Availability

Terrestrial
- Freeview

Streaming media
- Moldova 1

Moldova 1 is the national Moldovan television channel, operated by the national public broadcaster, Teleradio-Moldova.

== History ==
Moldova 1 was launched on 30 April 1958, at 7:00 pm, with a welcome speech from the society and party structures. During the first years, it only broadcast twice a week on Friday and Sunday. In 1996, the daily volume of television programs was 13 hours. After multiple variations, the channel now broadcasts round the clock.

On 4 February 2025, Moldova 1 became available in Transnistria.

== Directors ==
- Andrei Timuș (February 1958 – April 1961)
- Mihail Onoicenco (July 1961 – March 1966)
- Ion Podoleanu (March 1966 – March 1968)
- Valentin Șleagun (May 1968 – September 1974)
- Ion Busuioc (August 1975 – December 1988)
- Mihail Strașan (March 1989 – January 1990)
- Constantin Pârțac (January 1990 – April 1994)
- Dumitru Țurcanu (April 1994 – November 1997)
- Iurie Tăbârță (November 1997 – July 1999)
- Arcadie Gherasim (July 1999 – June 2000)
- Anatol Barbei (June 2000 – September 2001)
- Iurie Tăbârță (September 2001 – June 2002)
- Alexandru Grosu (June 2002 – August 2003)
- Sergiu Prodan (August 2003 – October 2003)
- Victor Moraru (January 2004 – April 2004)
- Victor Tăbârță (April 2004 – December 2004)
- Adela Răilean (December 2004 – December 2009)
- Angela Sârbu (February 2010 – February 2012)
- Mircea Surdu (December 2012 – June 2017)
- Ecaterina Stratan (September 2017 – December 2021)
- Corneliu Durnescu (December 2021 – present)

== Current Team Management ==
- Leonid Melnic (General Producer)
- Vitalie Cojocaru (marketing director)
- Alexandru Gutu (Technical Director)

== Logos ==
2005–2010 logo

2010–2016 logo

2016–2018 logo

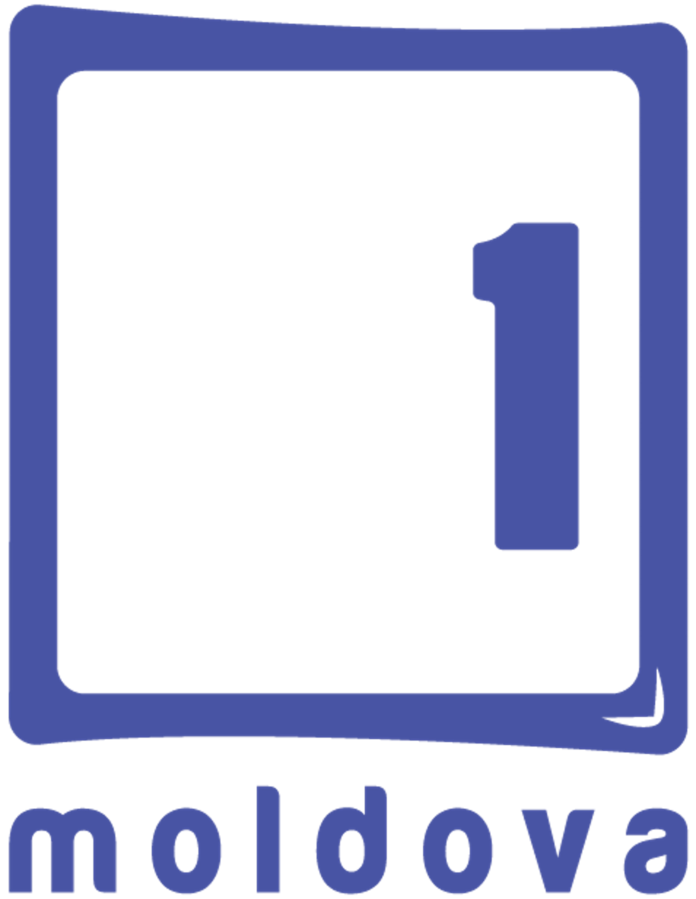
2018–2022 logo

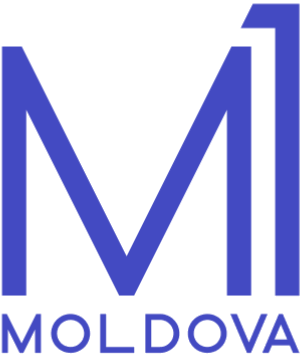
2022–2025 logo

== See also ==
- Union of Journalists of Moldova
