= Teleradio-Moldova =

Public broadcaster of Moldova

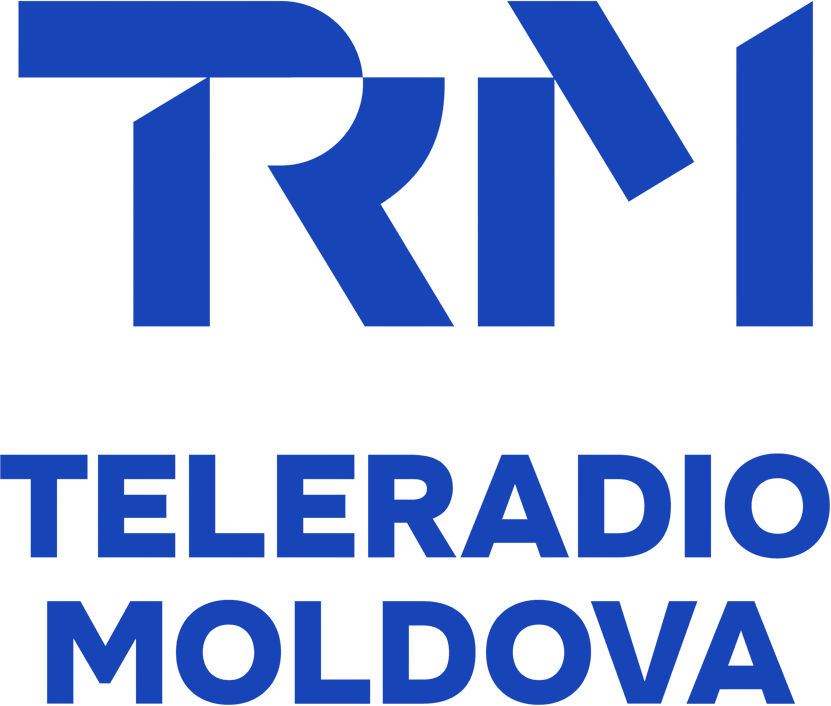
- Logo used since March 2025
- Type: Radio and television
- Country: Moldova
- Availability: International
- TV stations: Moldova 1 Moldova 2
- Radio stations: Radio Moldova; Radio Moldova Muzical; Radio Moldova Tineret; Radio Moldova Comrat
- Headquarters: Chișinău
- Owner: Government of Moldova
- Launch date: 8 October 1939; 86 years ago (as Radio Basarabia)
- Former names: Radioteleviziunea Nationala din Moldova
- Official website: trm.md

Teleradio-Moldova (TRM) is the Moldovan state-owned national radio and television broadcaster. It owns two television channels and three radio stations. TRM was admitted as a full active member of the European Broadcasting Union on 1 January 1993, under its former name Radioteleviziunea Nationala din Moldova (RTNM).

== History ==
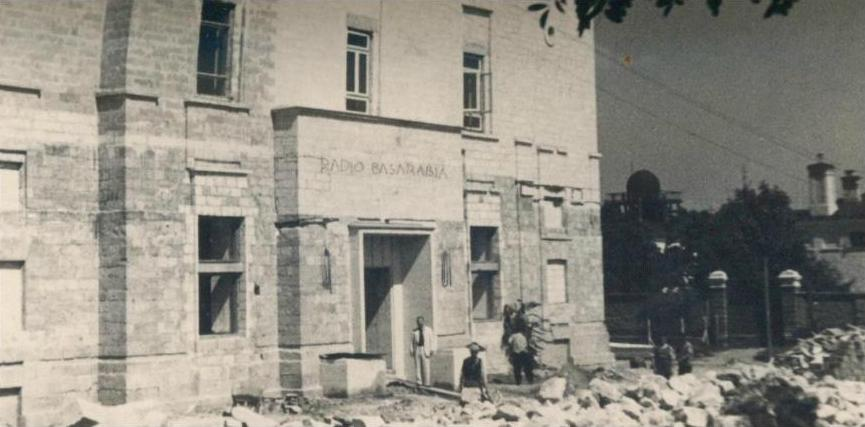
Radio Basarabia under construction in Chișinău in 1937

The first radio transmission in Moldova was broadcast on November 1, 1928 by the Radiotelephonic Broadcasting Company in Bucharest. On 30 October 1930, in Tiraspol started broadcasting a Soviet radio station of 4 kW whose main purpose was the anti-Romanian propaganda to Moldova between Prut and Dniester. A new radio mast, M. Gorky, built in 1936 in Tiraspol, allowed a greater coverage of the territory of Bessarabia. In that context, in 1937, Chişinău City Hall gave the Romanian Radio Broadcasting Company a building to open the first radio station in Chişinău, to counter Soviet propaganda. Experimental programs began in the early days of June 1939. The transmitter installed by Marconi Company in Chişinău was the best in Romania. The first radio station in Chişinău was "twice stronger than that of Bucharest or that one in Tiraspol" wrote Gazeta Basarabiei in July 1939.

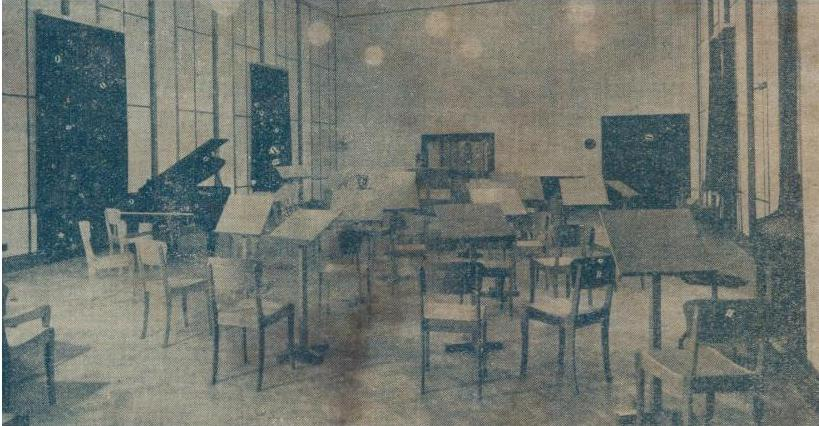
Radio Basarabia in 1940

The company was launched on 8 October 1939, as Radio Basarabia, the second radio station of the Romanian Radio Broadcasting Company. On October 8, 1939, Radio Basarabia (with own shows in Romanian and Russian) was launched in Chişinău by the Romanian Radio Broadcasting Company. A religious service was broadcast from the Nativity Cathedral at the launching of the first radio station in Chişinău. Emission power could be increased from 20 kW to 200 kW and the reception was possible in Moscow or Leningrad due to direct wave propagation. There were three studios, the biggest for symphony orchestras, choirs and opera band, the middle for chamber music and soloists, and the third allocated to lecturers and announcer, equipped with the most modern equipment. Radio Bessarabia had six services: the Secretariat, Technical Service, Service Programs, Administrative Service, Litigation department, and Commercial department. With the Soviet occupation in June 1940 most of the backup material, personnel and the archive were withdrawn at Huși, but not the transmitter. The Red Army blew up the building and the bodies of those who remained to work for the radio were found in a water well.

In 1958, Nicolae Lupan became Teleradio-Moldova's first editor in chief.

== Services ==
=== Radio ===
- Radio Moldova: founded on 8 October 1939 as "Radio Bessarabia", Radio Moldova is the public radio station. Its programming is informative.
- Radio Moldova Tineret: station aimed at young audiences, with music and magazine programmes.
- Radio Moldova Muzical: radio specialized in classical and academic music.
- Radio Moldova Comrat: regional radio for Gagauzia, based in Comrat

From 1992 to 2013 there was an international version (Radio Moldova Internațional) that offered programs in Russian, Romanian, English, French and Spanish.

=== Television ===
- Moldova 1: Founded on April 30, 1958, Its programming is general.
- Moldova 2: Opened in 2016, it is an alternative to the first channel.

TRM also had its own international channel, TV Moldova Internațional, that launched in January 2007 but was closed in January 2013 for financial reasons.

== Leadership ==
On December 31, 2009, the Supervisory Board of Teleradio-Moldova dismissed the director of Radio Moldova, Veaceslav Gheorghişenco, after on December 30 they dismissed the company's chairman, Valentin Todercan, and the director of Moldova 1, Adela Răileanu. The board's members grounded their decision on the fact that over the past years the company turned into a political instrument, violated the right to expression and the principle of impartiality and pluralism of opinions. Also, the Supervisory Board announced a contest for these vacancies.

Constantin Marin became the new head of "Teleradio-Moldova". Since 2004, he was principal of the Journalism and Communication Sciences faculty at State University of Moldova. Before, he was editor-in-chief at Radio Moldova Internațional and superior lector at History of Journalism department. He is the author of "The Civil Society between Political Myth and Social Plea", "Institutional Communication" and "Community Development and Participation".

=== Directors ===
- Feodosie Vidraşcu (1957–1961)
- Vladimir Croitoru (1961–1965)
- Leonid Culiuc (1965–1967)
- Ştefan Lozan (1967–1989)
- Adrian Usatîi (1989–1997)
- Tudor Olaru (1997–2000)
- Iulian Magaleas (2000–2003)
- Ion Gonţa (2002–2003)
- Artur Efremov (June 2003 – March 2004)
- Ilie Teleşcu (March 2004 – April 2007)
- Valentin Todercan (10 April 2007 – 30 December 2009)
- Constantin Marin (5 February 2010 – November 2014)
- Olga Bordeianu (4 June 2015 – November 2021)
- Vlad Țurcanu (3 December 2021 – Present)

=== Editors in chief ===
- Nicolae Lupan
- Valeriu Saharneanu (1991–1994)

== See also ==
- Union of Journalists of Moldova
- Străşeni TV Mast
