= Nikos Sofis =

Greek sports manager and songwriter

- Born: May 10, 1992 (age 34); Munich, Germany
- Education: American College of Greece
- Occupations: Sports manager; songwriter
- Years active: 2011–present (songwriter); 2014–present (sports manager)

Nikolaos "Nikos" Sofis (Greek: Νικόλαος "Νίκος" Σοφής; born 10 May 1992) is a Greek sports manager and lyricist, from Larissa, Greece. He used to serve as vice president for Greek Super League club AEL and as an advisor to Super League 2 club Kavala. Currently he holds the position as area manager for Greece and Cyprus on football portal Transfermarkt, as well as a minor investor in Slovenian football club NK Tabor Sežana. Since 2011, he also is engaged in songwriting, best known for his bids in the Eurovision Song Contest. In 2019, together with Sebastian Ekstrand, he formed the EDM pop project VoColor.

== Personal life ==
Born in Munich, Germany, and growing up close by to Frankfurt, he attended the Frankfurt International School from where he graduated in 2011. In 2013, he attended the EU Business School in Barcelona, Spain, where he began his sports management studies. In 2014, he continued his studies at the American College of Greece in Athens from where he obtained a bachelor's degree in 2018. He is fluent in Greek, German, and English.

== Sports management ==
=== AEL ===
2016–2018

On 9 September 2016, Greek Super League team AEL proposed the inclusion of Sofis into the executive board to its stakeholders. As of 24 September 2016, Sofis has been elected and announced as third vice president. The team managed to reach the goals set by the administrative board, which expected the team to not get relegated and remain in the Superleague.

During the 2017–18 season, AEL managed an impressive run in the Greek Cup, making it to the semi-finals. The team was eventually eliminated by AEK Athens through the away goals rule. On 4 October 2017, Sofis announced his resignation as vice president. However, on 24 November 2017, Sofis got announced as member of the newly formed executive board. On 23 September 2018, Sofis announced his resignation from the position he was holding at the club.

=== Kavala ===
From 1 January 2022 until 30 June 2022, Sofis has been acting as an advisor to Super League 2 club Kavala.

=== Transfermarkt ===
As of August 2023, Sofis took over as area manager for Greece and Cyprus at football portal Transfermarkt.

=== NK Tabor Sežana ===
Sofis has revealed via his personal Facebook account, that as of the beginning of January 2025, he became a minor investor in the Slovenian football club NK Tabor Sežana, currently playing in the Slovenian Second League.

== Songwriting ==
Songwriting
- Genres: Pop; rock; AOR; hard rock
- Occupation: Lyricist
- Years active: 2011–present

Since 2011, Sofis also has been engaged in songwriting, best known for his bids in the Eurovision Song Contest. During the years he has collaborated with a variety of songwriters and artists from across Europe. From 2019 until 2022, he was the main lyricist for Polish rock band Clödie. From March 2021 until January 2025, he collaborated with Italian record label Frontiers Music.

=== Entries in Eurovision Song Contest pre-selections ===
2014

- "Love Will Find a Way" by Ovidiu Anton (Romania 2014)

2015

- "Alive" by Alen Hit (Belarus 2015)
- "Unshakable" by Anewta C (Moldova 2015)
- "C'est Moi" by Ryan Axisa (Switzerland 2015)

2016

- "Never Let Go" by Anna Gulko (Moldova 2016), 12th place (semi-final)
- "Take Me Far" by Omar Naber (Switzerland 2016)

2017

- "Let's Make a Party" by Alen Hit (Belarus 2017)
- "Run" by Audrius Janonis (Lithuania 2017), 8th place (first round)
- "Gave You Everything" by Dana Rogovski (Moldova 2017)
- "If I Could" by Max Fall (Moldova 2017)

2018

- "Dying Inside" by Valdas Lacko (Lithuania 2018), 10th place (first round)
- "Black Heart" by Vera Țurcanu (Moldova 2018), 2nd place
- "Don't Leave Me Out" by Tomasz Trzeszczyński (Poland 2018)

2019

- "Stop Breathing" by Angelika Pushnova (Belarus 2019)
- "Þú bætir mig" ("Make Me Whole") by Ívar Daníels (Iceland 2019), 3rd place (semi-final)
- "Cold" by Vera Țurcanu (Moldova 2019), 3rd place
- "Devil in Disguise" by Clödie (Poland 2019)

2020

- "True Love" by Angelika Pushnova (Belarus 2020), 6th place
- "Every Hour" by July (Belarus 2020)
- "Die For You" by Catarina Sandu (Moldova 2020), 4th place
- "Take Control" by Maxim Zavidia (Moldova 2020), 3rd place

2021

- "Braids" by Kazna (Belarus 2021)

2022

- "Silent Battlefield" by Ana Cernicova (Moldova 2022), 2nd place
- "Starlight" by Marcela Scripcaru (Moldova 2022)
- "Ready" by Maxim Zavidia (Moldova 2022), 4th place

2023

- "Vremea ta" by Vera (Moldova 2023), 17th place (auditions)

2024

- "Contrasens" by Reghina Alexandrina (Moldova 2024), 6th place
- "Breathing Underwater" by Kurt Anthony (San Marino 2024), 6th place (semi-final)

2025

- "Demons" by Cătălina Solomac (Moldova 2025)

2026

- "Pink Margarita" by Cătălina Solomac (Moldova 2026), 3rd place

=== Additional contest participations ===
2014

- "C'est Moi" by Ryan Axisa (New Talent Song Contest), 3rd place

2015

- "C'est Moi" by Ryan Axisa (Summer Hit Song Contest), 16th place
- "Alive" by Alen Hit (YourSong Online Contest), 1st place

=== Further songwriting credits ===
2016

- "Stand" by Adrian Aron
- "Come to Me" by Sebastian Ekstrand

2017

- "Hold On" by Sebastian Ekstrand feat. Tobias Österblom
- "The Whole World" by Litesound
- "Gravity" by Invaders + Dana Rogovski
- "Conquer My Heart" by Alen Hit

2018

- "Breaking the Tide" by Escape the Day
- "Invisible" by Phrenia
- "Hypnotized" by Samra
- "Pretty Little Liar" by OTREYA

2019

- "Tears & Blood" by Michael W.
- "Fire Burns Within" by Clödie
- "Let Me Go" by Clödie
- "Savior" by VoColor

2020

- "Contagious" by Kristel Lisberg
- "Until the End" by VoColor + Eldar
- "Against the World" by Clödie
- "Come to Me (2020 Pop Edit)" by Sebastian Ekstrand
- "Shake It" by SunStroke Project feat. Fox Banger

2021

- "Sins" by Clödie
- "Cause I Love You" by AROW & Mary Lil
- "Invincible" by Mattias Törnell
- "When the Sun Shines" by Avenue Sky
- "You Are the One" by Clödie
- "Home" by VoColor + Kenny Duerlund
- "Hold On" by Clödie
- "Stars" by Julian Lesiński
- "Keep Fighting" by Teodora Dinu

2022

- "Angel Without Wings" by Lionville
- "Illogical" by VoColor
- "My Rock & Roll" by Ginevra
- "Dusk Till Dawn" by Clödie

2023

- "Don't Wait For Love" by Khymera
- "Runaway" by Khymera
- "Nights" by T3nors
- "Silent Cries" by T3nors
- "Torn" by T3nors
- "Beautiful Crime" by Darya
- "Falling" by Mecca
- "Your Way" by Mecca
- "Sacred" by Revolution Saints
- "My Own Hope" by Robledo
- "Next in Line" by Russell – Guns
- "Tell Me Why" by Russell – Guns

2024

- "Coming Down" by Russell – Guns
- "Where I Belong" by Russell – Guns
- "For You" by Russell – Guns
- "Give Me the Night" by Russell – Guns
- "Living a Lie" by Russell – Guns
- "In and Out of Love" by Russell – Guns
- "Medusa" by Russell – Guns
- "Back Into Your Arms Again" by Russell – Guns
- "I Want You" by Russell – Guns
- "Ready (Acoustic Version)" by Maxim Zavidia
- "Warrior's Anthem" by Cleanbreak
- "Unbreakable" by Cleanbreak
- "Never Gone" by Cleanbreak
- "Breathless" by Cleanbreak
- "Love Again" by Cleanbreak
- "Without You" by Sunstorm

2026

- "Ypsilos" by Vasilis Lekkas
- "Nightmare" by Isabell Otrebus

== VoColor ==
VoColor
- Origin: Sweden; Greece
- Genres: Pop; EDM
- Years active: 2019–2023
- Members: Sebastian Ekstrand; Nikos Sofis

VoColor was a Swedish-Greek EDM pop project formed in 2019, consisting of Swedish singer-songwriter Sebastian Ekstrand and Greek lyricist Nikos Sofis.

Ekstrand and Sofis first met and started working in early-2016, resulting in Ekstrand's solo single "Come To Me". With both sides being satisfied with the collaboration, Sofis involved Ekstrand on the song "If I Could" for Moldovan artist Max Fall, a song that was submitted to represent Moldova in the Eurovision Song Contest 2017. The same year, the two worked on Ekstrand's next solo single, "Hold On". During the same year, Ekstrand involved Sofis into the writing process of Escape the Day's comeback single "Breaking the Tide", released in early-2018. Ekstrand and Sofis have also worked together on the song "Hypnotized", released in 2018, by popular Azerbaijani pop star Samra. In 2019, Ekstrand and Sofis collaborated once again and wrote the song "Stop Breathing" for Angelika Pushnova, who tried to represent Belarus in the Eurovision Song Contest 2019.

In late-2019, Ekstrand and Sofis decided to form VoColor and released their debut single "Savior" on 6 December 2019. Following the release of the debut single, on 10 April 2020 VoColor released the remix EP, Savior: Remixed, containing five alternate versions of the song. On 22 May 2020, they released their second single, "Until the End", featuring Eurovision Song Contest 2011 winner Eldar from Azerbaijan. An orchestral remix of "Until the End" was released on 4 December. On New Year's Eve, VoColor released the Until the End EP, containing all of the previously released versions of the song as well as the previously unreleased instrumental version. On 24 September 2021, they released their third single "Home" with Danish singer Kenny Duerlund. On 17 June 2022, the duo released their fourth single "Illogical".

=== Members ===
- Sebastian Ekstrand – vocals, production (2019–2023)
- Nikos Sofis – lyrics, production (2019–2023)

=== Discography ===
==== Extended plays ====
- 2020: Savior: Remixed
- 2020: Until the End
- 2025: Journey

==== Singles ====
- 2019: "Savior"
- 2020: "Until the End" (with Eldar)
- 2021: "Home" (with Kenny Duerlund)
- 2022: "Illogical"

==== Promotional singles ====
- 2020: "Savior (RÆVHEN Remix)"
- 2020: "Until the End (Zerotonine Remix)" (with Eldar)
- 2020: "Until the End (Austin Leeds Remix)" (with Eldar)
- 2020: "Until the End (Orchestral Remix)" (with Eldar)
- 2022: "Home (Neutrophic Remix)" (with Kenny Duerlund)
