= Eurovision: Come Together =

2020 BBC television programme

Date and venue
- Final: 16 May 2020
- Venue: Television Centre; London, United Kingdom

Production
- Broadcaster: British Broadcasting Corporation (BBC)
- Director: Stephen Neal
- Executive producer: Andrew Cartmell; Mel Balac
- Presenters: Graham Norton

Participants
- Number of entries: 19

Vote
- Voting system: 100% online voting
- Winning song: "Waterloo" by ABBA

Eurovision: Come Together was a one-off television programme, organised and broadcast by the British Broadcasting Corporation (BBC), to determine the most popular song in the history of the Eurovision Song Contest, as voted for by the British public. Hosted by Graham Norton, the show was broadcast from Television Centre, London on 16 May 2020, and served as a local alternative for the Eurovision Song Contest 2020, which was cancelled due to the COVID-19 pandemic. Nineteen past Eurovision entries, chosen by an assembled jury, took part in the event, with the winner determined by online voting. The competition was won by "Waterloo", originally performed by ABBA, who won Eurovision for Sweden in 1974.

== Background ==
The Eurovision Song Contest 2020, which was planned to be held in Rotterdam, Netherlands on 12, 14, and 16 May 2020, was cancelled on 18 March 2020 by the contest organisers, the European Broadcasting Union (EBU) and the Dutch host broadcasters NPO, NOS, and AVROTROS, following the outbreak of COVID-19 in Europe.

As part of a wide range of new programming commissioned following the cancellation of several arts and entertainment events as a result of the pandemic, the BBC announced on 24 March 2020 that it would commission a special Eurovision broadcast, titled Eurovision: Come Together. The special would be produced by BBC Studios for BBC One, and feature past Eurovision performances from throughout the years, interviews, and a display of what had been anticipated for the 2020 contest.

The EBU, NPO, NOS and AVROTROS later confirmed that they would organise an official replacement programme to the 2020 contest, entitled Eurovision: Europe Shine a Light and broadcast live from Hilversum on 16 May 2020, the day on which the final would have taken place. Initial reports suggested that the BBC would air Eurovision: Come Together on BBC One at the same time, with Europe Shine a Light being offered to UK viewers instead through BBC iPlayer. The BBC programming schedule for Eurovision, released on 1 May 2020, confirmed that Europe Shine a Light would be broadcast live on BBC One, with Graham Norton providing commentary, and that Eurovision: Come Together would be shown immediately before. This press release also confirmed that Eurovision: Come Together would give viewers the opportunity to take part in a live vote.

== Selection process ==
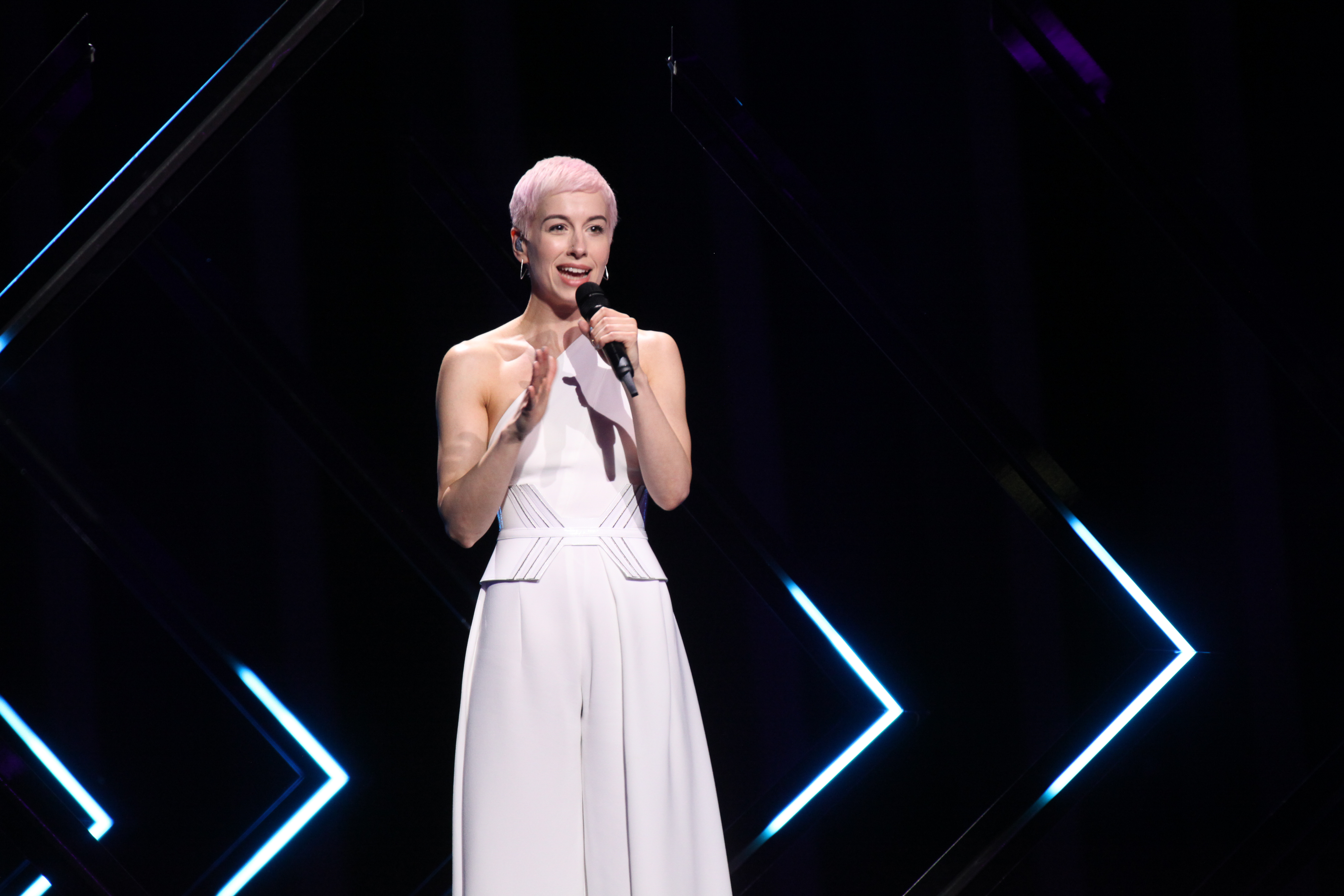
SuRie, who represented the United Kingdom in the 2018 contest, was a member of the show's selection panel.

The shortlist of competing entries for the competitive aspect of the programme was determined by a group of assembled individuals with a connection to Eurovision. The membership of the panel included British broadcasters and journalists, former UK Eurovision contestants, as well as members of the Eurovision fandom and contributors to Eurovision fansites.

Panelists were asked to select ten Eurovision songs from the history of the Eurovision Song Contest, including all songs that had taken part in the contest before 2020. Any entries which were to have competed at the 2020 contest were ineligible. The criteria against which the panelists were asked to rate the entries outlined that the songs selected should be "modern day classics" that "have stood the test of time", taking into account the performance, including live vocals and staging, and song composition. Any entry in which an individual panelist was involved in its original performance, either directly as singer or songwriter, or in a behind-the-scenes role, such as vocal coach or publicist, was ineligible for selection by that panelist.

The selection panel consisted of the following 18 members:

- Rylan Clark-Neal – Eurovision semi-final television commentator for the BBC
- Scott Mills – Eurovision semi-final television commentator for the BBC
- Mel Giedroyc – Eurovision: You Decide host and former Eurovision semi-final television commentator for the BBC
- Ken Bruce – Eurovision radio commentator for BBC Radio 2
- Adele Roberts – BBC Radio 1 DJ and UK Eurovision jury member in 2019
- Mark De-Lisser – Vocal coach
- Nicki French – represented the United Kingdom in 2000 and London Eurovision Party co-host
- Paul Jordan, a.k.a. Dr. Eurovision – Eurovision pundit
- Heidi Stephens – TV blogger for The Guardian
- Steve Holden – Music reporter for BBC Radio 1's Newsbeat
- Mandy Norman – Eurovision fan
- Alasdair Rendall – President of OGAE UK
- Sarah Cawood – Former Eurovision semi-final television commentator for the BBC
- SuRie – represented the United Kingdom in 2018
- Joel – Eurovision fan, featured in the BBC's online content for the Eurovision Song Contest 2019
- William Lee Adams – Eurovision blogger for Wiwibloggs
- Zoe London – DJ and Eurovision fan
- Lucy Percy – Eurovision blogger for Wiwibloggs

== Participants ==
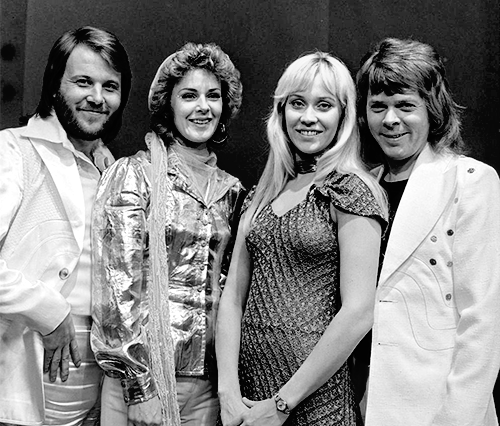
"Waterloo" by ABBA (pictured), the winning song from the 1974 contest, was declared the winner following an online vote.

The list of participating entries was revealed by the BBC on 15 May 2020. Footage of the original performances for each entry from their original contests was shown. Voting took place via the BBC website; a BBC account was required to vote, and each account holder was able to cast up to three votes. The winner was revealed at the end of the live show, and the top ten were announced on the BBC website following the event's completion.

R/O	Year	Country	Artist	Song	Language	Place
1	2015	Sweden	Måns Zelmerlöw	"Heroes"	English	5
2	1998	Israel	Dana International	"Diva"	Hebrew	–
3	2016	Australia	Dami Im	"Sound of Silence"	English	–
4	1981	United Kingdom	Bucks Fizz	"Making Your Mind Up"	English	8
5	2018	Cyprus	Eleni Foureira	"Fuego"	English	–
6	1965	Luxembourg	France Gall	"Poupée de cire, poupée de son"	French	–
7	2012	Sweden	Loreen	"Euphoria"	English	3
8	2007	Ukraine	Verka Serduchka	"Dancing Lasha Tumbai"	German, English, Ukrainian, Russian	7
9	2019	Italy	Mahmood	"Soldi"	Italian	–
10	1974	Sweden	ABBA	"Waterloo"	English	1
11	2015	Belgium	Loïc Nottet	"Rhythm Inside"	English	–
12	1996	United Kingdom	Gina G	"Ooh Aah... Just a Little Bit"	English	10
13	2010	Germany	Lena	"Satellite"	English	–
14	1958	Italy	Domenico Modugno	"Nel blu, dipinto di blu"	Italian	–
15	2018	Israel	Netta	"Toy"	English	–
16	1976	United Kingdom	Brotherhood of Man	"Save Your Kisses for Me"	English	9
17	2014	Austria	Conchita Wurst	"Rise Like a Phoenix"	English	2
18	2009	Norway	Alexander Rybak	"Fairytale"	English	6
19	1997	United Kingdom	Katrina and the Waves	"Love Shine a Light"	English	4

== Interval ==
Additional content was produced and broadcast following the performances of the competing acts and during the voting period. A pre-recorded interview conducted by Graham Norton with James Newman, the UK representative for the 2020 contest was shown, along with a pre-recorded acoustic performance of his intended Eurovision entry "My Last Breath". Music videos for a number of the entries which were set to compete at the 2020 contest were also featured.

As part of an open call for submissions by the BBC, footage was shown of Eurovision fans and former Eurovision entrants recreating moments from Eurovision history. Applicants could record themselves performing to one of the specified former Eurovision entries and could submit their footage to the BBC for inclusion in the show. The featured songs which applicants could recreate were:

- "Run Away" by SunStroke Project and Olia Tira – represented Moldova in 2010, notable for launching the "Epic Sax Guy" meme.
- "Boom Bang-a-Bang" by Lulu – won Eurovision for the United Kingdom in 1969
- "Party for Everybody" by Buranovskiye Babushki – represented Russia in 2012
- (Republic of Ireland) "Waterline" by Jedward – represented Ireland in 2012
- "Flying the Flag (For You)" by Scooch – represented the United Kingdom in 2007
- "Spirit in the Sky" by Keiino – represented Norway in 2019
- "Alcohol Is Free" by Koza Mostra and Agathonas Iakovidis – represented Greece in 2013
- "Congratulations" by Cliff Richard – represented the United Kingdom in 1968

== See also ==
- Eurovision: Europe Shine a Light
- Der kleine Song Contest
- Die Grand Prix Hitliste
- Free European Song Contest
- Eurovision 2020 – das deutsche Finale
- Sveriges 12:a
