= Moldova in the Eurovision Song Contest 2025 =

- Eurovision Song Contest 2025
- Participating broadcaster: Teleradio-Moldova (TRM)
- Country: Moldova
- Selection process: Etapa națională 2025 (cancelled)

Placement
- Semi-final result: Withdrawn

Participation chronology

Moldova was set to be represented at the Eurovision Song Contest 2025. The Moldovan participating broadcaster, Teleradio-Moldova (TRM), had planned to organise the national final Etapa națională 2025 in order to select its entry for the contest. On 22 January 2025, TRM announced its withdrawal from the contest and the cancellation of Etapa națională, citing economic reasons and the quality of the national final.

== Background ==
Prior to the 2025 contest, Teleradio-Moldova (TRM) had participated in the Eurovision Song Contest representing Moldova nineteen times since its first entry in 2005. Its best placing in the contest was third, achieved in 2017 with the song "Hey, Mamma!" performed by SunStroke Project. To this point, it had achieved a top ten placing at the contest four times: in 2005 when "Boonika bate toba" performed by Zdob și Zdub placed sixth, in 2007 when "Fight" performed by Natalia Barbu placed tenth, in 2018 when "My Lucky Day" performed by DoReDoS also placed tenth, and in 2022 when Zdob și Zdub returned to compete for a third time together with the Advahov Brothers and placed seventh with the song "Trenulețul". In 2024, Natalia Barbu returned to compete for a second time where her song "In the Middle" failed to qualify to compete in the final.

As part of its duties as participating broadcaster, TRM organises the selection of its entry in the Eurovision Song Contest and broadcasts the event in the country. TRM confirmed its intentions to participate at the 2025 contest on 16 November 2024. The broadcaster has used various methods to select its entry in the past, such as a national selection show or via an internal selection. On 19 November 2024, TRM announced that it would hold a national final to select its entry for the 2025 contest.

== Before Eurovision ==
=== Etapa națională 2025 ===
Etapa națională 2025 was the planned national final format developed by TRM to select its entry for the Eurovision Song Contest 2025. The event would have included a final to be held on 22 February 2025 and broadcast on Moldova 1.

==== Competing entries ====
Artists and composers were able to submit their entries between 19 November 2024 and 27 December 2024. Artists could submit more than one song, and an international act was able to compete only if they were part of a duo or group where 50% of the lead vocalists were of Moldovan nationality. At the conclusion of the submission deadline, 30 valid entries were received by the broadcaster.

On 13 January 2025, the list of the 29 artists and songs participating in the audition round was released by TRM. Among the selected competing artists was Anton Ragoza as a member of Carnival Brain, who previously represented Moldova in 2010 and 2017 as a member of SunStroke Project. On 16 January, Eblansh Band withdrew from the competition, with the listed reason being that one of their team members was hospitalised in Romania, however, there have been accusations that the band doesn't exist, and the song was generated using artificial intelligence by a group of pranksters. Head of Delegation Daniela Crudu responded to media questions on whether the song was AI generated, stating that: "the songs were not analyzed on whether they were made with artificial intelligence. That is for the jury to do at the live auditions". Additionally, Anna G, Dan Alexandrov and Valleria did not perform during the live audition round despite originally being on the participants list; Valleria is known to have been disqualified due to late arrival at the venue, while the others did not specify the reasons for their absence.

The live audition round took place on 18 January 2025 at the TRM Studio 2 in Chișinău and broadcast on Moldova 1, with 12 finalists selected by a jury panel to advance to the final of Etapa națională 2025.

Key: Selected for the final Entry withdrawn or disqualified

Results of the live audition round – 18 January 2025
R/O	Artist	Song	Songwriter(s)
1	Diana Elmas	"Fly Away"	Linda Persson; Mats Larsson; Peter Nord; Ylva Persson
2	Sasha Khanedanyan	"Silent Hills"	Sasha Khanedanyan
3	Nr.11	"Bye"	Nadejda Rotaru
4	Nordika	"Ludmila"	Ruslan Țăranu
5	Royals ST	"Zboară-n sus"	Paul Gamurari; Anatol Vornicescu
6	Tudor Bumbac	"Pace noi vrem"	Daniela Bumbac; Tudor Bumbac
7	Sasha Letty	"Haute couture"	Jacob Jonia
8	Nadya Crajevschi	"Not a Shadow"	Ivan Aculov; Nadejda Crajevschi
9	Sasha Bognibov	"All-Night Party"	Tristan White; Andy Brook
10	Cristian Predein	"Moldovian Dance"	Alexandru Cobușcean; Cristian Predein
11	Chris Cross	"Eu vin"	Radco; Cristian Cuculescu
12	Vadim Eleni	"Mamă, să fii!"	Vladimir Eleni
13	Rina	"Dorințele"	Rodica Jabinschi; Ion Cațăr
14	Bacho and Carnival Brain	"Semafoare"	Anton Ragoza; Dumitru Golban; Edgar Bacioi; Iuri Rîbac
15	Lylu	"Be Your Light" (Note: Titled "Pop" by TRM in all mentions outside of the auditions)	Martin Hollis
16	Poops feat. Zaffi	"Destinul"	Anton Polygalov
17	Priza feat. Mc Mike	"Kookoo"	Constantin Ieșeanu; Mihail Țurcanu
18	Lisa Volk	"O lacrimă, un dor"	Marian Stârcea; Viorica Visterniceanu
19	Y-gaga Band	"Alexia"	Marian Stîrcea; Daniela Barbacari
20	Lodos	"Sentimental"	Oleg Herescu; Ilker Fatih Ayla; Veronica Rusu-Bucico
21	Sasha Bognibov	"We Changed Our Gender"	Sasha Bognibov
22	Katy Rain	"Timpul"	Ecaterina Tostogan-Condrea; Mihăiță Chiriac
23	Cătălina Solomac	"Demons"	Joacim "Jake E" Lundberg; Mihaela Marinova; Nikos Sofis; Vencislav Chanov; Vitali Ezekiev
24	Tanya Tudor	"Bring Me Back"	El-Radu Project
25	Pavel Pașcan	"Alăturea de tine"	Marian Stircea; Serghei Bilcenco; Ianoș Țurcanu
26	Zelorielle	"Miracle"	Zelorielle
—N/a	Anna G	"Meet Me in the Dark"	Anna Grosu; Virgiliu Popescu
—N/a	Dan Alexandrov	"Can't Escape"	Dumitru Alexandrov; Matthew May
—N/a	Eblansh Band	"O, Moldova mea dragă!"	Generative artificial intelligence (Note: Attributed to multiple references:) (Note: Officially credited to Dmytro Dmitriiev, Iulia Lotou, Mark Leleka-Liechtenstein and Zabava Lotou)
—N/a	Valleria	"A Picture of Myself"	Anna Vaskelainen; Valeria Condrea

== Withdrawal ==
On 22 January 2025, four days after holding the live audition round of Etapa națională, TRM announced it would withdraw from the contest, citing "economic, administrative and artistic challenges" and "a decrease in public interest and the overall quality of the songs and artistic performances" of the national final. TRM added that it would review its selection process for future editions, and that it would broadcast all three shows of the contest despite its withdrawal.
