= Run Away (SunStroke Project and Olia Tira song) =

2010 single by SunStroke Project and Olia Tira

Single by SunStroke Project and Olia Tira

from the album Run Away
- Released: 2010
- Recorded: 2009
- Genre: Dance-pop; Eurodance; Europop
- Length: 2:58
- Composers: Anton Ragoza; Sergey Stepanov
- Lyricist: Alina Galetskaya

SunStroke Project singles chronology
"Summer" (2009)	"Run Away" (2010)	"Play with Me" (2010)

Music video
- "Run Away" on YouTube

Eurovision Song Contest 2010 entry
- Country: Moldova
- Artists: Sergei Yalovitsky; Anton Ragoza; Sergey Stepanov; Olia Tira
- As: SunStroke Project and Olia Tira
- Language: English
- Composers: Anton Ragoza; Sergey Stepanov
- Lyricist: Alina Galetskaya

Finals performance
- Semi-final result: 10th
- Semi-final points: 52
- Final result: 22nd
- Final points: 27

Entry chronology
- ◄ "Hora din Moldova" (2009)
- "So Lucky" (2011) ►

Official performance video
- "Run Away" (First semi-final) on YouTube "Run Away" (Final) on YouTube

"Run Away" is a song recorded by Moldovan group SunStroke Project along with Olia Tira with music composed by Anton Ragoza and Sergey Stepanov and English lyrics written by Alina Galetskaya. It represented Moldova in the Eurovision Song Contest 2010, held in Oslo.

== Background ==
=== Conception ===
"Run Away" was composed by Anton Ragoza and Sergey Stepanov with English lyrics by Alina Galetskaya. The inspiration for the "Epic Jazz Jive" came from observing ducks, waddling through sand, on the beach.

=== Eurovision ===
On 27 February–6 March 2010, "Run Away" performed by SunStroke Project and Olia Tira competed in O melodie pentru Europa 2010, the national selection organised by Teleradio-Moldova (TRM) to select its song and performer for the 55th edition of the Eurovision Song Contest. The song won the competition so it became the Moldovan entry, and SunStroke Project and Olia Tira the performers, for Eurovision. It gained the maximum number of points from both the juries and the televotes.

On 25 May 2010, the first semi-final for the Eurovision Song Contest was held at the Telenor Arena in Oslo hosted by Norsk rikskringkasting (NRK), and broadcast live throughout the continent. SunStroke Project and Olia Tira performed "Run Away" first on the evening, placing tenth and qualifying for the final. On 29 May 2010, the Eurovision Song Contest grand final was held at the same venue and SunStroke Project and Olia Tira performed "Run Away" fourth on the evening. At the close of voting, the song had received 27 points, placing twenty-second in a field of twenty-five. The rules of the contest prohibited musical instruments being played on stage, meaning Stepanov was not actually playing the saxophone at all, but rather synchronising movements with a prerecorded track.

=== Aftermath ===
After the contest, "Run Away" would also become the subject of a major internet meme surrounding the saxophone solos performed by saxophonist Sergey Stepanov who, in a phenomenon similar to Rickrolling and Trololo, was dubbed the "Epic Sax Guy" in videos on YouTube. The internet meme of this song is often associated with Ian McKellen's portrayal of Gandalf in The Lord of the Rings: The Fellowship of the Ring; particularly a moment of joyous laughter, edited to appear if he is dancing his head to the song. Later, this song is used more as background music of video gaming (such as Hearthstone and Rainbow Six Siege) "Best moments" videos. SunStroke Project would later go on to represent Moldova in the Eurovision Song Contest 2017 for a second time with the song "Hey Mamma", placing third in the final and achieving the nation's best result to date.

== Charts ==
Chart (2010)	Peak position
Norway (VG-lista)	7
Sweden (Sverigetopplistan)	31
