= Clödie =

Polish rock band

- Origin: Częstochowa, Poland
- Genres: Rock; pop rock; hard rock
- Years active: 2012–present
- Members: Klaudia Trzepizur; Olaf Olszewski; Krzysztof Mrzygłód; Jacek Czekaj; Mateusz Królica
- Past members: Filip Warot; Paweł Remański; Rafal Wozniak; Robert Kasprzyk; Miłosz Jesionkowski; Kazimierz Chludek; Tomasz Budek
- Website: http://www.clodieofficial.pl/

Clödie are a Polish rock band formed in Częstochowa in 2012. The band currently consists of lead vocalist Klaudia Trzepizur, guitarist Olaf Olszewski, bassist Jacek Czekaj, keyboardist Krzysztof Mrzygłód, and drummer Mateusz Królica. In 2018, they went viral on YouTube for covering "Zombie" by The Cranberries, reaching over 30 million views.

== History ==
Clödie was formed by Klaudia Trzepizur in 2012. Trzepizur started by covering popular songs on her YouTube channel. Prior to starting Clödie, she was the lead vocalist in the local band Latent Effect. In 2013, Trzepizur participated on the fifth season of Polish talent show Tylko Muzyka. In 2014, Klaudia gained public attention after her participation on the fourth season of The Voice of Poland. She performed "It's a Heartache" by Bonnie Tyler, which instantly earned her the nickname "Polish Bonnie Tyler".

The band first came into attention after the release of their first English single "Go!" in 2018. The song was also submitted to Polish broadcaster Telewizja Polska in hope of representing the country at the Eurovision Song Contest 2018. In July 2018, the band released a cover version of "Zombie" by The Cranberries, which became their major breakthrough. The cover went viral on YouTube with over 25 million views. The popularity gave Clödie the opportunity to collaborate with international songwriters and producers, opening several doors to the band. Once again, the band tried to represent Poland at the Eurovision Song Contest 2019, with their newest release "Devil in Disguise", which also gained a lot of media attention and helped the band get heard outside of Poland. On 11 August, the band released the single "Zapomnijmy", which one month later was followed by its English version "Fire Burns Within". An annual tradition the band holds is releasing a Christmas single, which besides the cover of "Christmas Time" by Bryan Adams, have all been in Polish. With the release of "Świąteczny czas" in 2019, it also marked the bands first single released in their native tongue to chart.

Clödie made the release of covers a tradition and released an acoustic rendition of "Dreamer" by Ozzy Osbourne on 5 April 2020. The band released their ninth Polish single "Gniew" on 26 April. To hype upon the release of their upcoming original new single, they released a cover version of "What About Us" by Pink. On 7 October, they released a cover version of "Radioactive" by Imagine Dragons. On 31 October, the band released a cover for "Sweet Child o' Mine" by Guns N' Roses. During Polish Independence Day on 11 November, they released a cover version of the song "Arahja" by Kult. Continuing the bands tradition of releasing Christmas music, they announced the release of Brenda Lee's "Rockin' Around the Christmas Tree" accompanied with a music video.

== Musical style ==
Clödie's sound can be described as 1980's rock music with a pinch of modernity. By combining the past with the present, the band combines their love for 1980's rock music with the emotions and existence in the now.

== Band members ==
- Klaudia Trzepizur – vocals (2012–present)
- Olaf Olszewski – guitar (2015–present)
- Krzysztof Mrzygłód – keyboards (2017–present)
- Jacek Czekaj – bass guitar (2018–present)
- Mateusz Królica – drums (2018–present)

== Discography ==
=== Extended plays ===
- 2020: Memories

=== Singles ===
Year	Title	Album
2014	"Kobieta"	Non-album singles
2015	"Uwierz w siebie"	Non-album singles
2015	"Barykady"	Non-album singles
2016	"Zostawiam wszystko"	Non-album singles
2016	"7 dni"	Non-album singles
2016	"Christmas Time" (Bryan Adams cover)	Non-album singles
2016	"Meluzyna" (Małgorzata Ostrowska Cover)	Memories
2017	"Święta, ach Święta"	Non-album single
2018	"Go!"	Memories
2018	"Zombie" (The Cranberries cover)	Memories
2019	"Devil in Disguise"	Memories
2019	"Maria" (Blondie cover)	Memories
2019	"Zapomnijmy"	Memories
2019	"Fire Burns Within"	Memories
2019	"Let Me Go"	Non-album singles
2019	"Świąteczny czas"	Non-album singles
2020	"Let Me Go" (acoustic version)	Non-album singles
2020	"Dreamer" (Ozzy Osbourne cover)	Non-album singles
2020	"Gniew"	Non-album singles
2020	"What About Us" (Pink cover)	Non-album singles
2020	"Against the World"	Non-album singles
2020	"Radioactive" (Imagine Dragons cover)	Non-album singles
2020	"Sweet Child o' Mine" (Guns N' Roses cover)	Non-album singles
2020	"Arahja" (Kult cover)	Non-album singles
2020	"Rockin' Around the Christmas Tree" (Brenda Lee cover)	Non-album singles
2021	"Sins"	Non-album singles
2021	"Coraz Więcej Chcę"	Non-album singles
2021	"You Are the One"	Non-album singles
2021	"Hold On"	Non-album singles
2021	"Ironic" (Alanis Morissette cover)	Non-album singles
2021	"Santa Claus Is Back in Town" (Elvis Presley cover)	Non-album singles
2022	"Hold On" (80's live version)	Non-album singles
2022	"You Are the One" (Fresh version)	Non-album singles
2022	"Mój jest ten kawałek podłogi" (Mr. Zoob cover)	Non-album singles

=== Music videos ===
- 2014: "Kobieta"
- 2015: "Uwierz w siebie"
- 2015: "Barykady"
- 2016: "Zostawiam wszystko"
- 2016: "Meluzyna" (Małgorzata Ostrowska cover)
- 2017: "Święta, ach Święta"
- 2018: "Go!"
- 2018: "Zombie" (The Cranberries cover)
- 2019: "Devil in Disguise"
- 2019: "Zapomnijmy"
- 2019: "Let Me Go"
- 2019: "Świąteczny czas"
- 2020: "Let Me Go" (acoustic version)
- 2020: "Dreamer" (Ozzy Osbourne cover)
- 2020: "Gniew"
- 2020: "Against the World"
- 2020: "Radioactive" (Imagine Dragons cover)
- 2020: "Sweet Child o' Mine" (Guns N' Roses cover)
- 2020: "Arahja" (Kult cover)
- 2020: "Rockin' Around the Christmas Tree" (Brenda Lee cover)
- 2021: "What About Us" (Pink cover)
- 2021: "Sins"
- 2021: "You Are the One"
- 2021: "Coraz Więcej Chcę"
- 2021: "Hold On"
- 2021: "Santa Claus Is Back in Town" (Elvis Presley cover)
- 2022: "Hold On" (80's Live Version)
