= Moldova in the Eurovision Song Contest 2010 =

- Eurovision Song Contest 2010
- Participating broadcaster: TeleRadio-Moldova (TRM)
- Country: Moldova
- Selection process: O melodie pentru Europa 2010
- Selection date: 6 March 2010

Competing entry
- Song: "Run Away"
- Artist: SunStroke Project and Olia Tira
- Songwriters: Anton Ragoza; Sergey Stepanov; Alina Galetskaya

Placement
- Semi-final result: Qualified (10th, 52 points)
- Final result: 22nd, 27 points

Participation chronology

Moldova was represented at the Eurovision Song Contest 2010 with the song "Run Away", written by Anton Ragoza, Sergey Stepanov, and Alina Galetskaya, and performed by the group SunStroke Project and Olia Tira. The Moldovan participating broadcaster, TeleRadio-Moldova (TRM), organised the national final O melodie pentru Europa 2010 in order to select its entry for the contest. 83 entries competed to represent Moldova, with 30 being shortlisted to participate in the televised national final. After two semi-finals and a final which took place in February and March 2010, "Run Away" performed by SunStroke Project and Olia Tira emerged as the winner after gaining the most points following the combination of votes from a jury panel and a public televote.

Moldova was drawn to compete in the first semi-final of the Eurovision Song Contest which took place on 25 May 2010. Performing as the opening entry for the show in position 1, "Run Away" was announced among the top 10 entries of the first semi-final and therefore qualified to compete in the final on 29 May. It was later revealed that Moldova placed tenth out of the 17 participating countries in the semi-final with 52 points. In the final, Moldova performed in position 4 and placed twenty-second out of the 25 participating countries, scoring 27 points.

== Background ==
Prior to the 2010 contest, TeleRadio-Moldova (TRM) had participated in the Eurovision Song Contest representing Moldova five times since its first entry in 2005. Its best placing in the contest was sixth, achieved in 2005 with the song "Boonika bate doba" performed by Zdob și Zdub. Other than its debut entry, to this point, its only other top ten placing at the contest was achieved in 2007 with "Fight" performed by Natalia Barbu placing tenth. In 2009, "Hora din Moldova" performed by Nelly Ciobanu qualified Moldova to compete in the final and placed fourteenth.

As part of its duties as participating broadcaster, TRM organises the selection of its entry in the Eurovision Song Contest and broadcasts the event in the country. The broadcaster confirmed its intentions to participate at the 2010 contest on 18 November 2009. TRM has selected its entry via a national selection show since 2008, a procedure that was continued for their 2010 participation.

== Before Eurovision ==
=== O melodie pentru Europa 2010 ===
O melodie pentru Europa 2010 was the national final format developed by TRM in order to select its entry for the Eurovision Song Contest 2010. The event included two semi-finals and a final to be held on 27 February, 28 February and 6 March 2010, respectively. All shows in the competition were broadcast on Moldova 1 and TV Moldova Internațional as well as online via the broadcaster's official website trm.md.

==== Format ====
The selection of the competing entries for the national final and ultimately the Moldovan Eurovision entry took place over three rounds. The first round occurred on 16 January 2010 where a jury panel selected 25 semi-finalists from the received submissions based on criteria such as the quality of the melody and composition, vocals and lyrics of the song and style of the performance. The second round was a public wildcard vote held between 29 January and 14 February 2010, which selected an additional 5 semi-finalists out of 50 entries not selected from the first round to proceed to the third round, the televised national final. 15 semi-finalists competed in each semi-final on 27 and 28 February 2010. Seven songs qualified to the final from each semi-final based on the combined votes from an expert jury and public televoting results. The fourteen qualifying entries competed in the final on 6 March 2010 where the winner was selected by the 50/50 combination of an expert jury vote and a public televote. In the event of a tie, the entry that receives the highest score from the expert jury vote was declared the winner.

==== Competing entries ====
Artists and composers had the opportunity to submit their entries between 15 December 2009 and 8 January 2010. Artists were required to be of Moldovan nationality and could submit more than one song, while an international act was able to compete only if they were part of a duo or group with at least a member who was of Moldovan nationality. Songwriters could hold any nationality. Artists were also able to apply without a song, and in such cases they were able to select one of the songs submitted by international songwriters. At the conclusion of the submission deadline, 83 valid entries were received by the broadcaster. A jury consisting of Ion Suruceanu (singer), Lidia Panfil (lecturer at the Academy of Music, Theatre and Fine Arts), Nelly Ciobanu (singer, 2009 Moldovan Eurovision entrant), Vitalia Rotaru (producer, composer), Sergiu Gavriliţă (VIP Magazin editor-in-chief), Vlad Costandoi (producer), Liviu Știrbu (composer), Anatol Chiriac (composer), Marcel Ștefăneț (conductor and instrumentalist) and Anatol Caciuc (programme director of Radio Moldova) selected 25 semi-finalists out of the 83 received entries, while an additional five semi-finalists were selected from 50 of the remaining entries by a public televote that ran between 29 January and 14 February 2010. On 15 February 2010, the 30 semi-finalists were allocated to one of the two semi-finals, each containing 15 entries.

On 25 January 2010, "Lady Gaga" performed by Akord was withdrawn from the competition. On 23 February 2010, "Towards the Sky" performed by Alex White, "Wait!" performed by Ionel Istrati, "Goodbye" performed by Olia Tira, "Believe" performed by SunStroke Project and "Padure, verde padure" performed by Victoria Mahu were withdrawn and replaced with the songs "The Robbery" performed by Constantinova and Fusu, "Day and Night" performed by Dana Marchitan, "So Many Questions" performed by JJ Jazz, "Poza ta" performed by Veronica Lupu and "Ţi-aduci aminte" performed by Vitalie Toderascu.

Artist	Song	Songwriter(s)	Selection
Alexandru Manciu	"Rămîi lîngă mine"	Alexandru Manciu	Jury
Boris Covali	"No Name"	Zaza Hubuscalasvili, Anastasia Larionova	Jury
Brand	"S.O.S."	Andrey Rajecki	Public vote
Carolina Gorun	"Addicted"	Anna Gulko, Mircea Gutu	Jury
Constantinova and Fusu	"The Robbery"	Leonard Fusu, Anna Constantinova	Jury
Corina Cuniuc and Denis Latâşev	"Forever"	Elena Buga, Ilie G. Jr.	Jury
Cristina Croitoru	"My Heart"	Valentin Dînga, Elena Buga	Jury
Cristy Rouge	"Don't Break My Heart"	Cristy Rouge, Sandu Gorgos	Jury
Dana Marchitan	"Day and Night"	Andrej Hadjiu, Veaceslav Daniliuc	Jury
Doinița Gherman	"Meloterapia"	Eugeniu Condiu, Populara	Public vote
Dyma	"Manipulate"	Alexandru Brașoveanu, Aris Kalimeris	Jury
Eugen Doibani	"Love Sweet Love"	Eugen Doibani	Jury
Gicu Cimbir	"Cine sunt eu"	Gicu Cimbir	Jury
Gloria	"I'm Not Alone"	Gloria Gorceag, Alexandru Brașoveanu	Jury
Irina Tarasiuc	"Lucky Star"	Mirela Bazelyuk, Mariana Styrchi	Jury
JJ Jazz	"So Many Questions"	Pavel Barabanshchikov, Inga Milosavljevic	Jury
MBeyline	"Never Step Back"	Mariana Berdianu	Public vote
Marcel Roșca	"If Love Is the Thing"	Patrycja Kawecka, Pawel Jurczak	Jury
Mariana Mihăilă	"Say I'm Sorry"	Marc Paelinck, Michael Garvin	Jury
Mihai Teodor	"Ai-Ai-Ai"	Mihai Teodor	Jury
Millennium	"Before You Go"	Olga Gorcinschi, Vica Demici	Jury
Monkey Mind and Daniela	"Smile"	Mitelea Daniela, Igor Mura	Jury
Nicoleta Gavrilita	"De tristețe"	Marian Stîrcea, Radmila Popovici-Paraschiv	Jury
Pasha	"You Should Like"	Pavel Parfeni	Jury
Pavel Turcu	"Imn Eurovision"	Pavel Turcu	Public vote
SunStroke Project and Olia Tira	"Run Away"	Anton Ragoza, Sergey Stepanov, Alina Galetskaya	Jury
Todo	"Dance 4 Life"	Radu Lepadatu	Public vote
Valeria Tarasova	"See You Soon"	Mia, Marian Stîrcea	Jury
Veronica Lupu	"Poza ta"	Viorel Burlacu	Jury
Vitalie Toderascu	"Ţi-aduci aminte"	Vitalie Toderascu	Jury

==== Semi-finals ====
The two semi-finals took place on 27 and 28 February 2010 at TRM Studio 2 in Chișinău, hosted by Dianna Rotaru and Iurie Gologan with Lucian Dumitrescu reporting from the green room. In each semi-final fifteen songs competed and the top seven songs qualified to the final based on the combination of votes from a public televote and the votes of an expert jury.

In addition to the performances of the competing entries, 2009 Moldovan Eurovision entrant Nelly Ciobanu, rock band Cezara and the ballet company Teodor performed as guests in the first semi-final, while 2006 Moldovan Eurovision entrants Arsenium and Natalia Gordienko, 2008 Moldovan Eurovision entrant Arsenium, singers Serj Kuzencoff and Elena Demirdjean, and the ballet company Teodor performed as guests in the second semi-final.

Semi-final 1 – 27 February 2010
R/O	Artist	Song	Points	Place
1	Mihai Teodor	"Ai-Ai-Ai"	0	13
2	Corina Cuniuc and Denis Latâşev	"Forever"	2	11
3	Doinița Gherman	"Meloterapia"	8	7
4	SunStroke Project and Olia Tira	"Run Away"	22	1
5	Millennium	"Before You Go"	20	2
6	Marcel Roșca	"If Love Is the Thing"	5	10
7	Nicoleta Gavrilita	"De tristețe"	7	8
8	Dyma	"Manipulate"	12	3
9	JJ Jazz	"So Many Questions"	0	13
10	Todo	"Dance 4 Life"	1	12
11	Eugen Doibani	"Love Sweet Love"	10	6
12	Monkey Mind and Daniela	"Smile"	11	4
13	Dana Marchitan	"Day and Night"	7	8
14	Constantinova and Fusu	"The Robbery"	0	13
15	Carolina Gorun	"Addicted"	11	4

Semi-final 2 – 28 February 2010
R/O	Artist	Song	Points	Place
1	Boris Covali	"No Name"	11	5
2	Pavel Turcu	"Imn Eurovision"	10	6
3	Gloria	"I'm Not Alone"	7	9
4	Pasha	"You Should Like"	17	2
5	Alexandru Manciu	"Rămîi lîngă mine"	13	3
6	Mariana Mihăilă	"Say I'm Sorry"	9	8
7	Vitalie Toderascu	"Ţi-aduci aminte"	0	12
8	Gicu Cimbir	"Cine sunt eu"	9	7
9	Irina Tarasiuc	"Lucky Star"	0	12
10	Cristy Rouge	"Don't Break My Heart"	2	10
11	Veronica Lupu	"Poza ta"	0	12
12	Valeria Tarasova	"See You Soon"	12	4
13	MBeyline	"Never Step Back"	0	12
14	Brand	"S.O.S."	2	10
15	Cristina Croitor	"My Heart"	24	1

==== Final ====
The final took place on 6 March 2010 at TRM Studio 2 in Chișinău, hosted by Dianna Rotaru and Iurie Gologan with Lucian Dumitrescu reporting from the green room. The fourteen songs that qualified from the preceding two semi-finals competed and the winner was selected based on the combination of a public televote and the votes of an expert jury. The jury that voted in the final included Jerome Poulain (marketing, communication and sales director of Orange Moldova), Angela Sârbu (director of Moldova 1), Ana Diubeli (programme director of Radio Moldova), Marcel Ștefăneț (conductor and instrumentalist), Svetlana Bivol (director of the National Philharmonic Concert Hall), Liviu Știrbu (composer) and Vlad Costandoi (producer). In addition to the performances of the competing entries, singer InGrid and the ballet company Teodor performed as guests. "Run Away" performed by SunStroke Project and Olia Tira was selected as the winner.

Final – 6 March 2010
R/O	Artist	Song	Jury		Televote		Total	Place
R/O	Artist	Song	Votes	Points	Percentage	Points	Total	Place
1	Doinița Gherman	"Meloterapia"	27	0	6.23%	5	5	10
2	Valeria Tarasova	"See You Soon"	46	5	3.43%	1	6	9
3	SunStroke Project and Olia Tira	"Run Away"	78	12	17.85%	12	24	1
4	Pasha	"You Should Like"	71	10	10.57%	7	17	3
5	Dyma	"Manipulate"	31	2	5.82%	4	6	7
6	Pavel Turcu	"Imn Eurovision"	1	0	9.30%	6	6	6
7	Eugen Doibani	"Love Sweet Love"	29	1	4.34%	3	4	11
8	Boris Covali	"No Name"	60	8	3.31%	0	8	5
9	Carolina Gorun	"Addicted"	8	0	1.82%	0	0	13
10	Gicu Cimbir	"Cine sunt eu"	38	3	1.94%	0	3	12
11	Millennium	"Before You Go"	55	7	17.39%	10	17	2
12	Cristina Croitoru	"My Heart"	53	6	10.91%	8	14	4
13	Monkey Mind and Daniela	"Smile"	5	0	3.06%	0	0	13
14	Alexandru Manciu	"Rămîi lîngă mine"	44	4	4.03%	2	6	8

Detailed Jury Votes
R/O	Song	J. Poulain	A. Sârbu	A. Diubeli	M. Ștefăneț	S. Bivol	L. Știrbu	V. Costandoi	Total
1	"Meloterapia"	6	2	2	5	4	7	1	27
2	"See You Soon"	5	10		4	12	12	3	46
3	"Run Away"	11	12	11	10	11	11	12	78
4	"You Should Like"	12	9	12	11	7	10	10	71
5	"Manipulate"	9	4	6	3	3	2	4	31
6	"Imn Eurovision"			1					1
7	"Love Sweet Love"	3	5	5	2	2	4	8	29
8	"No Name"	10	8	8	9	6	8	11	60
9	"Addicted"	2	1		1	1	1	2	8
10	"Cine sunt eu"	7	3	3	8	5	5	7	38
11	"Before You Go"	8	11	9	7	9	6	5	55
12	"My Heart"		6	10	12	10	9	6	53
13	"Smile"	1			4				5
14	"Rămîi lîngă mine"	4	7	7	6	8	3	9	44

==== Ratings ====
Viewing figures by show
Show	Air date	Viewers	Ref.
Final	6 March 2010	450,000	

=== Promotion ===
SunStroke Project and Olia Tira made several appearances across Europe to specifically promote "Run Away" as the Moldovan Eurovision entry. On 4 April, SunStroke Project and Olia Tira performed during an event held at the Place Sainte-Catherine/Sint-Katelijneplein in Brussels, Belgium. The performers also took part in promotional activities in Azerbaijan, Cyprus, Romania, Russia and Ukraine which included television, radio and concert appearances.

== At Eurovision ==
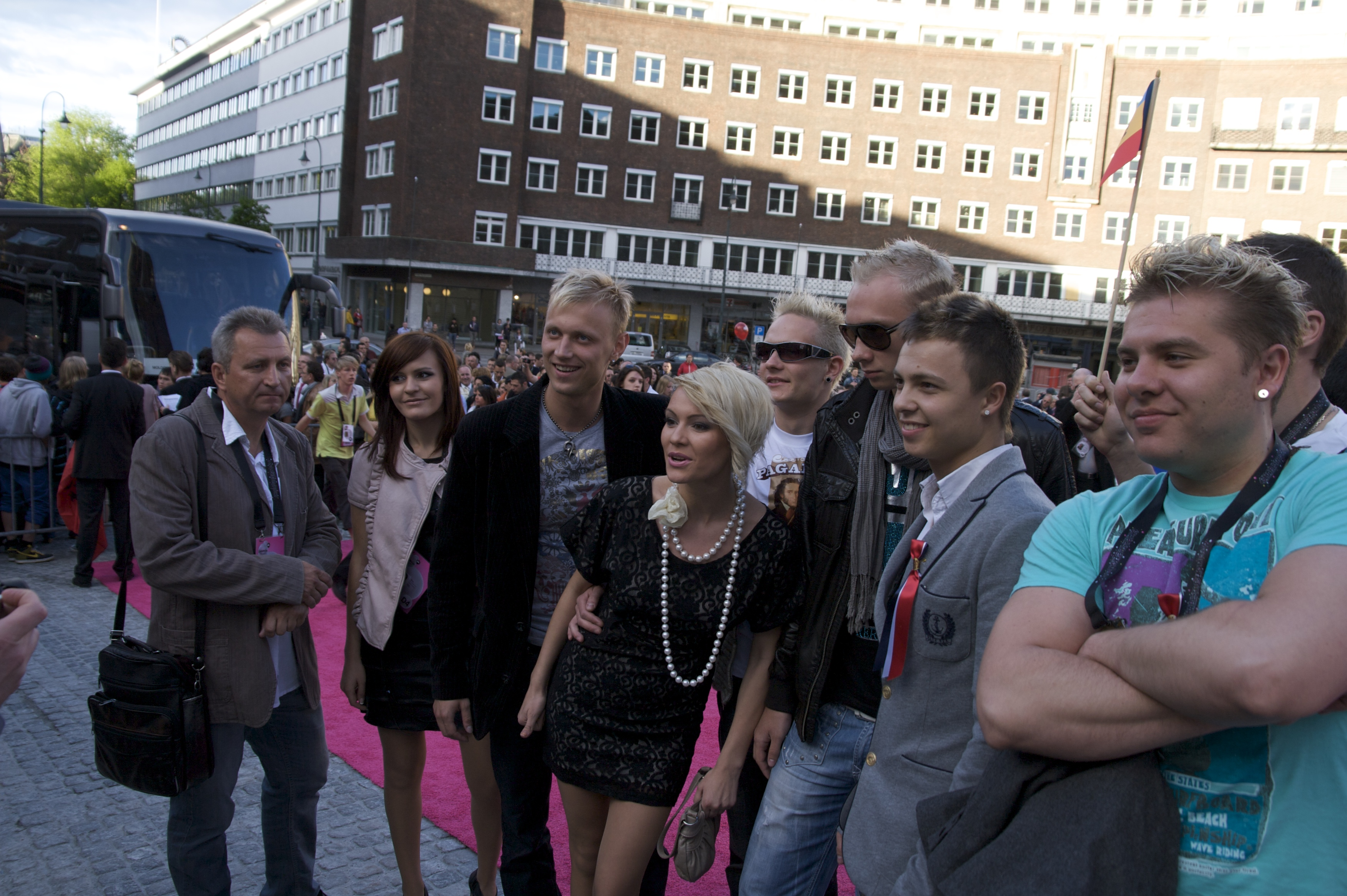
SunStroke Project and Olia Tira at the Eurovision Opening Party in Oslo

According to Eurovision rules, all nations with the exceptions of the host country and the "Big Four" (France, Germany, Spain and the United Kingdom) are required to qualify from one of two semi-finals in order to compete for the final; the top ten countries from each semi-final progress to the final. The European Broadcasting Union (EBU) split up the competing countries into six different pots based on voting patterns from previous contests, with countries with favourable voting histories put into the same pot. On 7 February 2010, a special allocation draw was held which placed each country into one of the two semi-finals, as well as which half of the show they would perform in. Estonia was placed into the first semi-final, to be held on 25 May 2010, and was scheduled to perform in the first half of the show. The running order for the semi-finals was decided through another draw on 23 March 2010 and Estonia was set to open the show and perform in position 1, before the entry from Russia.

The two semi-finals and the final were televised in Moldova on Moldova 1 and TV Moldova Internațional. All broadcasts featured commentary by Marcel Spătari. The Moldovan spokesperson, who announced the Moldovan votes during the final, was Tania Cergă.

=== Semi-final ===
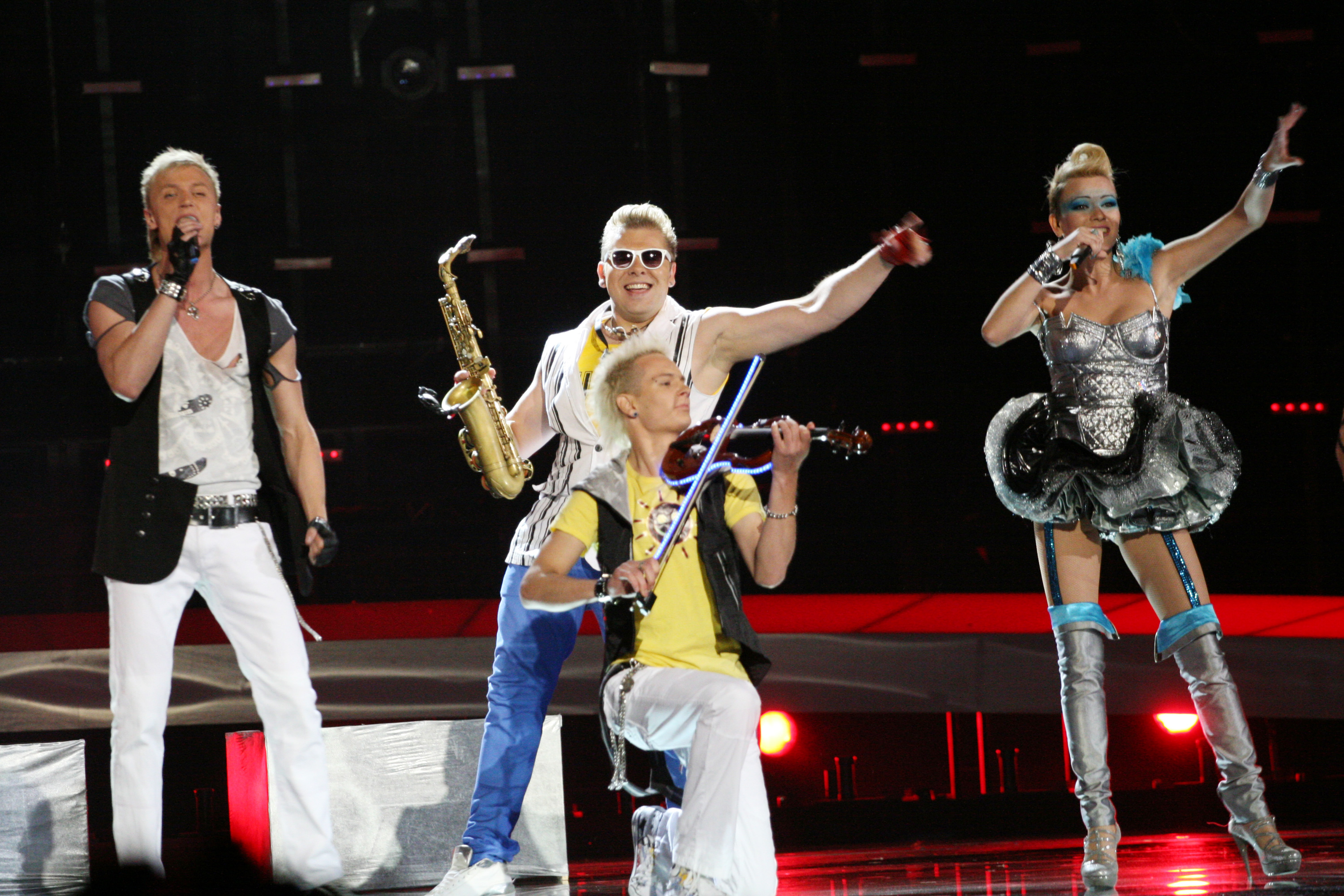
SunStroke Project and Olia Tira during a rehearsal before the first semi-final

SunStroke Project and Olia Tira took part in technical rehearsals on 16 and 20 May, followed by dress rehearsals on 24 and 25 May. This included the jury show on 9 May where the professional juries of each country watched and voted on the competing entries.

The Moldovan performance featured the members of SunStroke Project dressed in black and white trousers and shirts with their instruments being LED-enhanced, and Olia Tira dressed in a silver dress and silver boots with light blue straps. The performers were also joined on stage by two dancers. The performance began with a pyrotechnic effect, while Anton Ragoza and Sergei Yalovitsky, the latter who stood beside Tira with both of them on white boxes, stood on rotating discs located on the main stage and stage catwalk, respectively. The stage featured green and purple lighting and flickering blue and white lights throughout.

At the end of the show, Moldova was announced as having finished in the top ten and subsequently qualifying for the grand final. It was later revealed that Moldova placed tenth in the semi-final, receiving a total of 52 points.

=== Final ===
Shortly after the first semi-final, a winners' press conference was held for the ten qualifying countries. As part of this press conference, the qualifying artists took part in a draw to determine the running order for the final. This draw was done in the order the countries were announced during the semi-final. Moldova was drawn to perform in position 4, following the entry from Norway and before the entry from Cyprus.

SunStroke Project and Olia Tira once again took part in dress rehearsals on 28 and 29 May before the final, including the jury final where the professional juries cast their final votes before the live show. The artists performed a repeat of their semi-final performance during the final on 29 May. Moldova placed twenty-second in the final, scoring 27 points.

=== Voting ===
Voting during the three shows consisted of 50 percent public televoting and 50 percent from a jury deliberation. The jury consisted of five music industry professionals who were citizens of the country they represent. This jury was asked to judge each contestant based on: vocal capacity; the stage performance; the song's composition and originality; and the overall impression by the act. In addition, no member of a national jury could be related in any way to any of the competing acts in such a way that they cannot vote impartially and independently.

Following the release of the full split voting by the EBU after the conclusion of the competition, it was revealed that Moldova had placed eighteenth with the public televote and twenty-third with the jury vote in the final. In the public vote, Moldova scored 28 points, while with the jury vote, Moldova scored 33 points. In the first semi-final, Moldova placed tenth with the public televote with 54 points and thirteenth with the jury vote, scoring 42 points.

Below is a breakdown of points awarded to Moldova and awarded by Moldova in the second semi-final and grand final of the contest. The nation awarded its 12 points to Russia in the semi-final and to Romania in the final of the contest.

==== Points awarded to Moldova ====
Points awarded to Moldova (Semi-final 1)
Score	Country
12 points	
10 points	Belarus
8 points	Portugal
7 points	Macedonia; Malta
6 points	
5 points	Russia; Spain
4 points	Greece
3 points	France
2 points	Belgium
1 point	Serbia

Points awarded to Moldova (Final)
Score	Country
12 points	
10 points	Romania
8 points	
7 points	
6 points	Azerbaijan; Portugal
5 points	
4 points	Belarus
3 points	
2 points	
1 point	Georgia

==== Points awarded by Moldova ====
Points awarded by Moldova (Semi-final 1)
Score	Country
12 points	Russia
10 points	Iceland
8 points	Belarus
7 points	Greece
6 points	Belgium
5 points	Portugal
4 points	Macedonia
3 points	Serbia
2 points	Poland
1 point	Bosnia and Herzegovina

Points awarded by Moldova (Final)
Score	Country
12 points	Romania
10 points	Russia
8 points	Ukraine
7 points	Azerbaijan
6 points	Armenia
5 points	Georgia
4 points	Spain
3 points	Belarus
2 points	Greece
1 point	Israel

== After Eurovision ==
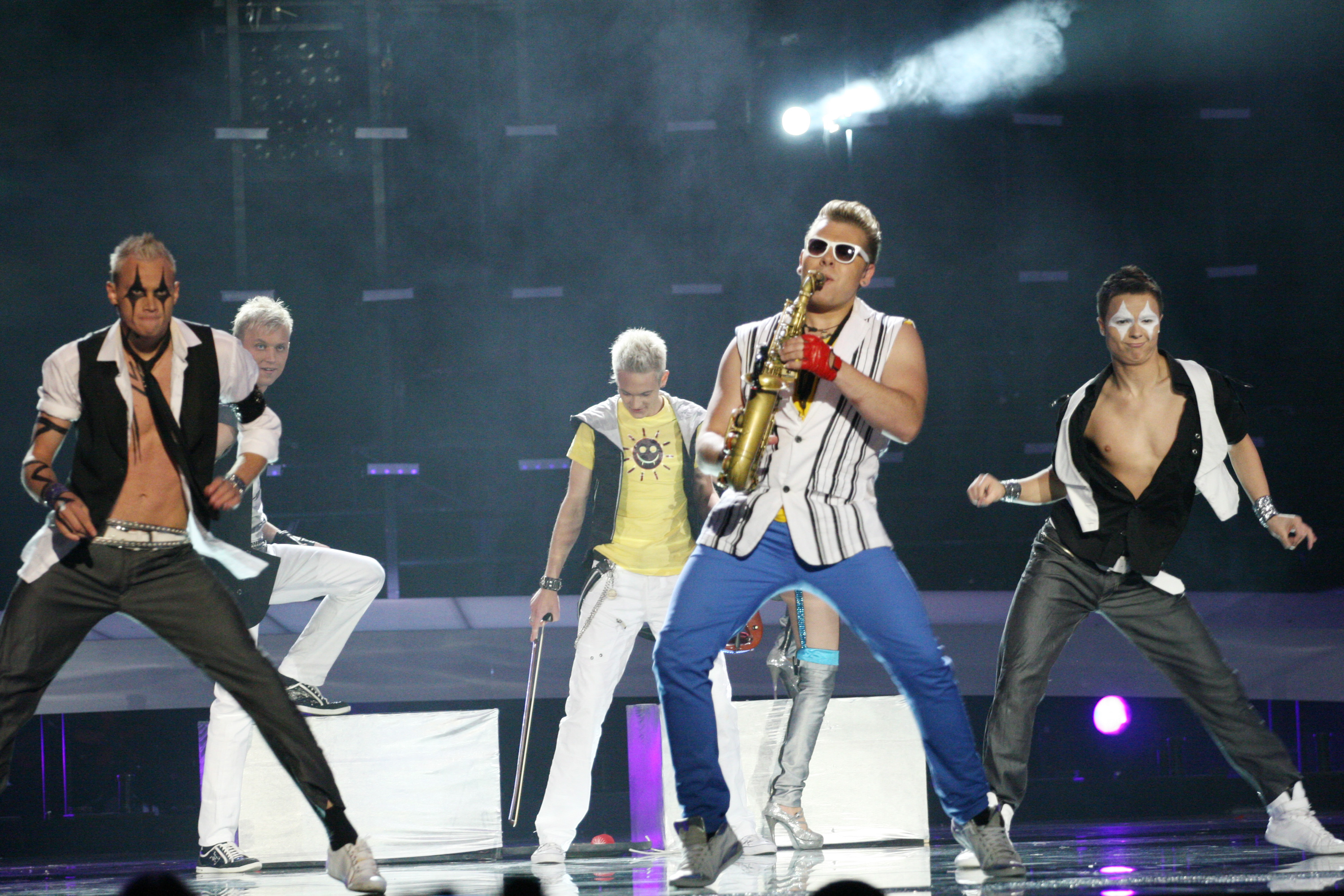
Sergey Stepanov gained popularity as the Internet meme "Epic Sax Guy" after the 2010 contest

After the Eurovision performance there was much discussion about the saxophonist of SunStroke Project, Sergey Stepanov, who came to be known as an Internet meme called "Epic Sax Guy". This has led to online tribute videos being made by users, featuring looped clips of Stepanov's saxophone solo with one of them being ten hours long, which have gone viral with millions of views. SunStroke Project would later go on to represent Moldova in the Eurovision Song Contest 2017 for a second time with the song "Hey Mamma", placing third in the final and achieving the nation's best result to date.
