= Małgorzata Ostrowska =

Polish politician (1958–2024)

Member of Sejm
- In office 14 October 1993 – 4 November 2007

Personal details
- Born: 31 July 1958
- Died: 8 August 2024 (aged 66)
- Party: Democratic Left Alliance

Małgorzata Teresa Ostrowska (née Kuźniewska (31 July 1958 – 8 August 2024) was a Polish politician who served as a member of the Sejm of Poland from 19 September 1993 to 4 November 2007.

A native of the northern town of Malbork, the seat of Malbork County in the Pomeranian Voivodeship, Małgorzata Ostrowska belonged to the Democratic Left Alliance and initially gained her Senate seat in the 1993 parliamentary election. She was a member of Sejm 1993–1997, Sejm 1997–2001, and Sejm 2001–2005. In the election held on 25 September 2005, she ran in the Gdańsk electoral district, receiving 12,861 votes, but two years later, enmeshed in a corruption investigation, she lost her parliamentary immunity and then her seat in the 2007 parliamentary election. She died on 8 August 2024, at the age of 66.

== See also ==
- Members of Polish Sejm 2005–2007
