= Moldova in the Eurovision Song Contest 2017 =

- Eurovision Song Contest 2017
- Participating broadcaster: TeleRadio-Moldova (TRM)
- Country: Moldova
- Selection process: O melodie pentru Europa 2017
- Selection date: 25 February 2017

Competing entry
- Song: "Hey Mamma"
- Artist: SunStroke Project
- Songwriters: Anton Ragoza; Sergei Ialovitski; Sergey Stepanov; Mihail Cebotarenco; Alina Galetskaya

Placement
- Semi-final result: Qualified (2nd, 291 points)
- Final result: 3rd, 374 points

Participation chronology

Moldova was represented at the Eurovision Song Contest 2017 with the song "Hey Mamma" written by Anton Ragoza, Sergei Ialovitski, Sergey Stepanov, Mihail Cebotarenco and Alina Galetskaya. The song was performed by the group SunStroke Project. The Moldovan broadcaster TeleRadio-Moldova (TRM) organised the national final O melodie pentru Europa 2017 in order to select the Moldovan entry for the 2016 contest in Kyiv, Ukraine. 40 entries competed to represent Moldova in Kyiv, with 14 being shortlisted to participate in the televised national final after auditioning in front of a jury panel. After a semi-final and final which took place on 24 and 25 February 2017, "Hey Mamma" performed by SunStroke Project emerged as the winner after gaining the most points following the combination of votes from a jury panel and a public televote.

Moldova was drawn to compete in the first semi-final of the Eurovision Song Contest which took place on 9 May 2017. Performing during the show in position 12, "Hey Mamma" was announced among the top 10 entries of the first semi-final and therefore qualified to compete in the final on 13 May. It was later revealed that Moldova placed second out of the 18 participating countries in the semi-final with 291 points. In the final, Moldova performed in position 7 and placed third out of the 26 participating countries, scoring 374 points. This marked Moldova's best placing in the history of the contest.

== Background ==
Prior to the 2017 contest, Moldova had participated in the Eurovision Song Contest twelve times since its first entry in 2005. The nation's best placing in the contest was sixth, which it achieved in 2005 with the song "Boonika bate doba" performed by Zdob și Zdub. Other than their debut entry, to this point, Moldova's only other top ten placing at the contest was achieved in 2007 where "Fight" performed by Natalia Barbu placed tenth. In the 2016 contest, "Falling Stars" performed by Lidia Isac failed to qualify Moldova to compete in the final.

The Moldovan national broadcaster, TeleRadio-Moldova (TRM), broadcast the event within Moldova and organised the selection process for the nation's entry. TRM confirmed their intentions to participate at the 2017 Eurovision Song Contest on 25 October 2016. Moldova has selected their entry via a national selection show since 2008, a procedure that was continued for their 2017 participation.

== Before Eurovision ==
=== O melodie pentru Europa 2017 ===
O melodie pentru Europa 2017 was the national final format developed by TRM in order to select Moldova's entry for the Eurovision Song Contest 2017. The event included a semi-final and a final to be held on 24 and 25 February 2017, respectively. All shows in the competition were broadcast on Moldova 1, Radio Moldova Actualități, Radio Moldova Tineret and Radio Moldova Muzical as well as online via the broadcaster's official website trm.md.

==== Format ====
The selection of the competing entries for the national final and ultimately the Moldovan Eurovision entry took place over two rounds. The first round was a live audition of the received submissions in front of a jury panel that took place on 21 January 2017. Entries were assessed on criteria such as voice quality, stage presence and strength of the composition. The panel selected 14 semi-finalists to proceed to the second round, the televised national final. The 14 semi-finalists competed in the semi-final on 24 February 2017. Eight songs qualified to the final; four of the qualifiers qualified based on the votes from an expert jury, while an additional four qualifiers were selected from the remaining entries by public televoting. The eight qualifying entries competed in the final on 25 February 2017 where the winner was selected by the 50/50 combination of an expert jury vote and a public televote. In the event of a tie, the entry that receives the highest score from the public televote was declared the winner.

==== Competing entries ====
Artists and composers had the opportunity to submit their entries between 12 December 2016 and 18 January 2017. An international act was able to compete only if they were part of a duo or group where 50% of the lead vocalists were of Moldovan nationality. Artists could submit more than one song, however, if they were chosen as a semi-finalist with more than one song, the artist would have to choose one entry to continue with in the competition. At the conclusion of the submission deadline, 40 valid entries were received by the broadcaster. The live audition round took place on 21 January 2017 at TRM studios in Chișinău where 14 semi-finalists were selected to advance. The auditions were broadcast on Moldova 2 as well as online via trm.md. "Not Over You" performed by Maxim Zavidia was withdrawn from the competition and therefore did not attend the auditions. Shakya also did not attend the auditions and therefore his song "Beautiful Life" was disqualified. Among the semi-finalists was 2010 Moldovan Eurovision entrant SunStroke Project.

On 23 January 2017, "Mama" performed by Constantin Cobîlean was withdrawn from the competition and replaced with the song "Never Give Up on Us" performed by Nadia Moșneagu due to the Russian language version of the former song having been publicly performed in 2015. On 14 February, "Călător" performed by Boris Covali was withdrawn and replaced by Liuba Doga and her song "One Thought Away", which was also withdrawn and ultimately replaced with the song "Ne-a fost iubirea un joc" performed by Sergiu Pungă. On 24 January, "Baby, Don't Cry" performed by Irina Kit was withdrawn following the revelation that its chorus had similarities to the song "Bananza" by Akon; she was replaced by Samir Loghin and his song "Glow".

Artist	Song	Songwriter(s)
Aurel Chirtoacă	"Dor de mamă"	Aurel Chirtoacă
Big Flash Sound	"Logic"	Big Flash Sound - Eugenia Golomidova, Eugen Valeev
~~Boris Covali~~	~~"Călător"~~	~~Șerban Cazan, Theea Miculescu~~
~~Constantin Cobîlean~~	~~"Mama"~~	~~Artur Petrosyan, Iurie Carp~~
Diana Brescan	"Breath"	Andrei Tostogan, Liuba Perciun
Emilia Russu	"If Only You"	Samuel Bugia Garrido, Athanasios Nakos
Ethno Republic and Surorile Osoianu	"Discover Moldova"	Marcel Ștefăneț, Nelu Laiu
~~Irina Kit~~	~~"Baby, Don't Cry"~~	~~Irina Kitoroagă, Hans Olof Furberg, DJ Kirumba~~
~~Liuba Doga~~	~~"One Thought Away"~~	~~Liuba Doga~~
Marks and Ștefăneț	"Join Us in the Rain"	Ralph Siegel, Steven Barnacle, A. Sprinfeld
Nadia Moșneagu	"Never Give Up on Us"	Johan Lundin, Vanessa Nordmark
Samir Loghin	"Glow"	Samir Loghin, Danil Murzac, Kälin Bogdan
Sandy C	"A Beautiful World"	Christian Alares, Malin Johansson, Christopher Wortley
Sergiu Pungă	"Ne-a fost iubirea un joc"	Sergiu Pungă
SunStroke Project	"Hey Mamma"	SunStroke Project, Alina Galetskaya
The One	"Dance"	Iurie Sceankin, Igor Cristov, Pavel Malișev
Valeria Pașa	"Freedom"	Eugen Doibani
Vozniuc feat. Vio Grecu	"Don't Lie"	Dan Vozniuc, Rodica Olișevschi

==== Shows ====
===== Semi-final =====
The semi-final took place on 24 February 2017 at the TRM Studio 2 in Chișinău, hosted by Liviu Gulica and Mihaela Cîrnov with Felicia Dunaf reporting from the green room. Eight songs qualified to the final. The first four qualifiers were selected based on the votes of an expert jury, while the remaining four qualifiers were selected by a public televote between the remaining non-qualifiers. The jury that voted in the semi-final included Anatol Chiriac (composer), Ilona Stepan (conductor), Iurie Mahovici (composer), Lidia Panfil (director), Valeria Barbas (singer and composer), Nicu Țărnă (singer) and Geta Burlacu (singer, 2008 Moldovan Eurovision entrant). In addition to the performances of the competing entries, 2014 Moldovan Eurovision entrant Cristina Scarlat, singer Stela Boţan and the groups DoReDoS and Cezara performed as guests.

Jury qualifier Public vote qualifier

Semi-final (First round) – 24 February 2017
R/O	Artist	Song	Points	Place
1	Vozniuc feat. Vio Grecu	"Don't Lie"	26	6
2	Emilia Russu	“If Only You”	21	9
3	Sandy C	"A Beautiful World"	25	7
4	Valeria Pașa	"Freedom"	36	5
5	Sergiu Pungă	"Ne-a fost iubirea un joc"	12	12
6	Ethno Republic and Surorile Osoianu	"Discover Moldova"	65	2
7	Marks and Ștefăneț	"Join Us in the Rain"	13	11
8	Aurel Chirtoacă	"Dor de mamă"	38	4
9	Big Flash Sound	"Logic"	17	10
10	SunStroke Project	"Hey Mamma"	67	1
11	Diana Brescan	"Breathe"	52	3
12	Nadia Moșneagu	"Never Give Up On Us"	3	14
13	Samir Loghin	"Glow"	8	13
14	The One	"Dance"	23	8

Detailed jury votes
R/O	Song	A. Chiriac	I. Stepan	I. Mahovici	L. Panfil	V. Barbas	N. Țărnă	G. Burlacu	Total
1	"Don't Lie"		4			12	8	2	26
2	“If Only You”	7	1	6		6	1		21
3	"A Beautiful World"	4			6	4	5	6	25
4	"Freedom"	8	5	5	3	5		10	36
5	"Ne-a fost iubirea un joc"	2					10		12
6	"Discover Moldova"	6	10	10	12	8	12	7	65
7	"Join Us in the Rain"	3	3			1	6		13
8	"Dor de mamă"	5	7	4	7		7	8	38
9	"Logic"	1	2	3	4	2		5	17
10	"Hey Mamma"	10	12	12	10	7	4	12	67
11	"Breathe"	12	8	7	8	10	3	4	52
12	"Never Give Up On Us"			1	2				3
13	"Glow"			2	5			1	8
14	"Dance"		6	8	1	3	2	3	23

Semi-final (Second round) – 24 February 2017
Artist	Song	Televote	Place
Big Flash Sound	"Logic"	34	9
Emilia Russu	“If Only You”	81	8
Marks and Ștefăneț	"Join Us in the Rain"	440	1
Nadia Moșneagu	"Never Give Up On Us"	16	10
Samir Loghin	"Glow"	335	2
Sandy C	"A Beautiful World"	108	5
Sergiu Pungă	"Ne-a fost iubirea un joc"	99	6
The One	"Dance"	86	7
Valeria Pașa	"Freedom"	120	3
Vozniuc feat. Vio Grecu	"Don't Lie"	113	4

===== Final =====
The final took place on 25 February 2017 at the TRM Studio 2 in Chișinău, hosted by Liviu Gulica and Mihaela Cîrnov with Galina Timus reporting from the green room. The eight songs that qualified from the preceding semi-final competed and the winner was selected based on the combination of a public televote and the votes of an expert jury. In addition to the performances of the competing entries, 2016 Moldovan Eurovision entrant Lidia Isac performed as a guest. "Hey Mamma" performed by SunStroke Project and "Discover Moldova" performed by Ethno Republic and Surorile Osoianu were tied for the first place with 22 points each but since SunStroke Project received the most votes from the public they were declared the winner.

Final – 25 February 2017
R/O	Artist	Song	Jury		Televote		Total	Place
R/O	Artist	Song	Votes	Points	Votes	Points	Total	Place
1	SunStroke Project	"Hey Mamma"	88	10	1,539	12	22	1
2	Samir Loghin	"Glow"	34	3	217	7	10	7
3	Valeria Pașa	"Freedom"	51	5	148	6	11	6
4	Aurel Chirtoacă	"Dor de mamă"	56	6	63	3	9	8
5	Diana Brescan	"Breathe"	80	8	127	5	13	3
6	Marks and Ștefăneț	"Join Us in the Rain"	38	4	471	8	12	4
7	Ethno Republic and Surorile Osoianu	"Discover Moldova"	90	12	598	10	22	2
8	Vozniuc feat. Vio Grecu	"Don't Lie"	58	7	109	4	11	5

=== Promotion ===
SunStroke Project made several appearances across Europe to specifically promote "Hey Mamma" as the Moldovan Eurovision entry. SunStroke Project performed the Moldovan entry as guests during the final of the Romanian Eurovision national final on 5 March, the Greek Eurovision national final on 6 March, and the final of the Lithuanian Eurovision national final on 11 March. Between 3 and 6 April, SunStroke Project took part in promotional activities in Tel Aviv, Israel and performed during the Israel Calling event held at the Ha'teatron venue. On 14 April, SunStroke Project performed during the Eurovision in Concert event which was held at the Melkweg venue in Amsterdam, Netherlands and hosted by Cornald Maas and Selma Björnsdóttir. On 15 April, SunStroke Project performed during the Eurovision Spain Pre-Party, which was held at the Sala La Riviera venue in Madrid, Spain.

== At Eurovision ==
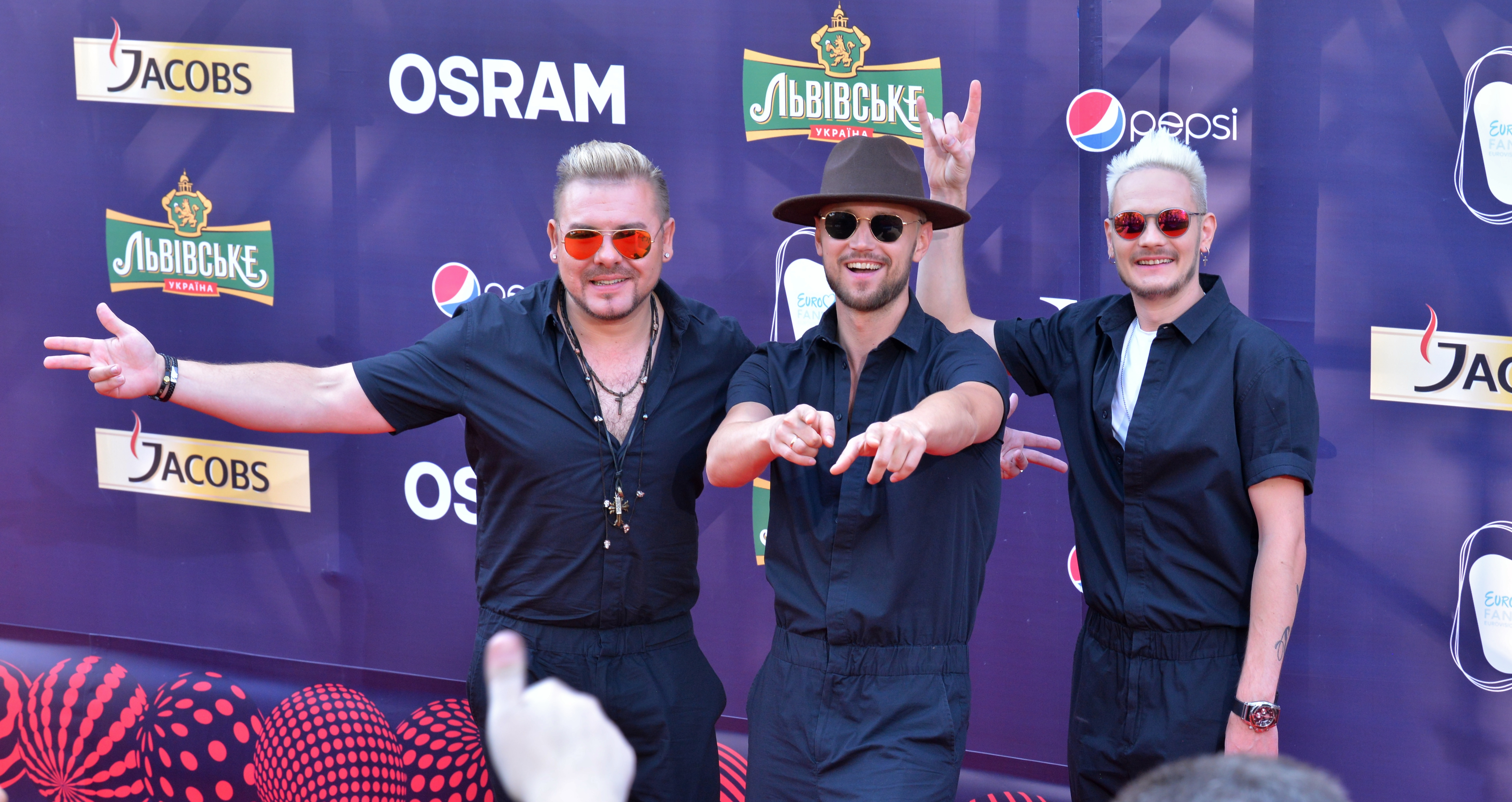
SunStroke Project at the 2017 Eurovision Red Carpet event

According to Eurovision rules, all nations with the exceptions of the host country and the "Big Five" (France, Germany, Italy, Spain and the United Kingdom) are required to qualify from one of two semi-finals in order to compete for the final; the top ten countries from each semi-final progress to the final. The European Broadcasting Union (EBU) split up the competing countries into six different pots based on voting patterns from previous contests, with countries with favourable voting histories put into the same pot. On 31 January 2017, a special allocation draw was held which placed each country into one of the two semi-finals, as well as which half of the show they would perform in. Moldova was placed into the first semi-final, to be held on 9 May 2017, and was scheduled to perform in the second half of the show.

Once all the competing songs for the 2017 contest had been released, the running order for the semi-finals was decided by the shows' producers rather than through another draw, so that similar songs were not placed next to each other. Moldova was set to perform in position 12, following the entry from Poland and before the entry from Iceland.

The two semi-finals and the final were televised in Moldova on Moldova 1 featuring commentary by Galina Timuș, as well as broadcast via radio on Radio Moldova featuring commentary by Cristina Galbici and on Radio Moldova Tineret featuring commentary by Cătălin Ungureanu and Maria-Mihaela Frimu. The Moldovan spokesperson, who announced the top 12-point score awarded by the Moldovan jury during the final, was Gloria Gorceag.

=== Semi-final ===
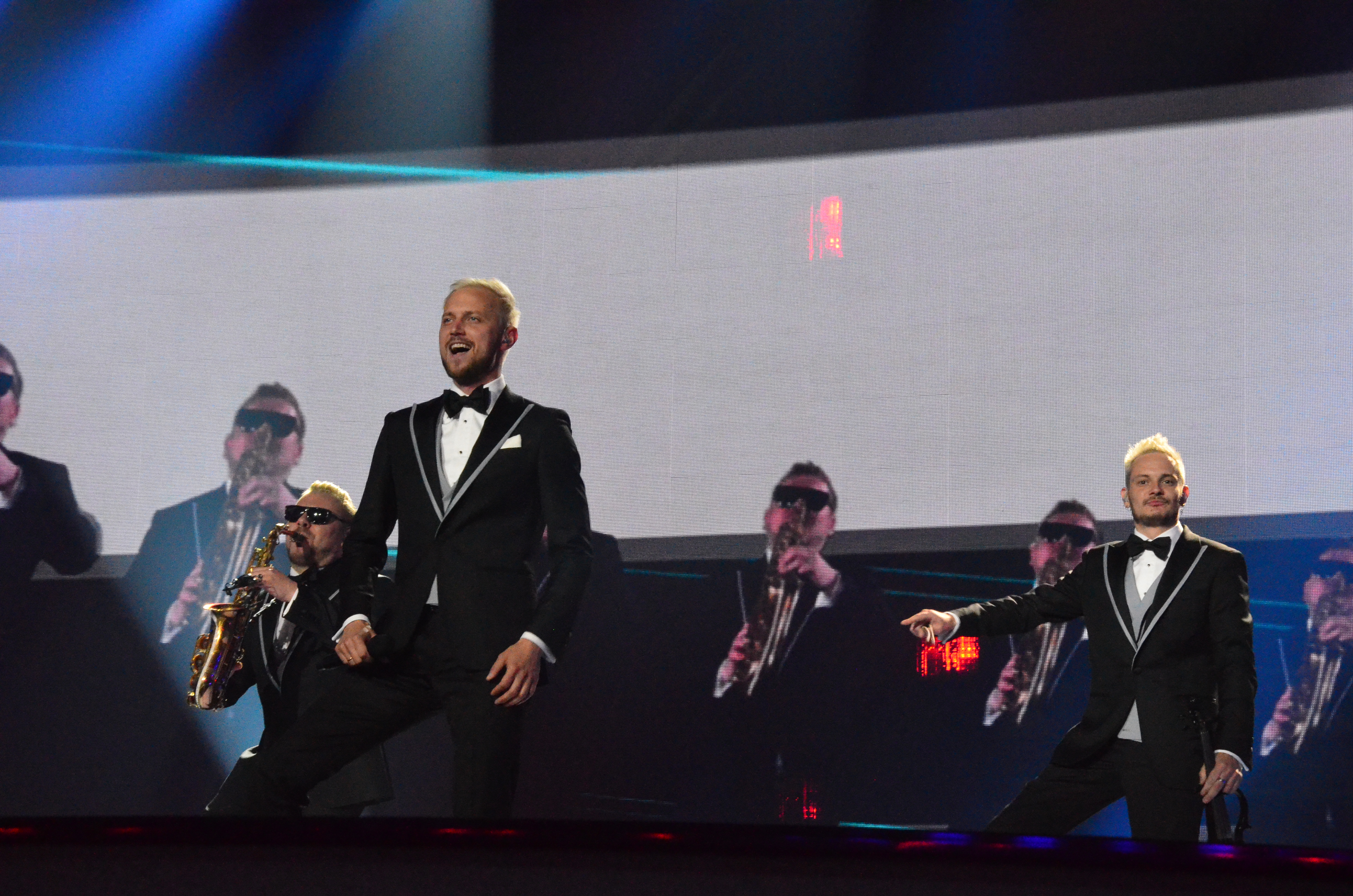
SunStroke Project during a rehearsal before the first semi-final

SunStroke Project took part in technical rehearsals on 1 and 4 May, followed by dress rehearsals on 8 and 9 May. This included the jury show on 8 May where the professional juries of each country watched and voted on the competing entries.

The Moldovan performance featured the members of SunStroke Project dressed in black and grey suits and performing a choreographed routine on stage with three backing vocalists dressed in white blouses and black skirts, which were later changed into wedding dresses. The stage featured black and white lighting and LED screen projections of black and white images, the word "Mamma" in blue colours and images of the group members in a multiplier effect. The backing vocalists that joined SunStroke Project on stage are Catarina Sandu, Dana Markitan and Helena Abegaz.

At the end of the show, Moldova was announced as having finished in the top 10 and subsequently qualifying for the grand final. It was later revealed that Moldova placed second in the semi-final, receiving a total of 291 points: 180 points from the televoting and 111 points from the juries.

=== Final ===
Shortly after the first semi-final, a winners' press conference was held for the ten qualifying countries. As part of this press conference, the qualifying artists took part in a draw to determine which half of the grand final they would subsequently participate in. This draw was done in the reverse order the countries appeared in the semi-final running order. Moldova was drawn to compete in the first half. Following this draw, the shows' producers decided upon the running order of the final, as they had done for the semi-finals. Moldova was subsequently placed to perform in position 7, following the entry from the Netherlands and before the entry from Hungary.

SunStroke Project once again took part in dress rehearsals on 12 and 13 May before the final, including the jury final where the professional juries cast their final votes before the live show. The group performed a repeat of their semi-final performance during the final on 13 May. Moldova placed third in the final, scoring 374 points: 264 points from the televoting and 110 points from the juries. They gave Moldova their best ever placing in the contest; their previous record was sixth which it achieved in 2005.

=== Voting ===
Voting during the three shows involved each country awarding two sets of points from 1-8, 10 and 12: one from their professional jury and the other from televoting. Each nation's jury consisted of five music industry professionals who are citizens of the country they represent, with their names published before the contest to ensure transparency. This jury judged each entry based on: vocal capacity; the stage performance; the song's composition and originality; and the overall impression by the act. In addition, no member of a national jury was permitted to be related in any way to any of the competing acts in such a way that they cannot vote impartially and independently. The individual rankings of each jury member as well as the nation's televoting results were released shortly after the grand final.

Below is a breakdown of points awarded to Moldova and awarded by Moldova in the first semi-final and grand final of the contest, and the breakdown of the jury voting and televoting conducted during the two shows:

==== Points awarded to Moldova ====
Points awarded to Moldova (Semi-final 1)
Score	Televote	Jury
12 points	Australia; Italy; Portugal	Albania; United Kingdom
10 points	Armenia; Azerbaijan; Belgium; Czech Republic; Montenegro; Poland; Spain; Slovenia	Australia; Portugal; Sweden
8 points	Finland; Iceland; Latvia; United Kingdom	Armenia
7 points	Albania; Cyprus; Greece	Italy; Spain
6 points	Georgia	Czech Republic; Finland; Latvia
5 points	Sweden	Azerbaijan; Montenegro
4 points		
3 points		Georgia; Greece
2 points		
1 point		Belgium

Points awarded to Moldova (Final)
Score	Televote	Jury
12 points	Australia; Italy; Portugal; Romania; Ukraine	
10 points	Azerbaijan; Belarus; Bulgaria; Hungary	Australia; Azerbaijan
8 points	Denmark; Ireland; Latvia; Lithuania; San Marino; Sweden	Armenia; Italy; Romania; Sweden
7 points	Belgium; France; Germany; Serbia	Greece; Serbia; Spain
6 points	Armenia; Cyprus; Greece; Iceland; Norway; Poland; Spain; United Kingdom	Macedonia; Portugal; United Kingdom
5 points	Czech Republic; Finland; Israel; Netherlands	
4 points	Croatia; Estonia	Ukraine
3 points	Austria; Montenegro; Slovenia	Czech Republic; Denmark; Finland; Israel
2 points	Macedonia	Norway
1 point	Malta	Latvia

==== Points awarded by Moldova ====
Points awarded by Moldova (Semi-final 1)
Score	Televote	Jury
12 points	Azerbaijan	Portugal
10 points	Albania	Armenia
8 points	Montenegro	Sweden
7 points	Cyprus	Greece
6 points	Portugal	Australia
5 points	Latvia	Georgia
4 points	Armenia	Azerbaijan
3 points	Poland	Finland
2 points	Georgia	Iceland
1 point	Sweden	Poland

Points awarded by Moldova (Final)
Score	Televote	Jury
12 points	Romania	Romania
10 points	Azerbaijan	Bulgaria
8 points	Bulgaria	Sweden
7 points	Greece	Portugal
6 points	Portugal	Armenia
5 points	France	Azerbaijan
4 points	Italy	Australia
3 points	Sweden	Belarus
2 points	Belgium	Austria
1 point	Belarus	Hungary

==== Detailed voting results ====
The following members comprised the Moldovan jury:

- Nelly Ciobanu (jury chairperson) – singer, represented Moldova in the 2009 contest
- Eugen Doibani (Natan) – composer, singer, music producer
- Valeria Barbas – singer
- Angela Socolov – musician
- Paul Gamurari – composer (jury member in semi-final 1)
- Denis Zubov – music producer (jury member in the final)

Detailed voting results from Moldova (Semi-final 1)
R/O	Country	Jury							Televote	
R/O	Country	Natan	N. Ciobanu	V. Barbas	P. Gamurari	A. Socolov	Rank	Points	Rank	Points
01	Sweden	3	2	8	3	2	3	8	10	1
02	Georgia	8	9	10	2	3	6	5	9	2
03	Australia	5	3	7	7	7	5	6	15	
04	Albania	10	17	16	6	11	13		2	10
05	Belgium	13	15	6	12	14	12		12	
06	Montenegro	16	16	17	17	17	17		3	8
07	Finland	7	10	4	14	12	8	3	16	
08	Azerbaijan	6	12	3	9	15	7	4	1	12
09	Portugal	1	1	1	1	1	1	12	5	6
10	Greece	4	8	5	5	4	4	7	11	
11	Poland	9	7	12	13	10	10	1	8	3
12	Moldova									
13	Iceland	11	13	9	10	8	9	2	14	
14	Czech Republic	15	14	14	11	6	14		17	
15	Cyprus	14	6	15	15	13	15		4	7
16	Armenia	2	4	2	4	5	2	10	7	4
17	Slovenia	12	5	13	8	16	11		13	
18	Latvia	17	11	11	16	9	16		6	5

Detailed voting results from Moldova (Final)
R/O	Country	Jury							Televote	
R/O	Country	Natan	N. Ciobanu	V. Barbas	A. Socolov	D. Zubov	Rank	Points	Rank	Points
01	Israel	20	19	15	22	12	19		15	
02	Poland	19	10	20	15	18	16		18	
03	Belarus	7	8	17	7	9	8	3	10	1
04	Austria	12	5	11	11	10	9	2	24	
05	Armenia	10	11	4	6	4	5	6	25	
06	Netherlands	11	2	12	12	23	11		20	
07	Moldova									
08	Hungary	4	12	5	17	14	10	1	11	
09	Italy	25	20	23	10	13	21		7	4
10	Denmark	15	9	19	20	15	15		21	
11	Portugal	13	7	2	3	5	4	7	5	6
12	Azerbaijan	6	22	6	5	6	6	5	2	10
13	Croatia	21	25	22	25	24	25		19	
14	Australia	9	15	8	8	7	7	4	17	
15	Greece	8	13	10	14	21	13		4	7
16	Spain	14	18	25	24	22	23		22	
17	Norway	5	23	9	13	11	12		14	
18	United Kingdom	17	3	14	18	20	14		16	
19	Cyprus	18	14	24	16	19	20		13	
20	Romania	1	1	1	1	1	1	12	1	12
21	Germany	16	16	16	9	25	17		23	
22	Ukraine	22	17	18	21	8	18		12	
23	Belgium	23	24	13	19	17	22		9	2
24	Sweden	2	6	7	4	3	3	8	8	3
25	Bulgaria	3	4	3	2	2	2	10	3	8
26	France	24	21	21	23	16	24		6	5

== After Eurovision ==
After the Eurovision performance there was much discussion about the saxophone player Sergey Stepanov in Moldova's entry, who was the main focus of the 'epic sax guy' Internet meme from the Eurovision Song Contest 2010. This has led to online tribute videos being made by fans which have gone viral, one of which is ten hours long.

== See also ==
- List of music released by Moldovan artists that has charted in major music markets
