= Cleanbreak =

American hard rock band

Cleanbreak is an American heavy metal/hard rock band. The band has released two albums on Scarlet Records.

The band was started with James Durbin from Quiet Riot on vocals, Riot member Mike Flyntz on guitars and Stryper members Robert Sweet and Perry Richardson on bass and drums as well as Giancarlo Floridia from Faithsedge as a songwriter. The band was signed to Frontiers Records from the start. In 2024 the two ex-Stryper musicians were replaced by Alessandro Del Vecchio and Nicholas Papapicco.

== Discography ==
- Coming Home (2022)
- We Are the Fire (2024)
