= Escape the Day =

Swedish electronicore band

- Also known as: Mindscape (2007–2009)
- Origin: Gothenburg, Sweden
- Genres: Electronicore; metalcore; pop metal; alternative metal
- Years active: 2007–2011; 2012–present
- Label: Independent
- Members: Sebastian Ekstrand; Sebastian Westman; Kristian Forsell; Nandanie Dudhnath
- Past members: Sebastian Jarfelt; Niklas Jonsson; Maria Petersen; Neil Grant; Angeline Stenbock; Nidas Richmount; Jennifer Jarnek; Johan Weicht; Patrick Möhlenbrock; Jonas Jenelin

Escape the Day is a Swedish electronicore band from Gothenburg, formed in 2007 as Mindscape, by Sebastian Westman and Patrick Möhlenbrock.

== History ==
Escape the Day began their journey in 2007, as Mindscape. They released a self-titled EP in 2008, which received immediate recognition over the internet and included songs like Derailed and As We Were Once.

After the departure of the screamer Sebastian Jarfelt, the band looked for a new screamer, but never found anyone suitable for their music. In the process of looking for a screamer, they recruited a vocalist, Maria Petersèn. They changed the name of the band to Escape the Day. While no albums or extended plays were made by this 6-member line-up, they recorded and released some full songs, demos and teasers via YouTube between 2009 and 2011 including songs like Turn Back Time.

In 2011, they recruited Jonas Jenelin as screaming vocalist, allowing them to blend their current 90s-trance influenced metal sound with their earlier metalcore style of Mindscape. They released a teaser for a new song titled Rain that featured Jenelin. However, Escape the Day went on hiatus and eventually revealed that both Maria Petersèn and Niklas Jonsson had left the band.

Escape the Day returned in early-2012 as a 7-piece, with Angeline Stenbock on vocals and Neil Grant on drums. They remade two songs, Turn Back Time and As We Were Once, which were both recorded for the video game Rock Band 3.

In 2013, both Stenbock and Grant were replaced by Jennifer Jarnek and Nidas Richmount respectively. This line-up released the song The Way That I Am. In 2014, Jarnek, Richmount and founding bassist Johan Weicht left the band. Weicht was replaced by Kristian Forsell.

Escape the Day released the EP titled Confessions in 2014, which included a remake of their first song Derailed. In 2015, the band released some singles before they released their first full-length album Into Inception in 2016, which saw a continuation in the bands tradition of releasing an extended play or album every two years. However, before the release of their debut album, founding member Patrick Möhlenbrock decided to leave the band.

On 31 December 2017, the band announced, through their Facebook page, that new music was on its way. On 26 February 2018, new single Breaking the Tide was released, their first single in three years. In August, an acoustic rendition of their latest single was released, which was followed with the release of the Acoustic Sessions EP, including the acoustic version of Breaking the Tide and Undone.

On 5 April 2019, the band released their new single An Ocean Between Us.

On 28 May 2021, and two years after their last release, the band released the single Hollow. The band announced that they will release several collections of old demos. In 2021, Demo Collection #1 and Demo Collection #2 were published.

== Musical style ==
Escape the Day's sound is similar to bands, such as Dead by April, and Amaranthe. Their sound is modern metalcore, while blending rock and pop with electronic music. The band has described their sound as "90's dance-trance scene blended with metal and a slight touch of rock and pop."

== Band members ==
=== Current members ===
- Sebastian Westman – guitar, keyboards, programming (2007–present), drums (2014–present)
- Sebastian Ekstrand – clean vocals, keyboards, programming (2008–present)
- Kristian Forsell – bass guitar (2014–present)
- Nandanie "Nando West" Dudhnath – screams (2025–present)

=== Past members ===
- Patrick Möhlenbrock – guitar, keyboards, programming (2007–2016)
- Niklas Jonsson – drums (2007–2011)
- Sebastian Jarfelt – screams (2008–2009)
- Johan Weicht – bass guitar (2008–2014)
- Maria Petersen – clean vocals (2009–2011)
- Neil Grant – drums (2012)
- Angeline Stenbock – clean vocals (2012–2013)
- Nidas Richmount – drums (2012–2013)
- Jonas Jenelin – screams (2012–2025)
- Jennifer Jarnek – clean vocals (2013)

== Discography ==
=== Studio albums ===
- 2016: Into Inception

=== EPs ===
- 2008: Mindscape
- 2014: Confessions
- 2018: Acoustic Sessions

=== Singles ===
- 2013: The Way That I Am
- 2014: A Beautiful Lie
- 2015: Undone
- 2015: Love Me Like U Do (Ellie Goulding Cover)
- 2015: Breathe (feat. Mathilda Ferm)
- 2015: Here I Am
- 2018: Breaking the Tide
- 2018: Breaking the Tide (Acoustic)
- 2019: An Ocean Between Us
- 2021: Hollow
- 2021: Riot
- 2025: If We Never Say Goodbye

=== Demos ===
- 2021: Demo Collection #1
- 2021: Demo Collection #2
