= Olia Tira =

Moldovan singer (born 1988)

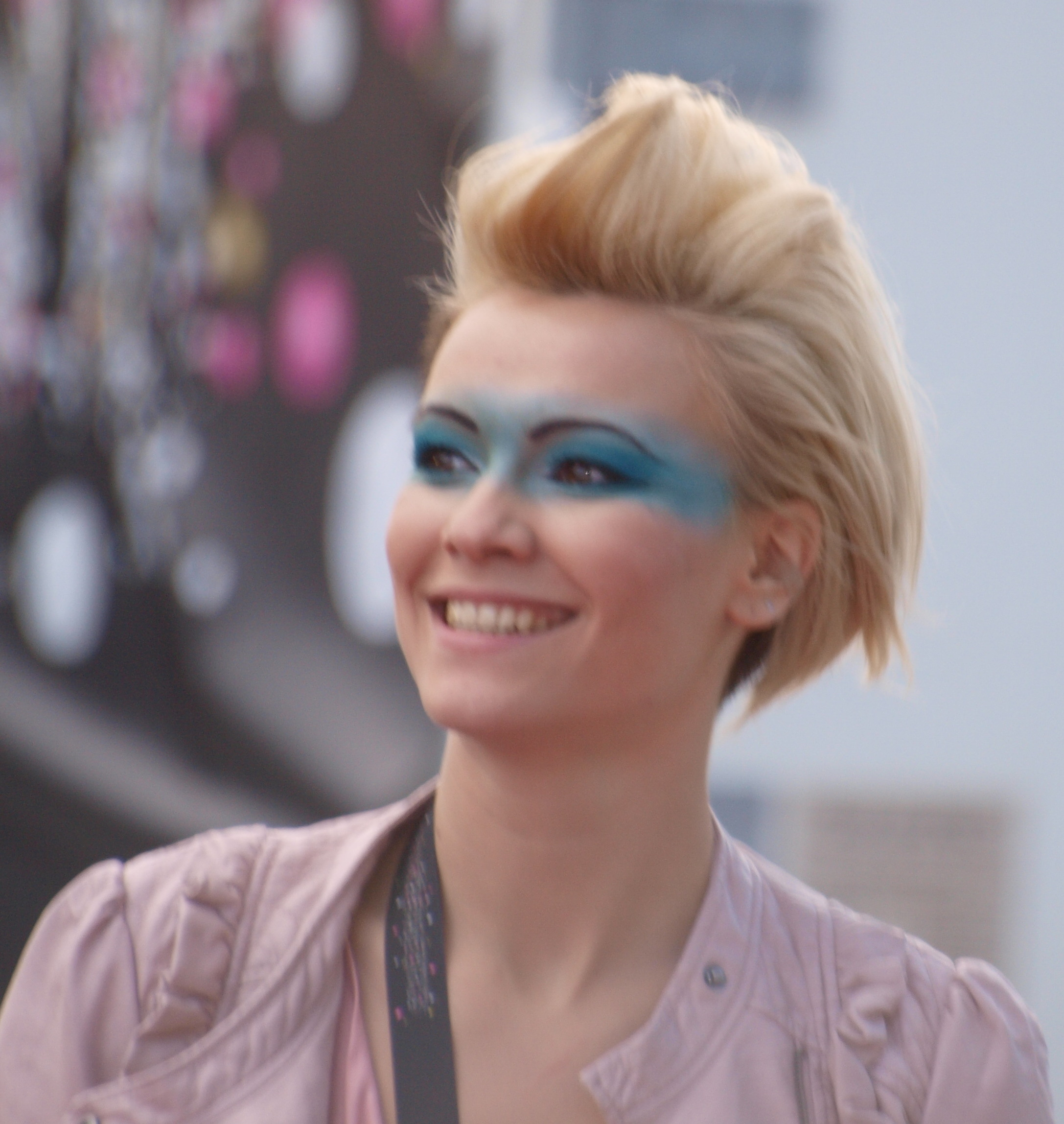
- Tira in 2010

Background information
- Also known as: Flux Light
- Born: Olga Țîra; 1 August 1988 (age 38); Potsdam, East Germany
- Origin: Chișinău, Moldova
- Genres: Pop; dance
- Occupation: Singer
- Years active: 2003–present

Olga Țîra (born 1 August 1988), known professionally as Olia Tira or Flux Light, is a Moldovan singer.

== Early life ==
Tira was born in 1988 into a Soviet military family in Potsdam, East Germany. She spent a few years there and moved to Chișinău. She first appeared in festivals and concerts when she was 14 years old.

Tira attended school in Cahul and is currently a student in the Academy of Music, Theatre and Fine Arts in Chișinău.

Tira's first album, Your Place or Mine?, was released in December 2006 by Nordika Multimedia. The songs were all written by Ruslan Taranu.

== Eurovision Song Contest ==
After participating in the 2006 and 2007 Moldovan national finals and finishing fourth in the 2009 Moldovan national final with Unicul Meu, she was selected to represent Moldova in the Eurovision Song Contest 2010, along with SunStroke Project. They finished 22nd in the Eurovision Song Contest final. She was a finalist in O melodie pentru europa 2014, Moldova's national selection for the Eurovision Song Contest 2014 with the song "Never Stop No". She competed under the stage name, Flux Light. She tied for sixth place and did not qualify to represent Moldova.

Awards and achievements
Preceded by Nelly Ciobanu with Hora Din Moldova	Moldova in the Eurovision Song Contest (with SunStroke Project); 2010	Succeeded by Zdob și Zdub with So Lucky
