= Sergey Stepanov (musician) =

Moldovan saxophonist (born 1984)

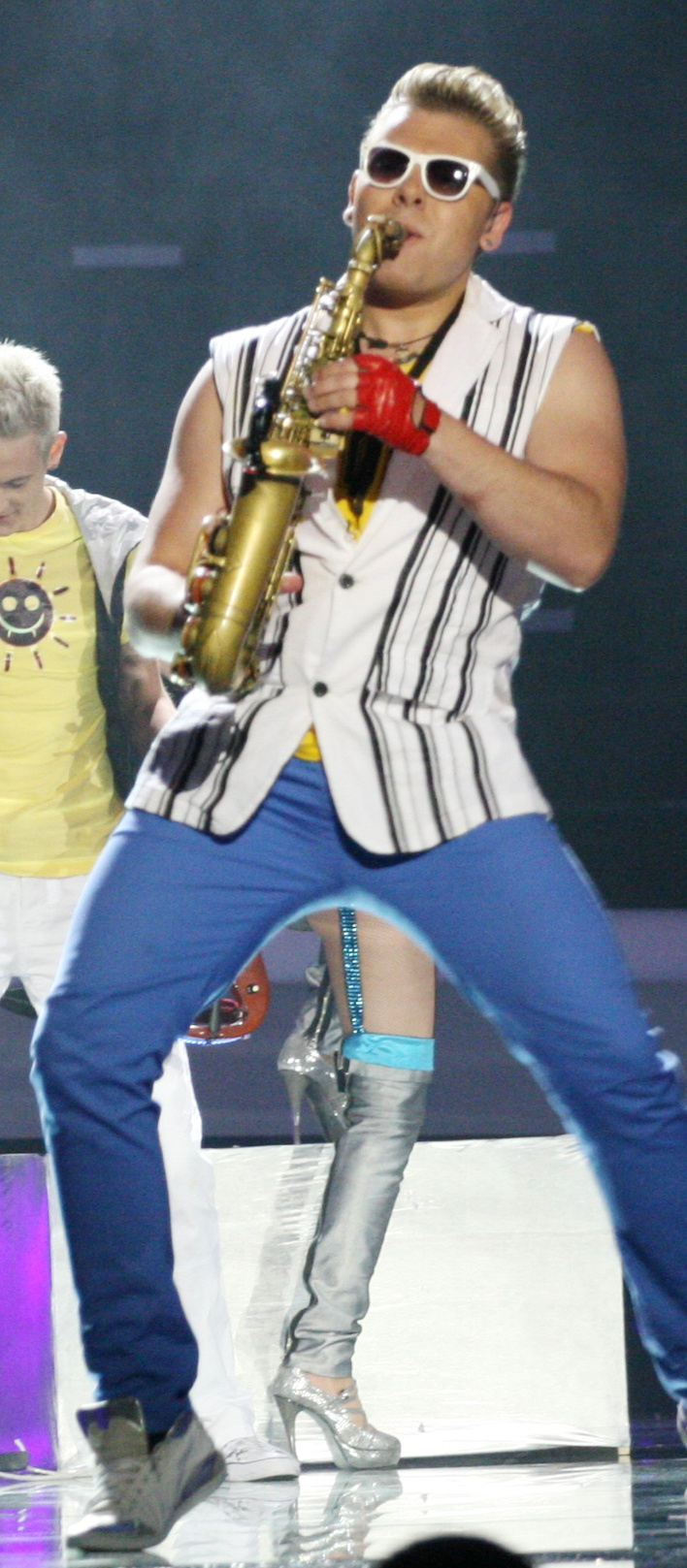
- Stepanov and SunStroke Project at Eurovision Song Contest 2010

Background information
- Also known as: Epic Sax Guy; Ultra Sax Guy
- Born: 3 September 1984 (age 41); Tiraspol, Moldavian SSR, Soviet Union
- Genres: Pop
- Occupations: Saxophonist; Composer

Sergey Igorevich Stepanov (Russian: Сергей Игоревич Степанов, Russian pronunciation: [sʲɪrˈɡʲej ˈiɡərʲɪvʲɪtɕ sʲtʲɪˈpanəf]; Romanian: Serghei Stepanov, IPA: [serˈɡej steˈpanov]; (Note: Sometimes iterated Serghei Igorevici Stepanov after the former Soviet and modern Russian form of the name, also spelled Сергей Степанов in Moldovan Cyrillic.) born 3 September 1984), also known as the Epic Sax Guy, Saxroll or Ultra Sax Guy, is a Moldovan musician and composer and a member of the SunStroke Project.

== Biography ==
Stepanov born in Tiraspol, Moldavian SSR, now Pridnestrovian Moldavian Republic, into a Russian family. Sergey graduated in 2005 from Transnistrian State Arts Institute of Tiraspol. After graduation he was drafted into the Transnistrian army, where he met Anton Ragoza. Later they formed Sunstroke band, now known as SunStroke Project. Sergey is married to Olga Deleu, and they have a son, Mikhail.

As a member of SunStroke Project, Sergey participated at the Eurovision Song Contest 2010 in Bærum, where SunStroke Project finished 22nd, with their song "Run Away". After the contest, Stepanov, thanks to his extravagant look and dancing style, quickly became an Internet meme named "Epic Sax Guy" through a YouTube video with Sergey's instrumental solo performance during the group's Eurovision performance. It quickly went viral and spawned a number of remix videos, including a ten-hour long remixed version.

In 2014, Stepanov's 2010 performance was included in the Eurovision Book of Records, a collection of the most memorable moments in the history of the contest. In 2017, SunStroke Project returned to Eurovision with the song "Hey, Mamma!", and this time finished 3rd. Many notable publications around the world wrote about the comeback of the "Epic Sax Guy", and on the Internet new videos and remixes with Stepanov's performance appeared, this time known as "Ultra Sax Guy". On returning to Moldova, SunStroke Project were awarded the Order of Honour by then-President of Moldova Igor Dodon.

During the Eurovision Song Contest 2021 final, Stepanov was the spokesperson for the Moldovan jury votes.

In 2026, Stepanov auditioned for the nineteenth series of Britain's Got Talent, where judge KSI was ecstatic given he is one of KSI's childhood idols and had previously made a YouTube video as "Black Epic Sax Guy". All of the four judges gave him "yes" votes despite also receiving buzzes from both Simon Cowell and Alesha Dixon, though they were persuaded to allow him to advance as KSI suggested he could perform alongside Stepanov in the Live Shows. He performed with KSI during the fourth Semi-Final, though he placed 5th in the Public Vote which subsequently meant he did not net enough votes to reach the Final.
