= Anton Ragoza =

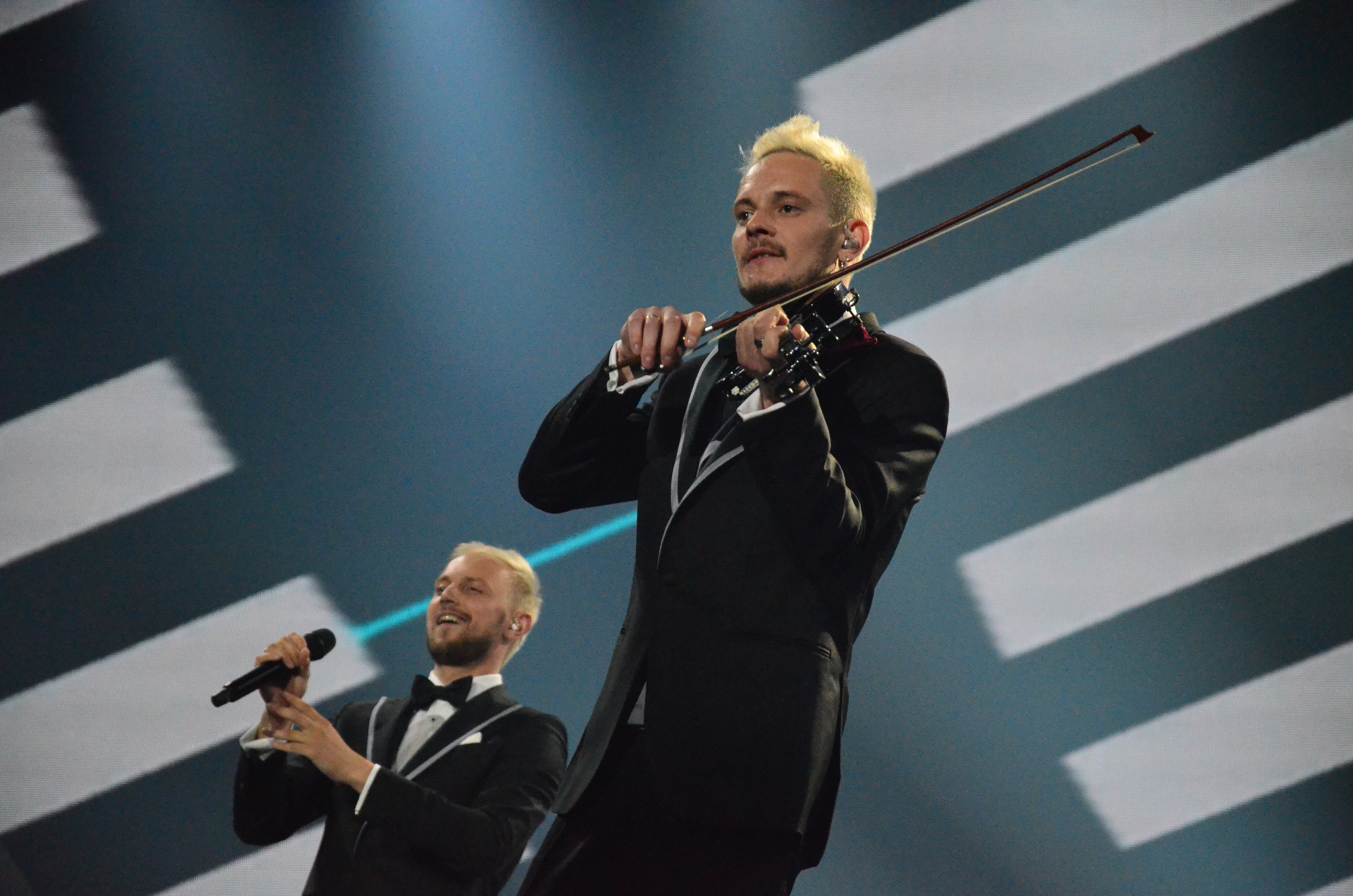
- Ragoza and SunStroke Project at Eurovision Song Contest 2017

Background information
- Also known as: Epic Violin Guy
- Born: 6 January 1986 (age 40); Tiraspol, Moldavian SSR, Soviet Union
- Genres: Pop; dance
- Occupations: Musician; Violin; Composer; songwriter
- Years active: 2000–present
- Labels: Ragoza Music
- Website: https://carnivalbrain.com/biography-anton-ragoza/

Anton Ragoza (Russian: Анто́н Вале́рьевич Рагоза; Romanian: Anton Ragoza; born 6 January 1986), is a Moldovan musician and composer and a former member of the SunStroke Project. He founded the Carnival Brain project in 2019.

== Biography ==
Ragoza graduated in 2005 from Transnistrian State Arts Institute of Tiraspol. After graduation he was drafted into the Transnistrian army, where he met Sergey Stepanov. Later they formed Sunstroke band, now known as SunStroke Project. He wrote his first song at the age of 14, and later wrote a lot of music for the group "SpeX", which performs trance-instrumental music.

He has lived in Tallinn since 2021.

On April 9, 2021, the anthem of the Estonian football club "Jõhvi FC Phoenix" was officially published, the author was Anton Ragoza and his musicians. And the composition was performed by the Moldovan singer and choreographer Ray Bark (Iuri Rîbac).

In May 2023, Anton appeared on the hour-long program "Base" on Estonian Radio 4.

=== SunStroke Project ===
As a member of SunStroke Project, Anton participated at the Eurovision Song Contest 2010 in Oslo, where SunStroke Project finished 22nd, with their song "Run Away". Anton is the composer of this song. In August 2015, he opened his own music label "Ragoza Music", becoming a producer.

In 2017, SunStroke Project returned to Eurovision with the song "Hey, Mamma!", and this time finished 3rd. On returning to Moldova, SunStroke Project were awarded the Order of Honour by then-President of Moldova Igor Dodon.

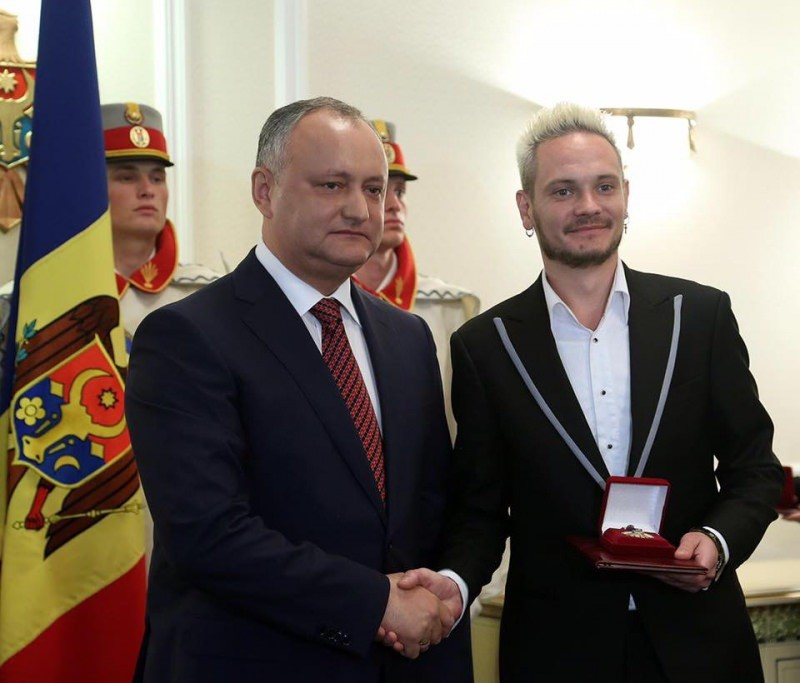
Anton Ragoza was awarded the Order of Honour

In February 2019, he left the group and began pursuing his own musical projects.

=== Carnival Brain ===
In March 2019, he presented his new joint project Carnival Brain with Dumitru Golban. In the same year they released a remix of Mohombi's song "Hello".

At the end of 2023, they released the Estonian-language track "Tere Eesti" and official video in september 2024.

In the Moldovan film "The Power of Probability," the track "Party Don’t Stop" was played. In 2024, they wrote music for the film's teaser "Juvenile Inspektor: The Shadow Over Jõhvi".

Together with the singer Bacho, they released the song "Semafoare" and were selected as participants in the selection round of Eurovision 2025 in Moldova. The video was released on January 17.

=== In the cinema ===
In 2021, he starred in the Moldovan TV series "Sprinter". In 2025, he appeared in the TV series "Juvenile Inspektor: The Shadow Over Jõhvi".

== Personal life ==
Ragoza is married to Victoria Ragoza and has two daughters, which he has from other wives.

== Honors ==
- (Moldova) Order of Honour (2017)
