= SunStroke Project =

Moldovan musical group

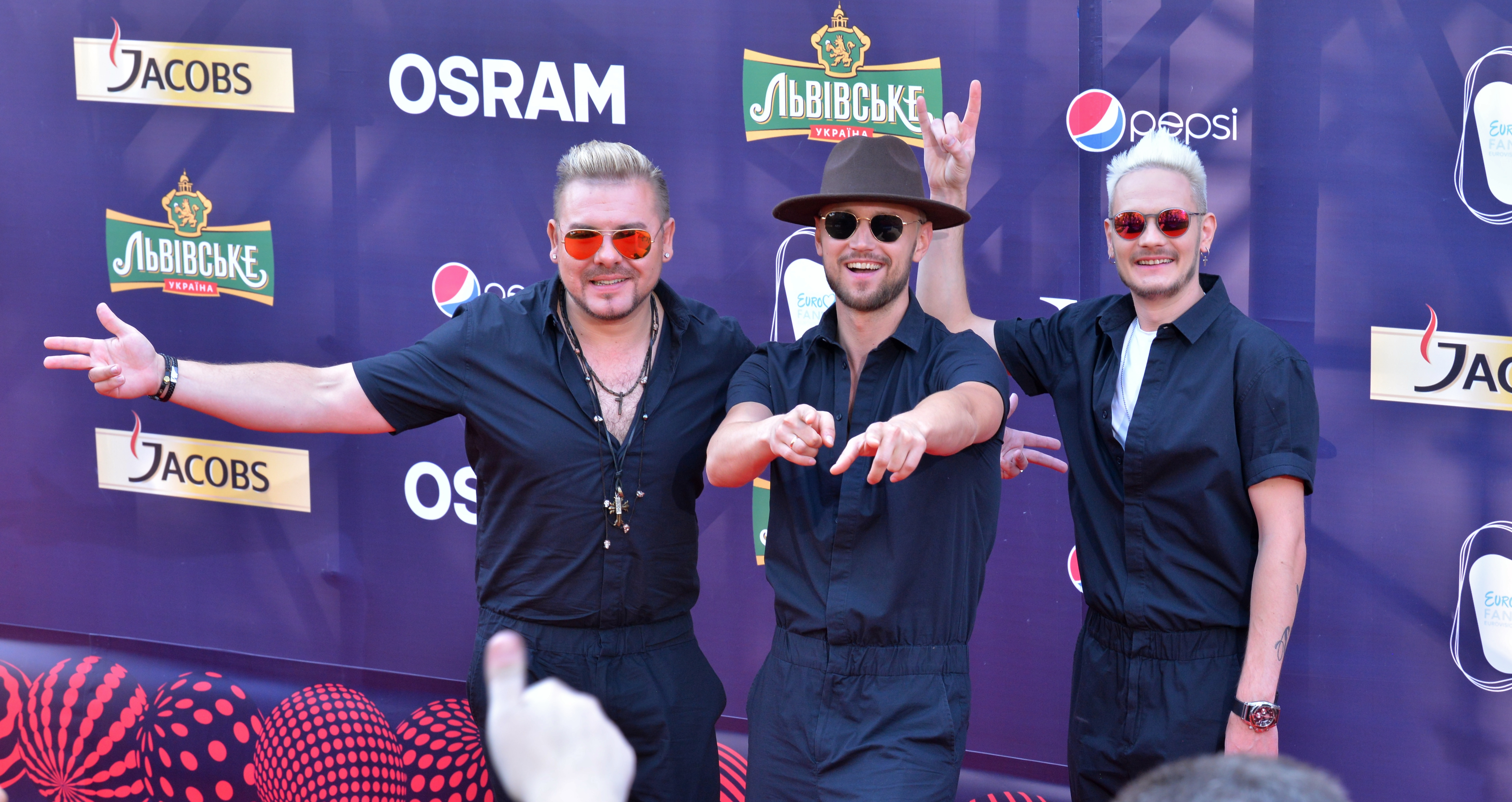
- SunStroke Project at the red carpet ceremony for the Eurovision Song Contest 2017. From left to right: Sergey Stepanov, Sergei Yalovitsky and Anton Ragoza

Background information
- Origin: Chișinău, Moldova
- Genres: Electro; house; dance pop
- Years active: 2007–present
- Labels: Sens; Warner; Bis
- Members: Sergei Yalovitsky; Sergey Stepanov
- Past members: Anton Ragoza; Pasha Parfeny; Alexei Myslitsky

The SunStroke Project is a Moldovan musical group composed of Sergei Yalovitsky (vocals, composer), Sergey Stepanov (saxophonist), and previously Anton Ragoza (violinist, composer) until his departure in 2019. They achieved recognition after representing Moldova in the Eurovision Song Contest 2010 alongside Olia Tira with the song "Run Away", and again in 2017 with "Hey Mamma", finishing in third place in the latter. The name of the group was chosen by Ragoza whilst working in the army with Stepanov, after he had an incident in which he was affected by heat stroke whilst on a field exercise.

== Members ==
Anton Ragoza was born on 6 January 1986 in Tiraspol, Moldavian Soviet Socialist Republic. He is the violinist and primary musical composer for the band. Previously he has conducted the orchestra of Chișinău, Moldova and won a series of prestigious awards in the field of classical music. Anton has a wide experience in performing in bands which play in the modern electronic genre. He identified Justin Timberlake and Michael Jackson as musical inspirations.

Sergey Stepanov is the saxophonist. He was born on 3 September 1984 in Tiraspol. He currently lives in Chișinău. His musical taste took contours on the music of artists such as David Sanborn and Eric Marienthal; and modern DJs like David Guetta, David Vendetta and Tiësto. He loves jazz though he also likes to experiment in vocal house, pop and R&B. He met Ragoza while in the Transnistrian army, and decided to create the band SunStroke Project. In an interview at the 2010 Eurovision Song Contest, he identified Russian saxophonist Igor Butman as his musical inspiration.

Sergei Yalovitsky is the vocalist of the band. He previously worked as a singer on cruise lines. He has won various awards for singing in Moldova and Romania.

== Career ==
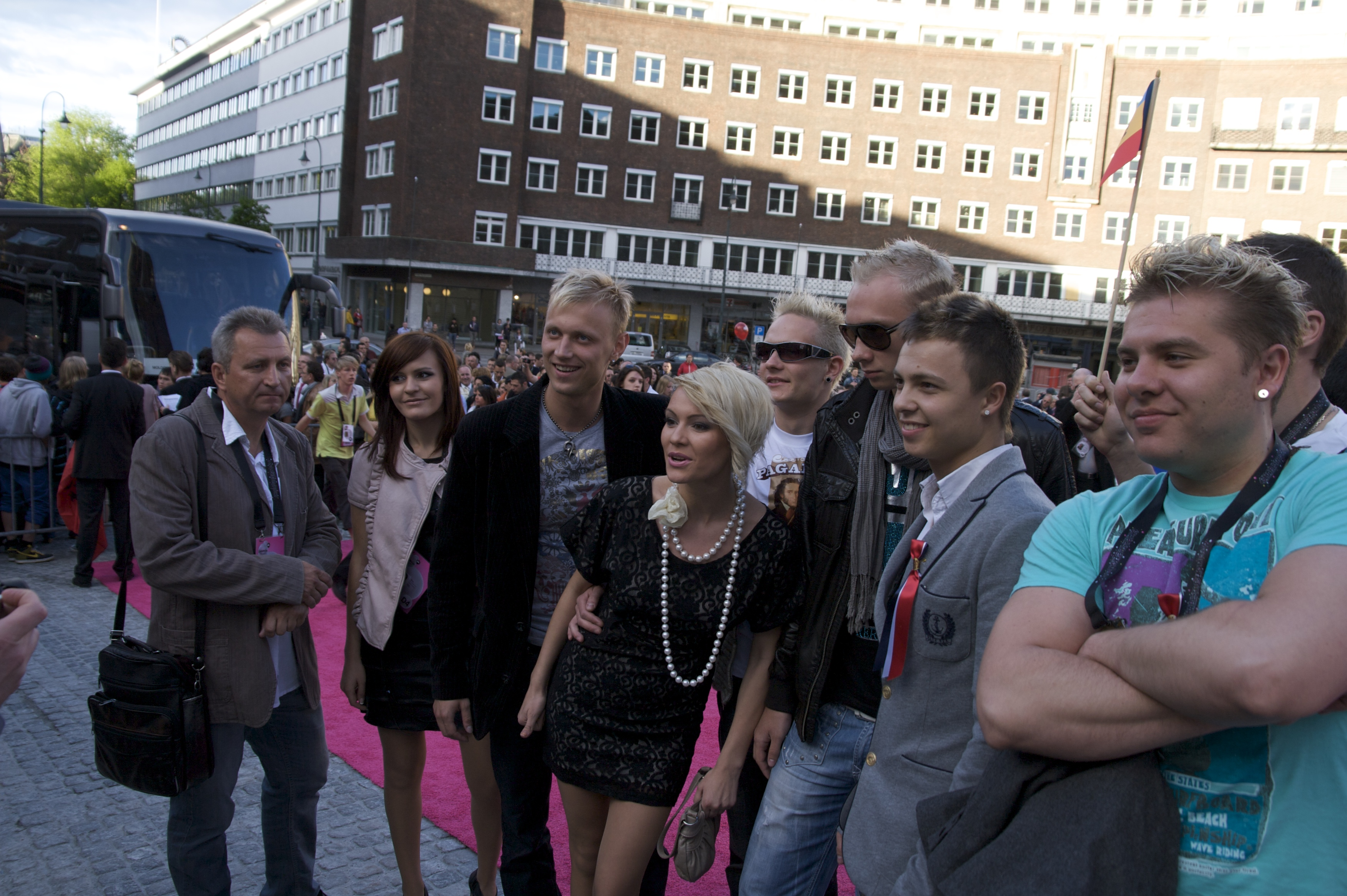
Sunstroke Project and Olia Tira at the red carpet ceremony for the Eurovision Song Contest 2010 in Oslo, Norway

=== 2007–2008: "Sunstroke" era: Early pre-vocal releases ===
Shortly after the band was founded in 2007, their first (and as of 2026, only) official album, Don't Word More.., was released. The album is very rare, and only a few tracks are currently known to have been a part of it. One track, "Scream", is known to be the predecessor to Scream released a few years later with Myslicky.

=== 2008–2009: Pasha Parfeni era ===
From late 2008 to summer 2009, Moldovan vocalist Pasha Parfeni joined the band. Three singles were released during this few-month period. Each were produced by Alex Brashovean of the former Moldovan band O-Zone. They sang for the Eurovision 2009 pre-selection for Moldova, where they took the 3rd place with the hit No Crime. Nelly Ciobanu was elected to represent Moldova at the contest that year.

=== 2010: Eurovision, Myslitsky era ===
"Believe" was the first new single to be released by the band with Sergei Yalovitsky as lead vocalist (A reworked In Your Eyes was the first single to be released with Yalovitsky). It was also their original entry to Moldova's national selection for Eurovision 2010 until it was withdrawn (as well as Olia Tira's entry) in favor of "Run Away". SunStroke Project together with Olia Tira represented Moldova in the Eurovision Song Contest 2010 with the song "Run Away". The final of the O melodie pentru Europa 2010 pre-selection took place in Chișinău on 6 March 2010, with the song gaining the maximum 12 points from both the jury and SMS-voting. The song reached 22nd place in the contest. Along with DJ Alexei Myslicky, several other singles were produced throughout 2010. He later departed to form Offbeat Orchestra in Russia in late 2010.

=== 2011–present: Touring, yearly singles and Eurovision Song Contest entries ===
Since 2011, SunStroke Project has toured extensively and has worked more closely with their longtime label, Sens Music. An entry was made for SunStroke Project and Olia Tira to represent Moldova in the Eurovision Song Contest 2012 with the single "Superman" but it did not make the next stage of selection. SunStroke Project attempted to represent Moldova in the Eurovision Song Contest 2015 entering with two songs: "Lonely" and "Day After Day", the latter with Michael Ra. Both entries qualified to the semi-final from the live audition round. However, as only one song could be chosen per artist, Sunstroke Project chose "Day After Day" to ultimately move forward. After qualifying from the semi-final, they finished third in the national final.

SunStroke Project attempted to represent Moldova in the Eurovision Song Contest 2017 once again, with the upbeat electro-house song "Hey, Mamma!". The band came in first place after a tight voting procedure, qualifying them to represent Moldova in the Song Contest in May. They reached third place with their performance in the 2017 competition, giving Moldova their best result in the contest. On returning to Moldova, SunStroke Project was awarded the Order of Honour by the President of Moldova Igor Dodon. SunStroke Project were also featured in Season 2 of the Netflix series, Travels with My Father, wherein British comedian Jack Whitehall travels to Moldova with his father, Michael Whitehall, in order to meet and perform with the band.

In 2023, the band participated once again in the Moldovan national final with the song "Yummy Mommy" and placed second behind the winner, their former one-time lead singer Pasha Parfeny.

== Discography ==
=== Studio albums ===
Title	Details
Don't Word More..	Released: 2007; Label: Ragoza Music; Formats: Digital download, CD

=== Extended plays ===
Title	Details
Don't Touch the Classics, Vol. 1	Released: 4 December 2015; Label: Ragoza Music; Formats: Digital download, CD
Don't Touch the Classics, Vol. 2	Released: 11 December 2015; Label: Ragoza Music; Formats: Digital download, CD

=== Singles ===
==== As lead artist ====
Title	Year	Peak chart positions										Album
Title	Year	MDA Air.	AUT	BEL (Fl)	FRA	GER	NLD	NOR	SPA	SWE	SWI	Album
"No Crime"	2009	*	—	—	—	—	—	—	—	—	—	Non-album single
"In Your Eyes"	2009	*	—	—	—	—	—	—	—	—	—	Don't Touch the Classics, Vol. 1
"Summer"	2009	*	—	—	—	—	—	—	—	—	—	Don't Touch the Classics, Vol. 2
"Run Away" (with Olia Tira)	2010	*	—	—	—	—	—	7	—	31	—	Non-album single
"Play with Me"	2010	*	—	—	—	—	—	—	—	—	—	Don't Touch the Classics, Vol. 2
"Walking in the Rain"	2011	*	—	—	—	—	—	—	—	—	—	Non-album singles
"Superman" (feat. Olia Tira)	2012	*	—	—	—	—	—	—	—	—	—	Non-album singles
"Amor"	2014	*	—	—	—	—	—	—	—	—	—	Non-album singles
"Sunshine" (feat. Deepcentral)	2014	*	—	—	—	—	—	—	—	—	—	Non-album singles
"Not Giving It Up"	2015	*	—	—	—	—	—	—	—	—	—	Non-album singles
"Lonely"	2016	*	—	—	—	—	—	—	—	—	—	Non-album singles
"Home"	2016	*	—	—	—	—	—	—	—	—	—	Non-album singles
"Maria Juana"	2016	*	—	—	—	—	—	—	—	—	—	Non-album singles
"Dam Dam Dam"	2016	*	—	—	—	—	—	—	—	—	—	Non-album singles
"Hey, Mamma!"	2017	149	27	49	56	52	70	—	89	18	55	Non-album singles
"Sun Gets Down"	2017	*	—	—	—	—	—	—	—	—	—	Non-album singles
"I Want You" (feat. Broono)	2018	*	—	—	—	—	—	—	—	—	—	Non-album singles
"Amor"	2018	*	—	—	—	—	—	—	—	—	—	Non-album singles
"Boomerang"	2019	*	—	—	—	—	—	—	—	—	—	Non-album singles
"Mango"	2019	*	—	—	—	—	—	—	—	—	—	Non-album singles
"D.F.M.M."	2019	*	—	—	—	—	—	—	—	—	—	Non-album singles
"Рosomakha"	2019	*	—	—	—	—	—	—	—	—	—	Non-album singles
"Pepperoni"	2020	*	—	—	—	—	—	—	—	—	—	Non-album singles
"Rasstrelyay Lyubovyu"	2020	*	—	—	—	—	—	—	—	—	—	Non-album singles
"Shake It" (featuring Fox Banger)	2020	*	—	—	—	—	—	—	—	—	—	Non-album singles
"Beloe"	2021	*	—	—	—	—	—	—	—	—	—	Non-album singles
"Cosa Nostra"	2021	*	—	—	—	—	—	—	—	—	—	Non-album singles
"Netflix & Chill" (featuring Fox Banger)	2021	*	—	—	—	—	—	—	—	—	—	Non-album singles
"Champagne"	2022	*	—	—	—	—	—	—	—	—	—	Non-album singles
"Yummy Mommy"	2022	36	—	—	—	—	—	—	—	—	—	Non-album singles
"Ghostbusters"	2024	—	—	—	—	—	—	—	—	—	—	Non-album singles
"Dancing Like it's '74"	2025	—	—	—	—	—	—	—	—	—	—	
"—" denotes a single that did not chart or was not released. "*" denotes that the chart did not exist at that time.

==== As featured artist ====
Title	Year	Album
"Bad Girls" (Olia Tira feat. Sunstroke Project)	2011	Non-album singles
"Go On" (Jucătoru feat. Sunstroke Project)	2013	Non-album singles
"Razorvu mechty" (Mila Kulikova feat. Sunstroke Project)	2014	Non-album singles
"Tocame" (Timebelle feat. Sunstroke Project)	2018	Non-album singles

==== Promotional singles ====
Title	Year	Album
"Spit"	2007	Non-album singles
"Rain"	2007	Non-album singles
"Skream"	2007	Non-album singles
"Believe"	2010	Don't Touch the Classics, Vol. 1
"Sax U Up"	2010	Don't Touch the Classics, Vol. 2
"Epic Sax"	2010	Don't Touch the Classics, Vol. 1
"Scream"	2010	Don't Touch the Classics, Vol. 1
"Listen"	2010	Don't Touch the Classics, Vol. 2
"Sunshine Day"	2011	Non-album single
"Set My Soul On"	2012	Don't Touch the Classics, Vol. 1
"Party"	2013	Don't Touch the Classics, Vol. 2
"Ce bine imi pare" (feat. Alex Calancea Band)	2013	Non-album single
"Look At Me" (feat. Olia Tira)	2016	Non-album single
"—" denotes a single that did not chart or was not released.

=== Cover songs ===
Title	Year
"Rise Up" (Yves Larock cover)	2010
"Desire" (Michael Canitrot cover)	2010

== Internet phenomena ==
Sergey Stepanov's saxophone solo in "Run Away" became famous across the Internet as a meme known as "Epic Sax Guy" or "Saxroll". Remixes of his saxophone solo have millions of hits on YouTube. Run Away also became a popular choice of background music in "Best Moments" compilations in video games like Hearthstone and Rainbow Six Siege.

In December 2010, SunStroke Project appeared on the Moldovan TV programme Sare şi piper and sang a song titled "Epic Sax", named after the meme.

The phrase "Epic Sax Guys" forms part of the lyrics of the SunStroke Project's single "Superman", when they unsuccessfully attempted to represent Moldova in the 2012 Eurovision Song Contest.

Stepanov himself acknowledged his viral fame playing the "Run Away" saxophone riff when the group was interviewed during the first semi-finals of the Eurovision Song Contest 2017. During the performance of "Hey Mamma" in the 2017 contest, Stepanov again became a minor internet meme in the form of "Ultra Sax Guy".

In 2020, the video game character Jax got a so-called "friendship"-ending move in the Aftermath expansion of the video game Mortal Kombat 11, in which Jax was playing the sax in a similar fashion to Stepanov. The scene, titled "Epic Jax Guy", went viral with over half a million views on YouTube.

== See also ==
- List of music released by Moldovan artists that has charted in major music markets

Awards and achievements
Preceded by Nelly Ciobanu with "Hora Din Moldova"	Moldova in the Eurovision Song Contest (with Olia Tira); 2010	Succeeded by Zdob și Zdub with "So Lucky"
Preceded by Lidia Isac with "Falling Stars"	Moldova in the Eurovision Song Contest; 2017	Succeeded by DoReDoS with "My Lucky Day"
