= Hey Mamma =

2017 song by SunStroke Project

Single by SunStroke Project
- Released: 6 February 2017
- Genre: EDM; electropop; house
- Length: 2:59
- Label: Ragoza Music
- Composers: SunStroke Project; Mihail Cebotarenco
- Lyricist: Alina Galetskaya

SunStroke Project singles chronology
"Dam Dam Dam" (2016)	"Hey Mamma" (2017)	"Sun Gets Down" (2017)

Eurovision Song Contest 2017 entry
- Country: Moldova
- Artist: SunStroke Project
- Language: English
- Composers: SunStroke Project; Mihail Cebotarenco
- Lyricist: Alina Galetskaya

Finals performance
- Semi-final result: 2nd
- Semi-final points: 291
- Final result: 3rd
- Final points: 374

Entry chronology
- ◄ "Falling Stars" (2016)
- "My Lucky Day" (2018) ►

"Hey Mamma" (also "Hey, Mamma!") is a song written and performed by the Moldovan group SunStroke Project. It was released as a digital download on 6 February 2017 by Ragoza Music. It represented Moldova in the Eurovision Song Contest 2017.

== Eurovision Song Contest ==
SunStroke Project was confirmed to be taking part in O melodie pentru Europa 2017, Moldova's national selection for the Eurovision Song Contest 2017 on 18 January 2017 and later confirmed to have qualified to the semi-finals after a live audition on 20 January. The group won the jury vote in the semi-final, held on 24 February, and qualified directly for the final. During the final, held on 25 February, the group was second with the juries and first with the televoters, effectively winning the tiebreak and being declared the winner. Moldova competed in the second half of the first semi-final for the Eurovision Song Contest and went through to the Grand Final.

In the Grand Final, it finished third overall with 374 points, which is Moldova's best result in the contest to date.

== Track listing ==
Digital download
No.	Title	Length
1.	"Hey Mamma" (radio edit)	2:59
2.	"Hey Mamma" (karaoke version)	2:59

=== Weekly charts ===
2017 weekly chart performance for "Hey Mamma"
Chart (2017)	Peak position
Austria (Ö3 Austria Top 40)	27
Belgium (Ultratop 50 Flanders)	49
Belgium (Ultratip Bubbling Under Wallonia)	30
France (SNEP)	56
Germany (GfK)	52
Hungary (Single Top 40)	15
Hungary (Stream Top 40)	34
Netherlands (Single Top 100)	70
Scotland Singles (OCC)	51
Spain (Promusicae)	34
Sweden (Sverigetopplistan)	18
Switzerland (Schweizer Hitparade)	55
UK Singles Downloads (OCC)	51

2023 weekly chart performance for "Hey Mamma"
Chart (2023)	Peak position
Moldova Airplay (TopHit)	150

2025 weekly chart performance for "Hey Mamma"
Chart (2025)	Peak position
Moldova Airplay (TopHit)	149

== Release history ==
Region	Date	Format	Label
Worldwide	6 February 2017	Digital download	Ragoza Music

== See also ==
- List of music released by Moldovan artists that has charted in major music markets
