= Moldova in the Eurovision Song Contest 2020 =

- Eurovision Song Contest 2020
- Participating broadcaster: TeleRadio-Moldova (TRM)
- Country: Moldova
- Selection process: Finala națională 2020
- Selection date: 29 February 2020

Competing entry
- Song: "Prison"
- Artist: Natalia Gordienko
- Songwriters: Dimitris Kontopoulos; Philipp Kirkorov; Sharon Vaughn

Placement
- Final result: Contest cancelled

Participation chronology

Moldova was set to be represented at the Eurovision Song Contest 2020 with the song "Prison" written by Dimitris Kontopoulos, Philipp Kirkorov and Sharon Vaughn. The song was performed by Natalia Gordienko. Songwriter Philipp Kirkorov represented Russia in the Eurovision Song Contest 1995 with the song "Kolybelnaya dlya vulkana" where he placed seventeenth, while Natalia Gordienko had previously represented Moldova in the Eurovision Song Contest in 2006 together with Arsenium and Connect-R, placing twentieth with the song "Loca". The Moldovan broadcaster TeleRadio-Moldova (TRM) organised the national final Finala națională 2020 in order to select the Moldovan entry for the 2020 contest in Rotterdam, Netherlands. 34 entries competed to represent Moldova in Rotterdam, with 20 being shortlisted to participate in the televised national final which took place on 29 February 2020 after auditioning in front of a jury panel. "Prison" performed by Natalia Gordienko emerged as the winner after gaining the most points following the combination of votes from a jury panel and a public televote.

Moldova was drawn to compete in the second semi-final of the Eurovision Song Contest which took place on 14 May 2020. However, the contest was cancelled due to the COVID-19 pandemic.

== Background ==
Prior to the 2020 Contest, Moldova had participated in the Eurovision Song Contest fifteen times since its first entry in 2005. The nation's best placing in the contest was third, which it achieved in 2017 with the song "Hey, Mamma!" performed by SunStroke Project. To this point, Moldova have achieved another three top ten placings at the contest: in 2005 where "Boonika bate toba" performed by Zdob și Zdub placed sixth, in 2007 where "Fight" performed by Natalia Barbu placed tenth, and in 2018 where "My Lucky Day" performed by DoReDoS also placed tenth. In the 2019 contest, "Stay" performed by Anna Odobescu failed to qualify Moldova to compete in the final.

The Moldovan national broadcaster, TeleRadio-Moldova (TRM), broadcast the event within Moldova and organised the selection process for the nation's entry. TRM confirmed their intentions to participate at the 2020 Eurovision Song Contest on 13 November 2019. Moldova has selected their entry via a national selection show since 2008, a procedure that was continued for their 2020 participation.

== Before Eurovision ==
=== Finala națională 2020 ===
Finala națională 2020 was the national final format developed by TRM in order to select Moldova's entry for the Eurovision Song Contest 2020. The event took place at the TRM Studio 2 in Chișinău, hosted by Elena Băncilă, Iurie Gologan and Doina Stimpovschii with Daniela Crudu reporting from the green room, and included a final to be held on 29 February 2020. The show was broadcast on Moldova 1, Radio Moldova Actualități, Radio Moldova Tineret and Radio Moldova Muzical as well as online via TRM's official website trm.md and the broadcaster's Facebook and YouTube pages.

==== Competing entries ====
Artists and composers had the opportunity to submit their entries between 27 December 2019 and 17 January 2020. Artists could submit more than one song, and an international act was able to compete only if they were part of a duo or group where 50% of the lead vocalists were of Moldovan nationality. At the conclusion of the submission deadline, 36 valid entries out of 37 were received by the broadcaster; "Adio" performed by Che-MD and Irina Revenco was disqualified as the song had been published and performed publicly prior to 1 September 2019.

The live audition round took place on 1 February 2020 at TRM Studio 2 in Chișinău where 20 finalists were selected to advance. The auditions were broadcast on Moldova 2 as well as online via trm.md and via TRM's Facebook and YouTube pages. The jury panel that evaluated the songs during the live auditions and selected the 20 finalists consisted of Anatol Chiriac (composer), Gabriela Tocari (conductor of the "Moldova" Choral Chapel), Andriano Marian (conductor of the Youth Orchestra), Pavel Gamurari (President of the Union of Composers of Moldova) and Mihai Agafiță (Artistic Director and Principal Conductor of the National Philharmonic). Entries were assessed on criteria such as voice quality, stage presence and strength of the composition. Diana Brescan and Liusia Znamensky did not attend the auditions and therefore their respective songs "Let's Go Together" and "Love No More" were disqualified.

Among the finalists were 2006 Moldovan Eurovision entrant Natalia Gordienko, 2008 Moldovan Eurovision entrant Geta Burlacu, 2012 Moldovan Eurovision entrant Pasha Parfeny and 2012 Moldovan Junior Eurovision entrant Denis Midone. On 29 February 2020, "Răspunde!" performed by Geta Burlacu was withdrawn from the competition.

Results of the Live Audition Round – 1 February 2020
| R/O | Artist | Song | Songwriter(s) |
|---|---|---|---|
| 1 | Pelageya Stefoglo | "Empathy" | Ylva Persson, Linda Persson, Rickard Bonde Truumeel |
| 2 | Diana Rotaru | "Dale dale" | Eugen Doibani |
| 3 | Lave | "Wildfire" | Aaron Sibley |
| 4 | Pasha Parfeny | "My Wine" | Pasha Parfeny, Vica Demici |
| 5 | Denis Midone | "Like a Champion" | Ylva Persson, Linda Persson |
| 6 | Alexandru Cibotaru | "Cine te-a facut să plângi" | Georgeta Voinovan |
| 7 | Irina Kit | "Chain Reaction" | John Ballard, Petrus Wessman |
| 8 | Lavinia Rusu | "Touch" | Lavinia Rusu, Jack Hardman, Rob Price |
| 9 | Angel Kiss | "My Own Queen" | Markus Lawyer, Elina Sadcova |
| 10 | Angel Kiss | "You Are My Dance" | Ivan Aculov, Elina Sadcova |
| 11 | Carolina Rakoviță | "Dancing in the Sunrise" | Markus Lawyer, Carolina Rakoviță |
| 12 | Petronela Donciu and Andreea Portărescu | "We Will Be Legends" | José Juan Santana, Rafael Artesero, Viorica Atanasov |
| 13 | Natalia Gordienko | "Prison" | Dimitris Kontopoulos, Philipp Kirkorov, Sharon Vaughn |
| 14 | Julia Ilienko feat. Mishel Dar | "Tears" | Mishel Dar |
| 15 | Valeria Pașa | "It's Time" | Valeria Pașa, Smally, Gloria Gorceag |
| 16 | Live Beat | "Love Me Now" | Live Beat |
| 17 | Sasha Letty | "Summer of Love" | Jacob Jonia |
| 18 | Katerina S | "We Are Done" | Ivan Akulov, Alina Druta, Milena Ludajić |
| 19 | Sasha Bognibov | "Big Brother" | Jacob Jonia |
| 20 | Georgeta Burlacu | "Răspunde!" | Viorica Nagacevschi, Aurel Chirtoacă |
| 21 | Tudor Bumbac | "Te-am vazut în vis pe tine" | Tudor Bumbac |
| 22 | Ray Barc | "I'm Shy" | Iuri Victor Ribac |
| 23 | Catarina Sandu | "Die for You" | Dimitri Stassos, Jennifer Aalto Kallunki, Nikos Sofis |
| 24 | Olea Roșu | "Alive" | Dan Iacovlev, Elena Buga |
| 25 | Danny Cruise | "My Love" | Danny Cruise |
| 26 | Diana Popa | "Believe Me" | Jacob Jonia |
| 27 | Valentin Uzun and Irina Kovalsky | "Moldovița" | Valentin Uzun |
| 28 | Maxim Zavidia | "Take Control" | Maxim Zavidia, Alexey Streltsov, Nikos Sofis |
| 29 | Vovian | "10 minuni în Moldova" | Unknown |
| 30 | Nicolae Untilă | "Call Me Please" | Unknown |
| 31 | Lanjeron | "Hi Five" | Mihai Todor, Serghei Ivanov, Vitalie Catana |
| 32 | Dima Jelezoglo | "Do It Slow" | Dima Jelezoglo |
| 33 | Viorela Moraru | "Remedy" | Ylva Persson, Linda Persson, Rickard Bonde Truumeel, Patric Skog, Will Taylor |
| 34 | Maria Ciolac | "Our Home" | Maria Ciolac |
| —N/a | Che-MD feat Irina Revenco | "Adio" | Mihail Smolenko |
| —N/a | Diana Brescan | "Let's Go Together" | Anton Ragoza, Serghei Harlamov, Diana Brescan |
| —N/a | Liusia Znamensky | "Love No More" | Unknown |

| Artist | Song | Songwriter(s) |
|---|---|---|
| Alexandru Cibotaru | "Cine te-a facut să plângi" | Georgeta Voinovan |
| Catarina Sandu | "Die for You" | Dimitri Stassos, Jennifer Aalto Kallunki, Nikos Sofis |
| Denis Midone | "Like a Champion" | Ylva Persson, Linda Persson, Isak Alverus, Dael Damsa |
| Diana Rotaru | "Dale dale" | Eugen Doibani |
| Dima Jelezoglo | "Do It Slow" | Dimitrii Jelezoglo |
| Geta Burlacu | "Răspunde!" | Viorica Nagacevschi, Aurel Chirtoacă |
| Irina Kit | "Chain Reaction" | John Ballard, Petrus Wessman |
| Julia Ilienko feat. Mishel Dar | "Tears" | Mishel Dar |
| Lanjeron | "Hi Five" | Mihai Todor, Serghei Ivanov, Vitalie Catana |
| Lavinia Rusu | "Touch" | Lavinia Rusu, Jack Hardman, Rob Price |
| Live Beat Orchestra | "Love Me Now" | Live Beat Orchestra |
| Maria Ciolac | "Our Home" | Maria Ciolac |
| Maxim Zavidia | "Take Control" | Maxim Zavidia, Alexey Streltsov, Nikos Sofis |
| Natalia Gordienko | "Prison" | Dimitris Kontopoulos, Philipp Kirkorov, Sharon Vaughn |
| Pasha Parfeny | "My Wine" | Pasha Parfeny, Victoria Demici |
| Petronela Donciu and Andreea Portărescu | "We Will Be Legends" | José Juan Santana, Rafael Artesero, Viorica Atanasov |
| Sasha Letty | "Summer of Love" | Jacob Jonia |
| Valentin Uzun and Irina Kovalsky | "Moldovița" | Valentin Uzun |
| Valeria Pașa | "It's Time" | Valeria Pașa, Smally, Gloria Gorceag |
| Viorela Moraru | "Remedy" | Ylva Persson, Linda Persson, Rickard Bonde Truumeel |

==== Final ====
The final took place on 29 February 2020. Twenty songs competed and the winner was selected based on the combination of a public televote and the votes of an expert jury. The jury that voted in the final included Anatol Chiriac (composer), Ilona Stepan (conductor), Roman Burlaca (director), Victoria Tcacenco (Associate Professor at the Academy of Music, Theatre and Fine Arts), Igor Rusu (singer), Valeria Barbas (singer and composer) and Eugen Boico (General Director of Publicis Moldova). In addition to the performances of the competing entries, 2007 Moldovan Eurovision entrant Natalia Barbu and the Moldovan National Symphony Orchestra performed as guests. "Prison" performed by Natalia Gordienko was selected as the winner.

Final – 29 February 2020
| R/O | Artist | Song | Jury | | Televote | | Total | Place |
| R/O | Artist | Song | Votes | Points | Votes | Points | Total | Place |
|---|---|---|---|---|---|---|---|---|
| 1 | Denis Midone | "Like a Champion" | 0 | 0 | 117 | 0 | 0 | 16 |
| 2 | Natalia Gordienko | "Prison" | 64 | 12 | 3,022 | 12 | 24 | 1 |
| 3 | ~~Geta Burlacu~~ | ~~"Răspunde!"~~ | — | — | ~~7~~ | — | — | — |
| 4 | Viorela Moraru | "Remedy" | 0 | 0 | 46 | 0 | 0 | 18 |
| 5 | Valentin Uzun and Irina Kovalsky | "Moldovița" | 9 | 0 | 629 | 6 | 6 | 9 |
| 6 | Lavinia Rusu | "Touch" | 38 | 6 | 130 | 0 | 6 | 7 |
| 7 | Dima Jelezoglo | "Do It Slow" | 3 | 0 | 343 | 4 | 4 | 11 |
| 8 | Diana Rotaru | "Dale dale" | 42 | 7 | 99 | 0 | 7 | 6 |
| 9 | Pasha Parfeny | "My Wine" | 60 | 10 | 1,617 | 10 | 20 | 2 |
| 10 | Live Beat Orchestra | "Love Me Now" | 15 | 2 | 96 | 0 | 2 | 12 |
| 11 | Valeria Pașa | "It's Time" | 27 | 3 | 500 | 5 | 8 | 5 |
| 12 | Maria Ciolac | "Our Home" | 0 | 0 | 82 | 0 | 0 | 17 |
| 13 | Sasha Letty | "Summer of Love" | 0 | 0 | 37 | 0 | 0 | 19 |
| 14 | Irina Kit | "Chain Reaction" | 10 | 0 | 73 | 0 | 0 | 14 |
| 15 | Petronela Donciu and Andreea Portărescu | "We Will Be Legends" | 13 | 1 | 240 | 3 | 4 | 10 |
| 16 | Lanjeron | "Hi Five" | 38 | 5 | 154 | 1 | 6 | 8 |
| 17 | Julia Ilienko feat. Mishel Dar | "Tears" | 7 | 0 | 229 | 2 | 2 | 13 |
| 18 | Catarina Sandu | "Die for You" | 31 | 4 | 824 | 8 | 12 | 4 |
| 19 | Alexandru Cibotaru | "Cine te-a facut să plângi" | 2 | 0 | 43 | 0 | 0 | 15 |
| 20 | Maxim Zavidia | "Take Control" | 47 | 8 | 650 | 7 | 15 | 3 |

Detailed Jury Votes
| R/O | Song | A. Chiriac | I. Stepan | R. Burlaca | V. Tcacenco | I. Rusu | V. Barbas | E. Boico | Total |
|---|---|---|---|---|---|---|---|---|---|
| 1 | "Like a Champion" | | | | | | | | 0 |
| 2 | "Prison" | 7 | 8 | 12 | 5 | 10 | 10 | 12 | 64 |
| 3 | ~~"Răspunde!"~~ | — | — | — | — | — | — | — | — |
| 4 | "Remedy" | | | | | | | | 0 |
| 5 | "Moldovița" | 4 | | 5 | | | | | 9 |
| 6 | "Touch" | 10 | 1 | 6 | | 5 | 6 | 10 | 38 |
| 7 | "Do It Slow" | | | | 3 | | | | 3 |
| 8 | "Dale Dale" | 5 | 7 | | 10 | 12 | 5 | 3 | 42 |
| 9 | "My Wine" | 12 | 10 | 7 | 7 | 8 | 8 | 8 | 60 |
| 10 | "Love Me Now" | | | 2 | 1 | | 7 | 5 | 15 |
| 11 | "It's Time" | 6 | 5 | 4 | 6 | 3 | 3 | | 27 |
| 12 | "Our Home" | | | | | | | | 0 |
| 13 | "Summer of Love" | | | | | | | | 0 |
| 14 | "Chain Reaction" | 3 | | 3 | 2 | 1 | | 1 | 10 |
| 15 | "We Will Be Legends" | 1 | 2 | | | 2 | 2 | 6 | 13 |
| 16 | "Hi Five" | | 4 | 8 | 8 | 7 | 4 | 7 | 38 |
| 17 | "Tears" | | 3 | | 4 | | | | 7 |
| 18 | "Die for You" | 2 | 6 | 1 | | 6 | 12 | 4 | 31 |
| 19 | "Cine te-a facut să plângi" | | | | | | | 2 | 2 |
| 20 | "Take Control" | 8 | 12 | 10 | 12 | 4 | 1 | | 47 |

=== Promotion ===
Natalia Gordienko specifically promoted "Prison" as the Moldovan Eurovision entry on 5 March 2020 by performing the song as a guest during the Romanian Eurovision national final.

== At Eurovision ==
According to Eurovision rules, all nations with the exceptions of the host country and the "Big Five" (France, Germany, Italy, Spain and the United Kingdom) are required to qualify from one of two semi-finals in order to compete for the final; the top ten countries from each semi-final progress to the final. The European Broadcasting Union (EBU) split up the competing countries into six different pots based on voting patterns from previous contests, with countries with favourable voting histories put into the same pot. On 28 January 2020, a special allocation draw was held which placed each country into one of the two semi-finals, as well as which half of the show they would perform in. Moldova was placed into the second semi-final, to be held on 14 May 2020, and was scheduled to perform in the first half of the show. However, due to 2019-20 pandemic of Coronavirus, the contest was cancelled.

Prior to the Eurovision Song Celebration YouTube broadcast in place of the semi-finals, it was revealed that Moldova was set to perform in position 4, before the entry from Austria and after the entry from San Marino.
