= Zdob și Zdub =

Moldovan folk punk band

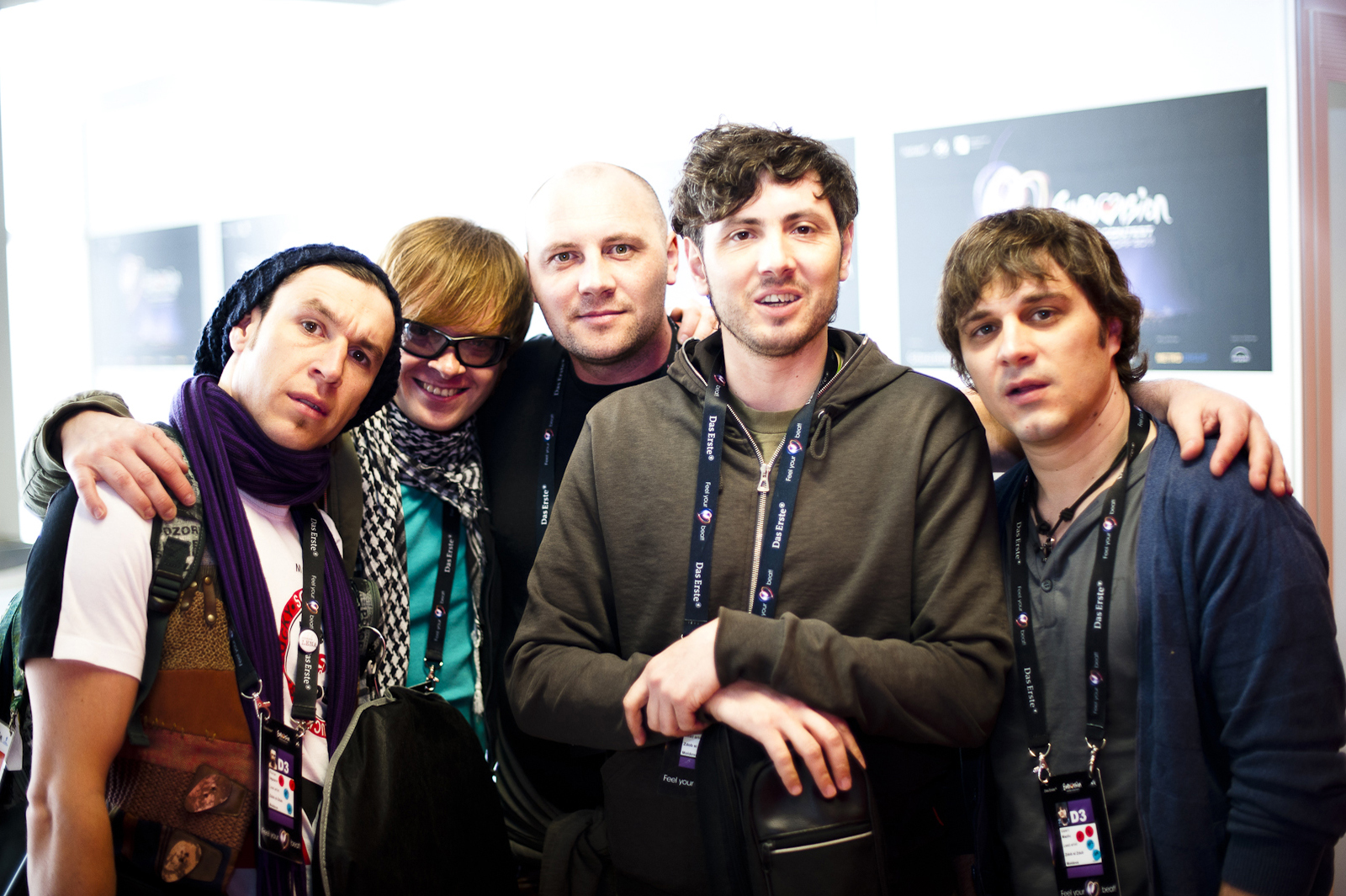
- Zdob și Zdub in 2011

Background information
- Origin: Chișinău, Moldova
- Genres: Folk punk • hardcore punk • punk rock • rapcore • folk rock
- Years active: 1994–present
- Members: Roman Iagupov, Mihai Gîncu, Sveatoslav Staruș, Andrei Cebotari, Valeriu Mazîlu, Victor Dandeș
- Past members: Anatol Pugaci, Igor Buzurniu, Alexandr Polenov, Valeriu Pugaci, Dumitru Cuharenco, Serghei Pusnina, Pezza Butnaru, Sergiu Vatavu, Ion Stavilă, Vadim Bogdan, Vitali Kocianiuc, Eugen Didic, Vadim Eremeev, Victor Cosparmac, Sergiu Cobzac, Ion Moraru
- Website: zdobsizdub.md

Zdob și Zdub (Romanian pronunciation: [ˌzdob ʃi ˈzdub]; lit. 'Zdob and Zdub', onomatopoeic for the sound of a drum beat) is a Moldovan folk punk band, based in Chișinău. The band represented Moldova in the Eurovision Song Contest 2005 in Kyiv, Ukraine, on 21 May 2005, finishing 6th. They also represented Moldova in the Eurovision Song Contest 2011 in Düsseldorf, Germany, on 14 May 2011, finishing 12th, and represented Moldova again, in the Eurovision Song Contest 2022 in Turin, Italy, on 14 May 2022, finishing 7th. The band is often referred to by its fans as ZSZ. To date, Zdob şi Zdub are the only artists to have qualified from a Eurovision Song Contest semi-final three times. Through their international success, Zdob şi Zdub has become a source of pride for young Moldovans, particularly those in the diaspora, by giving new value to their previously undervalued cultural heritage in a globalized cultural context.

Zdob şi Zdub's music challenges traditional notions of national identity by combining humor, self-irony, and a fusion of diverse cultural influences, reflecting Moldova's complex, multiethnic society in a contemporary and globally relevant way.

== Eurovision ==
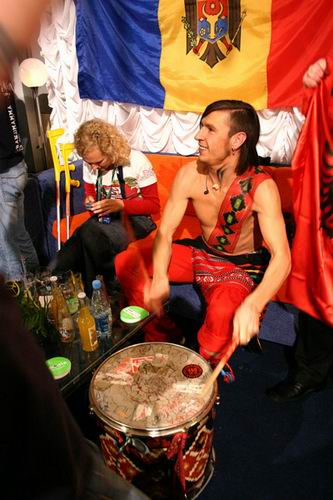
Vocalist Roman Iagupov rehearsing at the Eurovision Song Contest 2005 in Kyiv

=== 2005 ===
On 26 February 2005, the band won a national pre-selection contest to claim the right to represent Moldova in its first ever appearance at the Eurovision Song Contest 2005, with their song "Boonika Bate Toba" ("Grandmamma is beating da drum-a"). On 19 May they performed fourth in the running order of the semi-final and ended up in 2nd place with 207 points. Qualifying for the grand final on 21 May, they drew starting position 7. After voting, they claimed 6th place with 148 points.

=== 2011 ===
In February 2011, the band once again won the right to represent Moldova in the Eurovision Song Contest 2011 held in Düsseldorf. The song they performed was "So Lucky". The band performed in the second semi final on 12 May, in position 7. After voting they achieved 10th place with 54 points, qualifying them for the grand final on 14 May. They performed in the 15th position in the grand final and ended up in 12th place with 97 points at the end of voting. The song became the band's first and only to reach the UK Singles Chart, peaking at #153 on downloads alone.

=== 2022 ===
On 29 January 2022, their song "Trenulețul" was chosen by Teleradio-Moldova to represent the country at the Eurovision Song Contest 2022 in Turin after the planned national final, which the band was due to participate in with musicians Frații Advahov, was cancelled due to rising COVID-19 cases in Moldova. The group have ended up with 253 points, claiming 7th place in the Grand Final.

== Line-up ==
The following listing is by no means a comprehensive list of who has ever played in Zdob și Zdub. Early line-ups were very fluid, and many Moldovan musicians have been known to "sit in" for recording sessions or for individual concerts.

- Roman Iagupov (born 13 September 1973, Volgograd, Russia) – vocals, guitars, flute, ocarina, yorgaphone, turuiac, tartacuta, telinka, buhay, dramba, bagpipe, doba, lyricist (original member)
- Mihai Gîncu (born 5 March 1975, Străşeni, Moldova) – bass guitar, acoustic guitar, kobza, sitar, mandolin, organ, keyboards, mellotron, piano, accordion, percussion, backing vocals, composer, arranger, producer (original member)
- Sveatoslav Staruş (born 8 November 1976, Chişinău, Moldova) – guitar (1996 - 2004, 2010–present)
- Andrei Cebotari (born 4 August 1975, Soroca, Moldova) – drums (2000 - 2003, 2010–present)
- Victor Bîtca-Dandeș (born 3 April 1972, Chişinău, Moldova) – trombone, accordion, violin, kaval, flute, telinka, melodica (2001–present)
- Valeriu Mazîlu (born 12 September 1978, Chişinău, Moldova) – trumpet, bagpipe, flute (2001–present)

=== Former members ===
- Anatol Pugaci (born 6 October 1973, Chisinau, Moldova) – drums (original member; 1994–1997, February 2004 – May 2010)
- Igor Buzurniuc (born 23 June 1981, Soroca, Moldova) – guitar (January–June 2005, 2008 – May 2010)
- Serghei Vatavu (born 28 September 1967, Chisinau, Moldova) – guitar (May 2006 – 2008)
- Dimitri Kuharenco – vocals (1994–1995)
- Vitalii Kaceaniuc – drums (1998–2000)
- Serghei Cobzac – guitar (1994–1996)
- Serghei Pushnina – guitar (1996)
- Victor Cosparmac – guitar (April 2002 – December 2004)
- Vadim Bogdan – guitar (November 2005 – April 2006)
- Mihai Gincu – drums (January 2003 – January 2004)
- Pezza Butnaru – drums (January–March 2004)
- Alexandr Polenov – vocals, guitar (1991–1993)
- Valera Pugaci – flute (1991–1993)
- Vadim Eremeev – bass (January 2003 – February 2004)
- Eugen Didic – trumpet (January 1999 – September 2000)
- Ion Stavila – trumpet (September–December 2000)

== Discography ==
=== Albums ===
- Hardcore Moldovenesc (Moldovan Hardcore) (1996)
- Tabăra Noastră (Our camp) (1999)
- Remixes (2000)
- Agroromantica (2001)
- 450 De Oi (450 Sheep) (2003)
- Ethnomecanica (2006)
- Белое Вино/Красное вино (White Wine/Red Wine) (2010)
- Basta Mafia! (Stop Mafia!) (2012)
- 20 De Veri (20 Summers) (2015)
- Bestiarium (2019)

=== Singles ===
- "Bunica bate doba" (2005)
- "So Lucky" (2011)

=== Participation in compilation albums ===
- Budzma! Tuzin. Perazagruzka-2 (2011), track "Стоп-мафія"

== See also ==
- List of music released by Moldovan artists that has charted in major music markets

Awards and achievements
Preceded by none	Moldova in the Eurovision Song Contest; 2005	Succeeded by Arsenium & Natalia Gordienko feat. Connect-R with Loca
Preceded by SunStroke Project & Olia Tira with Run Away	Moldova in the Eurovision Song Contest; 2011	Succeeded by Pasha Parfeny with Lăutar
Preceded by Natalia Gordienko with Sugar	Moldova in the Eurovision Song Contest; 2022	Succeeded by Pasha Parfeny with "Soarele și luna"
