= Prison (Natalia Gordienko song) =

2020 single by Natalia Gordienko

Single by Natalia Gordienko
- Released: 30 January 2020
- Recorded: 2020
- Length: 2:57
- Label: K2ID Productions
- Songwriters: Dimitris Kontopoulos; Philipp Kirkorov; Sharon Vaughn

Natalia Gordienko singles chronology
"Arividerči" (2018)	"Prison" (2020)	"In Ochii Tai" (2020)

Music video
- "Prison" on YouTube

Eurovision Song Contest 2020 entry
- Country: Moldova
- Artist: Natalia Gordienko
- Language: English
- Composers: Dimitris Kontopoulos; Philipp Kirkorov
- Lyricists: Dimitris Kontopoulos; Sharon Vaughn

Finals performance
- Semi-final result: Contest cancelled

Entry chronology
- ◄ "Stay" (2019)
- "Sugar" (2021) ►

"Prison" is a 2020 single by Moldovan singer Natalia Gordienko. The song was originally scheduled to represent Moldova in the Eurovision Song Contest 2020 after winning Finala națională 2020, Moldova's national final. However, the contest was cancelled due to the COVID-19 pandemic.

== Background ==
In the song, Gordienko speaks of a woman who is torn by many different emotions felt by a lover she both loves and hates, making her feel like she is in a prison.

== Release ==
The song was originally released on 30 January 2020, in preparation with all other songs that were participating in the live auditions to get into Finala națională 2020. A revamped version of the song was released on 1 February 2020 just before the live auditions for the Moldavian spot for the Eurovision Song Contest 2020.

== Eurovision Song Contest ==
=== Finala națională 2020 ===
Artists and composers had the opportunity to submit their entries between 27 December 2019 and 17 January 2020. At the conclusion of the submission deadline, 35 valid entries were received by the broadcaster. The live audition round took place on 1 February 2020 at the TRM Studio in Chișinău, broadcast on Moldova 2 as well as online via trm.md and via TRM's Facebook and YouTube pages, where 20 finalists were selected to advance. "Prison" was selected as one of 20 finalists for Finala națională 2020.

The final took place on 29 February 2020. Nineteen songs competed and the winner was selected based on the combination of a public televote and the votes of an expert jury, with half of the votes coming from each vote. "Prison" would manage to win the final, earning the spot for the Moldavian entry for the Eurovision Song Contest 2020.

=== At Eurovision ===
According to Eurovision rules, all nations with the exceptions of the host country and the "Big Five" (France, Germany, Italy, Spain and the United Kingdom) are required to qualify from one of two semi-finals in order to compete for the final; the top ten countries from each semi-final progress to the final. The European Broadcasting Union (EBU) split up the competing countries into six different pots based on voting patterns from previous contests, with countries with favourable voting histories put into the same pot. On 28 January 2020, a special allocation draw was held which placed each country into one of the two semi-finals, as well as which half of the show they would perform in. Moldova was placed into the second semi-final, to be held on 14 May 2020, and was scheduled to perform in the first half of the show, performing in fourth. However, due to 2019-20 pandemic of Coronavirus, the contest was cancelled.
