= Roman Iagupov =

Moldavian singer

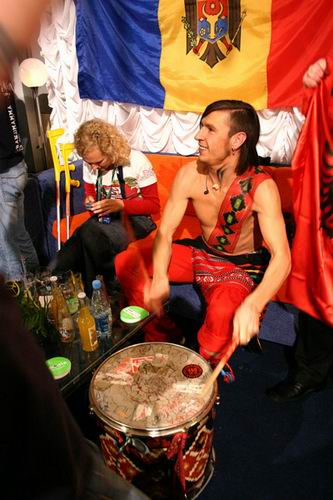
Iagupov in 2005

Roman Iagupov (Russian: Роман Юрьевич Ягупов; born 17 February, 1973) is a Russian-born Moldovan and Romanian musician, the founder and the lead singer of Zdob și Zdub.

== Biography ==
Roman Iagupov was born in Volgograd, Russia. When he was one year old, the family moved to Strășeni, Moldova, where he graduated from the Institute of Physical Education and Sports in Chișinău (1991-1995) and for one year after graduation he worked as a school teacher of physical education in Chișinău.

He founded the band Zdob și Zdub with his friends in 1994, while at the institute.

In December 2006, he got a Romanian passport. He said that he had Romanian citizenship before, but lost his documents in 1990s, so he just decided to apply for a new Romanian passport.

== Awards ==
- 20 May, 2022: Order of Honour (Moldova), "For artistic talent, originality and prodigious creative activity, for the performance at the International Song Contest "Eurovision 2022", which brought our country seventh place in the grand final, and for a substantial contribution to promoting the image of the Republic of Moldova in the world", together with Vasile Advahov and Vitalie Advahov
- 31 August 2020: People's Artist of Moldova, "for prodigious activity in the field of culture, contribution to the promotion of moral-spiritual values and high professional mastery"
- 25 May, 2005 Master of Arts of Moldova "for prodigious creative activity, successes achieved at the International Song Contest "Eurovision 2005" and contribution to promoting a favorable image of the republic abroad"
- 1 February, 2002: "Civic Merit" Medal "For successes in creative work, high interpretative mastery and prodigious concert activity", together with 5 other band members
