= Moldova in the Eurovision Song Contest 2006 =

- Eurovision Song Contest 2006
- Participating broadcaster: TeleRadio-Moldova (TRM)
- Country: Moldova
- Selection process: O melodie pentru Europa 2006
- Selection date: 25 February 2006 (first); 15 March 2006 (second)

Competing entry
- Song: "Loca"
- Artist: Arsenium feat. Natalia Gordienko and Connect-R
- Songwriters: Arsenium

Placement
- Final result: 20th, 22 points

Participation chronology

Moldova was represented at the Eurovision Song Contest 2006 with the song "Loca", written by Arsenium, and performed by Arsenium and Natalia Gordienko featuring Connect-R. The Moldovan participating broadcaster, TeleRadio-Moldova (TRM), organised the national final O melodie pentru Europa 2006 in order to select its entry for the contest. An initial 40 entries competed in the selection, with 13 being shortlisted to participate in the televised national final which took place on 25 February 2006. The combination of votes from a jury panel and a public televote resulted in a tie that was not resolved, and therefore a second final took place on 15 March 2006 with five entries participating. "Loca" performed by Arsenium and Natalia Gordienko featuring Connect-R emerged as the winner after gaining the most points following the combination of votes from the jury and public televote.

As one of the ten highest placed finishers in 2005, Moldova automatically qualified to compete in the final of the Eurovision Song Contest. Performing during the show in position 2, Moldova placed twentieth out of the 24 participating countries with 22 points.

== Background ==
Prior to the 2006 contest, TeleRadio-Moldova (TRM) had participated in the Eurovision Song Contest representing Moldova only once, in 2005, with the song "Boonika bate doba" performed by Zdob și Zdub qualifying to the final and placing sixth. As part of its duties as participating broadcaster, TRM organises the selection of its entry in the Eurovision Song Contest and broadcasts the event in the country. The broadcaster confirmed its intentions to participate at the 2006 contest on 6 January 2006. TRM had selected its entry via a national selection show in 2005, a procedure that was continued for its 2006 participation.

== Before Eurovision ==
=== O melodie pentru Europa 2006 ===
O melodie pentru Europa 2006 was the national final format developed by TRM in order to select its entry for the Eurovision Song Contest 2006. The event was to include a semi-final and a final to be held on 5 and 25 February 2006, respectively. However, a second final was held on 15 March 2006 after the first final ended without selecting a winner. All shows in the competition were broadcast on Moldova 1 and Radio Moldova as well as online via TRM's official website trm.md.

==== Format ====
The selection of the competing entries took place over three rounds. The first round occurred on 30 January 2006 where a jury panel selected 25 semi-finalists from the received submissions to proceed to the second round, the televised national final. 25 semi-finalists competed in the semi-final on 5 February 2006. Thirteen songs qualified to the final based on the votes from an expert jury. The thirteen qualifying entries competed in the final on 25 February 2006 where the winner was selected based on the combined votes from an expert jury and public televoting results. In the event of a tie, the tie was resolved by an additional expert jury vote. Failing that, the entry that receives the vote from the youngest member of the jury would have been declared the winner. Since the jury was unable to select a winner following both tie-breaks, a second final took place on 15 March 2006 where five entries competed. The winner was selected by the 50/50 combination of an expert jury vote and a public televote. In the event of a tie, the tie would have been resolved by the youngest jury member's vote. Failing that, the entry that receives the highest score from the public televote would have been declared the winner.

==== Competing entries ====
Artists and composers had the opportunity to submit their entries between 6 January 2006 and 27 January 2006. At the conclusion of the submission deadline, 40 valid entries out of 42 were received by the broadcaster; "Lumea dansează" performed by Gheorghe Olărescu was disqualified, while "Nu-mi jură" performed by Stela Mitriuc was withdrawn from the competition. A seven-member jury selected 25 semi-finalists out of the 40 received entries, which were announced on 31 January 2006.

==== Semi-final ====
The semi-final took place on 5 February 2006 at TRM Studio 2 in Chișinău and aired on 8 February 2006. In the semi-final twenty-five acts competed and thirteen songs qualified to the final based on the votes of an expert jury.

Semi-final – 5 February 2006
Artist	Song	Points	Place
Aura	"Se întoarce calendarul"	57	10
Cezara	"Badisor"	56	11
Corina Țepeș	"N-am să vin"	59	8
Edict	"Love Is Never Wrong"	56	11
Escape	"De ce tăcerea am ales"	40	25
Eugeniu Doibani	"Prayer for Peace"	52	14
Georgeta Daraban	"I Believe"	68	4
Geta Burlacu	"Zii lăută"	72	2
Illyhan	"Ben seviyorum"	51	17
Kristina Rujitkaia	"Somebody"	52	14
Lina	"Everytime I See You"	58	9
Lou	"My Love Is True"	63	7
Marina Chirtoacă	"All Alone"	46	21
Maxim	"Singur în noapte"	45	23
Millenium	"Cred în steaua mea"	70	3
Moldstar and Alexa	"Sing Your Song"	64	6
Muzica-1	"Spiritul lui Ștefan cel Mare"	48	20
Nadejda Cara	"I Have to Find You"	50	18
Olia Tira	"Iubirea mea"	67	5
Ruxanda Calistru	"Fata cu ochii de foc"	50	18
Serj Kuzenkoff	"Made in Moldova"	77	1
Studio One	"Soarele și dimineața"	55	13
Valeriu Motovilnic	"Aprinde iubirea"	46	21
Victoria Lungu and Costi Burlacu	"E prea târziu"	45	23
Vlad	"For You, pentru tine"	52	14

==== First final ====
The final took place on 25 February 2006 at the Theatre of Opera and Ballet in Chișinău. Thirteen songs competed and the winner was selected based on the combination of a public televote and the votes of an expert jury. The jury that voted in the final included Mihai Dolgan (composer), Lidia Panfil (producer), Oleg Baraliuc (composer), Pavel Goia (musician), Angela Sârbu (representative of the magazine Aquarelle), Irina Moghiliova (representative of the magazine Fiesta), Nicolae Grehov (representative of the "Mavr & Company" Record House) and Gheorghe Mustea (composer). In addition to the performances of the competing entries, Zdob și Zdub (who represented Moldova in 2005) performed as a guest.

At the conclusion of the voting, Geta Burlacu, Moldstar and Alexa, and Serj Kuzenkoff were tied at 18 points each. The tie was to be resolved with each member of the expert jury casting one vote for one of the three songs, which ended up with another tie as two of the entries received 4 votes each. The youngest jury member subsequently abstained from voting and therefore the final ended without a winner.

First final – 25 February 2006
R/O	Artist	Song	Jury		Televote		Total	Place
R/O	Artist	Song	Votes	Points	Votes	Points	Total	Place
1	Edict	"Love Is Never Wrong"	52	0	174	0	0	11
2	Lina	"Everytime I See You"	56	4	1,297	8	12	5
3	Studio One	"Soarele și dimineața"	50	0	283	0	0	11
4	Millenium	"Cred în steaua mea"	71	10	1,075	7	17	4
5	Cezara	"Badisor"	64	7	562	4	11	6
6	Moldstar and Alexa	"Sing Your Song"	67	8	1,302	10	18	1
7	Lou	"My Love Is True"	57	5	596	3	8	7
8	Serj Kuzenkoff	"Made in Moldova"	63	6	2,702	12	18	1
9	Aura	"Se întoarce calendarul"	56	3	505	2	5	9
10	Olia Tira	"Iubirea mea"	56	2	573	5	7	8
11	Georgeta Daraban	"I Believe"	54	1	487	1	2	10
12	Corina Țepeș	"N-am să vin"	51	0	196	0	0	11
13	Geta Burlacu	"Zii lăută"	72	12	835	6	18	1

Detailed Jury Votes
R/O	Song	Juror								Total
R/O	Song	1	2	3	4	5	6	7	8	Total
1	"Love Is Never Wrong"	6	6	8	6	6	8	6	6	52
2	"Everytime I See You"	8	8	5	7	7	7	7	7	56
3	"Soarele și dimineața"	5	5	6	6	6	7	9	6	50
4	"Cred în steaua mea"	9	8	7	10	9	10	9	9	71
5	"Badisor"	9	9	6	8	8	8	8	8	64
6	"Sing Your Song"	8	6	9	8	10	9	8	9	67
7	"My Love Is True"	6	9	8	6	6	8	7	7	57
8	"Made in Moldova"	8	10	7	9	6	8	7	8	63
9	"Se întoarce calendarul"	7	8	5	7	7	7	7	8	56
10	"Iubirea mea"	7	7	8	7	8	8	6	5	56
11	"I Believe"	4	8	7	8	8	8	6	5	54
12	"N-am să vin"	6	5	8	8	7	7	5	5	51
13	"Zii lăută"	10	9	10	9	9	9	7	9	72

==== Second final ====
On 8 March 2006, TRM announced the organisation of a second final; the rules of the competition stated that the broadcaster possessed the right to nullify the results of the selection and choose an alternative entry if they felt the overall standard was not good enough for the Eurovision Song Contest. Artists and composers had the opportunity to submit their entries until 14 March 2006, and the three artists tied for the first place in the first final were also invited by the broadcaster to compete with their initial songs; only Serj Kuzenkoff accepted the invitation. At the conclusion of the submission deadline, 8 valid entries were received by the broadcaster. A jury selected four out of the eight received entries to advance to the second final which took place on 15 March 2006 at the TRM Studio in Chișinău, hosted by Rusalina Rusu and Bogdan Dascal. The winner was selected based on the combination of a public televote and the votes of an expert jury. "Loca" performed by Arsenium featuring Natalia Gordienko and Connect-R was selected as the winner.

Second final – 15 March 2006
R/O	Artist	Song	Jury		Televote		Total	Place
R/O	Artist	Song	Votes	Points	Votes	Points	Total	Place
1	Ludmila Znamenskaia	"Something About Love"	50	7	503	7	14	4
2	Svetlana Sertzova and Vadim Luchin	"The Games of Night"	45	6	130	6	12	5
3	Serj Kuzenkoff	"Made in Moldova"	70	10	3,739	10	20	2
4	Arsenium and Natalia Gordienko feat. Connect-R	"Loca"	74	12	6,818	12	24	1
5	Marcella	"I've Never Thought"	68	8	680	8	16	3

Detailed Jury Votes
R/O	Song	Juror								Total
R/O	Song	1	2	3	4	5	6	7	8	Total
1	"Something About Love"	7	6	7	3	5	7	7	8	50
2	"The Games of Night"	6	2	8	4	4	8	6	7	45
3	"Made in Moldova"	8	9	10	7	8	9	10	9	70
4	"Loca"	8	8	10	10	10	9	9	10	74
5	"I've Never Thought"	7	8	9	10	10	8	8	8	68

=== Controversy ===
Following the 25 February final, producer of Moldstar and Alexa, Marian Stîrcea, criticised TRM of not complying to the regulations as it was decided to hold a second final instead of having the jury select from one of the three songs tied for first place as stated in the competition rules. On 2 March, producer of Millenium Vlad Gorgos presented a petition to the Government of Moldova in protest of the violation of rules as signed by 13 of the national final participants, whilst requesting a repeat of the first final with different jury members. Both had also accused the broadcaster of setting up Arsenium's eventual victory with Stîrcea calling for him to withdraw "in order to keep its name", and had claimed several violations in regards to the jury and televoting procedure that connected to rigging. TRM responded by clarifying that the all procedures were carried out correctly, and that the reason why no exact winner was announced during the first final was due to the failure of the jury tie-break procedure that led to a delay in the event's planned broadcasting time slot.

== At Eurovision ==
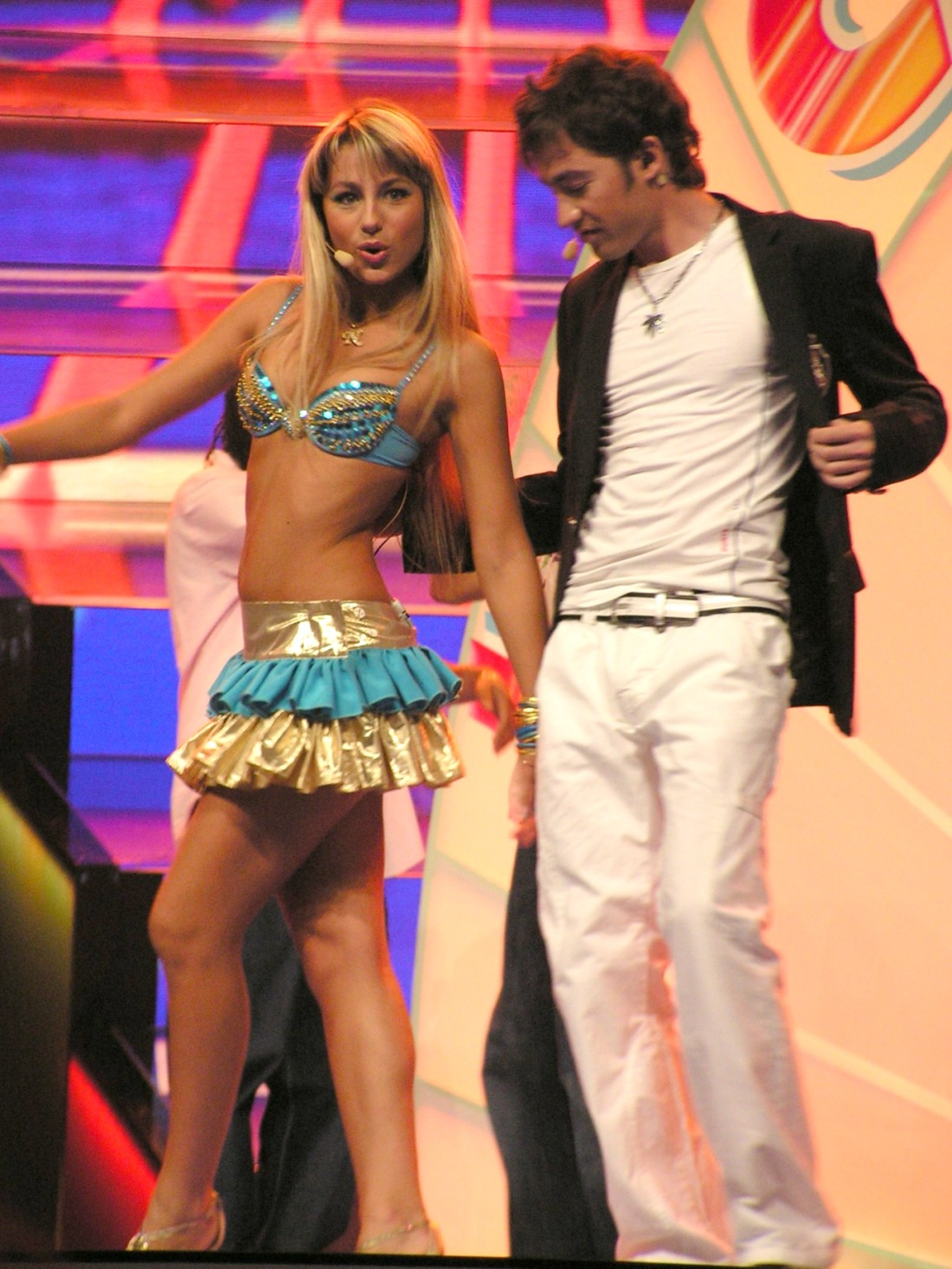
Arsenium and Natalia Gordienko during a rehearsal

According to Eurovision rules, all nations with the exceptions of the host country, the "Big Four" (France, Germany, Spain and the United Kingdom) and the ten highest placed finishers in the 2005 contest are required to qualify from the semi-final in order to compete for the final; the top ten countries from the semi-final progress to the final. As one of the ten highest placed finishers in the 2005 contest, Moldova automatically qualified to compete in the final on 20 May 2006. In addition to their participation in the final, Moldova is also required to broadcast and vote in the semi-final on 18 May 2006. On 21 March 2006, a special allocation draw was held which determined the running order and Moldova was set to perform in position 4 during the final, following the entry from Switzerland and before the entry from Israel. Moldova placed twentieth in the final, scoring 22 points. Following the contest, "Loca" gained success in Romania with the song reaching number four on the Romanian Top 100 in August 2006.

The two shows were televised in Moldova on Moldova 1 and broadcast via radio on Radio Moldova. All broadcasts featured commentary by Vitalie Rotaru. TRM appointed Svetlana Cocoş as its spokesperson to announce the Moldovan votes during the final.

=== Voting ===
Below is a breakdown of points awarded to Moldova and awarded by Moldova in the semi-final and grand final of the contest. The nation awarded its 12 points to Russia in the semi-final and to Romania in the final of the contest.

==== Points awarded to Moldova ====
Points awarded to Moldova (Final)
Score	Country
12 points	Romania
10 points	
8 points	
7 points	
6 points	
5 points	
4 points	
3 points	Portugal; Russia
2 points	Spain
1 point	Greece; Turkey

==== Points awarded by Moldova ====
Points awarded by Moldova (Semi-final)
Score	Country
12 points	Russia
10 points	Ukraine
8 points	Bosnia and Herzegovina
7 points	Sweden
6 points	Lithuania
5 points	Finland
4 points	Poland
3 points	Belarus
2 points	Armenia
1 point	Ireland

Points awarded by Moldova (Final)
Score	Country
12 points	Romania
10 points	Russia
8 points	Ukraine
7 points	Armenia
6 points	Finland
5 points	Bosnia and Herzegovina
4 points	Lithuania
3 points	Norway
2 points	Sweden
1 point	Greece
