= Natalia Gordienko =

Moldovan singer and dancer (born 1987)

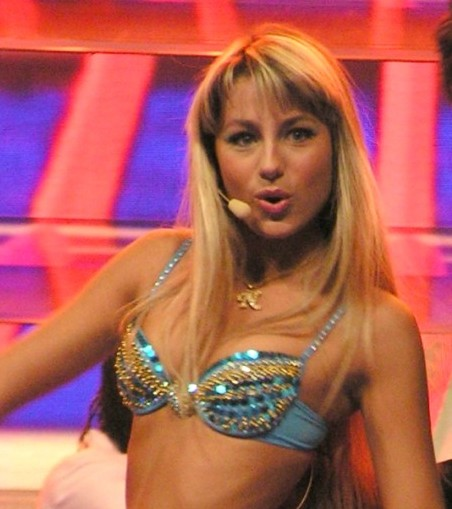
- Gordienko in 2006

Background information
- Also known as: Natalia Gordienco; DJ Tasha; Natalie Toma; Natașa Rostova
- Born: 11 December 1987 (age 38); Chișinău, Moldavian SSR, Soviet Union
- Genre: Pop
- Occupations: Singer; dancer
- Years active: 2005–present

Natalia Gordienko (also spelled Gordienco; Ukrainian: Наталія Гордієнко; born 11 December 1987) is a Moldovan singer and dancer.

Alongside Arsenium and Connect-R, she represented Moldova in the Eurovision Song Contest 2006 with the song "Loca" and placed 20th. She was selected to represent Moldova in the Eurovision Song Contest 2020 with the song "Prison"; however, the 2020 contest was cancelled due to the COVID-19 pandemic. Instead, she represented Moldova in the Eurovision Song Contest 2021 with the song "Sugar" and placed 13th with 115 points.

== Life and career ==
=== Early life ===
Gordienko was born in Chișinău on 11 December 1987. She is of Ukrainian descent. Gordienko sang in her school choir, studied piano at music school, and danced in her school's dance ensemble for ten years. At the age of 15, she began participating in song competitions.

=== Music career and Eurovision ===
In 2005, Gordienko became the singer of the band Millennium. In 2005, in the national selection for the Calea Victoriei, Millennium came third. Millennium was invited to participate in the Golden Stag international competition in Romania in 2005.

On 20 May 2006, she represented Moldova alongside Arsenium and Connect-R with the song "Loca" at the Eurovision Song Contest 2006. The song placed 20th in the field of 24 and scored 22 points.

In 2009 Gordienko started a project called DJ Star, in which she tried herself as a DJ; she won the prize despite having no prior experience as a DJ.

In 2010, Gordienko released her first album Time and in 2011 the album Cununa de flori. However neither album was released for purchase digitally or physically. The only release it received was on Gordienko’s SoundCloud account.

In 2015, Gordienko signed her new single "Summertime" with Fly Records, the label of Tudor and Dan from Fly Project.

In 2008, Gordienko received honorary title of ″Emeritus Artist″ of Moldova.

She was to represent Moldova in the Eurovision Song Contest 2020 held in Rotterdam, Netherlands with the song "Prison". This would have been her second time in the contest and the first time as a solo singer, however, the 2020 contest was cancelled due to the COVID-19 pandemic. She was again selected as the Moldovan representative for the 2021 contest where she finished in 13th place with 115 points with the song “Sugar”. Her 17 second note at the end of "Sugar" was reported to be the longest note in Eurovision history.

== Competitions ==
Gordienko has taken part in many competitions and has won many awards:

- National competition - The song on the national station Radio Moldova in 2003 - 2nd place
- National competition – The Star Of Kishinev in 2003 - grand prize
- National competition – Miss Teenager in 2004 - grand prize
- International Festival – Rainbow Stars in Jūrmala, Latvia in 2003
- International competition – Sevastopol-Ialta in Ukraine in 2004 - 1st place
- International competition – Delfice Games in 2004 - 1st place
- International competition – Heart Of Two Twins in 2004 - 1st place
- International competition – Songs Of The World in 2005 - 1st place
- International competition – Our Native Edge in 2005 - grand prize
- International competition - Eurovision Song Contest in 2006 - 20th place
- International competition - Slavianski Bazaar in 2006 - grand prize
- International competition - New Wave in 2007 - 1st place
- International competition - World Championship of performing arts in 2008 - golden medal for voice

== Discography ==
=== Singles ===
==== As lead artist ====
Title	Year	Peak chart positions						Album
Title	Year	MDA Air.	CIS Air.	LTU	NLD	RUS Air.	SWE	Album
"Dar-ar naiba dragoste in tine"	2012	*	—	—	—	—	—	Non-album singles
"Summertime"	2015	*	—	—	—	—	—	Non-album singles
"Habibi" (featuring Mohombi)	2016	*	—	—	—	—	—	Non-album singles
"Blizko" (featuring Irakli)	2016	*	—	—	—	—	—	Non-album singles
"P'yanaya"	2017	195	—	—	—	—	—	Non-album singles
"Cheia"	2017	*	—	—	—	—	—	Non-album singles
"Dus cu apa rece"	2018	*	—	—	—	—	—	Non-album singles
"Arividerči"	2018	*	—	—	—	—	—	Non-album singles
"Prison"	2020	*	—	—	—	—	—	Non-album singles
"In ochii tai"	2020	*	—	—	—	—	—	Non-album singles
"Sugar"	2021	*	—	49	— (Note: "Sugar" did not enter the Dutch Single Top 100, but peaked at number 10 on the Single Tip chart.)	—	— (Note: "Sugar" did not enter the Swedish Top 100 Singles Chart, but peaked at number 4 on the Sweden Heatseeker Songs.)	Non-album singles
"Tuz bubi"	2021	*	138	—	—	85	—	Non-album singles
"High Heels"	2021	*	—	—	—	—	—	Non-album singles
"Ya schastlivaya"	2022	148	64	—	—	43	—	Non-album singles
"Lyubimy"	2022	36	76	—	—	45	—	Non-album singles
"Na sinikh ozorakh"	2023	25	62	—	—	44	—	Non-album singles
"Razgovory" (featuring Yuliya Kovalchuk and Anna Khilkevich)	2024	138	—	—	—	—	—	Non-album singles
"Telefonnyy zvonok"	2024	13	82	—	—	45	—	Non-album singles
"Minte-mă" (featuring Jorge)	2024	18	—	—	—	—	—	Non-album singles
"Salty Caramel"	2025	—	—	—	—	—	—	Non-album singles
"Noi doi"	2025	—	—	—	—	—	—	Non-album singles
"Du-mǎ dorule" (with Kesu Key)	2026	—	—	—	—	—	—	Non-album singles
"Pishu pis'mo dushi"	2026	30	53	—	—	42	—	Non-album singles
"—" denotes items which were not released in that country or failed to chart. "*" denotes that the chart did not exist at that time.

==== As featured artist ====
Title	Year	Peak chart positions	Album
Title	Year	UKR Air.	Album
"Loca" (Arsenium featuring Natalia Gordienko and Connect-R)	2006	16	Non-album single

== Notes ==
Awards and achievements
Preceded by Zdob şi Zdub with Boonika bate doba	Moldova in the Eurovision Song Contest (with Arsenium and Connect-R); 2006	Succeeded by Natalia Barbu with Fight
Preceded by Anna Odobescu with Stay	Moldova in the Eurovision Song Contest; 2020 (cancelled)	Succeeded by Herself with Sugar
Preceded by Herself with Prison	Moldova in the Eurovision Song Contest; 2021	Succeeded by Zdob şi Zdub and Advahov Brothers with Trenulețul
