= Moldova in the Eurovision Song Contest =

- Eurovision Song Contest
- Participating broadcaster: Teleradio-Moldova (TRM)

Participation summary
- Appearances: 20 (14 finals)
- First appearance: 2005
- Highest placement: 3rd: 2017
- Participation history: 2005; 2006; 2007; 2008; 2009; 2010; 2011; 2012; 2013; 2014; 2015; 2016; 2017; 2018; 2019; ~~2020~~; 2021; 2022; 2023; 2024; ~~2025~~; 2026

External links
- TRM page
- Moldova's page at Eurovision.com
- For the most recent participation see Moldova in the Eurovision Song Contest 2026

Moldova has been represented at the Eurovision Song Contest 20 times since its debut in 2005, missing only the 2025 contest to date. The Moldovan participating broadcaster in the contest is Teleradio-Moldova (TRM). Its best result is a third‑place finish, achieved with "Hey Mamma" by SunStroke Project in 2017.

Moldova's debut at the 2005 contest was successful, with "Boonika bate doba" by Zdob și Zdub finishing sixth. The country has also reached the top ten with "Fight" by Natalia Barbu (2007), "My Lucky Day" by DoReDoS (2018), "Trenulețul" by Zdob și Zdub and the Advahov Brothers (2022) and “Viva, Moldova!” by Satoshi (2026). Moldova has reached the final on twelve occasions, failing to qualify from the semi‑finals in 2008, 2014, 2015, 2016, 2019 and 2024. Although initially confirming its participation in the 2025 contest, TRM later withdrew, citing economic and artistic challenges. The country returned to Eurovision in 2026.

== Participation ==
Teleradio-Moldova (TRM) is a full member of the European Broadcasting Union (EBU), thus eligible to participate in the Eurovision Song Contest. It has participated in the contest representing Moldova since its 50th edition in 2005. TRM had previously planned to debut at the Eurovision Song Contest in 1996, but the planned entry failed to materialize.

== History ==
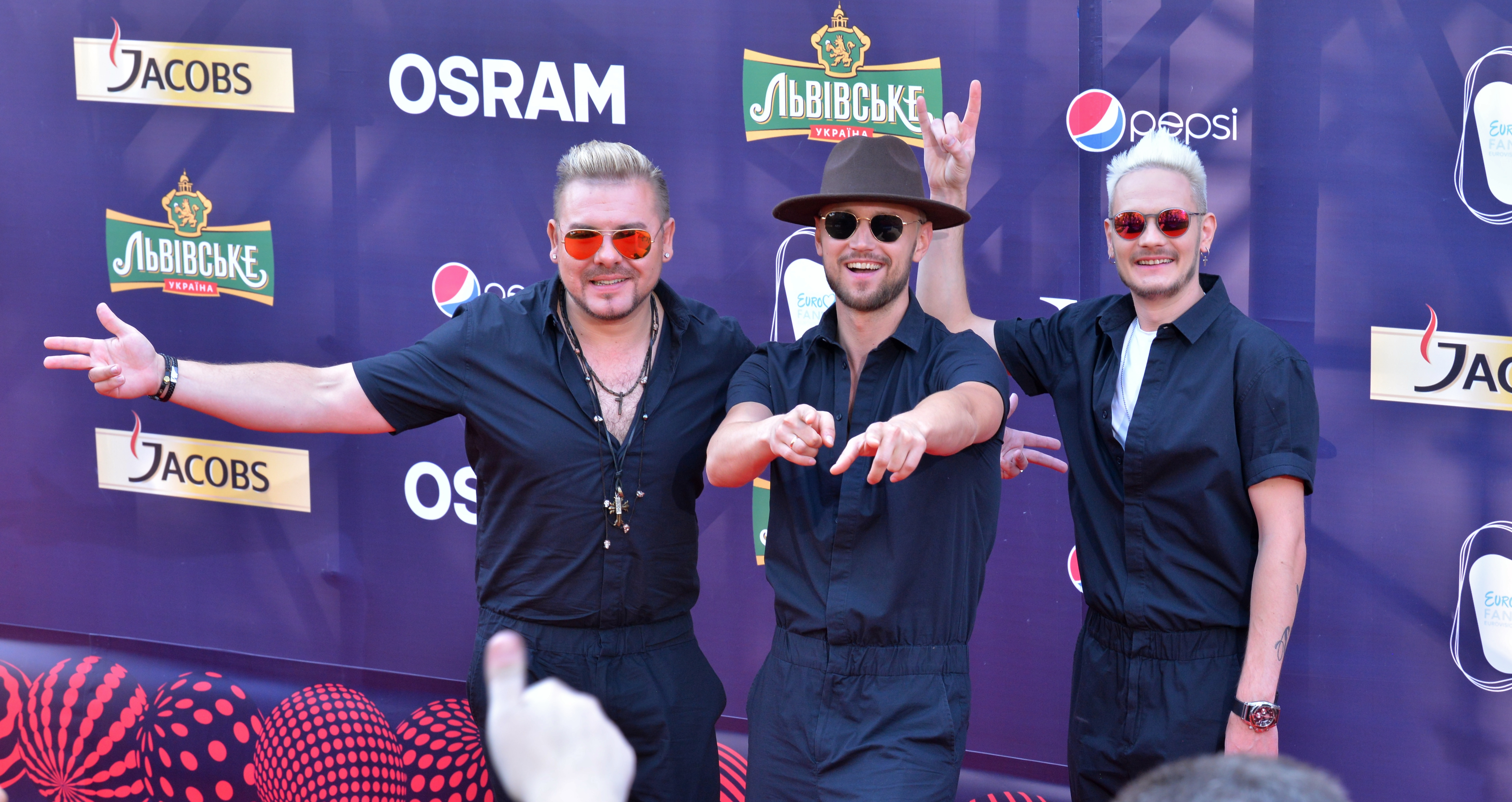
SunStroke Project (pictured) placed third with their 2017 entry "Hey Mamma".

Following Moldova's 20th-place finish in the 2006 contest, TRM announced that it would not participate in 2007, and did not allocate a budget for the 2007 Contest. However, in response to public pressure, TRM filed the preliminary documents to compete and sent Natalia Barbu with song "Fight". She achieved 10th place.

In 2008, Moldova, for the first time in its four years of participation, failed to make the final. "A Century of Love", performed by Geta Burlacu, finished in 12th place in the semi-final. In 2009, Moldova achieved 14th place with Nelly Ciobanu. In 2010, saxophonist Sergey Stepanov of SunStroke Project became the internet phenomenon ("Epic Sax Guy") with his 30-second saxophone solo.

In 2011, Zdob și Zdub represented Moldova for a second time in the contest, with the song "So Lucky" placing 12th in the final. In 2012 and 2013, Moldova achieved 11th place with Pasha Parfeny and Aliona Moon, respectively.

From 2014 to 2016, Moldova failed to qualify for the final. The country finished in last position in the 2014 semi-final, 11th in the 2015 semi-final, and pre-last in the 2016 semi-final. In 2017, Moldova achieved its best result at the contest, when SunStroke Project finished third in the final with the song "Hey, Mamma!". The streak of top 10 results continued in 2018 with the band DoReDos finishing 10th in Lisbon. However, in 2019, Moldova failed to qualify for the first time since 2016, finishing 12th in the semi-final.

In 2020, Natalia Gordienko, who previously represented Moldova in the Eurovision Song Contest 2006, was chosen to represent the country with the song "Prison", though the contest was cancelled due to the COVID-19 pandemic. Gordienko was then internally selected to represent Moldova in 2021 with the song "Sugar". She eventually qualified to the grand final and placed in 13th position with 115 points. Her 17-second note at the end of "Sugar" was reported to be the longest note in Eurovision history. For the 2022 contest in Turin, Zdob și Zdub, who previously represented the country in 2005 and 2011, and the Advahov Brothers were selected exclusively after a live audition round held by the broadcaster. Performing "Trenulețul", the act eventually qualified for the final and ultimately placed seventh with 253 points. The group finished second in the public televote in the final, Moldova's highest placing in the televote to date. This marked the country's best result since 2005 and its third-highest placing to date. This was followed in 2023 by an eighteenth-place finish with "Soarele și luna", performed by Pasha Parfeni, who previously represented Moldova in the Eurovision Song Contest 2012. In 2024, Moldova failed to qualify for the first time in five years, with Natalia Barbu, who previously represented Moldova in the Eurovision Song Contest 2007, finishing in thirteenth place in the semi-final with "In the Middle".

On 16 November 2024, TRM confirmed its intention to participate in the 2025 contest, holding a live audition round for its national final with 26 entries on 18 January 2025. However, on 22 January, TRM announced its withdrawal from the contest due to economic reasons and concerns about the quality of its national final; it was the first time since the country's debut in 2005 that they were absent. The broadcaster did not rule out a future return to the contest, stating that it would "review the criteria and methodology for selecting the country's representative for the international stage".

On 3 November 2025, TRM announced that the country would return to the contest in 2026. Satoshi represented Moldova at the 2026 contest with the song, “Viva, Moldova!”, qualifying for the final, where he achieved the eighth place with 226 points.

== Participation overview ==
Table key
2	Second place
3	Third place
◁	Last place
◇	Entry selected but did not compete
†	Upcoming event

Year	Artist	Song	Language	Final	Points	Semi	Points
2005	Zdob și Zdub	"Boonika bate doba"	English, Romanian	6	148	2	207
2006	Arsenium feat. Natalia Gordienko and Connect-R	"Loca"	English	20	22	Top 11 in 2005 final (Note: According to the then-Eurovision rules, the top ten non-Big Four countries from the previous year along with the Big Four automatically qualified for the Grand Final without having to compete in semi-finals. For example, if Germany and France placed inside the top ten, the 11th and 12th spots were advanced to next year's Grand Final along with all countries ranked in the top ten.)	
2007	Natalia Barbu	"Fight"	English	10	109	10	91
2008	Geta Burlacu	"A Century of Love"	English	Failed to qualify		12	36
2009	Nelly Ciobanu	"Hora din Moldova"	Romanian, English	14	69	5	106
2010	SunStroke Project and Olia Tira	"Run Away"	English	22	27	10	52
2011	Zdob și Zdub	"So Lucky"	English	12	97	10	54
2012	Pasha Parfeni	"Lăutar"	English	11	81	5	100
2013	Aliona Moon	"O mie"	Romanian	11	71	4	95
2014	Cristina Scarlat	"Wild Soul"	English	Failed to qualify		16 ◁	13
2015	Eduard Romanyuta	"I Want Your Love"	English	Failed to qualify		11	41
2016	Lidia Isac	"Falling Stars"	English	Failed to qualify		17	33
2017	SunStroke Project	"Hey Mamma"	English	3	374	2	291
2018	DoReDoS	"My Lucky Day"	English	10	209	3	235
2019	Anna Odobescu	"Stay"	English	Failed to qualify		12	85
2020	Natalia Gordienko ◇	"Prison" ◇	English ◇	Contest cancelled (Note: The 2020 contest was cancelled due to the COVID-19 pandemic.)			
2021	Natalia Gordienko	"Sugar"	English	13	115	7	179
2022	Zdob și Zdub and Advahov Brothers	"Trenulețul"	Romanian	7	253	8	154
2023	Pasha Parfeni	"Soarele și luna"	Romanian	18	96	5	109
2024	Natalia Barbu	"In the Middle"	English	Failed to qualify		13	20
2026	Satoshi	"Viva, Moldova!"	Romanian	8	226	4	208
2027	Confirmed intention to participate †						

=== Heads of delegation ===
Year	Head of delegation	Ref.
2008–2011	Vitalie Cojocaru	
2013	Vitalie Cojocaru	
2015	Vitalie Cojocaru	
2018–2022	Vitalie Cojocaru	
2023–2024	Daria Capațîna	
~~2025~~	~~Daniela Crudu~~	
2026	Veronica Cojocaru	
2027	Vitalie Cojocaru	

== Commentators and spokespersons ==
For the show's broadcast on TRM, various commentators provided commentary on the contest in Romanian. After all the votes are tallied at the Eurovision Song Contest, the hosts invite a spokesperson from each voting country to announce their results on screen.

Year	Television		Radio		Spokesperson	Ref.
Year	Commentator	Channel	Commentator	Channel	Spokesperson	Ref.
2005	Vitalie Rotaru	Moldova 1	Vitalie Rotaru	Radio Moldova	Elena Camerzan	
2006	Vitalie Rotaru	Moldova 1	Vitalie Rotaru	Radio Moldova	Svetlana Cocoș	
2007	Vitalie Rotaru	Moldova 1	Vitalie Rotaru	Radio Moldova	Andrei Porubin	
2008	Lucia Danu and Vitalie Rotaru	Moldova 1, TV Moldova Internațional	No broadcast		Vitalie Rotaru	
2009	Rosalina Rusu and Andrei Sava	Moldova 1, TV Moldova Internațional	No broadcast		Sandu Leancă	
2010	Marcel Spatari	Moldova 1, TV Moldova Internațional	No broadcast		Tania Cerga	
2011	Marcel Spatari	Moldova 1, TV Moldova Internațional	Marcel Spatari	Radio Moldova	Geta Burlacu	
2012	Marcel Spatari	Moldova 1	Marcel Spatari	Radio Moldova	Olivia Furtună	
2013	Lidia Scarlat	Moldova 1	Lidia Scarlat	Radio Moldova	Olivia Furtună	
2014	Daniela Babici	Moldova 1	Daniela Babici	Radio Moldova	Olivia Furtună	
2015	Daniela Babici	Moldova 1	Daniela Babici	Radio Moldova, Radio Moldova Muzical, Radio Moldova Tineret	Olivia Furtună	
2016	Gloria Gorceag	Moldova 1	Gloria Gorceag	Radio Moldova, Radio Moldova Muzical, Radio Moldova Tineret	Olivia Furtună	
2017	Galina Timuș	Moldova 1	Cristina Galbici (Radio Moldova); Cătălin Ungureanu and Maria-Mihaela; Frimu (Radio Moldova Tineret)	Radio Moldova, Radio Moldova Tineret	Gloria Gorceag	
2018	Djulieta Ardovan	Moldova 1	Djulieta Ardovan	Radio Moldova	Djulieta Ardovan	
2019	Doina Stimpovschi and Daniela Crudu	Moldova 1	Doina Stimpovschi and Daniela Crudu	Radio Moldova	Doina Stimpovschi	
2021	Doina Stimpovschi	Moldova 1	Doina Stimpovschi	Radio Moldova	Sergey Stepanov	
2022	Ion Jalbă and Daniela Crudu	Moldova 1	Ion Jalbă and Daniela Crudu	Radio Moldova	Elena Bancila	
2023	Ion Jalbă and Daniela Crudu	Moldova 1	Ion Jalbă and Daniela Crudu	Radio Moldova, Radio Moldova Muzical	Doina Stimpovschi	
2024	Ion Jalbă and Elena Stegari	Moldova 1	Angela Rudenco	Radio Moldova	Doina Stimpovschi	
2025	Ion Jalbă and Daniela Crudu	Moldova 1	No broadcast		Did not participate	
2026	Elena Stegari and Radu Canțîr	Moldova 1	Elena Stegari and Radu Canțîr	Radio Moldova, Radio Moldova Muzical	Margarita Druță	

== Photo gallery ==
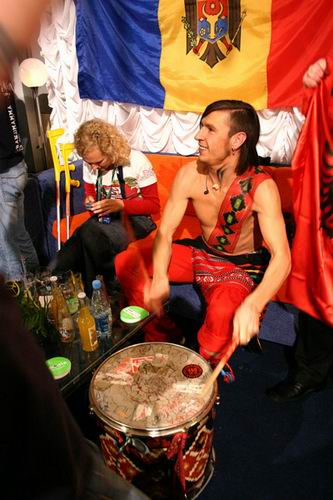
Zdob și Zdub in Kyiv (2005)

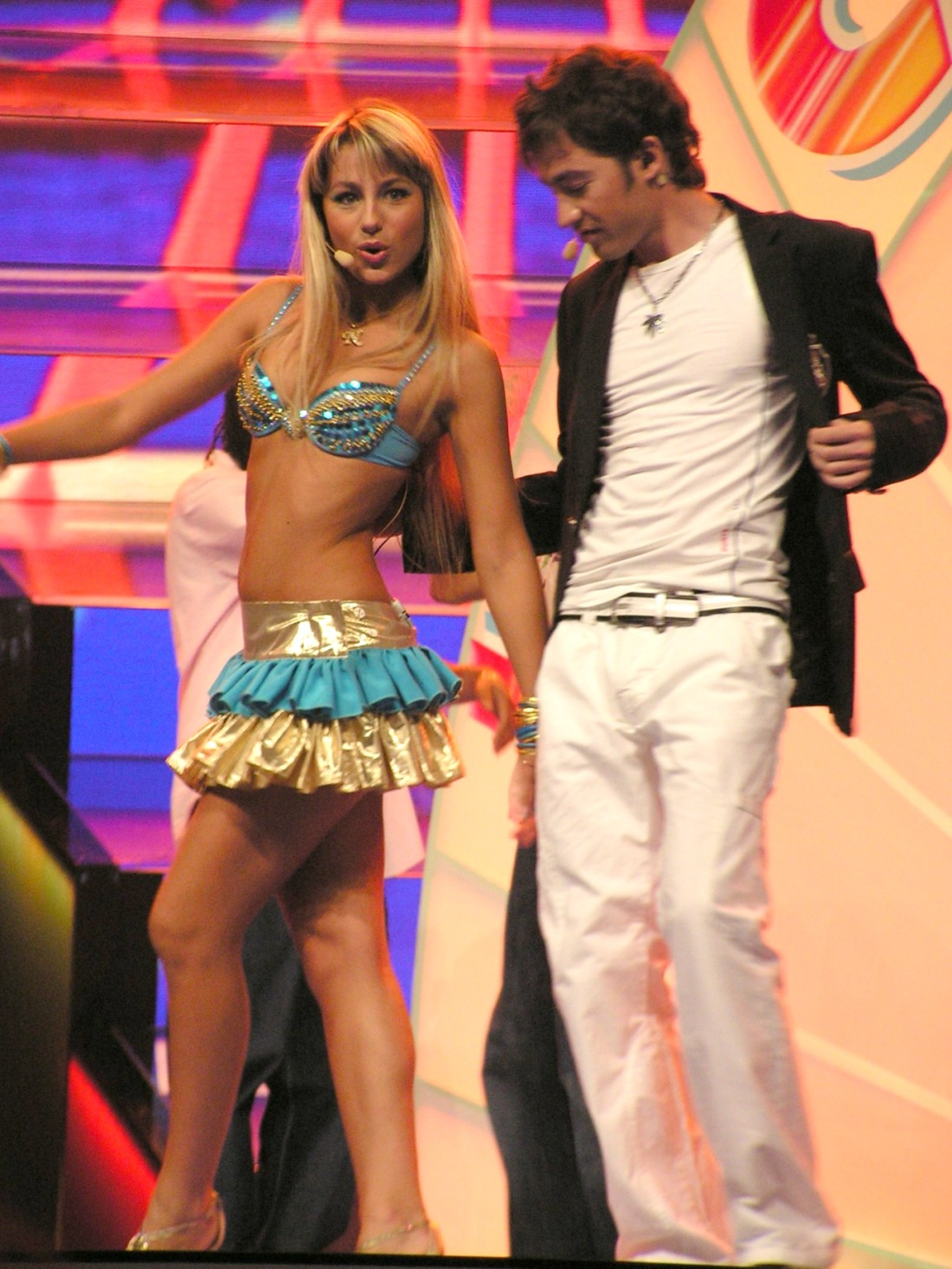
Natalia Gordienko and Arsenium performing "Loca" in Athens (2006)

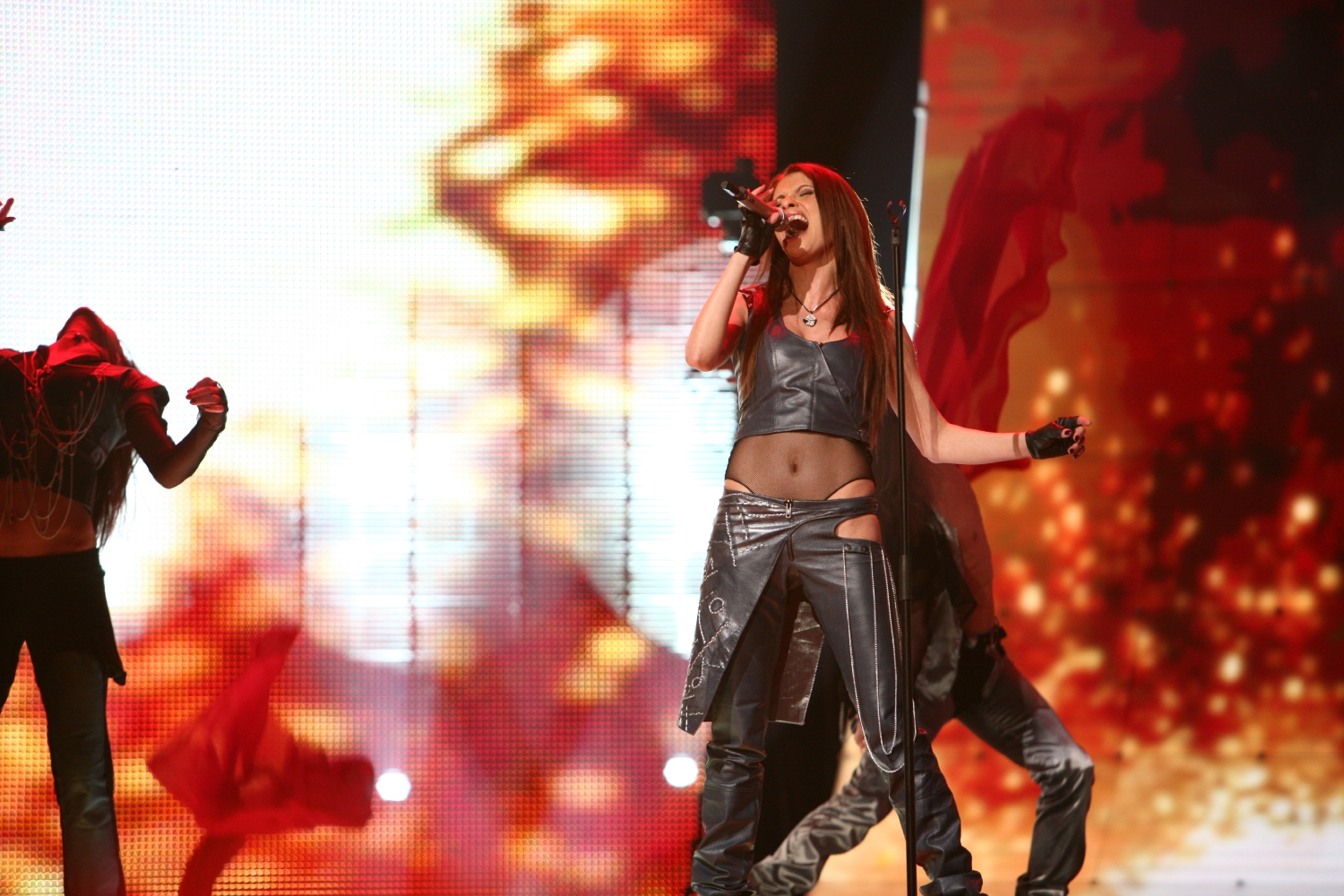
Natalia Barbu performing "Fight" in Helsinki (2007)

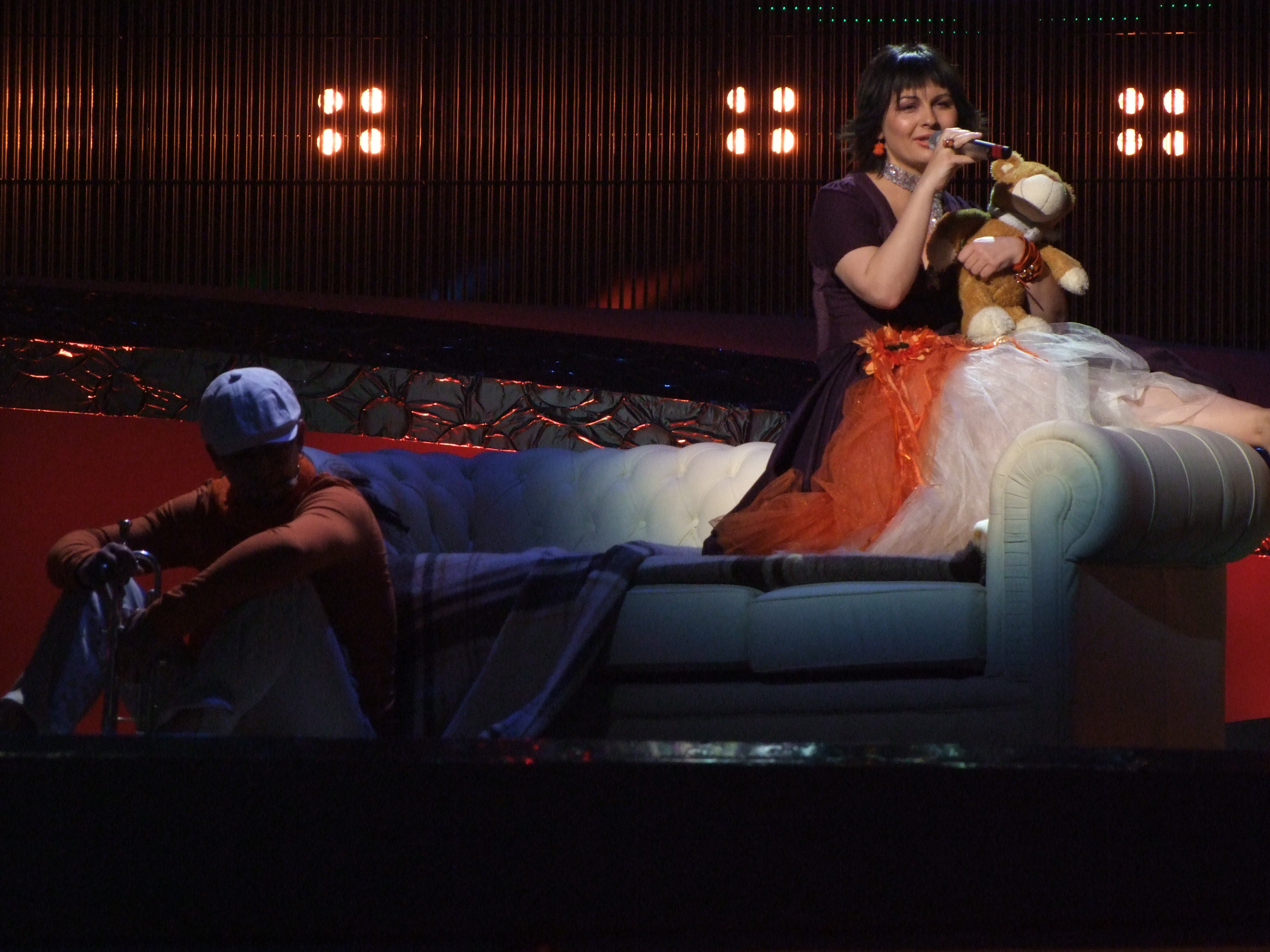
Geta Burlacu performing "A Century of Love" in Belgrade (2008)

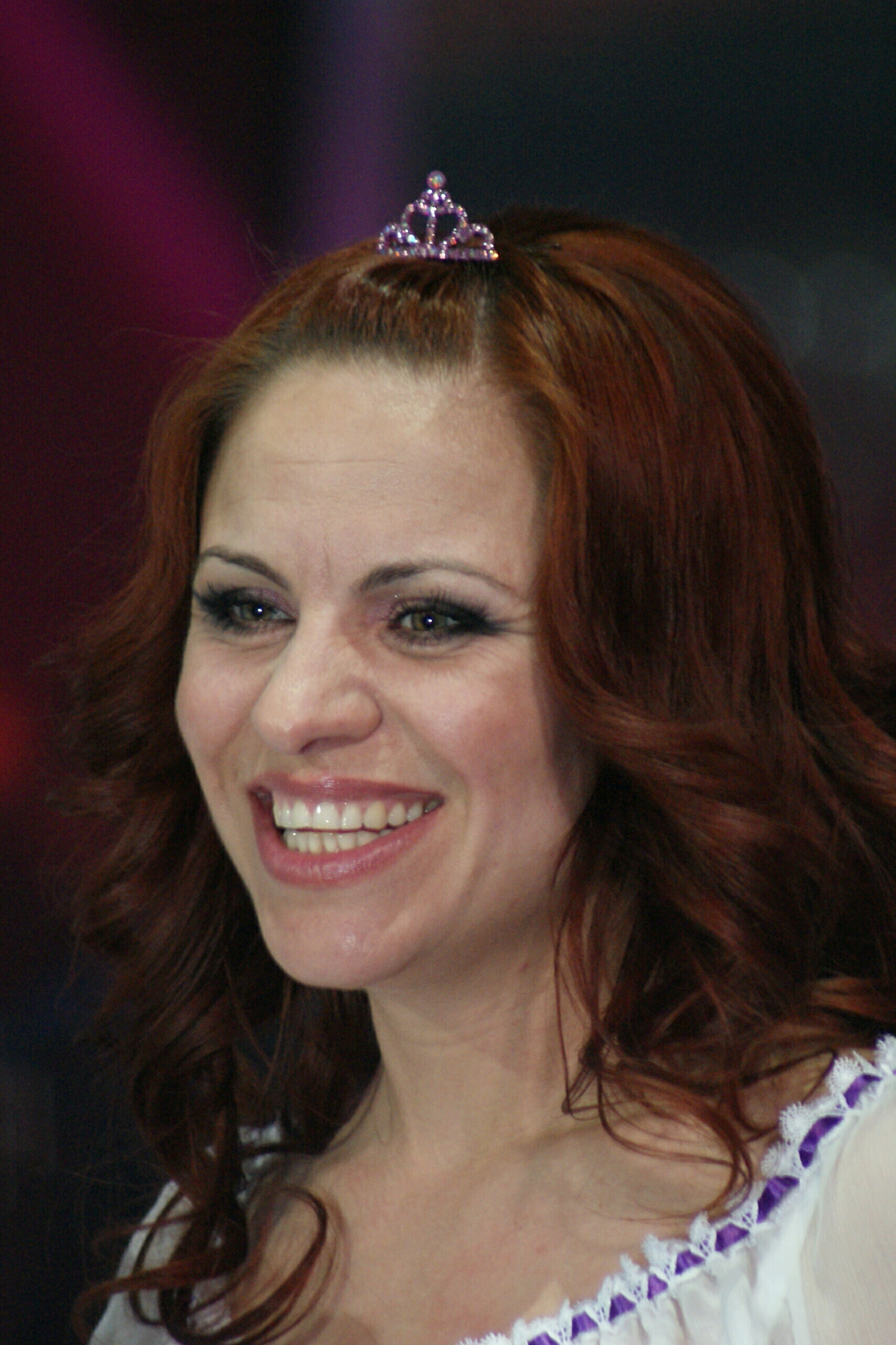
Nelly Ciobanu in Moscow (2009)

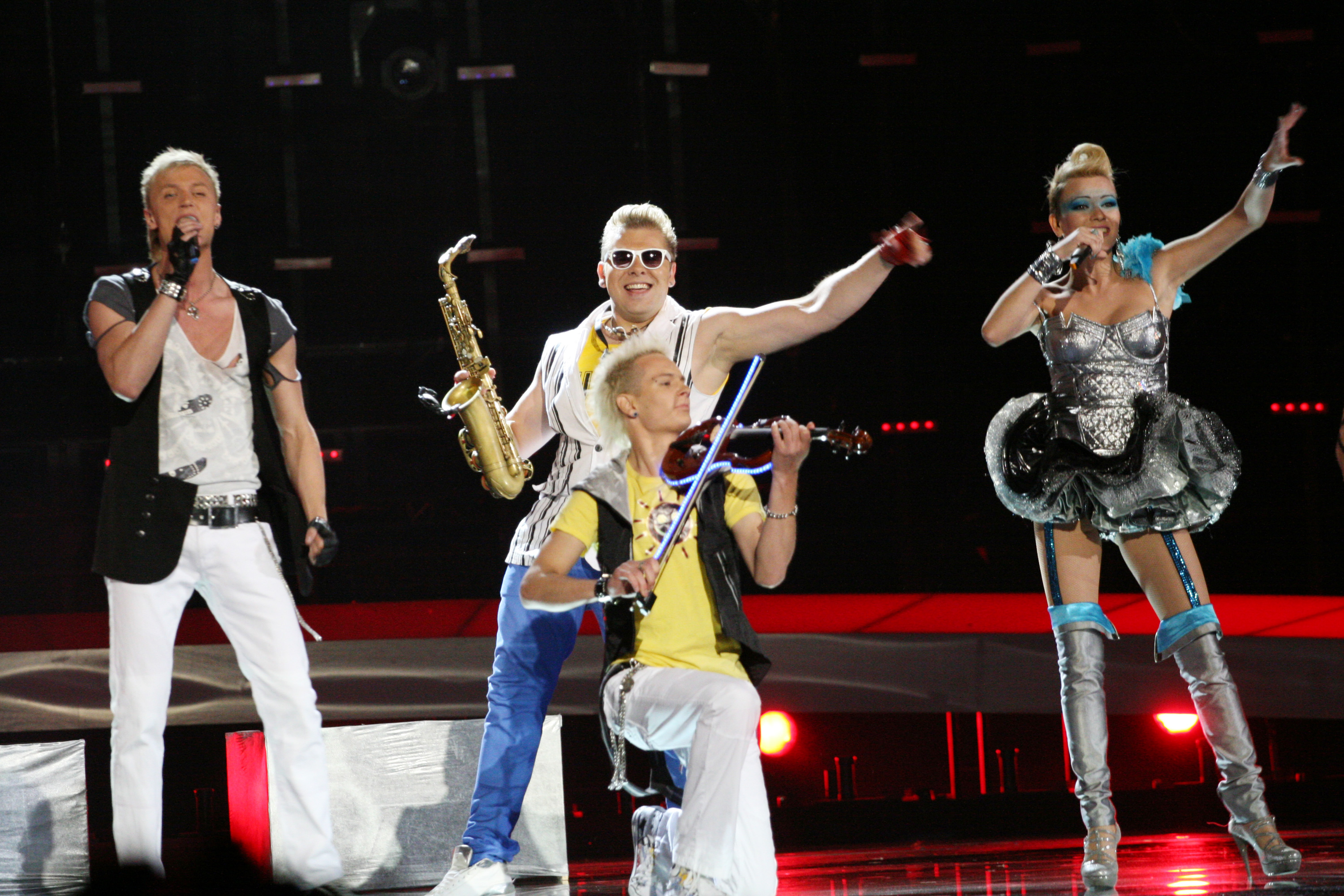
SunStroke Project and Olia Tira performing "Run Away" in Oslo (2010)

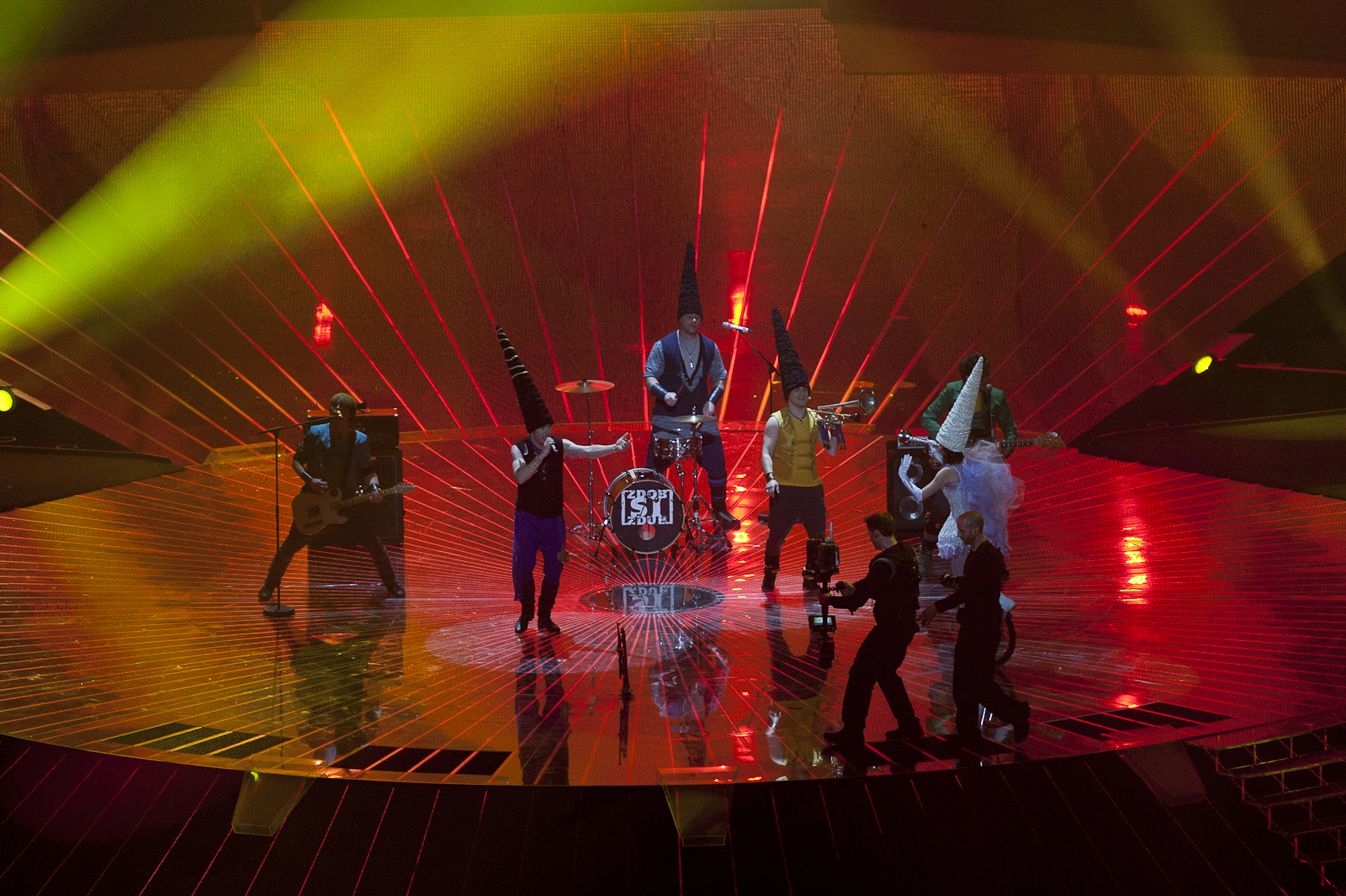
Zdob și Zdub performing "So Lucky" in Düsseldorf (2011)

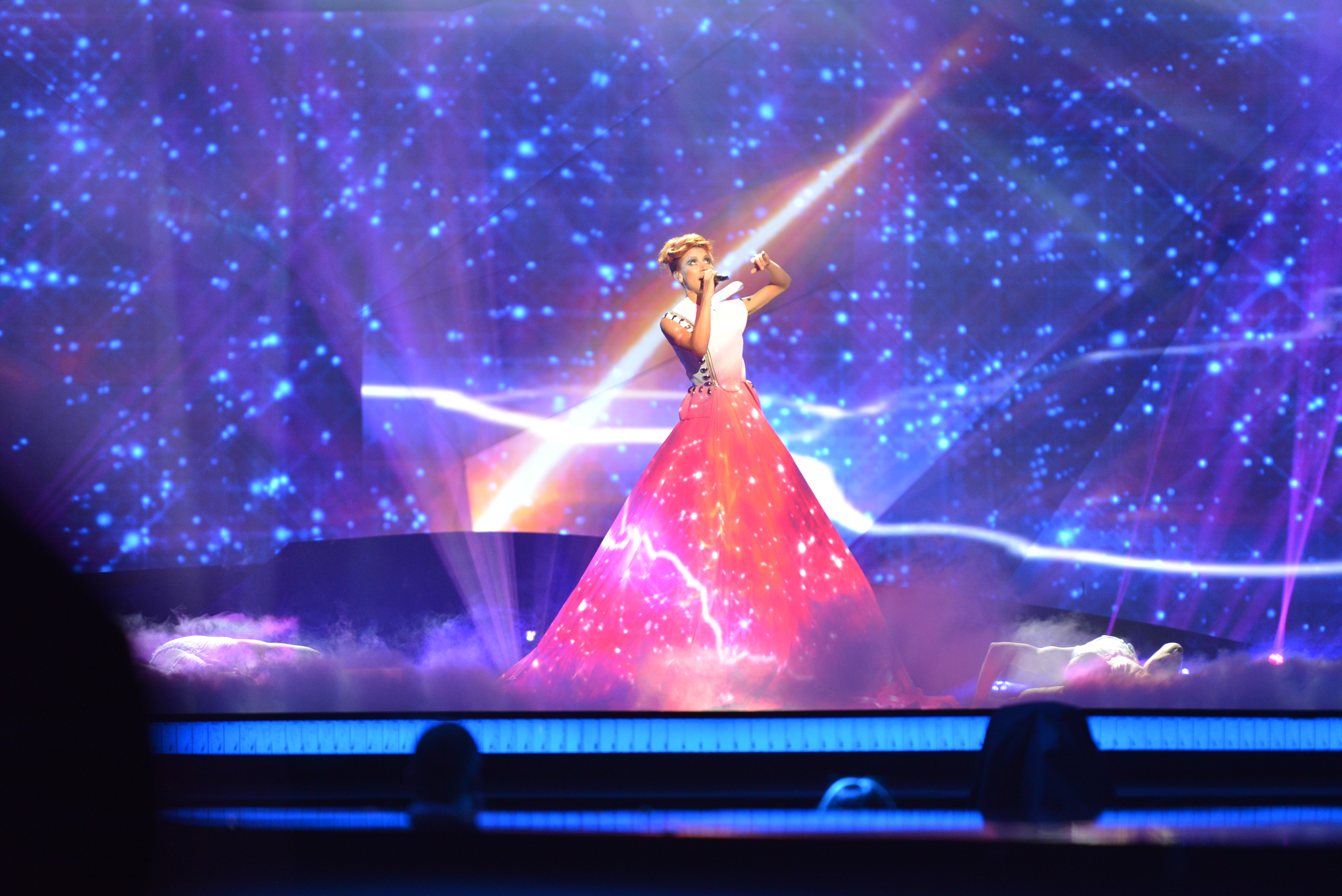
Aliona Moon performing "O mie" in Malmö (2013)

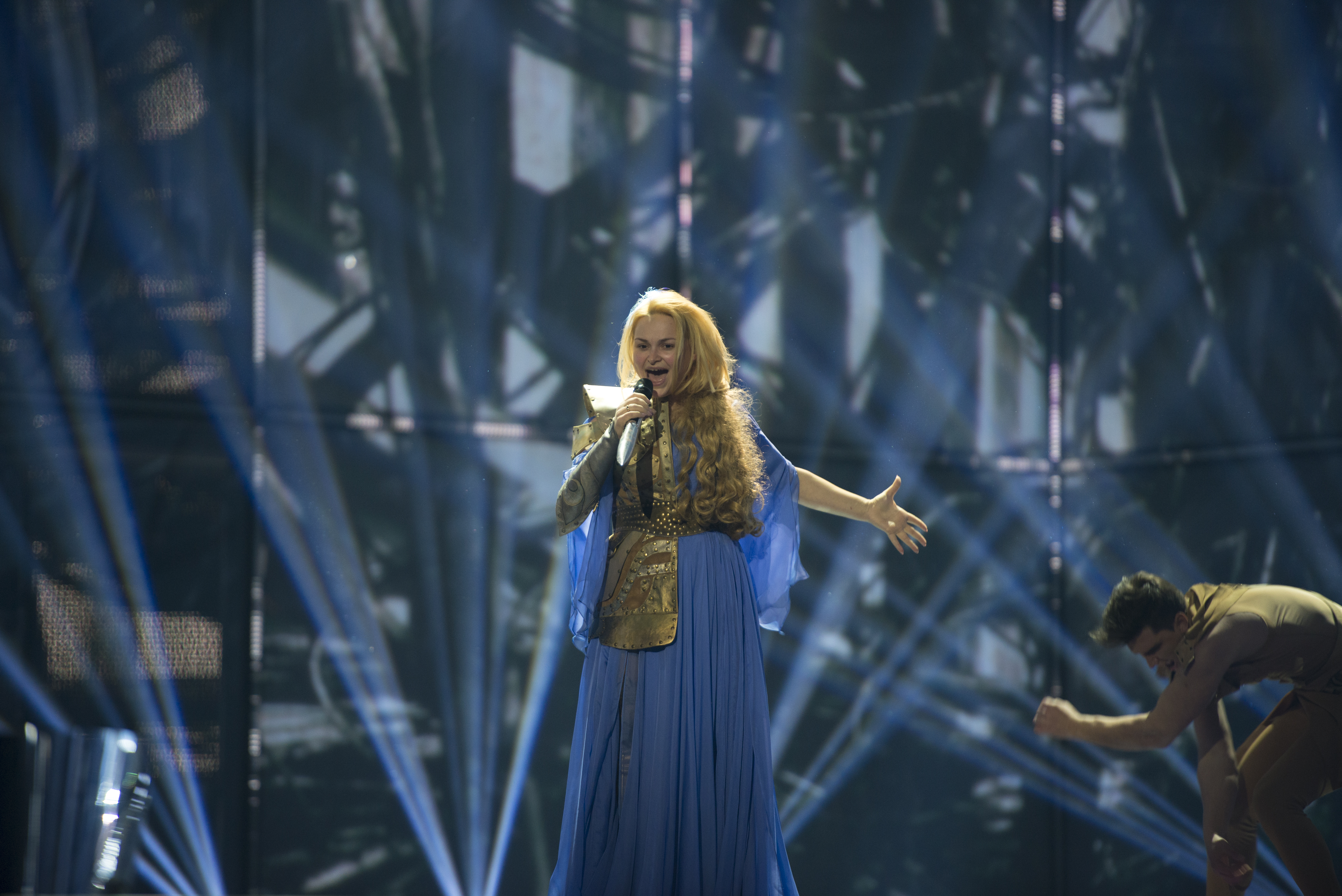
Cristina Scarlat performing "Wild Soul" in Copenhagen (2014)

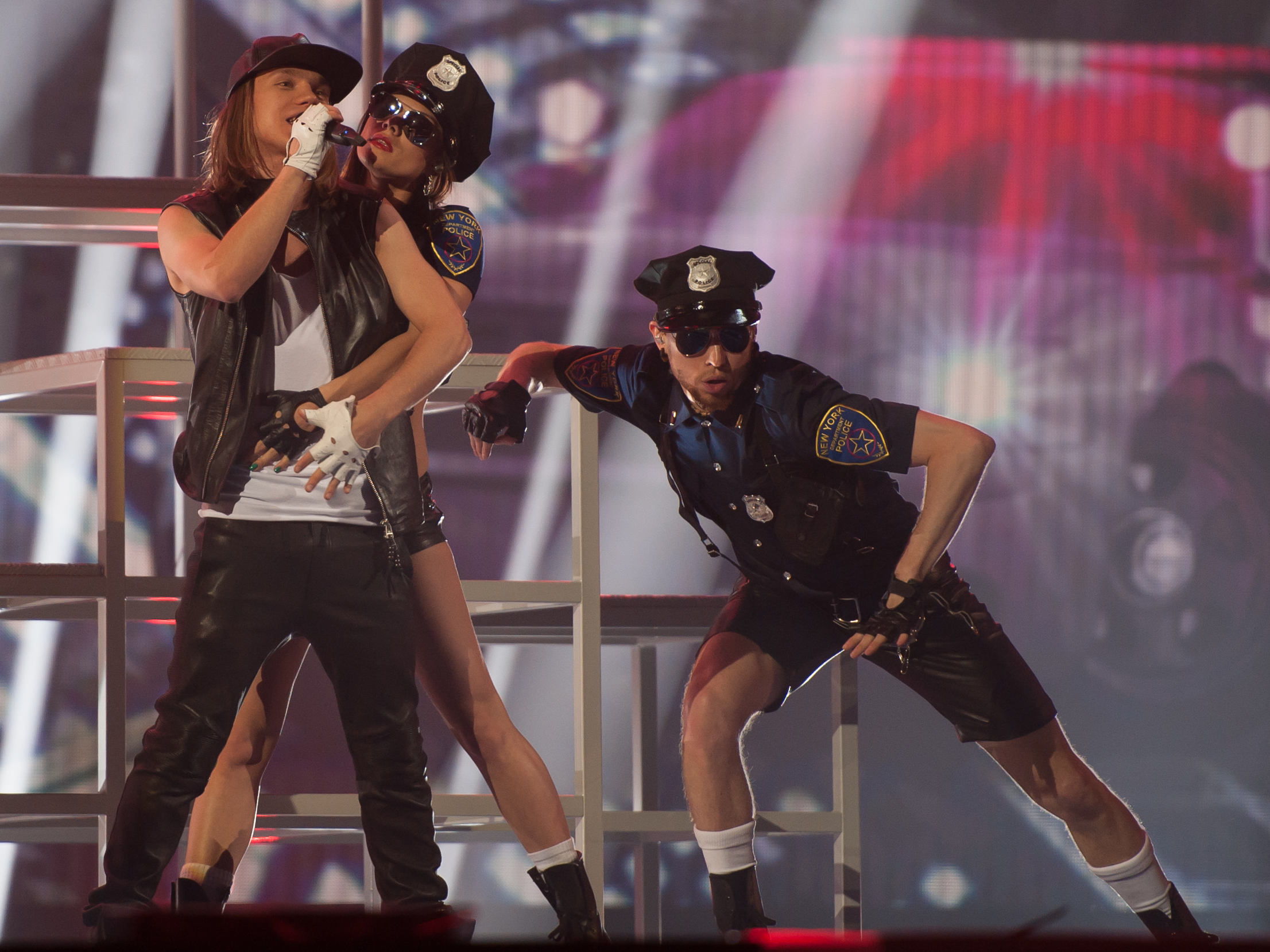
Eduard Romanyuta performing "I Want Your Love" in Vienna (2015)

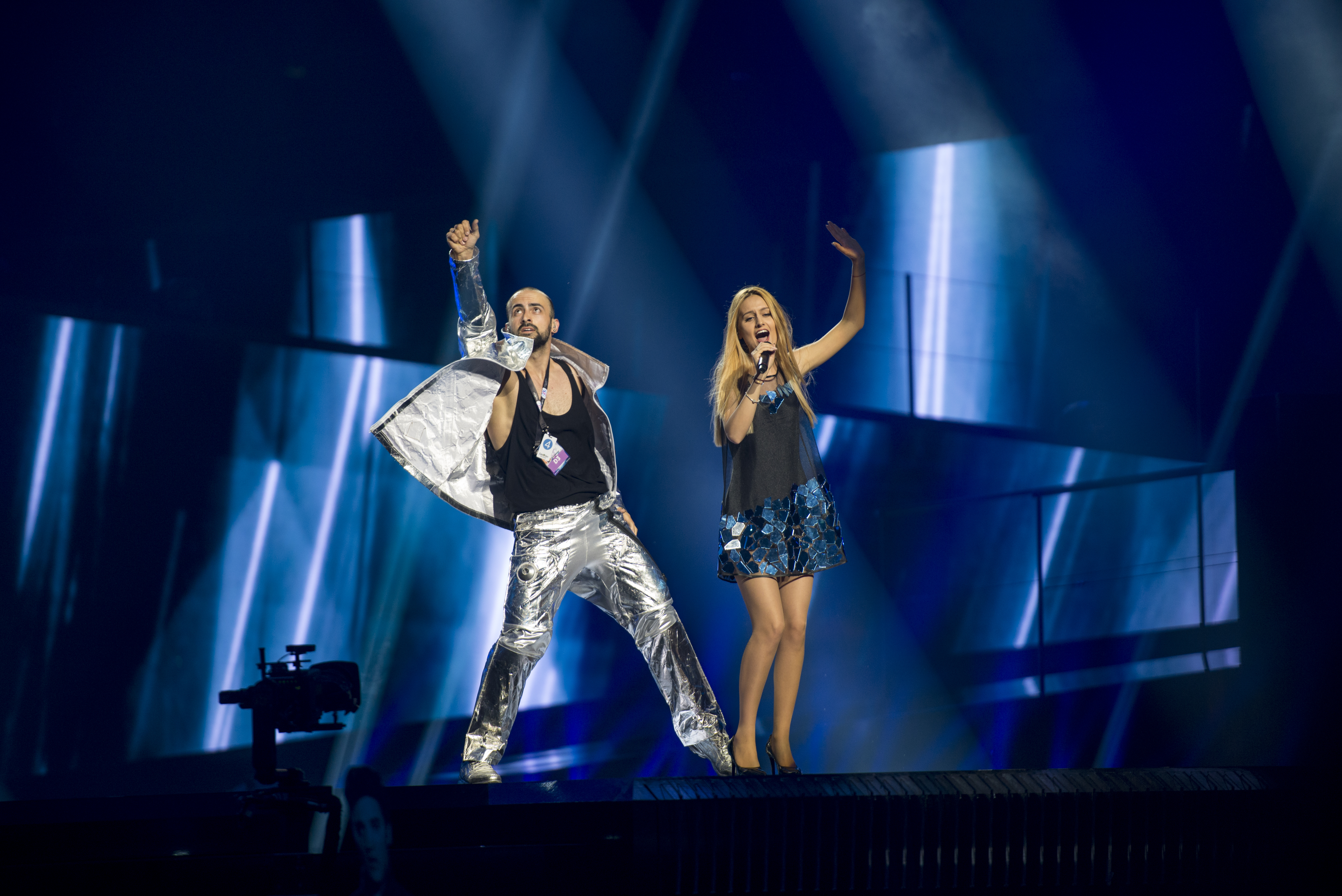
Lidia Isac performing "Falling Stars" in Stockholm (2016)

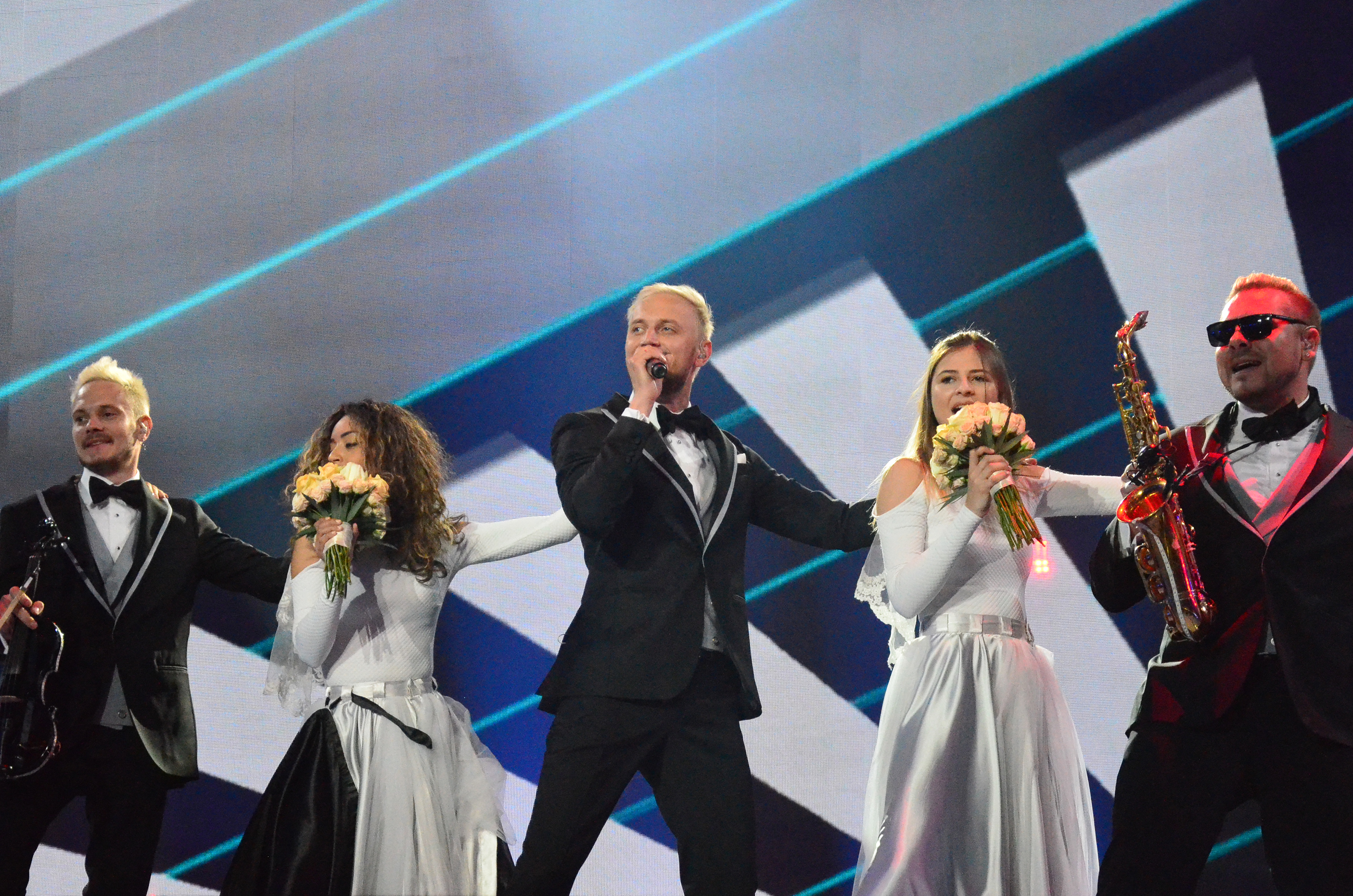
SunStroke Project performing "Hey, Mamma!" in Kyiv (2017)

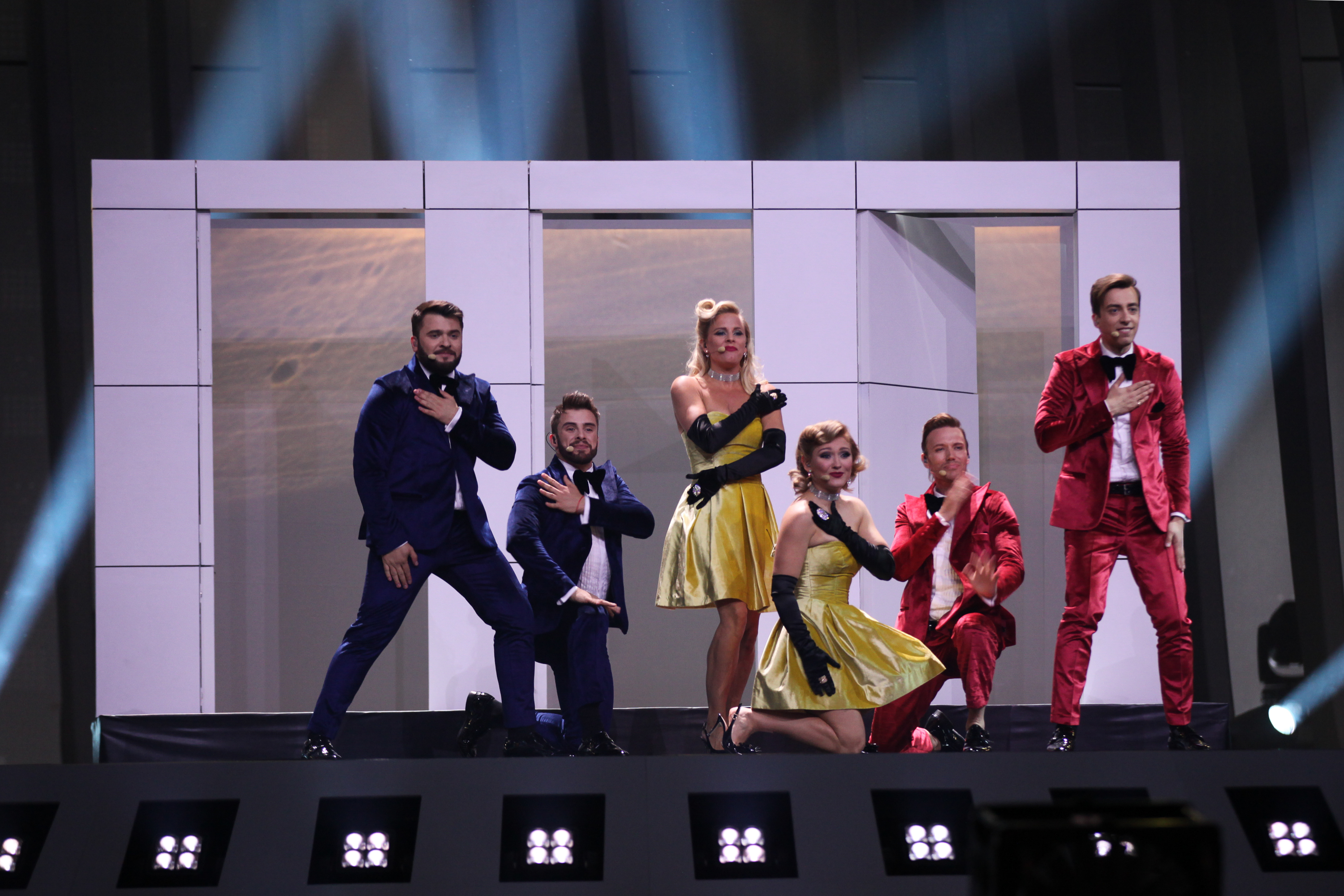
DoReDoS performing "My Lucky Day" in Lisbon (2018)

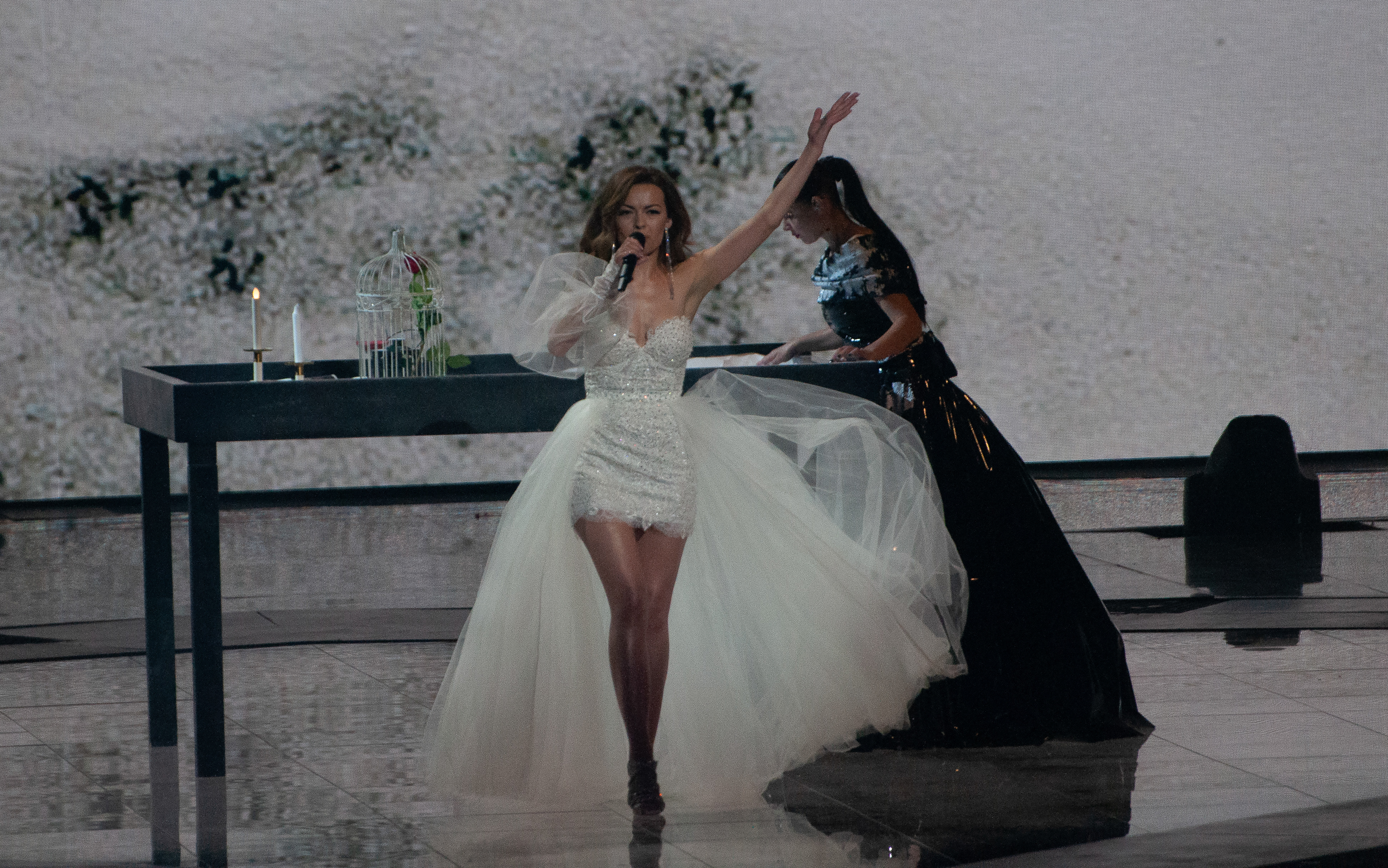
Anna Odobescu performing "Stay" in Tel Aviv (2019)

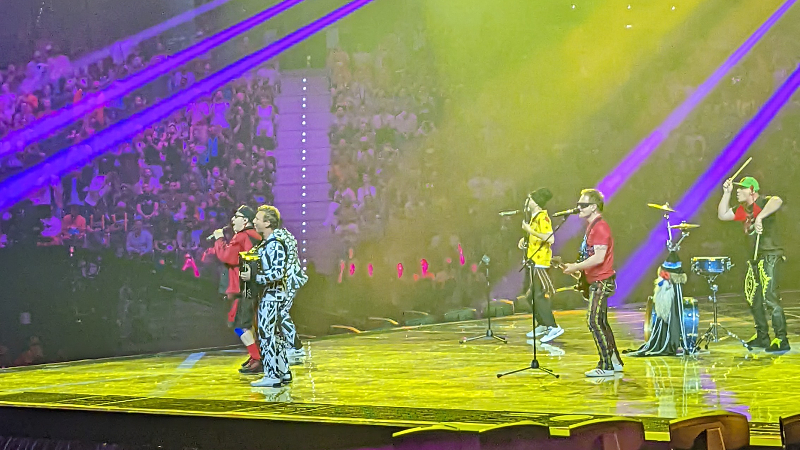
Zdob și Zdub and Advahov Brothers performing "Trenulețul" in Turin (2022)

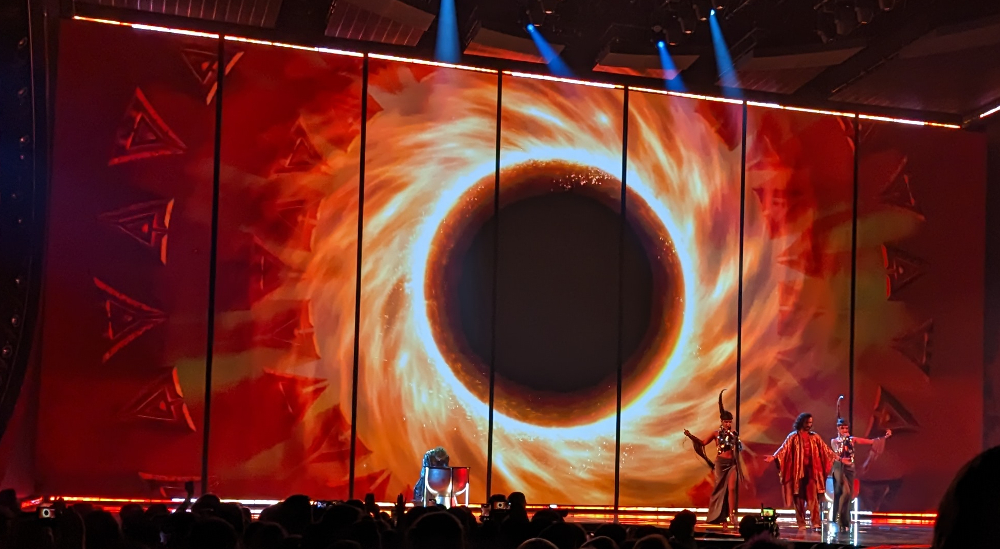
Pasha Parfeni performing "Soarele și luna" in Liverpool (2023)

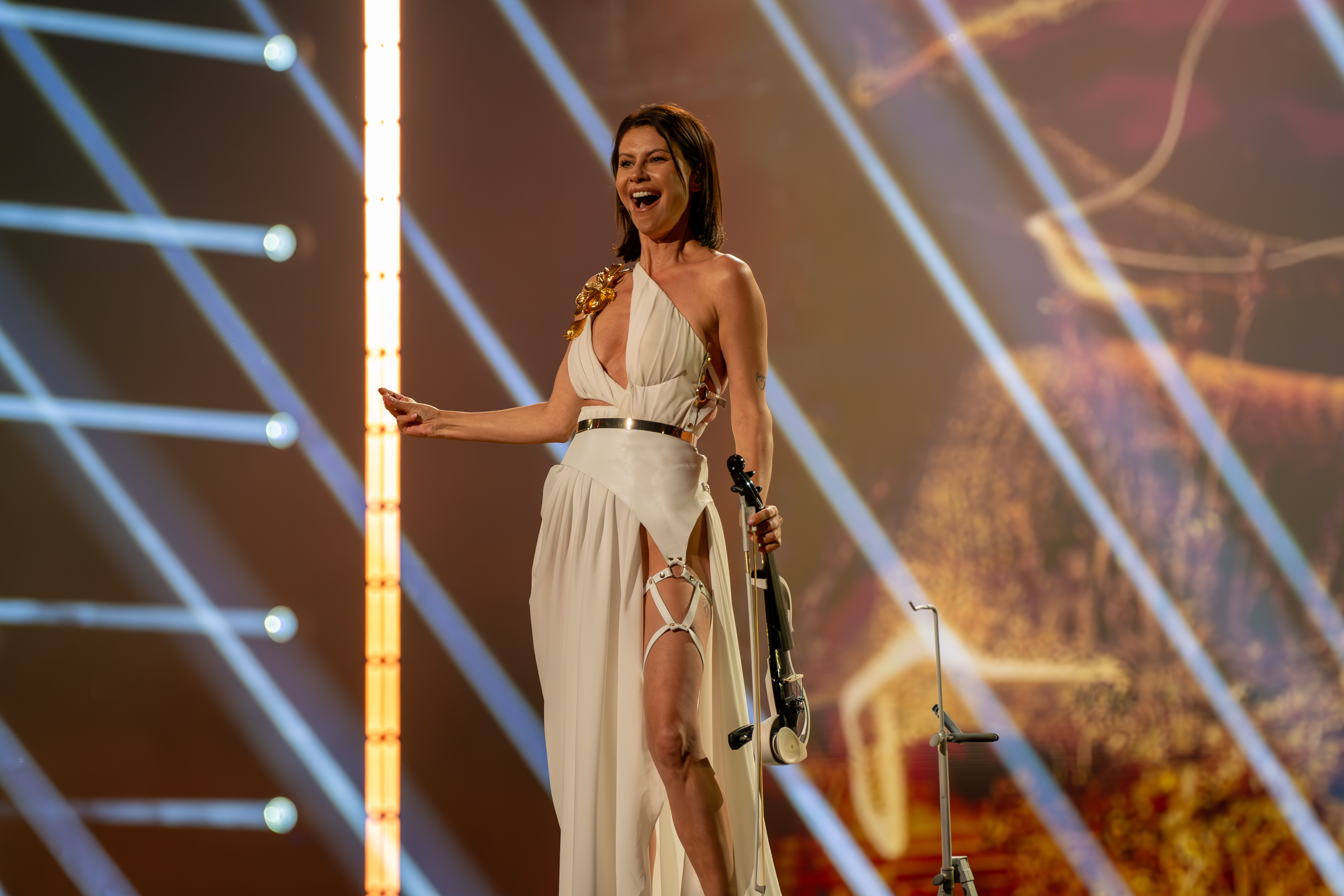
Natalia Barbu performing "In the Middle" in Malmö (2024)

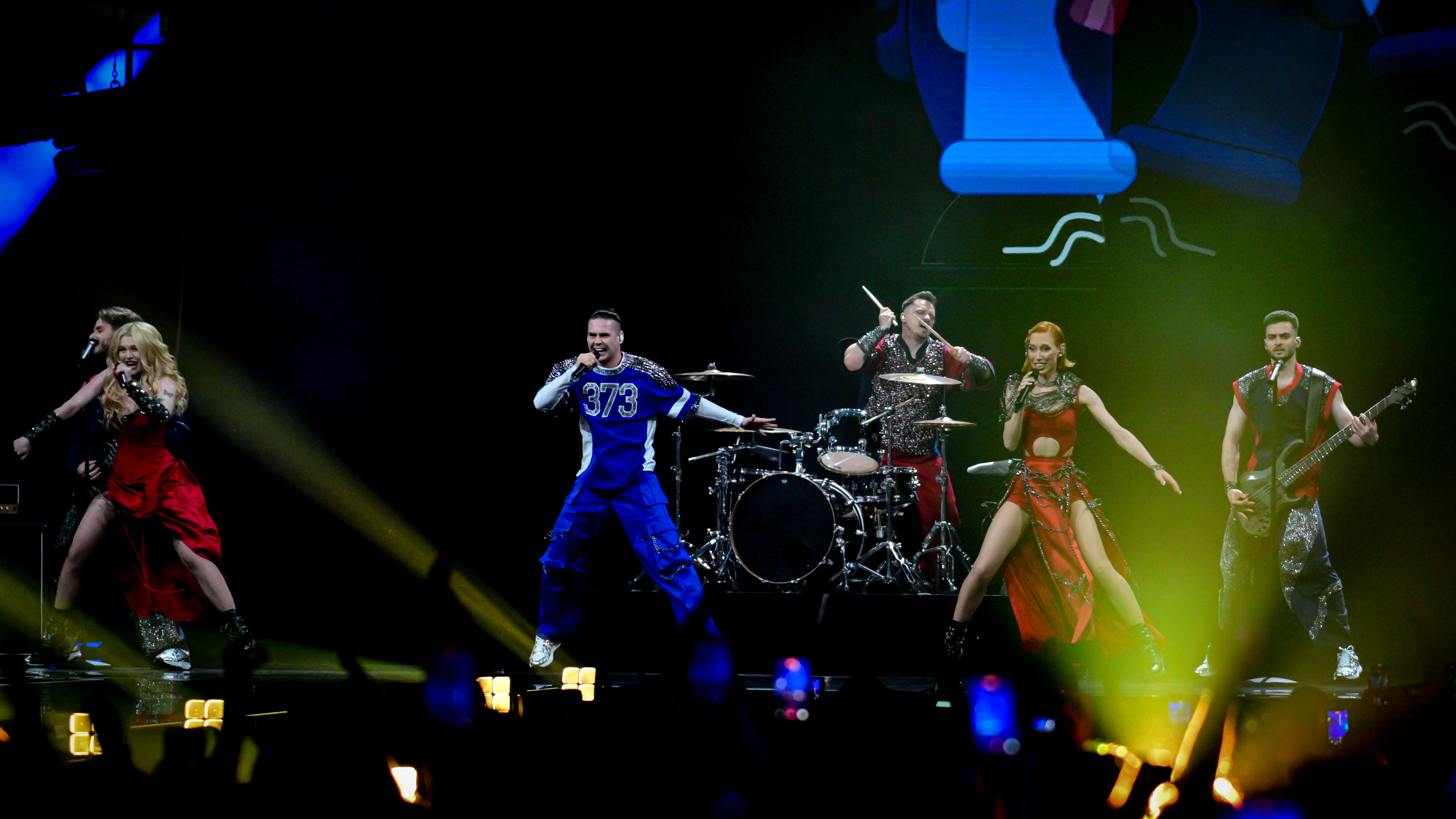
Satoshi performing "Viva, Moldova!" in Vienna (2026)

== See also ==
- Moldova in the Junior Eurovision Song Contest
- List of music released by Moldovan artists that has charted in major music markets
