= Sugar (Natalia Gordienko song) =

2021 song by Natalia Gordienko

Single by Natalia Gordienko
- Released: 4 March 2021
- Genre: Dance-pop
- Length: 2:58
- Label: K2ID; Minos EMI
- Composers: Dimitris Kontopoulos; Philipp Kirkorov
- Lyricists: Mikhail Gutseriev; Sharon Vaughn

Natalia Gordienko singles chronology
| "In Ochii Tai" (2020) | "Sugar" (2021) | "High Heels" (2021) |

Music video
- "Sugar" on YouTube

Eurovision Song Contest 2021 entry
- Country: Moldova
- Artist: Natalia Gordienko
- Composers: Dimitris Kontopoulos; Philipp Kirkorov
- Lyricists: Mikhail Gutseriev; Sharon Vaughn

Finals performance
- Semi-final result: 7th
- Semi-final points: 179
- Final result: 13th
- Final points: 115

Entry chronology
- ◄ "Prison" (2020)
- "Trenulețul" (2022) ►

"Sugar" is a song by Moldovan singer Natalia Gordienko. The song represented Moldova in the Eurovision Song Contest 2021 in Rotterdam, the Netherlands.

== Promotion ==
On 1 March 2021, Natalia Gordienko unveiled a short teaser of the song.

On 9 April 2021, Natalia released Russian version of the song called "Tuz bubi" ("Туз буби"; transl. Ace of diamonds). Music video was also released, it used both new and footage from the original video for "Sugar". The author of the words of the Russian version is Mikhail Gutseriyev.

== Composition ==
Sugar is an uptempo dance-pop song about sexual attraction, using "give me some sugar" as a metaphor for asking a crush out.

== Eurovision Song Contest ==
=== Internal selection ===
On 26 January 2021, TRM confirmed that Natalia Gordienko would represent Moldova in the 2021 contest.

=== In Eurovision ===
The 65th edition of the Eurovision Song Contest took place in Rotterdam, the Netherlands and consisted of two semi-finals on 18 and 20 May 2021, and the grand final on 22 May 2021. According to the Eurovision rules, all participating countries, except the host nation and the "Big Five", consisting of France, Germany, Italy, Spain and the United Kingdom, are required to qualify from one of two semi-finals to compete for the final, although the top 10 countries from the respective semi-final progress to the grand final. On 17 November 2020, it was announced that Moldova would be performing in the first half of the second semi-final of the contest.

The song was performed in the second semi-final on 20 May, with it being the 7th song performed out of 17 songs that day. Sugar would qualify, finishing 7th with 179 points. Two days later, Sugar would be performed in the Eurovision Song Contest 2021 Grand Final. It would eventually get a total 115 points, making it enough to finish 13th.

== Charts ==
Chart performance for "Sugar"
| Chart (2021) | Peak position |
|---|---|
| Lithuania (AGATA) | 49 |
| Netherlands (Single Tip) | 10 |
| Sweden Heatseeker (Sverigetopplistan) | 4 |

Chart performance for "Tuz bubi" (Russian Version)
| Chart (2021) | Peak position |
|---|---|
| CIS Airplay (TopHit) | 138 |
| Russia Airplay (TopHit) | 85 |
