= Arsenie Todiraș =

Moldovan singer (born 1983)

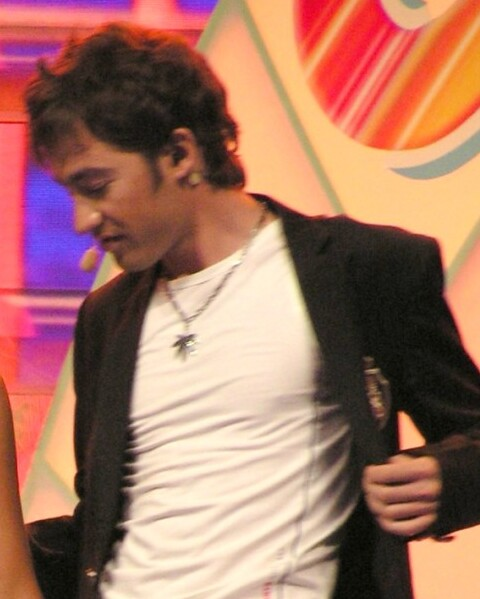
- Todiraș performing at Eurovision in 2006

Background information
- Also known as: Arsenium, ATIKA PATUM
- Born: 22 July 1983 (age 41); Chișinău, Moldavian SSR, Soviet Union
- Origin: Moldova
- Genres: Pop, alternative rock, Electronic dance music (EDM)
- Occupation: Singer
- Years active: 2000–present
- Website: arseniummusic.com

Arsenie Todiraș (sometimes spelt Toderaș; born 22 July 1983) is a Moldovan singer, best known for representing Moldova in the Eurovision Song Contest 2006. He grew up in Moldova with his mother, father and younger sister. He was once the youngest member of boyband O-Zone. He now pursues a solo career in Russia and Romania, under the mononym Arsenie or at times the stage name Arsenium.

Arsenie represented Moldova at the Eurovision Song Contest 2006 with the song "Loca" (Crazy in Spanish) with Natalia Gordienco featuring Connect-R, finishing in 20th place with 22 points.

He took part in the Dansez pentru tine dance contest, the Romanian version of Dancing with the Stars, and took the second place, while the first was given to the Romanian singer Andra.

His first solo album, The 33rd Element, was released in Romania in the summer of 2006.

In 2008 he released the single "Rumadai", reaching the Top 100 in Germany and Austria. With the same single he represented Romania at the Viña del Mar Festival 2014 in Chile, winning the Best Performer place and therefore the Silver Seagull (the best prize granted in the International Contest).

In 2019, he had his first release under his new alias ATIKA PATUM, "Atikapatum", which was an EDM song released on Dimitri Vegas & Like Mike's label Smash The House. In March 2020, he released a follow-up called "Ale-Aleluia".

== Discography ==
=== Studio albums ===
List of studio albums
Title	Album details
The 33rd Element	Released: 2006; Label: Cat; Format: CD, digital download

=== Singles ===
List of singles, with selected chart positions
Title	Year	Peak chart positions							Album
Title	Year	MDA	AUT	FRA	GER	ROM	RUS	UKR	Album
"Love Me... Love Me..."	2005	*	—	36	33	—	—	50 (Note: DJ Ross Radio Edit)	The 33rd Element
"Loca" (featuring Natalia Gordienko and Connect-R)	2006	*	—	—	—	4	—	16	The 33rd Element
"Professional HeartBreakers"	2007	*	—	—	—	—	—	86	The 33rd Element
"Rumadai"	2008	*	50	—	32	—	—	200	Non-album singles
"Wake Up"	2008	*	—	—	—	—	—	—	Non-album singles
"25"	2009	*	—	—	—	—	—	—	Non-album singles
"Minimum"	2010	*	—	—	—	—	—	—	Non-album singles
"Ischezni"	2010	*	—	—	—	—	—	—	Non-album singles
"Remember Me"	2010	*	—	—	—	—	—	—	Non-album singles
"Erase It"	2010	*	—	—	—	—	—	—	Non-album singles
"Bang Bang"	2010	*	—	—	—	—	—	—	Non-album singles
"My Heart" (featuring Lena Kynazeva)	2011	*	—	—	—	—	—	—	Non-album singles
"I'm Giving Up"	2012	*	—	—	—	—	—	—	Non-album singles
"Aquamarina" (featuring Janyela)	2013	*	—	—	—	—	—	—	Non-album singles
"Porque te amo" / "Do rassveta" (featuring Sati Kazanova)	2014	*	—	—	—	—	17	9	Non-album singles
"Bella Bella"	2015	*	—	—	—	—	—	28	Non-album singles
"Tol'ko s toboy" / "What Is Love"	2016	*	—	—	—	—	—	—	Non-album singles
"Nezemnaya ti"	2016	*	—	—	—	—	—	—	Non-album singles
"Aromatami"	2017	*	—	—	—	—	—	—	Non-album singles
"A on drugoy, mama" (with Mianna)	2017	*	—	—	—	—	166	—	Non-album singles
"Bon Ami" (featuring Heren)	2018	*	—	—	—	—	—	—	Non-album singles
"Depresie"	2019	*	—	—	—	—	—	—	Non-album singles
"Atikapatum" (as Atika Patum)	2019	*	—	—	—	—	—	80	Non-album singles
"Lay Down" (with Radu Sîrbu)	2020	*	—	—	—	—	—	—	Non-album singles
"Ale Aleluia" (as Atika Patum)	2020	*	—	—	—	—	—	—	Non-album singles
"Coco-Inna" (with Hanna and Tymma)	2021	*	—	—	—	—	—	—	Non-album singles
"Omanare" (as Atika Patum)	2021	*	—	—	—	—	—	—	Non-album singles
"Umani" (as Atika Patum)	2021	*	—	—	—	—	—	—	Non-album singles
"Maracuya" (with Mianna and Tymma)	2022	—	—	—	—	—	—	—	Non-album singles
"O zi" (with Holograf)	2022	185	—	—	—	—	—	—	Non-album singles
"Lumea asta" (with Paula Hriscu)	2023	—	—	—	—	—	—	—	Non-album singles
"Bella Hadid (Come to Madrid)" (with Tymma)	2023	200	—	—	—	—	—	—	Non-album singles
"God Is a Code" (as Atika Patum)	2024	—	—	—	—	—	—	—	Non-album singles
"—" denotes a recording that did not chart or was not released in that territory. "*" denotes that the chart did not exist at that time.

== See also ==
- List of music released by Moldovan artists that has charted in major music markets

== Notes ==
Awards and achievements
Preceded by Zdob și Zdub with Boonika bate doba	Moldova in the Eurovision Song Contest (with Natalia Gordienco and Connect-R); 2006	Succeeded by Natalia Barbu with Fight
Awards and achievements
Preceded by none (Debut entry)	Romania in the Viña del Mar International Song Festival; 2014	Succeeded by
