= Connect-R =

Romanian musician

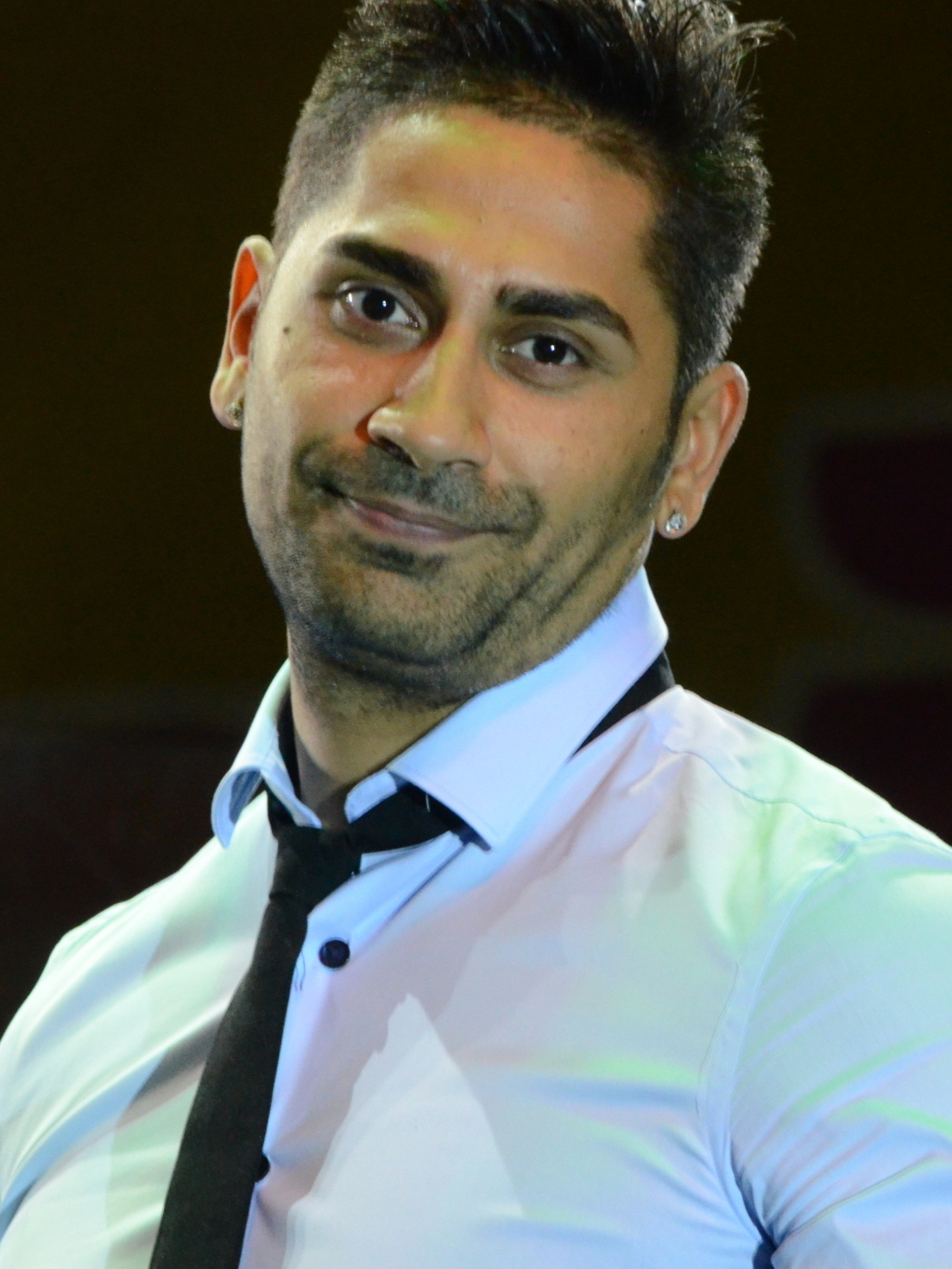
- Connect-R in 2012

Background information
- Born: Ștefan Mihalache; June 9, 1982 (age 44)
- Origin: București, Romania
- Genres: Hip hop, trap, R&B, pop, electronic music, raggamuffin, dancehall
- Occupations: Rapper, singer, producer, actor
- Years active: 1997–present
- Labels: Rappin' On Production, Roton
- Website: connect-r.eu

Ștefan Relu Mihalache (born 9 June 1982), better known by his stage name Connect-R, is a Romanian rapper, singer, producer, and occasional actor. He is best known for his association with Romanian hip hop group R.A.C.L.A. early in his career and the successful solo career that followed his leaving of the group. He has been noted as having a baritone-range singing voice and an eclectic musical style.

== Biography ==
=== Early life and career ===
Mihalache was born on 9 June 1982 in Bucharest, and he is of Roma descent. By the age of 8, he became a professional dancer as a member of the dance group Primăvara. By the age of 15, he had become involved with hip hop music and in 1997 recorded "Observ", the first track in his professional career. He has one child.

He was chosen by Disney Channel Romania to sing "Sunt legat în lanț" song from the animated series Phineas and Ferb.

He also sings in Romanian the main theme of the animated movie - Treasure Planet.

== Discography ==
=== Studio albums ===
- Dacă dragostea dispare (2007)
- From Nothing to Something (2012)
- Drăgostit (2016)

=== Singles ===
Year	Title	Peak chart positions	Album
Year	Title	Ro	Album
2007	"Dacă dragostea dispare" (featuring Alex Velea)	-	Dacă dragostea dispare
2008	"Nu-ți pierde dragostea"	-	Dacă dragostea dispare
2009	"Burning Love"	3	From Nothing To Something
2009	"Murderer"		From Nothing To Something
2010	"Still" (featuring Chris Mayer)	1	From Nothing To Something
2010	"American Dream" (featuring Puya)		From Nothing To Something
2011	"Ring the Alarm"	7	From Nothing To Something
2011	"Take It Slow"		From Nothing To Something
2012	"Vara nu dorm"	1	From Nothing To Something
2012	"Love Is the Way"	4	From Nothing To Something
2013	"Dă-te-n dragostea mea"	–	TBA
2014	"Tren De Noapte"	–	TBA
2024	”Vise la Plic”		

Awards and achievements
Preceded by Zdob și Zdub with Boonika bate doba	Moldova in the Eurovision Song Contest (with Arsenium and Natalia Gordienko); 2006	Succeeded by Natalia Barbu with Fight
