= Moldova in the Eurovision Song Contest 2014 =

- Eurovision Song Contest 2014
- Country: Moldova
- Selection process: O melodie pentru Europa 2014
- Selection date: 15 March 2014

Competing entry
- Song: "Wild Soul"
- Artist: Cristina Scarlat
- Songwriters: Ivan Akulov; Lidia Scarlat

Placement
- Semi-final result: Failed to qualify (16th)

Participation chronology

Moldova was represented at the Eurovision Song Contest 2014 with the song "Wild Soul" written by Ivan Aculov and Lidia Scarlat. The song was performed by Cristina Scarlat. The Moldovan broadcaster TeleRadio-Moldova (TRM) organised the national final O melodie pentru Europa 2014 in order to select the Moldovan entry for the 2014 contest in Copenhagen, Denmark. 64 entries competed to represent Moldova in Copenhagen, with 24 being shortlisted to participate in the televised national final after auditioning in front of a jury panel. After two semi-finals and a final which took place in March 2014, "Wild Soul" performed by Cristina Scarlat emerged as the winner after gaining the most points following the combination of votes from a jury panel and a public televote.

Moldova was drawn to compete in the first semi-final of the Eurovision Song Contest which took place on 6 May 2014. Performing during the show in position 11, "Wild Soul" was not announced among the top 10 entries of the first semi-final and therefore did not qualify to compete in the final. It was later revealed that Moldova placed sixteenth (last) out of the 16 participating countries in the semi-final with 13 points.

== Background ==
Prior to the 2014 Contest, Moldova had participated in the Eurovision Song Contest nine times since its first entry in 2005. The nation's best placing in the contest was sixth, which it achieved in 2005 with the song "Boonika bate doba" performed by Zdob și Zdub. Other than their debut entry, to this point, Moldova's only other top ten placing at the contest was achieved in 2007 where "Fight" performed by Natalia Barbu placed tenth. In the 2013 contest, "O mie" performed by Aliona Moon qualified Moldova to compete in the final and placed eleventh.

The Moldovan national broadcaster, TeleRadio-Moldova (TRM), broadcast the event within Moldova and organised the selection process for the nation's entry. TRM confirmed their intentions to participate at the 2014 Eurovision Song Contest on 22 November 2013. Moldova has selected their entry via a national selection show since 2008, a procedure that was continued for their 2014 participation.

== Before Eurovision ==
=== O melodie pentru Europa 2014 ===
O melodie pentru Europa 2014 was the national final format developed by TRM in order to select Moldova's entry for the Eurovision Song Contest 2014. The event included two semi-finals and a final to be held on 11, 13 and 15 March 2014, respectively. All shows in the competition were broadcast on Moldova 1, Radio Moldova and Radio Moldova Tineret as well as online via the broadcaster's official website trm.md and the official Eurovision Song Contest website eurovision.tv.

==== Format ====
The selection of the competing entries for the national final and ultimately the Moldovan Eurovision entry took place over three rounds. The first round occurred on 25 January 2014 where a jury panel shortlisted forty entries from the received submissions based on criteria such as the quality of the melody and composition, vocals and manner of the performance and the originality of the song, however, TRM decided that the remaining 24 entries would also proceed to the second round due to a technical mistake. The second round was a live audition of the 64 entries in front of a jury panel that took place on 1 February 2014. Entries were assessed on criteria such as voice quality, stage presence and strength of the composition. The panel selected 24 semi-finalists to proceed to the third round, the televised national final. 12 semi-finalists competed in each semi-final on 11 and 13 March 2014. Eight songs qualified to the final from each semi-final; seven of the qualifiers qualified based on the combined votes from an expert jury and public televoting results, while the eighth qualifier in each semi-final was the entry that achieved the highest televote score from the remaining entries after a second round of public televoting took place during an after-show. The sixteen qualifying entries competed in the final on 15 March 2014 where the winner was selected by the 50/50 combination of an expert jury vote and a public televote. In the event of a tie, the entry that receives the highest score from the expert jury vote was declared the winner.

==== Competing entries ====
Artists and composers had the opportunity to submit their entries between 26 December 2013 and 23 January 2014. Artists were required to be of Moldovan nationality, while songwriters could hold any nationality. Artists could submit more than one song, however, if they were chosen as a semi-finalist with more than one song, the artist would have to choose one entry to continue with in the competition. At the conclusion of the submission deadline, 64 valid entries were received by the broadcaster. A jury consisting of Anatol Chiriac (composer), Valentin Dânga (composer), Nelly Ciobanu (singer, 2009 Moldovan Eurovision entrant), Marcel Ștefăneț (conductor and instrumentalist), Aliona Triboi (singer and musicologist), Andrei Sava (composer) and Angela Rudenco (musicologist, Radio Moldova editor and presenter) initially selected 40 out of the 64 received entries to proceed to the audition round, however TRM ultimately decided to include all received entries to proceed to the auditions after an appeal by three of the artists regarding the rules of the competition due to a technical mistake in the initial screening process.

The live audition round took place on 1 February 2014 at Casa Radio in Chișinău where 24 semi-finalists were selected to advance. The auditions were broadcast online via trm.md. The jury panel that evaluated the songs during the live auditions and selected the 24 semi-finalists consisted of Anatol Chiriac (composer), Valentin Dânga (composer), Nelly Ciobanu (singer and 2009 Moldovan Eurovision entrant), Aliona Triboi (singer and musicologist), Andrei Sava (composer), Alex Calancea (instrumentalist and producer), Ilona Stepan (conductor), Igor Cobileanski (director) and Tatiana Postolachi (lyricist). "Is This The Way (You Want Me)" performed by Ray Gligor and "Take a Look at Me Now" performed by Nicollette were withdrawn from the competition in favour of both songs competing in the 2014 Lithuanian Eurovision national final and therefore the artists did not attend the auditions. The 24 semi-finalists were allocated to one of the two semi-finals, each containing 12 entries, in a draw that was held on 27 February 2014 at TRM Headquarters in Chișinău. Among the semi-finalists was 2010 Moldovan Eurovision entrant Flux Light (Olia Tira).

On 12 February 2014, Boris Covali withdrew his song "Flying" from the competition after a managerial decision and replaced with "Perfect Day", which was also performed during the audition round but not selected for the semi-finals. Controversy later arose surrounding one of the submitted songs "Taking Care of a Broken Heart" performed by Felicia Dunaf, which was later entered into the Swedish Eurovision selection Melodifestivalen 2016 to be performed by Anna Book in Swedish under the title "Himmel för två". The song was therefore disqualified from the competition as it had already been published online and performed publicly during the auditions.

| Artist | Song | Songwriter(s) |
|---|---|---|
| Alina Sorochina | "Ascultă-mă tăcere" | Marian Stârcea, Radmila Popovici-Paraschiv |
| Ana Cernicova | "Dragostea divină" | Ana Cernicova |
| Anna Gulko | "Happy Tomorrow" | Anna Gulko |
| Aurel Chirtoacă | "Urme de iubiri" | Aurel Chirtoacă, Viorica Nagacevschi |
| Boris Covali | "Flying" | Michael James Down, Primož Poglajen, Jonas Gladnikoff, Dimitri Stassos |
| Boris Covali | "Perfect Day" | Brandon Stone, Jodie Rose |
| Carolina Gorun | "Turn the Tide" | Mathias Kallenberger, Andreas Berlin, Andreas Anastasiou, Lawrence Bridge, Stephen Rudden |
| Cristina Scarlat | "Wild Soul" | Ivan Aculov, Lidia Scarlat |
| Curly | "Your Recovery" | Grigore Chirsanov, Luca Inga |
| Dana Markitan | "Queen of the Dancefloor" | Nikola Radunović, Dejan Nikodijević |
| Diana Brescan | "Hallelujah" | Eugen Doibani, Radmila Popovici-Paraschiv |
| Diana Staver | "One and All" | Hannah Mancini, Raay, Charlie Mason |
| Doiniţa Gherman | "Energy" | Doiniţa Gherman, Vadim Luchin, Cătălin Gondiu |
| Edict | "Forever" | Valeriu Cataraga, Sonyat Cioceacova |
| Felicia Dunaf | "The Way I Do" | Eugen Doibani |
| Flux Light | "Never Stop No" | Alexandru Buhnă |
| Glam Girls | "You Believed In Me" | Niklas Peterson, Bridget Benenate, Mikael Albertsson, Andreas Anastasiou |
| Lana Lights | "Solar Wind" | Serghei Forman, Ana Colesnicov |
| Lucia S. | "Frozen" | Vitalie Catană, Gloria Gorceag |
| Margarita Ciorici and Metafora | "Vis" | Alexandru Gorbos, Vica Demici |
| Mikaella | "Follow Your Dreams" | Vladislav Bobotrîn |
| Paralela 47 | "Fragmente" | Paralela 47, Alecu Matrăguna |
| Rodica Olişevschi | "Without You" | Rodica Olişevschi |
| Tatiana Heghea | "I'm Yours" | David Daieres |
| Vlad Ray | "Freedom" | Vladislav Bobotrîn |

==== Semi-finals ====
The two semi-finals took place on 11 and 13 March 2014 at TRM Studio 2 in Chișinău. The first semi-final was hosted by Evelina Vîrlan and Sergiu Beznițchi with Daniela Babici reporting from the green room, while the second semi-final was hosted by Nicu Ţurcanu and Djulieta Gânu with Vlad Ardovan reporting from the green room. In each semi-final twelve acts competed and seven songs qualified to the final based on the combination of votes from a public televote and the votes of an expert jury, while an eighth qualifier was selected by an additional televote between the remaining non-qualifiers and was revealed during a post semi-final discussion show. The jury that voted in the semi-finals included Alex Calancea (instrumentalist and producer), Andrei Sava (composer), Cristina Pintilie (singer), Tatiana Postolachi (lyricist), Ruslan Ţaranu (singer/composer), Ilona Stepan (conductor), Nelly Ciobanu (singer, 2009 Moldovan Eurovision entrant), Anatol Chiriac (composer) and Ina Jeltova (journalist).

In addition to the performances of the competing entries, Nelly Ciobanu, 2008 Moldovan Eurovision entrant Geta Burlacu, 2012 Moldovan Eurovision entrant Pasha Parfeny and singers Cristina Croitoru, Gicu Cimbir, Irina Kitoroagă and Karizma performed as guests in the first semi-final, while the band Millenium performed as a guest in the second semi-final.

First round (jury and televote) qualifier
Second round (televote-only) qualifier

Semi-final 1 – 11 March 2014
| R/O | Artist | Song | Jury | | Televote | | Total | Place |
| R/O | Artist | Song | Votes | Points | Votes | Points | Total | Place |
|---|---|---|---|---|---|---|---|---|
| 1 | Boris Covali | "Perfect Day" | 98 | 12 | 1,170 | 12 | 24 | 1 |
| 2 | Flux Light | "Never Stop No" | 74 | 7 | 375 | 5 | 12 | 4 |
| 3 | Alina Sorochina | "Ascultă-mă tăcere" | 50 | 3 | 105 | 0 | 3 | 10 |
| 4 | Vlad Ray | "Freedom" | 40 | 2 | 167 | 3 | 5 | 9 |
| 5 | Felicia Dunaf | "The Way I Do" | 71 | 6 | 495 | 6 | 12 | 4 |
| 6 | Doinița Gherman | "Energy" | 54 | 4 | 869 | 8 | 12 | 4 |
| 7 | Ana Cernicova | "Dragostea divină" | 80 | 8 | 596 | 7 | 15 | 2 |
| 8 | Diana Brescan | "Hallelujah" | 98 | 10 | 235 | 4 | 14 | 3 |
| 9 | Tatiana Heghea | "I'm Yours" | 21 | 0 | 1,046 | 10 | 10 | 7 |
| 10 | Rodica Olișevschi | "Without You" | 23 | 0 | 56 | 0 | 0 | 12 |
| 11 | Paralela 47 | "Fragmente" | 60 | 5 | 123 | 1 | 6 | 8 |
| 12 | Carolina Gorun | "Turn the Tide" | 33 | 1 | 139 | 2 | 3 | 10 |

Detailed Jury Votes
| R/O | Song | A. Calancea | A. Sava | C. Pintilie | T. Postolachi | R. Ţaranu | I. Stepan | N. Ciobanu | A. Chiriac | I. Jeltova | Total |
|---|---|---|---|---|---|---|---|---|---|---|---|
| 1 | "Perfect Day" | 12 | 12 | 11 | 11 | 11 | 11 | 11 | 10 | 9 | 98 |
| 2 | "Never Stop No" | 10 | 9 | 10 | 7 | 5 | 7 | 9 | 9 | 8 | 74 |
| 3 | "Ascultă-mă tăcere" | 7 | 6 | 5 | 3 | 6 | 9 | 3 | 6 | 5 | 50 |
| 4 | "Freedom" | 6 | 4 | 4 | 8 | 8 | 3 | 1 | 3 | 3 | 40 |
| 5 | "The Way I Do" | 5 | 11 | 9 | 6 | 9 | 8 | 4 | 8 | 11 | 71 |
| 6 | "Energy" | 8 | 7 | 7 | 5 | 4 | 2 | 7 | 7 | 7 | 54 |
| 7 | "Dragostea divină" | 4 | 8 | 2 | 10 | 12 | 10 | 12 | 12 | 10 | 80 |
| 8 | "Hallelujah" | 9 | 10 | 12 | 12 | 10 | 12 | 10 | 11 | 12 | 98 |
| 9 | "I'm Yours" | 2 | 2 | 3 | 1 | 1 | 1 | 8 | 1 | 2 | 21 |
| 10 | "Without You" | 3 | 1 | 1 | 4 | 2 | 4 | 2 | 2 | 4 | 23 |
| 11 | "Fragmente" | 11 | 5 | 6 | 9 | 7 | 6 | 5 | 5 | 6 | 60 |
| 12 | "Turn the Tide" | 1 | 3 | 8 | 2 | 3 | 5 | 6 | 4 | 1 | 33 |

Semi-final 2 – 13 March 2014
| R/O | Artist | Song | Jury | | Televote | | Total | Place |
| R/O | Artist | Song | Votes | Points | Votes | Points | Total | Place |
|---|---|---|---|---|---|---|---|---|
| 1 | Cristina Scarlat | "Wild Soul" | 102 | 10 | 554 | 10 | 20 | 1 |
| 2 | Anna Gulko | "Happy Tomorrow" | 45 | 2 | 169 | 3 | 5 | 11 |
| 3 | Curly | "Your Recovery" | 79 | 8 | 497 | 8 | 16 | 3 |
| 4 | Diana Staver | "One and All" | 9 | 0 | 493 | 7 | 7 | 6 |
| 5 | Dana Markitan | "Queen of the Dancefloor" | 53 | 5 | 134 | 1 | 6 | 9 |
| 6 | Aurel Chirtoacă | "Urme de iubiri" | 75 | 7 | 120 | 0 | 7 | 6 |
| 7 | Edict | "Forever" | 47 | 3 | 250 | 5 | 8 | 5 |
| 8 | Margarita Ciorici and Metafora | "Vis" | 43 | 1 | 428 | 6 | 7 | 8 |
| 9 | Lucia S. | "Frozen" | 103 | 12 | 243 | 4 | 16 | 3 |
| 10 | Mikaella | "Follow Your Dreams" | 73 | 6 | 2,126 | 12 | 18 | 2 |
| 11 | Glam Girls | "You Believed In Me" | 49 | 4 | 141 | 2 | 6 | 9 |
| 12 | Lana Lights | "Solar Wind" | 24 | 0 | 41 | 0 | 0 | 12 |

Detailed Jury Votes
| R/O | Song | A. Calancea | A. Sava | C. Pintilie | T. Postolachi | R. Ţaranu | I. Stepan | N. Ciobanu | A. Chiriac | I. Jeltova | Total |
|---|---|---|---|---|---|---|---|---|---|---|---|
| 1 | "Wild Soul" | 12 | 12 | 12 | 11 | 10 | 11 | 11 | 12 | 11 | 102 |
| 2 | "Happy Tomorrow" | 5 | 5 | 5 | 4 | 8 | 4 | 6 | 5 | 3 | 45 |
| 3 | "Your Recovery" | 11 | 10 | 10 | 9 | 6 | 9 | 10 | 6 | 8 | 79 |
| 4 | "One and All" | 1 | 1 | 1 | 1 | 1 | 1 | 1 | 1 | 1 | 9 |
| 5 | "Queen of the Dancefloor" | 9 | 4 | 9 | 8 | 3 | 7 | 7 | 2 | 4 | 53 |
| 6 | "Urme de iubiri" | 7 | 9 | 7 | 10 | 11 | 10 | 8 | 7 | 6 | 75 |
| 7 | "Forever" | 4 | 6 | 6 | 6 | 4 | 3 | 3 | 8 | 7 | 47 |
| 8 | "Vis" | 3 | 2 | 2 | 7 | 5 | 6 | 4 | 9 | 5 | 43 |
| 9 | "Frozen" | 10 | 11 | 11 | 12 | 12 | 12 | 12 | 11 | 12 | 103 |
| 10 | "Follow Your Dreams" | 6 | 8 | 8 | 5 | 9 | 8 | 9 | 10 | 10 | 73 |
| 11 | "You Believed In Me" | 8 | 7 | 4 | 3 | 7 | 2 | 5 | 4 | 9 | 49 |
| 12 | "Solar Wind" | 2 | 3 | 3 | 2 | 2 | 5 | 2 | 3 | 2 | 24 |

==== Final ====
The final took place on 15 March 2014 at TRM Studio 2 in Chișinău, hosted by Iurie Gologan and Olivia Furtună with Vlad Ardovan and Daniela Babici reporting from the green room. The sixteen songs that qualified from the preceding two semi-finals competed and the winner was selected based on the combination of a public televote and the votes of an expert jury. The jury that voted in the final included Mihail Culev (composer), Victoria Bucun (choreographer), Petru Vutcărău (director and actor), Nelly Ciobanu (singer, 2009 Moldovan Eurovision entrant), Tatiana Postolachi (lyricist), Ilona Stepan (conductor), Eugen Negruţă (musician), Liviu Știrbu (composer), Anatol Chiriac (composer), Andrei Sava (composer) and Max Chisaru (composer, lyricist and producer). In addition to the performances of the competing entries, 2013 Moldovan Eurovision entrant Aliona Moon, the ballet company Free Dance and acoustic funk band Cuibul performed as guests. "Wild Soul" performed by Cristina Scarlat was selected as the winner.

Final – 15 March 2014
| R/O | Artist | Song | Jury | | Televote | | Total | Place |
| R/O | Artist | Song | Votes | Points | Votes | Points | Total | Place |
|---|---|---|---|---|---|---|---|---|
| 1 | Diana Staver | "One and All" | 0 | 0 | 459 | 0 | 0 | 14 |
| 2 | Doinița Gherman | "Energy" | 47 | 3 | 1,622 | 6 | 9 | 5 |
| 3 | Boris Covali | "Perfect Day" | 111 | 8 | 11,978 | 12 | 20 | 2 |
| 4 | Tatiana Heghea | "I'm Yours" | 7 | 0 | 1,192 | 3 | 3 | 12 |
| 5 | Lucia S. | "Frozen" | 114 | 10 | 3,048 | 7 | 17 | 3 |
| 6 | Margarita Ciorici and Metafora | "Vis" | 35 | 0 | 433 | 0 | 0 | 14 |
| 7 | Ana Cernicova | "Dragostea divină" | 61 | 6 | 1,220 | 5 | 11 | 4 |
| 8 | Edict | "Forever" | 35 | 0 | 157 | 0 | 0 | 14 |
| 9 | Flux Light | "Never Stop No" | 62 | 7 | 850 | 1 | 8 | 6 |
| 10 | Aurel Chirtoacă | "Urme de iubiri" | 59 | 5 | 162 | 0 | 5 | 8 |
| 11 | Paralela 47 | "Fragmente" | 39 | 1 | 307 | 0 | 1 | 13 |
| 12 | Diana Brescan | "Hallelujah" | 57 | 4 | 636 | 0 | 4 | 9 |
| 13 | Mikaella | "Follow Your Dreams" | 34 | 0 | 3,768 | 8 | 8 | 6 |
| 14 | Curly | "Your Recovery" | 39 | 2 | 950 | 2 | 4 | 9 |
| 15 | Cristina Scarlat | "Wild Soul" | 122 | 12 | 8,305 | 10 | 22 | 1 |
| 16 | Felicia Dunaf | "The Way I Do" | 36 | 0 | 1,197 | 4 | 4 | 9 |

Detailed Jury Votes
| R/O | Song | M. Culev | V. Bucun | P. Vutcărău | N. Ciobanu | T. Postolachi | I. Stepan | E. Negruţă | L. Știrbu | A. Chiriac | A. Sava | M. Chisaru | Total |
|---|---|---|---|---|---|---|---|---|---|---|---|---|---|
| 1 | "One and All" | | | | | | | | | | | | 0 |
| 2 | "Energy" | 9 | | 3 | 6 | 7 | | 9 | 5 | 4 | | 4 | 47 |
| 3 | "Perfect Day" | 7 | 9 | 10 | 10 | 10 | 11 | 11 | 10 | 10 | 11 | 12 | 111 |
| 4 | "I'm Yours" | 5 | | | | 1 | | | | | | 1 | 7 |
| 5 | "Frozen" | 10 | 12 | 12 | 12 | 12 | 10 | 12 | 9 | 8 | 10 | 7 | 114 |
| 6 | "Vis" | 6 | 7 | 7 | | | 1 | 1 | 7 | 6 | | | 35 |
| 7 | "Dragostea divină" | 12 | | 5 | 8 | 2 | 5 | 5 | | 11 | 7 | 6 | 61 |
| 8 | "Forever" | 4 | 2 | | | 4 | | 2 | 8 | 1 | 5 | 9 | 35 |
| 9 | "Never Stop No" | 1 | 5 | 6 | 7 | 6 | 3 | 7 | 2 | 5 | 9 | 11 | 62 |
| 10 | "Urme de iubiri" | 3 | 3 | 4 | 4 | 3 | 9 | 8 | 12 | 2 | 6 | 5 | 59 |
| 11 | "Fragmente" | | 4 | 8 | 2 | 5 | 7 | 6 | 6 | | 1 | | 39 |
| 12 | "Hallelujah" | | 8 | 1 | 9 | 9 | 8 | | 3 | 9 | 8 | 2 | 57 |
| 13 | "Follow Your Dreams" | | 6 | 9 | 1 | | 4 | | | 7 | 4 | 3 | 34 |
| 14 | "Your Recovery" | 2 | 10 | 2 | 5 | 8 | 2 | 3 | 4 | | 3 | | 39 |
| 15 | "Wild Soul" | 11 | 11 | 11 | 11 | 11 | 12 | 10 | 11 | 12 | 12 | 10 | 122 |
| 16 | "The Way I Do" | 8 | 1 | | 3 | | 6 | 4 | 1 | 3 | 2 | 8 | 36 |

=== Promotion ===
Cristina Scarlat made several appearances across Europe to specifically promote "Wild Soul" as the Moldovan Eurovision entry. On 31 March, Cristina Scarlat performed during the Eurovision in Concert event which was held at the Melkweg venue in Amsterdam, Netherlands and hosted by Cornald Maas and Sandra Reemer. On 20 April, Scarlat performed the final version of "Wild Soul", featuring digitally adapted violine and dubstep elements, during the Russian Pre-Party event, which was organised by ESCKAZ and held at the Karlson restaurant in Moscow, Russia.

== At Eurovision ==
Cristina Scarlat presenting herself and "Wild Soul" at the Eurovision Song Contest 2014

According to Eurovision rules, all nations with the exceptions of the host country and the "Big Five" (France, Germany, Italy, Spain and the United Kingdom) are required to qualify from one of two semi-finals in order to compete for the final; the top ten countries from each semi-final progress to the final. The European Broadcasting Union (EBU) split up the competing countries into six different pots based on voting patterns from previous contests, with countries with favourable voting histories put into the same pot. On 20 January 2014, a special allocation draw was held which placed each country into one of the two semi-finals, as well as which half of the show they would perform in. Moldova was placed into the first semi-final, to be held on 6 May 2014, and was scheduled to perform in the second half of the show.

Once all the competing songs for the 2014 contest had been released, the running order for the semi-finals was decided by the shows' producers rather than through another draw, so that similar songs were not placed next to each other. Moldova was set to perform in position 11, following the entry from Belgium and before the entry from San Marino.

The two semi-finals and the final were televised in Moldova on Moldova 1 as well as broadcast via radio on Radio Moldova. All broadcasts featured commentary by Daniela Babici. The Moldovan spokesperson, who announced the Moldovan votes during the final, was Olivia Furtună.

=== Semi-final ===
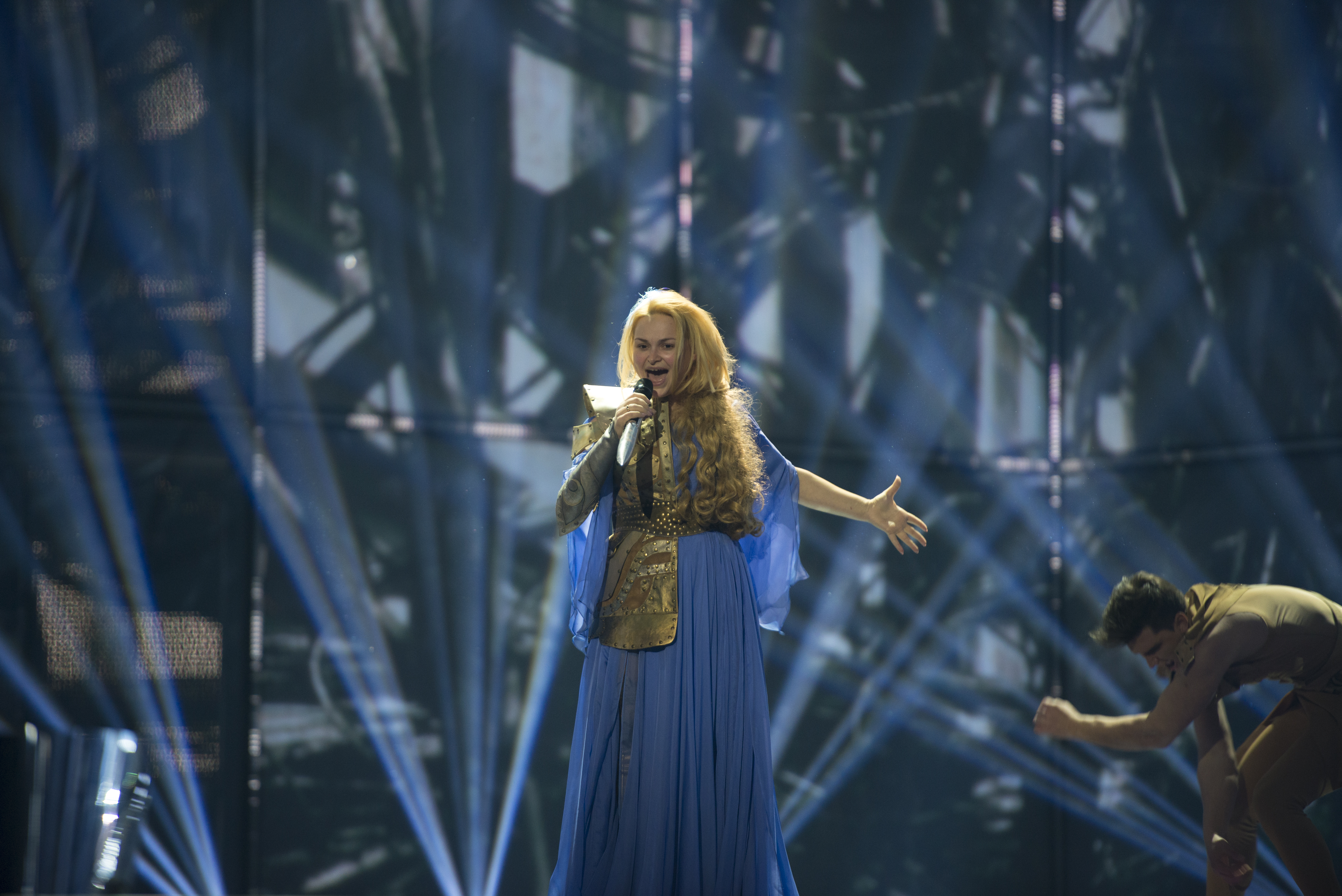
Cristina Scarlat during a rehearsal before the first semi-final

Cristina Scarlat took part in technical rehearsals on 29 April and 2 May, followed by dress rehearsals on 5 and 6 May. This included the jury show on 9 May where the professional juries of each country watched and voted on the competing entries.

The Moldovan performance featured Cristina Scarlat dressed in a vertically split dress in blue and gold, designed by Moldovan designer Janna Berezovskaia, and performing on stage with four dancers dressed as warriors that performed choreography with elements of Samurai fighting. Scarlat also partly wore a wig, which she tore off in the middle of the song accompanied by the use of a wind machine. The stage featured white lighting and LED screen projections of a dark and deep forest with dark green leaves in the beginning, which later transitioned to blossoming red poppy flowers. The four dancers that joined Scarlat on stage are Dragos Hioara, Eugen Simac, Lilian Caraus and Vadim Bianchin.

At the end of the show, Moldova was not announced among the top 10 entries in the first semi-final and therefore failed to qualify to compete in the final. It was later revealed that Moldova placed sixteenth (last) in the semi-final, receiving a total of 13 points.

=== Voting ===
Voting during the three shows consisted of 50 percent public televoting and 50 percent from a jury deliberation. The jury consisted of five music industry professionals who were citizens of the country they represent, with their names published before the contest to ensure transparency. This jury was asked to judge each contestant based on: vocal capacity; the stage performance; the song's composition and originality; and the overall impression by the act. In addition, no member of a national jury could be related in any way to any of the competing acts in such a way that they cannot vote impartially and independently. The individual rankings of each jury member were released shortly after the grand final. In the semi-final, Moldova's vote was based on 100 percent jury voting due to either technical issues with the televoting or an insufficient number of valid votes cast during the televote period.

Following the release of the full split voting by the EBU after the conclusion of the competition, it was revealed that Moldova had placed fifteenth with both the public televote and the jury vote in the first semi-final. In the public vote, Moldova scored 14 points, while with the jury vote, Moldova scored 24 points.

Below is a breakdown of points awarded to Moldova and awarded by Moldova in the first semi-final and grand final of the contest, and the breakdown of the jury voting and televoting conducted during the two shows:

==== Points awarded to Moldova ====
Points awarded to Moldova (Semi-final 1)
| Score | Country |
|---|---|
| 12 points | |
| 10 points | |
| 8 points | |
| 7 points | |
| 6 points | Montenegro |
| 5 points | |
| 4 points | Albania |
| 3 points | |
| 2 points | Ukraine |
| 1 point | Russia |

==== Points awarded by Moldova ====
Points awarded by Moldova (Semi-final 1)
| Score | Country |
|---|---|
| 12 points | Russia |
| 10 points | Sweden |
| 8 points | Ukraine |
| 7 points | Belgium |
| 6 points | Azerbaijan |
| 5 points | Montenegro |
| 4 points | Hungary |
| 3 points | Portugal |
| 2 points | Netherlands |
| 1 point | San Marino |

Points awarded by Moldova (Final)
| Score | Country |
|---|---|
| 12 points | Romania |
| 10 points | Ukraine |
| 8 points | Russia |
| 7 points | Austria |
| 6 points | Sweden |
| 5 points | Belarus |
| 4 points | Hungary |
| 3 points | Armenia |
| 2 points | Poland |
| 1 point | San Marino |

==== Detailed voting results ====
The following members comprised the Moldovan jury:

- Anatol Chiriac (jury chairperson) – composer
- Andrei Tostogan – songwriter, singer, producer
- Tatiana Postolachi – lyricist
- Nelea Ciobanu-Mărgineanu (Nelly Ciobanu) – singer, represented Moldova in the 2009 contest
- Iurie Badicu – songwriter, producer, lyricist

Detailed voting results from Moldova (Semi-final 1)
| R/O | Country | A. Chiriac | A. Tostogan | T. Postolachi | N. Ciobanu | I. Badicu | Jury Rank | Points |
|---|---|---|---|---|---|---|---|---|
| 01 | Armenia | 10 | 12 | 7 | 12 | 13 | 12 | |
| 02 | Latvia | 11 | 15 | 15 | 14 | 14 | 15 | |
| 03 | Estonia | 9 | 11 | 14 | 15 | 15 | 13 | |
| 04 | Sweden | 4 | 3 | 3 | 2 | 6 | 2 | 10 |
| 05 | Iceland | 15 | 14 | 13 | 13 | 11 | 14 | |
| 06 | Albania | 12 | 6 | 12 | 9 | 12 | 11 | |
| 07 | Russia | 1 | 2 | 1 | 1 | 1 | 1 | 12 |
| 08 | Azerbaijan | 5 | 9 | 4 | 3 | 3 | 5 | 6 |
| 09 | Ukraine | 2 | 4 | 6 | 4 | 4 | 3 | 8 |
| 10 | Belgium | 3 | 5 | 2 | 6 | 7 | 4 | 7 |
| 11 | Moldova | | | | | | | |
| 12 | San Marino | 13 | 10 | 11 | 8 | 8 | 10 | 1 |
| 13 | Portugal | 6 | 13 | 9 | 5 | 9 | 8 | 3 |
| 14 | Netherlands | 14 | 7 | 8 | 10 | 10 | 9 | 2 |
| 15 | Montenegro | 7 | 8 | 5 | 7 | 5 | 6 | 5 |
| 16 | Hungary | 8 | 1 | 10 | 11 | 2 | 7 | 4 |

Detailed voting results from Moldova (Final)
| R/O | Country | A. Chiriac | A. Tostogan | T. Postolachi | N. Ciobanu | I. Badicu | Jury Rank | Televote Rank | Combined Rank | Points |
|---|---|---|---|---|---|---|---|---|---|---|
| 01 | Ukraine | 4 | 4 | 3 | 4 | 5 | 3 | 3 | 2 | 10 |
| 02 | Belarus | 12 | 14 | 8 | 12 | 6 | 8 | 7 | 6 | 5 |
| 03 | Azerbaijan | 7 | 5 | 9 | 7 | 9 | 7 | 18 | 13 | |
| 04 | Iceland | 24 | 23 | 26 | 19 | 24 | 26 | 25 | 26 | |
| 05 | Norway | 21 | 18 | 14 | 24 | 15 | 20 | 15 | 19 | |
| 06 | Romania | 1 | 1 | 1 | 1 | 1 | 1 | 1 | 1 | 12 |
| 07 | Armenia | 9 | 21 | 11 | 25 | 10 | 15 | 5 | 8 | 3 |
| 08 | Montenegro | 25 | 13 | 24 | 16 | 16 | 21 | 26 | 24 | |
| 09 | Poland | 10 | 22 | 17 | 18 | 4 | 12 | 8 | 9 | 2 |
| 10 | Greece | 11 | 25 | 23 | 11 | 11 | 16 | 14 | 16 | |
| 11 | Austria | 3 | 9 | 4 | 2 | 3 | 4 | 4 | 4 | 7 |
| 12 | Germany | 13 | 7 | 6 | 14 | 17 | 9 | 20 | 15 | |
| 13 | Sweden | 2 | 3 | 2 | 3 | 7 | 2 | 6 | 5 | 6 |
| 14 | France | 14 | 26 | 25 | 26 | 18 | 25 | 23 | 25 | |
| 15 | Russia | 5 | 6 | 5 | 8 | 8 | 6 | 2 | 3 | 8 |
| 16 | Italy | 20 | 24 | 20 | 23 | 19 | 24 | 19 | 21 | |
| 17 | Slovenia | 19 | 17 | 21 | 20 | 20 | 22 | 21 | 22 | |
| 18 | Finland | 26 | 16 | 22 | 21 | 13 | 23 | 22 | 23 | |
| 19 | Spain | 16 | 15 | 7 | 6 | 25 | 10 | 16 | 14 | |
| 20 | Switzerland | 15 | 8 | 10 | 13 | 26 | 13 | 10 | 11 | |
| 21 | Hungary | 6 | 2 | 12 | 5 | 2 | 5 | 12 | 7 | 4 |
| 22 | Malta | 17 | 19 | 13 | 17 | 23 | 18 | 24 | 20 | |
| 23 | Denmark | 22 | 10 | 15 | 15 | 21 | 17 | 17 | 18 | |
| 24 | Netherlands | 18 | 20 | 16 | 10 | 12 | 14 | 11 | 12 | |
| 25 | San Marino | 8 | 12 | 18 | 9 | 22 | 11 | 9 | 10 | 1 |
| 26 | United Kingdom | 23 | 11 | 19 | 22 | 14 | 19 | 13 | 17 | |
