= Moldova in the Eurovision Song Contest 2009 =

- Eurovision Song Contest 2009
- Participating broadcaster: TeleRadio-Moldova (TRM)
- Country: Moldova
- Selection process: O melodie pentru Europa 2009
- Selection date: 14 February 2009

Competing entry
- Song: "Hora din Moldova"
- Artist: Nelly Ciobanu
- Songwriters: Veaceslav Daniliuc; Andrei Hadjiu; Nelly Ciobanu; Aristotelis Kalimeris

Placement
- Semi-final result: Qualified (5th, 106 points)
- Final result: 14th, 69 points

Participation chronology

Moldova was represented at the Eurovision Song Contest 2009 with the song "Hora din Moldova" written by Veaceslav Daniliuc, Andrei Hadjiu, Nelly Ciobanu, and Aristotelis Kalimeris, and performed by Nelly Ciobanu. The Moldovan participating broadcaster, TeleRadio-Moldova (TRM), organised the national final O melodie pentru Europa 2009 in order to select its entry for the contest. 39 entries competed to represent Moldova, with 20 being shortlisted to participate in the televised national final which took place on 14 February 2009. "Hora din Moldova" performed by Nelly Ciobanu emerged as the winner after gaining the most points following the combination of votes from a jury panel, a committee and a public televote.

Moldova was drawn to compete in the second semi-final of the Eurovision Song Contest which took place on 14 May 2009. Performing during the show in position 15, "Hora din Moldova" was announced among the 10 qualifying entries of the second semi-final and therefore qualified to compete in the final on 16 May. It was later revealed that Moldova placed fifth out of the 19 participating countries in the semi-final with 106 points. In the final, Moldova performed in position 13 and placed fourteenth out of the 25 participating countries, scoring 69 points.

== Background ==
Prior to the 2009 contest, TeleRadio-Moldova (TRM) had participated in the Eurovision Song Contest representing Moldova four times since its first entry in 2005. Its best placing in the contest was sixth, achieved in 2005 with the song "Boonika bate doba" performed by Zdob și Zdub. Other than its debut entry, to this point, its only other top ten placing at the contest was achieved in 2007 with "Fight" performed by Natalia Barbu placing tenth. In 2008, "A Century of Love" performed by Geta Burlacu failed to qualify to the final.

As part of its duties as participating broadcaster, TRM organises the selection of its entry in the Eurovision Song Contest and broadcasts the event in the country. The broadcaster confirmed its intentions to participate at the 2009 contest on 13 November 2008. TRM has selected its entry via a national selection show since 2008, a procedure that was continued for its 2009 participation.

== Before Eurovision ==
=== O melodie pentru Europa 2009 ===
O melodie pentru Europa 2009 was the national final format developed by TRM in order to select its entry for the Eurovision Song Contest 2009. The event took place at the Theatre of Opera and Ballet in Chişinău, hosted by Rusalina Rusu and Serj Kuzenkoff, and included a final to be held on 14 February 2009. The show was broadcast on Moldova 1, TV Moldova Internațional and Radio Moldova as well as online via TRM's official website trm.md.

==== Competing entries ====
Artists and composers had the opportunity to submit their entries between 10 November 2008 to 20 December 2008. Artists were required to be of Moldovan nationality and could submit more than one song, while songwriters could hold any nationality. At the conclusion of the submission deadline, 39 valid entries were received by the broadcaster. A nine-member jury consisting of composers, lyricists, producers and singers selected 20 finalists out of the 39 received entries, which were announced on 9 January 2009. On 7 February 2009, "So Alive" performed by 2006 Moldovan Eurovision entrant Natalia Gordienko, "Run Away" performed by Edict and "Love Is in the Air" performed by Olia Tira were withdrawn from the competition and replaced with the songs "Hei! Exploadează!" performed by Doiniţa Gherman, "Lerui - ler" performed by Veronica Stolli and "7 Days" performed by Corbus Albus.

Artist	Song	Songwriter(s)
Alexa	"A Flight to the Light"	Alexandru Brașoveanu, Vica Demici
Anişoara Balmuş	"Adrenalina"	Viorel Burlacu
Ayra	"Call Me a Liar"	Ayra, Eugenia Rubiovscaia
Brand	"Simt că este timpul"	Marian Stîrcea, Ianus Țurcanu
Cezara	"Tu, tată"	Marian Stîrcea, Radmila Popovici-Paraschiv
Corbus Albus	"7 Days"	Denis Andreev, Anna Constatinova
Cristina Croitor	"First Chance"	Cristina Croitor, Alina Dabija
Cristy Rouge	"Women's Winner"	Alexandru Gorgos, Cristina Rujitcaia
Dana Marchitan	"Doar un pas"	Ion Lincovschi, Radmila Popovici-Paraschiv
Dianna	"I'm Missing You"	Dianna Rotaru
Doiniţa Gherman	"Hei! Exploadează!"	Doiniţa Gherman
Elena Buga	"Queen"	Ilie Gorincioi (Tadevs), Elena Buga
Galina Şcoda	"Joc de noroc"	Marian Stîrcea, Radmila Popovici-Paraschiv
Katalina Rusu	"Sparky Lady"	Alexandru Brașoveanu, Alina Dabija
Marius	"We'll Gonna Rock"	Marius
Nelly Ciobanu	"Hora din Moldova"	Veaceslav Daniliuc, Nelly Ciobanu, Andrei Hadjiu
Olia Tira	"Unicul meu"	Ruslan Țăranu
Slavici	"O fată cu părul de aur"	Veaceslav Moroz, Petru Botezatu
SunStroke Project	"No Crime"	Pavel Parfeni, Ion Zancovschi
Veronika Stolli	"Lerui - ler"	Veronica Stolli

==== Final ====
The final took place on 14 February 2009. Twenty songs competed and the winner was selected based on the combination of a public televote, the votes of an expert jury and the votes of a committee consisting of TRM and Orange Moldova representatives. The jury that voted in the final included Anatol Chiriac (composer), Aurelian Dănilă (President of the Theatre Union of Moldova), Vsevolod Cernei (journalist), Sorin Bucătaru (television producer), Doina Ţurcanu (President of the National Youth Council of Moldova), Natalia Brasnuev (President of OGAE Moldova), Vlad Mircos (composer) and Iurie Matei (painter), while the committee included Jerome Poulain (marketing, communication and sales director of Orange Moldova), Marcel Spătaru (TRM representative of television) and Lucia Danu (TRM representative of television). In addition to the performances of the competing entries, 2009 Romanian Eurovision entrant Elena Gheorghe and singer Ionel Istrati performed as guests, while 2009 Azerbaijani Eurovision entrant AySel appeared during the show and premiered a teaser of the 2009 Azerbaijani entry "Always". "Hora din Moldova" performed by Nelly Ciobanu was selected as the winner.

Final – 14 February 2009
R/O	Artist	Song	Jury	Committee	Televote		Total	Place
R/O	Artist	Song	Jury	Committee	Percentage	Points	Total	Place
1	Doiniţa Gherman	"Hei! Exploadează!"	0	6	3%	7	13	8
2	Corbus Albus	"7 Days"	0	7	1%	5	12	10
3	Veronica Stolli	"Lerui - ler"	0	0	0%	0	0	20
4	Cristy Rouge	"Women's Winner"	2	7	2%	6	15	6
5	Elena Buga	"Queen"	0	4	1%	5	9	14
6	Cristina Croitor	"First Chance"	3	1	1%	5	9	15
7	Galina Şcoda	"Joc de noroc"	4	6	1%	5	15	7
8	Ayra	"Call Me a Liar"	5	2	1%	5	12	11
9	SunStroke Project	"No Crime"	8	10	7%	8	26	3
10	Marius	"We'll Gonna Rock"	0	0	2%	6	6	18
11	Brand	"Simt că este timpul"	1	2	1%	5	8	16
12	Dana Marchitan	"Doar un pas"	0	3	1%	5	8	17
13	Dianna	"I'm Missing You"	0	7	1%	5	12	12
14	Olia Tira	"Unicul meu"	10	8	2%	6	24	4
15	Anişoara Balmuş	"Adrenalina"	0	0	1%	5	5	19
16	Cezara	"Tu, tată"	4	1	2%	6	11	13
17	Slavici	"O fată cu părul de aur"	3	5	1%	5	13	9
18	Katalina Rusu	"Sparky Lady"	6	8	2%	6	20	5
19	Alexa	"A Flight to the Light"	7	10	9%	10	27	2
20	Nelly Ciobanu	"Hora din Moldova"	12	12	61%	12	36	1

=== Preparation ===
Following the national final, it was revealed that "Hora din Moldova" would be performed bilingually in Romanian and English at the contest, the latter of which was written by Aristotelis Kalimeris. The final version of the song together with the official music video premiered on 27 March.

=== Promotion ===
Nelly Ciobanu made several appearances across Europe to specifically promote "Hora din Moldova" as the Moldovan Eurovision entry. On 18 April, Nelly Ciobanu performed during the Eurovision Promo Concert, which was held at the Amsterdam Marcanti venue in Amsterdam, Netherlands and hosted by Marga Bult and Maggie MacNeal. On 18 and 19 April, Ciobanu took part in promotional activities in Belgium and performed during an event held at the Place Sainte-Catherine/Sint-Katelijneplein in Brussels. Nelly Ciobanu also took part in promotional activities in Romania where she was a guest during programmes on Antena 1 and Pro TV.

== At Eurovision ==
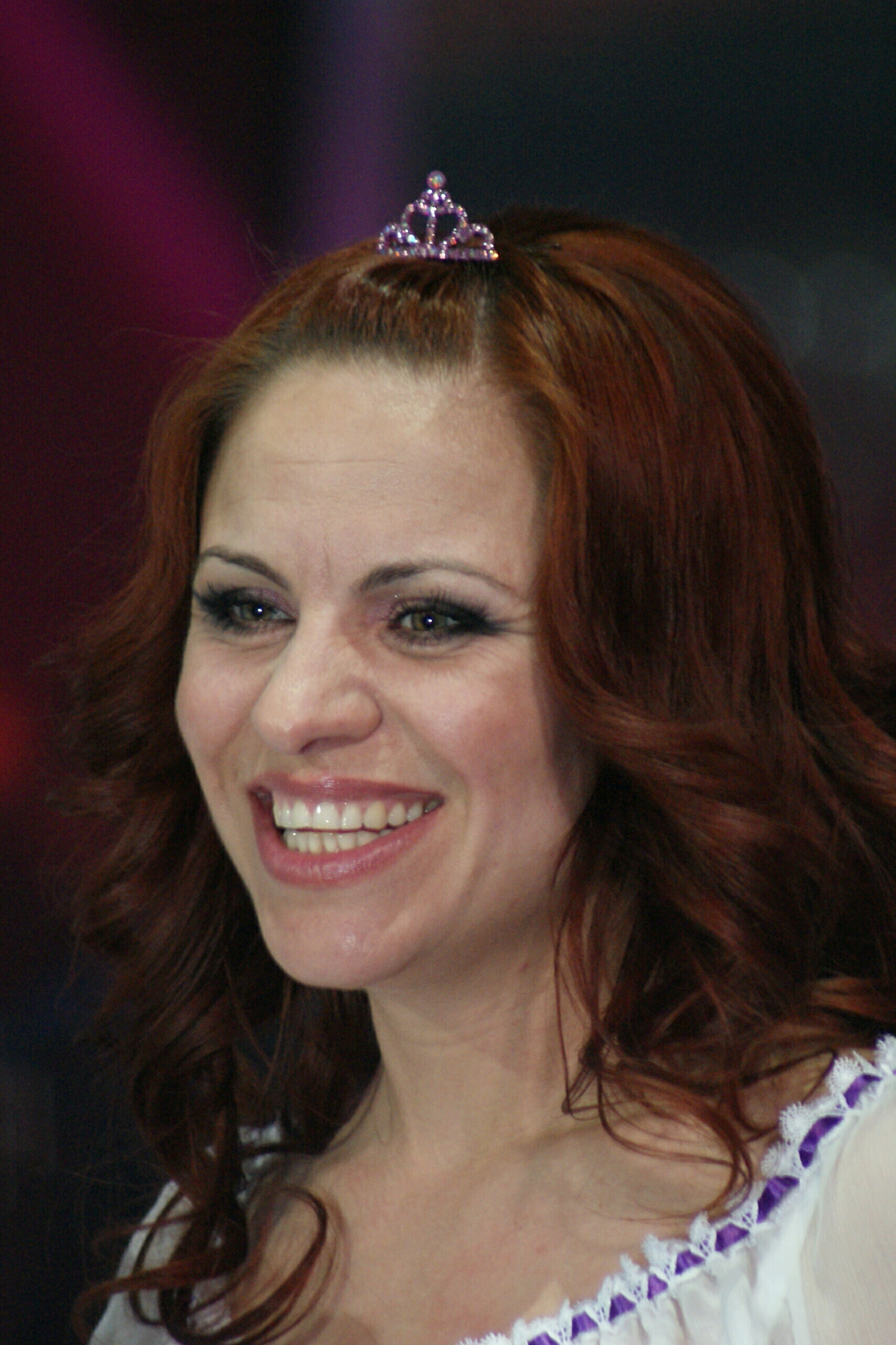
Nelly Ciobanu at the Eurovision Song Contest 2009

According to Eurovision rules, all nations with the exceptions of the host country and the "Big Four" (France, Germany, Spain and the United Kingdom) are required to qualify from one of two semi-finals in order to compete for the final; the top nine songs from each semi-final as determined by televoting progress to the final, and a tenth was determined by back-up juries. The European Broadcasting Union (EBU) split up the competing countries into six different pots based on voting patterns from previous contests, with countries with favourable voting histories put into the same pot. On 30 January 2009, a special allocation draw was held which placed each country into one of the two semi-finals. Moldova was placed into the second semi-final, to be held on 14 May 2009. The running order for the semi-finals was decided through another draw on 16 March 2009 and Moldova was set to perform in position 15, following the entry from Lithuania and before the entry from Albania.

The two semi-finals and the final were televised in Moldova on Moldova 1 and TV Moldova Internațional. All broadcasts featured commentary by Rusalina Rusu and Andrei Sava. The Moldovan spokesperson, who announced the Moldovan votes during the final, was 2008 Moldova Eurovision representative Geta Burlacu.

=== Semi-final ===
Nelly Ciobanu took part in technical rehearsals on 6 and 10 May, followed by dress rehearsals on 13 and 14 May. The Moldovan performance featured Ciobanu dressed in a short white dress with a green pinafore and purple embroidered flowers as well as purple boots, and performing on stage with four dancers and a backing vocalist who waved a wooden stick with colourful ribbons attached to its top, all of them which were dressed in national costumes. The stage featured LED screen projections of embroidery patterns and a stylized dancing couple in front of a black background. The backing vocalist that joined Nelly Ciobanu on stage is Gicu Cimbir.

At the end of the show, Moldova was announced as having finished in the top ten and subsequently qualifying for the grand final. It was later revealed that Moldova placed fifth in the semi-final, receiving a total of 106 points.

=== Final ===
Shortly after the second semi-final, a winners' press conference was held for the ten qualifying countries. As part of this press conference, the qualifying artists took part in a draw to determine the running order for the final. This draw was done in the order the countries appeared in the semi-final running order. Moldova was drawn to perform in position 12, following the entry from Bosnia and Herzegovina and before the entry from Malta.

Nelly Ciobanu once again took part in dress rehearsals on 15 and 16 May before the final, including the jury final where the professional juries cast their final votes before the live show. Ciobanu performed a repeat of her semi-final performance during the final on 16 May. At the conclusion of the voting, Moldova finished in fourteenth place with 69 points.

=== Voting ===
The voting system for 2009 involved each country awarding points from 1–8, 10 and 12, with the points in the final being decided by a combination of 50% national jury and 50% televoting. Each nation's jury consisted of five music industry professionals who are citizens of the country they represent. This jury judged each entry based on: vocal capacity; the stage performance; the song's composition and originality; and the overall impression by the act. In addition, no member of a national jury was permitted to be related in any way to any of the competing acts in such a way that they cannot vote impartially and independently.

Following the release of the full split voting by the EBU after the conclusion of the competition, it was revealed that Moldova had placed thirteenth with the public televote and tenth with the jury vote in the final. In the public vote, Moldova scored 66 points, while with the jury vote, Moldova scored 93 points.

Below is a breakdown of points awarded to Moldova and awarded by Moldova in the second semi-final and grand final of the contest. The nation awarded its 12 points to Azerbaijan in the semi-final and to Romania in the final of the contest.

==== Points awarded to Moldova ====
Points awarded to Moldova (Semi-final 2)
Score	Country
12 points	
10 points	Norway
8 points	Russia; Spain; Ukraine
7 points	Azerbaijan; Cyprus; France; Serbia; Slovakia
6 points	Greece
5 points	Croatia; Hungary; Ireland; Poland
4 points	Netherlands
3 points	Slovenia
2 points	Estonia; Latvia
1 point	

Points awarded to Moldova (Final)
Score	Country
12 points	Portugal; Romania
10 points	
8 points	
7 points	Azerbaijan; Turkey; Ukraine
6 points	
5 points	Poland; Spain
4 points	Belgium
3 points	Croatia; Norway
2 points	Armenia
1 point	Israel; Russia

==== Points awarded by Moldova ====
Points awarded by Moldova (Semi-final 2)
Score	Country
12 points	Azerbaijan
10 points	Norway
8 points	Ukraine
7 points	Estonia
6 points	Greece
5 points	Albania
4 points	Lithuania
3 points	Croatia
2 points	Ireland
1 point	Poland

Points awarded by Moldova (Final)
Score	Country
12 points	Romania
10 points	Azerbaijan
8 points	Norway
7 points	Estonia
6 points	Russia
5 points	Denmark
4 points	Ukraine
3 points	Iceland
2 points	Croatia
1 point	United Kingdom

==== Detailed voting results ====
Detailed voting results from Moldova (Final)
R/O	Country	Results			Points
R/O	Country	Jury	Televoting	Combined	Points
01	Lithuania	1		1	
02	Israel				
03	France	2		2	
04	Sweden				
05	Croatia	3	1	4	2
06	Portugal				
07	Iceland		4	4	3
08	Greece		2	2	
09	Armenia				
10	Russia	5	7	12	6
11	Azerbaijan	10	10	20	10
12	Bosnia and Herzegovina				
13	Moldova				
14	Malta				
15	Estonia	8	6	14	7
16	Denmark	6		6	5
17	Germany				
18	Turkey		3	3	
19	Albania				
20	Norway	7	8	15	8
21	Ukraine		5	5	4
22	Romania	12	12	24	12
23	United Kingdom	4		4	1
24	Finland				
25	Spain				
