= Moldova are talent =

- Created by: Simon Cowell
- Presented by: Adrian Ursu; Mircea Marco
- Judges: Mihai Muntean; Tania Cerga; Nicu Țărnă
- Country of origin: Moldova
- No. of seasons: 2
- No. of episodes: 12

Production
- Running time: 180–240 minutes

Original release
- Network: Prime
- Release: 11 October 2013 – 26 December 2014

Moldova are talent ("Moldova's got Talent") is a TV show which first aired on 11 October 2013. The project is a franchise of Got Talent, developed by Simco Limited. The hosts of the show are Adrian Ursu and Mircea Marco. The judges are a well known Moldovan opera singer, Mihai Muntean, the Moldovan singer Tania Cerga, a Moldovan singer (vocalist of Gândul Mâței band), Prime TV star and presenter Nicu Țărnă. The grand prize of first serie is 500,000 MDL.

== Format ==
The auditions take place between May and June 2013, in front of the judges and a live audience at different cities across the Moldova: Nisporeni, Bălți, Constanța, Drochia, Soroca, Edineț, Orhei, Cahul, Comrat, Ungheni, Hâncești, Căușeni and Chișinău. The main contest take place in Chișinău, capital of Moldova. At any time during the contest, the judges may show disapproval to the act by pressing a buzzer which lights a large red "X" on the stage, indicating that they particularly dislike the act and do not wish the performance to continue. If all the judges press their buzzers, the act must end immediately.

First episode was on 11 October 2013. Contest has 2 semi-finals, from each semi-final 7 participants qualifying for the final that took place on 27 December 2013. On first place with a prize of 500,000 lei won Monica Pîrlici, a 10 years old girl ani recited an emotional poetry "Nimic nu sunt" ("I am nothing"), written by Romanian bard Costache Ioanid. and second place – dancers team "Maximum".

== Season two ==
At the end of first season final, presenters Mircea Marco and Adrian Ursu announced that soon will begin the preparations for the second season of show. Preselections took place in spring-summer of 2014, and auditions of the 2nd season began on 19 September 2014. In telecast of 28 November, auditions phase ended and took place jury deliberations in which was selected the 36 semi-finalists. The three semifinals took place on 5, 12, and 19 December, and from each semifinal promoted in top 4 participants. In the final, on 26 December 2014, on first place and the winner became Ana Munteanu, a 13 years teen, who in the final sung Patricia's Kaas – "Il parle d'amour", and in previous phases – two songs of Vladimir Vystsky. and on second place speedcuber Roberto Lozovanu.

== Partners and sponsors ==
General partner of contest is Moldovan telecommunication company Moldcell.

== Series summary ==
Series	Start	Finish	Winner	Runner-up	Host(s)	Judges	Sponsor
One	11 October 2013	27 December 2013	Monica Pîrlici	group "Maximum"	Adrian Ursu; Mircea Marco	Mihai Muntean Tania Cerga Nicu Țărnă	Moldcell
Two	19 September 2014	26 December 2014	Ana Munteanu	Roberto Lozovanu	Adrian Ursu; Mircea Marco	Mihai Muntean Tania Cerga Nicu Țărnă	Moldcell
