= Praga Backyard Band Memorial =

Sculpture in Warsaw, Poland

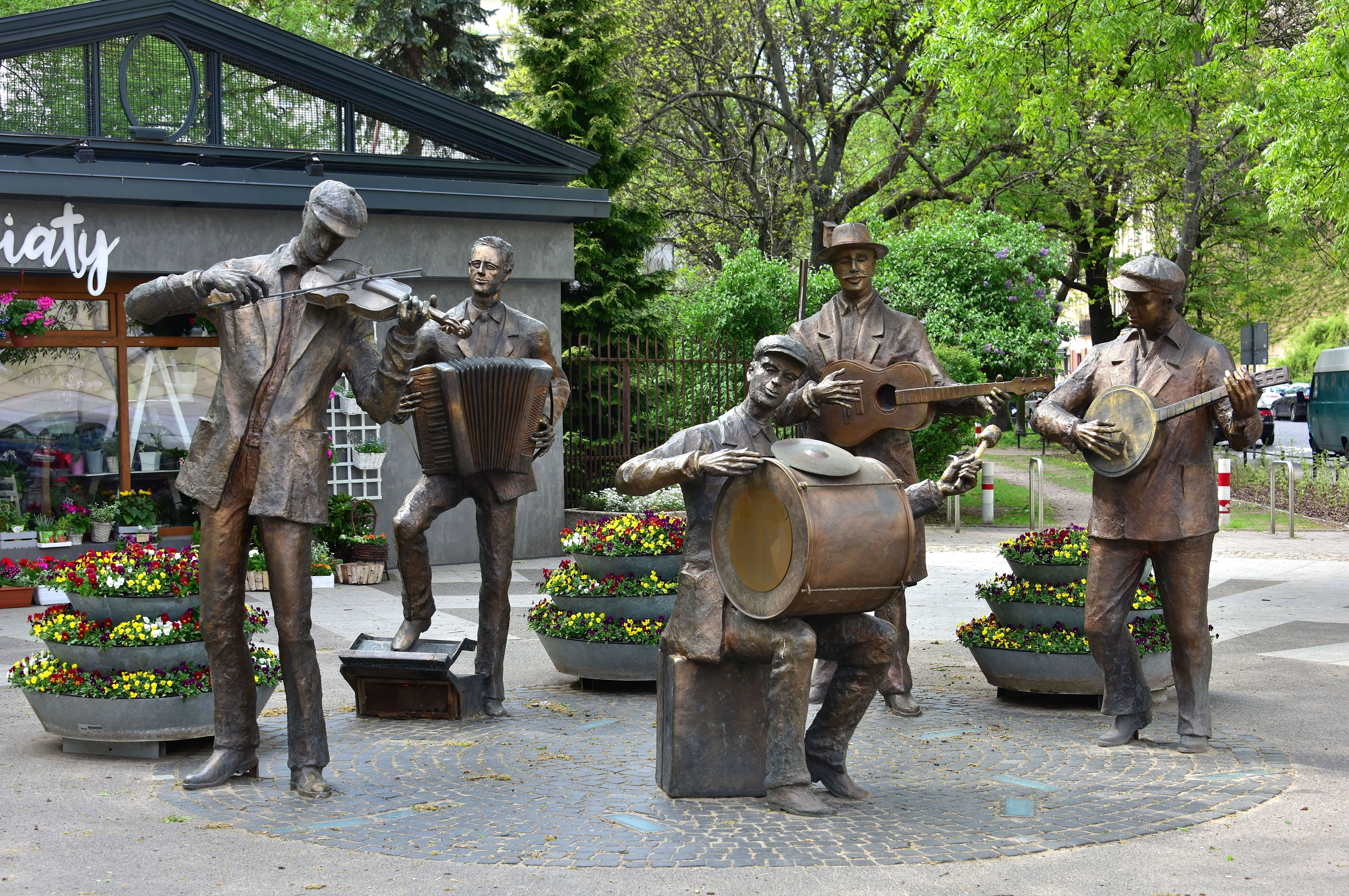
- The sculpture in 2018.
- Interactive map of Praga Backyard Band Memorial
- Location: Floriańska Street, Praga-North, Warsaw, Poland
- Coordinates: 52°15′06″N 21°02′03″E
- Designer: Andrzej Renes
- Type: Statue
- Material: Brass
- Opening date: 17 September 2006

The Praga Backyard Band Memorial (Polish: Pomnik Praskiej Kapeli Podwórkowej) is a monument in Warsaw, Poland, within the Praga-North district. It is located at the corner of Floriańska and Kłopotowskiego Streets, in the neighbourhood of Old Praga. The monument consists of four brass statues depicting members of a Warsaw folk band, including a violinist, accordionist, guitarist, banjoist and drummer. It was designed by Andrzej Renes, and was unveiled on 17 September 2006.

== History ==
The monument depicts folk musicians from Warsaw. It was proposed by Sławoj Leszek Głódź, the bishop of Warsaw-Praga, following him receiving the honorary citizenship of Warsaw, to commemorate the city's residents. It was financed by donations collected from the local residents. The monument, made from brass, was designed by sculptor Andrzej Renes, and was unveiled on 17 September 2006.

The monument was fitted with a music player with a liblary of one hundred songs, which could have been selected via a SMS message. Its collection primarily consisted of Warsaw folk songs and Polish patriotic songs from the Second World War. The system was turned off in 2013, after suffering a malfunction.

== Characteristics ==
The monument is placed at the corner of Floriańska and Kłopotowskiego Streets, and consists of four brass statues depicting members of a Warsaw folk band, including a violinist, accordionist, guitarist, banjoist and drummer. Previously, from 2006 to 2013, the art installation was fitted with a music player with a library of one hundred songs, which could have been selected via a SMS message. Its collection primarily consisted of Warsaw folk songs and Polish patriotic songs from the Second World War.

== Gallery ==
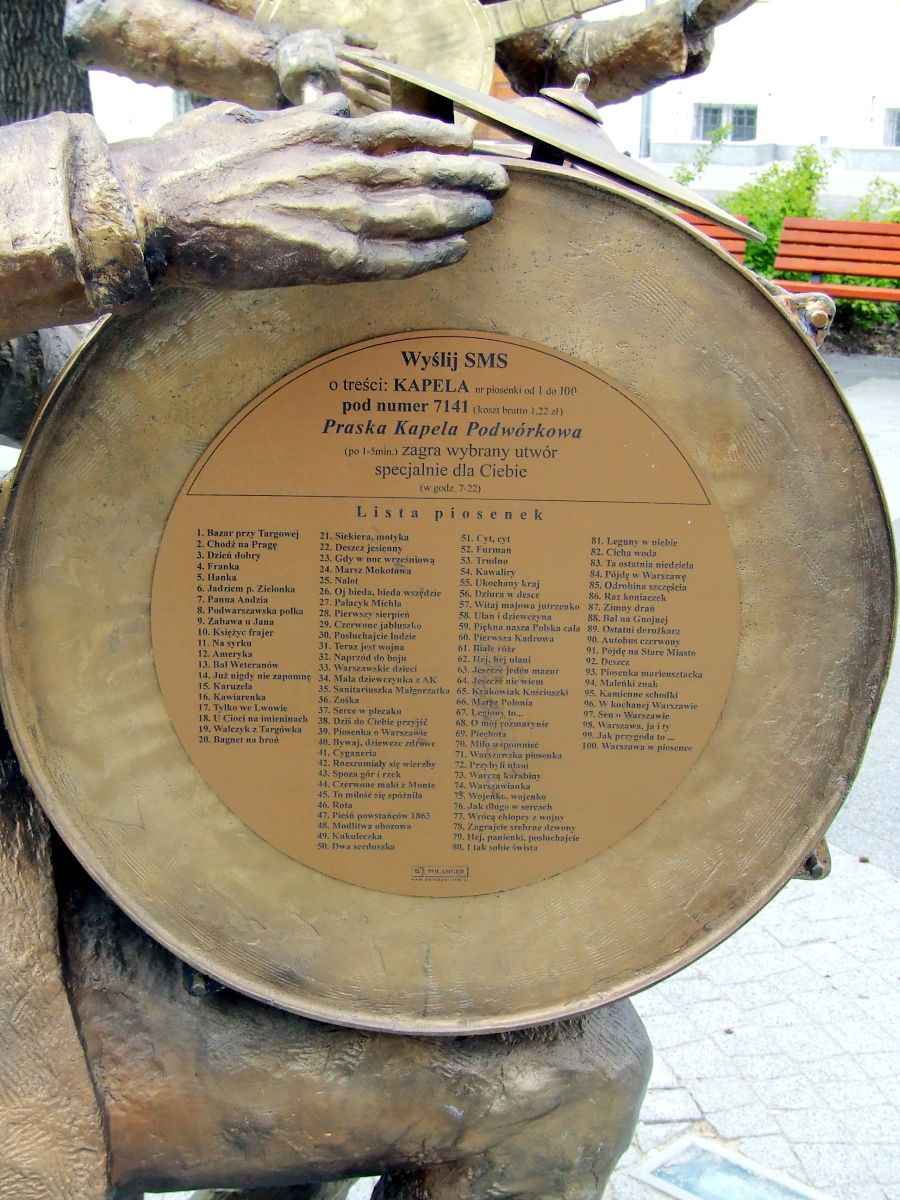
A plaque with a list of songs, which previously could have been played by a device installed in the monument.
