= Cuibul =

Cuibul are an crossover funk-rock band from Chișinău, Moldova. Igor Dinga, founder and initial vocalist of the band formed the band in 1991 as a rock'n'roll funk fusion band. The band released 6 albums from 1991 to 2001, and their musical style changed from rock'n'roll to acoustic mellow funk with chillout and Latino influences.

Cuibul is widely regarded as an important contributor to the Moldovan live music scene. They are the oldest band from Moldova which is currently active.

== History ==
=== 1990s ===
During their first 10 years, the band released 6 albums and 7 music videos. Cuibul's concert activity was most intense from 1991 to 1995 and between 1998 and 2001, when the album Po-mid'or (meaning "tomato" in Russian) was released. Throughout these years, Cuibul's activity geographically spread through Russia.

Igor Dinga is a Russian-speaking songwriter, also director of the Moldovan ethno-rock band Zdob și Zdub. The first two Cuibul albums were released together with the Moscow-based labels Feelee Records and CD Land Records. Despite the fact that the band's music was too experimental for the Russian mainstream market, some of the tracks proved successful. The singles "Muzika Letneaya" and "Igra v duraka" hit the MTV Russia TOP 20 charts and the music video for "Muzika Letneaya" was recognized among the 100 best Russian music videos of 1998. The single "Kolybelnaya" hit the rotation on popular radio stations such as Nashe Radio and Russkoe Radio, while the funky single "Pomidor" reached TOP 10 on Europa Plus. To continue the musical activity in Russia, the band members would have had to move to Moscow and promote themselves on the spot. However, the musicians were not ready for such a serious change. In addition, Russia faced a harsh financial crisis in 1998 and FEELEE Records minimized their activity and support.

=== 2000s ===
In December 2001, Cuibul recorded and launched the album Klyuchi ot vannoy (trans: "Bathroom keys").

Between 2003 and 2008, the band was inactive.

In 2007, the saxophonist Igor Kosholyan returned to Moldova from the Netherlands and the drummer Vadim Tichisan returns from Bucharest, Romania. Because of this, Cuibul resumed their activity. For one year, the musicians rehearsed and searched for a new sound. The new format was composed of Igor Kosholyan as a guitar player, Vadim Tichisan for drums, Andrei Boico as the bass player and Igor Dinga as frontman guitarist and vocalist. At the end of 2009, Cuibul launched 13 tracks under the album PRiZ (abbreviation for "Proshay i Zdrastvuy", meaning "Goodbye and Welcome"). In February 2010, Cuibul released a new music video for the album single "Proshay i Zdrastvuy", followed by a music video for "Ruchka Usilka" which featured a cameo of Muz-TV Russia's presenter Rita Chelmakova.

=== 2010s ===
In 2010, Cuibul's concert activity was ongoing in Moldova, Russia and Ukraine. PRiZ was released in Russia together with the label Soyuz Music and in Ukraine with Hitlab/Moon Records. In 2011, Cuibul toured through Western Europe. They also participated at the EuroSonic Festival in Groningen, Netherlands.

By the end of 2011, Cuibul released a new music video for the song "Nebo ne Voda", filmed in St. Petersburg together with the director Pavel Vladimirskyi. In December 2011, Cuibul celebrated their 20th anniversary through a grand concert starring guests such as Alexandr F. Sklyar, Serghei Galanin, Zorge, Zdob si Zdub, O Chad.

== The rebirth of the band ==
The band planned to extend itself to the Romanian music market and Igor Dinga decided to search for a young female vocalist with Romanian language skills. After a long search, at the end of 2012 Lidia Scarlat joined Cuibul. She was a film producer and first class Media Arts graduate of the Royal Holloway, University of London. Born into an artistic family, from her early years she participated successfully in various national and international music competitions. Lidia worked in radio and television, presenting the famous TV show for children “De la 5 la 10” at TeleRadio-Moldova. In her university years she was the lead singer of the university's Jazz Big Band. Lidia made her debut in Cuibul in late December 2012 at a Christmas concert of the band where she performed 4 songs. One week later, she sang for an audience of thousands of people at the New Year concert “I love Moscow”, held in the heart of the Russian capital.

The band was also joined by a new drummer – Jenea Berdea. Jenea had played in various bands, including ExNN, Alternosfera, Headswitch, Millenium, Gândul Mâței. Currently, he performs in some musical projects like All Four Seasons, Whynona Ryderz, Ramzes Project, Doll.

In 2013, Cuibul changed their sound, combining acoustic guitars, acoustic bass, violin, cajón and percussion. Lidia Scarlat chose the most suitable songs from the existing repertoire and adapted the lyrics in Romanian and English. Lidia wrote the lyrics for the new single "Nu contează" in two versions : Romanian and English (the English version of the song is titled "Hello"). Lidia Scarlat performed a track list consisting of over 10 songs. The band's performances now feature two vocalists including Igori Dinga.

The new format of the band received mixed feedback from its old fans while new audiences largely supported it. The band resumed its concert activity and performed at several international music festivals such as "Dikaya Myata" in Russia and "Folk You!" in Romania.

In summer 2013, the band released three videos from a studio acoustic session and started recording a new album.

On 4 December 2013 Cuibul opened the concert for the Swedish band The Cardigans in Moscow, at GlavClub. On 1 March 2014 Cuibul opened for the British band Morcheeba at the same concert venue. Both performances received excellent press feedback. Before opening the concert for Morcheeba, Cuibul performed 7 songs at the art TV-show "Kozyrev Live" on Телеканал Дождь (TV Rain, Moscow). In March 2014, Cuibul had the last recording session for the new album in Moscow and recorded the last three songs from the new album at the studio of Yurii Bogdanov.

In June 2014, Cuibul shot a music video for "Nu Conteaza" in Bucharest, directed by Vlad Gliga. Currently, the band is producing a new album, working on the newest version of their official website and preparing for the launch of the music video.

== Discography ==
- 1992 – Первые песни – Лучшие песни! (translated as "First songs – Best songs!")
- 1992 – Люди, как птицы – Прыгайте В Воду (translated as "People, as birds – Jump in the water")
- 1994 – Ломайте ветки, Ломайте палки (translated as "Break the branches, break the sticks")
- 1995 – Icare
- 1998 – По-мид'ор (Po-mid'or)
- 2001 – Ключи от ванной (translated as "Bathroom keys")
- 2010 – ПриЗ (Priz)
- 2015 – Vise Elementare (translated as "Elementary Dreams")
- 2024 - Vamos!
