= Nicu Țărnă =

Moldovan actor (born 1977)

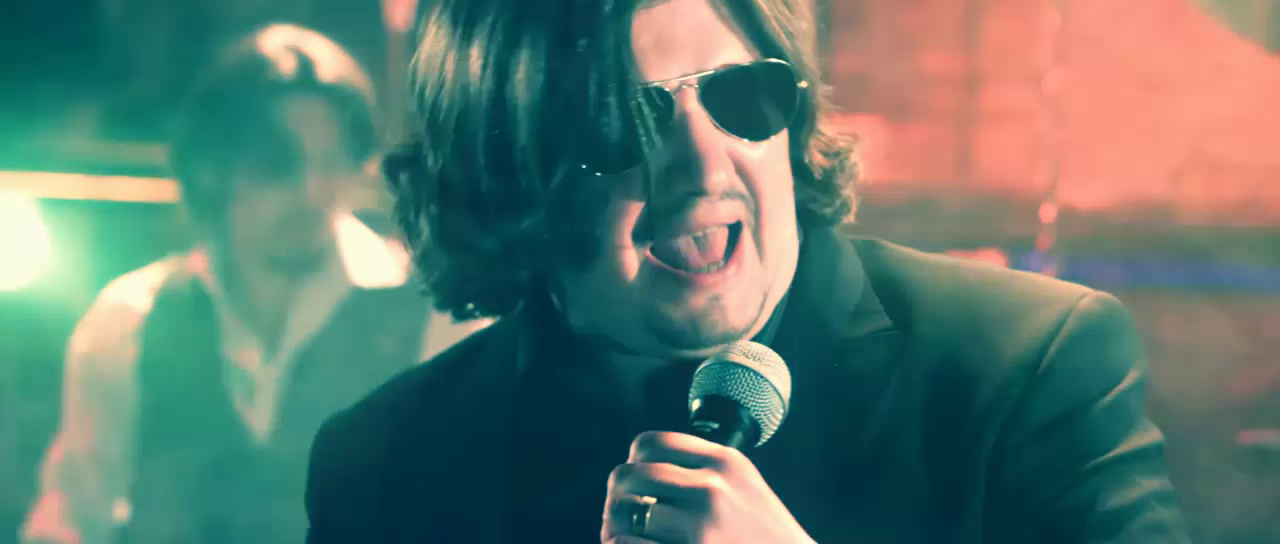
- Țărnă in 2012

Background information
- Born: 25 July 1977 (age 49); Chișinău, Moldova
- Genre: Alternative rock
- Occupations: Singer, actor, showman, TV presenter
- Years active: 1994–present
- Member of: Gândul Mâței
- Website: www.gm.md

Nicu Țărnă (born 25 July 1977) is a singer, actor, showman and TV presenter from Moldova. He is the lead vocalist for the alternative rock band Gândul Mâței.

== Biography ==
Țărnă was born on 25 July 1977 in Chișinău, Moldova. He graduated Moldovan Academy of Music, Theatre and Arts. On 20 June 2013 he married Cristina Cojocaru, an expert at Moldovan National Anticorruption Center.

Since 2013 summer, he is one of three judges of show Moldova are talent (Moldovan version of Got Talent).
