= Nelly Ciobanu =

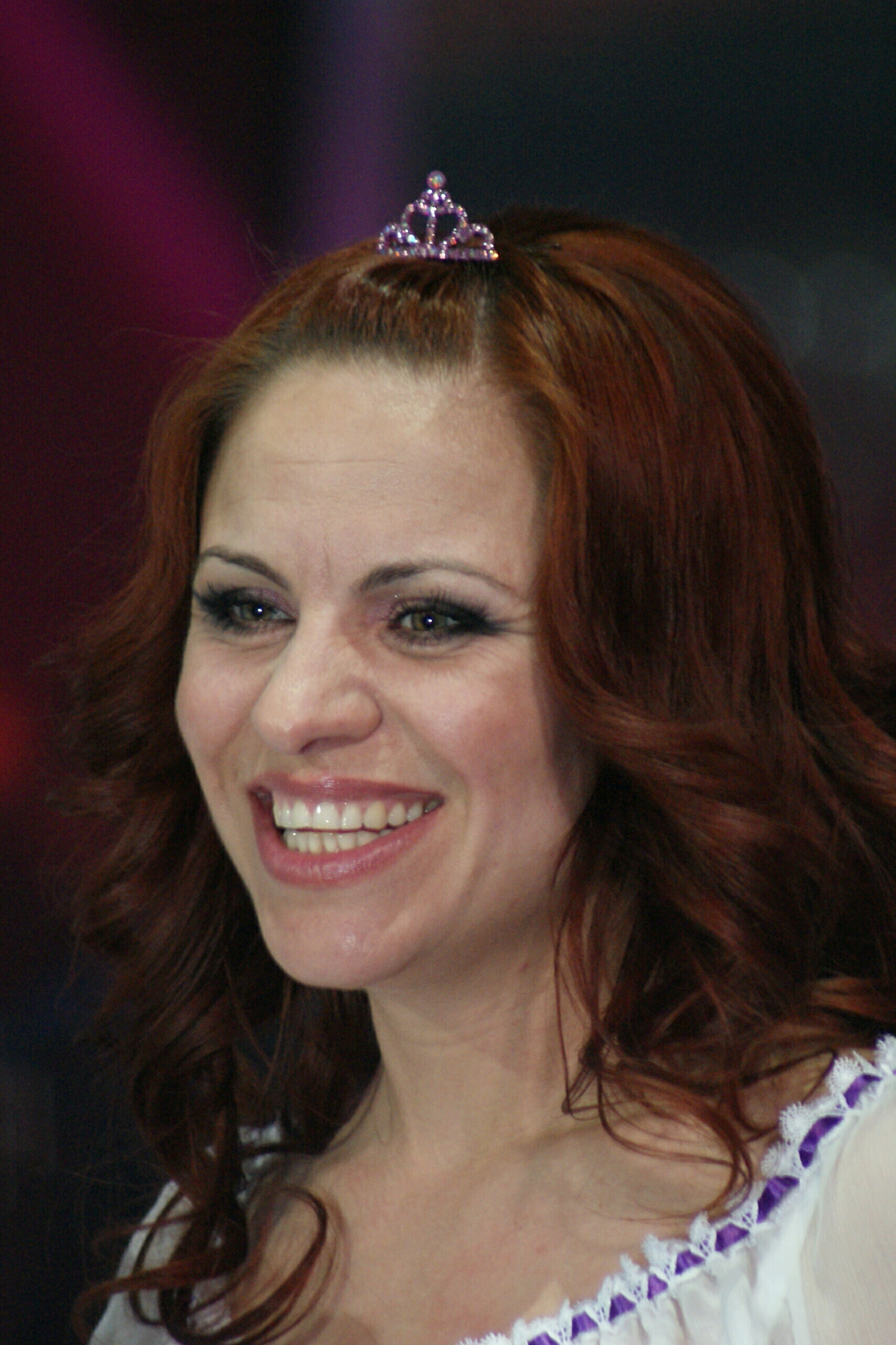
- Ciobanu in 2009

Background information
- Born: Nelea Ciobanu-Mărgineanu; 28 October 1974 (age 52); Cania, Moldavian SSR, USSR
- Genres: World; worldbeat; pop
- Occupation: Singer
- Instrument: Vocals
- Years active: 1993–present
- Website: www.nellyciobanu.com

Nelea Ciobanu-Mărgineanu (born 28 October 1974), known professionally as Nelly Ciobanu (Romanian pronunciation: [ˈneli tʃjoˈbanu]), is a Moldovan singer. Ciobanu graduated from music college of the city of Tiraspol and later made her debut on stage in 1993, with her brother as part of duo "Master Dinamit". She represented Moldova in the Eurovision Song Contest 2009 with the song "Hora din Moldova", placing 14th.

== Life and career ==
Ciobanu is a winner of multiple international competitions: in 1998 won second prize at the festival "Yalta - 98" (Ukraine), 1999 "Grand Prix" at the "Discovery" in Bulgaria (for the performance of a song of composer Liviu Stirbu ), the second prize at the festival "Voice of Asia" (Almaty, Kazakhstan), in 2000 - the first prize at the festival "Slavic Bazaar" in Belarus, the bronze medal of "Delphian Games" in Russia, in 2002, the golden prize of the festival "Spring of April" (North Korea), in 2003 - second prize at the festival "New Wave" in Jūrmala, the Grand Prix of K. Shulzhenko contest (Kharkiv, Ukraine), second place in national pre-selection for Eurovision Song Contest 2005, was jury member at "Five Stars. Sings in 11 languages: Romanian, Russian, English, Italian, and even Korean. She has toured with many Russian artists and international stars such as Patricia Kaas and Mike Bolton. On 24 December 2005 her daughter, Mirela Christiana was born. She is married to Iurie Margineanu.

=== Eurovision Song Contest ===
Nelly Ciobanu represented Moldova in the Eurovision Song Contest 2009 in Moscow, Russia with the song "Hora Din Moldova" which was written by her and composed by Veaceslav Daniliuc. She ranked 14th with 69 points in the Final. It was announced on 16 January 2012 that Nelly Ciobanu would try to represent Moldova once more, with the song "Turn on the light"

Awards and achievements
Preceded by Geta Burlacu with A Century of Love	Moldova in the Eurovision Song Contest; 2009	Succeeded by Sun Stroke Project & Olia Tira with Run Away
