= Moldova in the Eurovision Song Contest 2008 =

- Eurovision Song Contest 2008
- Participating broadcaster: TeleRadio-Moldova (TRM)
- Country: Moldova
- Selection process: O melodie pentru Europa 2008
- Selection date: 9 February 2008

Competing entry
- Song: "A Century of Love"
- Artist: Geta Burlacu
- Songwriters: Oleg Baraliuc; Vica Demici

Placement
- Semi-final result: Failed to qualify (12th)

Participation chronology

Moldova was represented at the Eurovision Song Contest 2008 with the song "A Century of Love", composed by Oleg Baraliuc, with lyrics by Victoria Demici, and performed by Geta Burlacu. The Moldovan participating broadcaster, TeleRadio-Moldova (TRM), organised the national final O melodie pentru Europa 2008 in order to select its entry for the contest. 27 entries competed to represent Moldova, with 12 being shortlisted to participate in the televised national final which took place on 9 February 2008. "A Century of Love" performed by Geta Burlacu emerged as the winner after gaining the most points following the combination of votes from a jury panel, a TRM committee, and a public televote.

Moldova was drawn to compete in the first semi-final of the contest which took place on 20 May 2008. Performing during the show in position 4, "A Century of Love" was not announced among the 10 qualifying entries of the first semi-final and therefore did not qualify to compete in the final. This marked the first time that Moldova failed to qualify to the final of the Eurovision Song Contest from a semi-final since its first entry in 2005. It was later revealed that Moldova placed twelfth out of the 19 participating countries in the semi-final with 36 points.

== Background ==
Prior to the 2008 contest, TeleRadio-Moldova (TRM) had participated in the Eurovision Song Contest representing Moldova three times since its first entry in 2005. Its best placing in the contest was sixth, achieved in 2005 with the song "Boonika bate doba" performed by Zdob și Zdub. Other than its debut entry, to this point, its only other top ten placing at the contest was achieved in 2007 where "Fight" performed by Natalia Barbu placed tenth.

As part of its duties as participating broadcaster, TRM organises the selection of its entry in the Eurovision Song Contest and broadcasts the event in the country. The broadcaster confirmed its intentions to participate at the 2008 contest on 5 November 2007 despite rumours of a withdrawal due to financial difficulties. TRM had selected their entry via an internal selection in 2007. However, the broadcaster opted to select its entry in 2008 via a national selection show.

== Before Eurovision ==
=== O melodie pentru Europa 2008 ===
O melodie pentru Europa 2008 was the national final format developed by TRM in order to select its entry for the Eurovision Song Contest 2008. The event took place at the National Palace in Chișinău, hosted by Rusalina Rusu and Sergiu Raelanu, and included a final to be held on 9 February 2008. The show was broadcast on Moldova 1, TV Moldova Internațional, and Radio Moldova as well as online via TRM's official website trm.md.

==== Competing entries ====
Artists and composers had the opportunity to submit their entries between 5 November 2007 to 11 December 2007. Artists were required to be of Moldovan nationality and could submit more than one song, while an international act was able to compete only if they were either part of a duo or group with at least a member who was of Moldovan nationality or were part of the backing performers with a maximum of two international members. Songwriters could hold any nationality. At the conclusion of the submission deadline, 27 valid entries received by the broadcaster and an advisory online vote was held via trm.md from 12 December 2007. A jury consisting of music professionals as well as representatives of TRM and OGAE Moldova selected 12 finalists out of the 27 received entries, which were announced on 14 December 2007.

Artist	Song	Songwriter(s)	Points	Place
Alexa	"We Are One"	Alexandru Brașoveanu, Elena Buga	82	2
Catrina Pislaru	"Dance With Me"	Valentin Dînga, Hans-Christian Rahn	49	6
Cristina Rujitcaia	"You Make Me Feel Crazy"	Cristina Rujitcaia	52	5
Dana Marchitan	"Your Name"	Ruslan Țăranu	35	8
Edict	"I Believe"	Valeriu Cataragă, Alina Dabija	63	3
Elena Demirdjean	"Living Creatures"	Marian Stîrcea, Elena Reznic	22	11
Galina Scoda	"Your Own Vision"	Marian Stîrcea, Radmila Popovici-Paraschiv	27	9
Geta Burlacu	"A Century of Love"	Oleg Baraliuc, Vica Demici	52	4
Jay Mon	"Point of View"	Ruslan Țăranu	39	7
Liusia Znamensky	"Don't Deceive My Heart"	Ruslan Țăranu	18	12
Olia Tira	"Always Will Be"	Ruslan Țăranu	86	1
Scroom	"Jane"	Iulian Munteanu, Radu Zariciuc	24	10

==== Final ====
The final took place on 9 February 2008. Twelve songs competed and the winner was selected based on the combination of a public televote, the votes of an expert jury and the votes of a committee consisting of TRM representatives. The expert jury included Ghenadie Ciobanu (President of the Union of Composers of Moldova), Anatol Chiriac (composer), Titus Zhukov (Head of the Republican Puppet Theater "Licurici"), Natalia Brasnuev (President of OGAE Moldova), Sergey Gavrilice (editor of VIP Magazin), Vasile Năstase (editor of Glasul Naţiunii), Diana Stratulat (producer) and Victoria Buketaru (director of Fresh FM), while the committee included George Musta (conductor of the TRM National Symphony Orchestra), Ion Kerpek (music producer), Vadim Styngachu (TRM representative of television) and Boris Foksa (member of the TRM coordinator unit). In addition to the performances of the competing entries, Natalia Gordienko, who represented Moldova in 2006, and Natalia Barbu, who represented Moldova in 2007, performed as guests.

At the conclusion of the voting, Geta Burlacu and Olia Tira were tied at 30 points each. The tie was resolved with each member of the expert jury and committee casting one vote for one of the two songs, and "A Century of Love" performed by Geta Burlacu was selected as the winner with 7 votes to 5.

Final – 9 February 2008
R/O	Artist	Song	Jury	Committee	Televote		Total	Place
R/O	Artist	Song	Jury	Committee	Votes	Points	Total	Place
1	Liusia Znamensky	"Don't Deceive My Heart"	3	2	410	0	5	11
2	Elena Demirdjean	"Living Creatures"	5	10	1,350	7	22	5
3	Scroom	"Jane"	1	4	458	0	5	12
4	Galina Scoda	"Your Own Vision"	6	12	1,329	6	24	4
5	Dana Marchitan	"Your Name"	4	3	1,223	5	12	8
6	Jay Mon	"Point of View"	2	6	773	2	10	9
7	Catrina Pislaru	"Dance With Me"	7	5	644	1	13	7
8	Cristina Rujitcaia	"You Make Me Feel Crazy"	3	2	829	3	8	10
9	Geta Burlacu	"A Century of Love"	12	8	4,293	10	30	1
10	Edict	"I Believe"	6	7	1,124	4	17	6
11	Alexa	"We Are One"	8	7	7,665	12	27	3
12	Olia Tira	"Always Will Be"	10	12	2,603	8	30	2

=== Preparation ===
On 20 March, Geta Burlacu released the final version of "A Century of Love" which featured an improved arrangement and the use of additional instruments. The official music video for the song premiered on 15 April.

=== Promotion ===
Geta Burlacu made several appearances across Europe to specifically promote "A Century of Love" as the Moldovan Eurovision entry. On 23 February, Geta Burlacu performed the Moldovan entry as a guest during the Ukrainian Eurovision national final. On 4 and 5 April, Burlacu took part in promotional activities in Romania which included television appearances.

== At Eurovision ==
It was announced in September 2007 that the competition's format would be expanded to two semi-finals in 2008. According to the rules, all nations with the exceptions of the host country and the "Big Four" (France, Germany, Spain, and the United Kingdom) are required to qualify from one of two semi-finals in order to compete for the final; the top nine songs from each semi-final as determined by televoting progress to the final, and a tenth was determined by back-up juries. The European Broadcasting Union (EBU) split up the competing countries into six different pots based on voting patterns from previous contests, with countries with favourable voting histories put into the same pot. On 28 January 2008, a special allocation draw was held which placed each country into one of the two semi-finals. Moldova was placed into the first semi-final, to be held on 20 May 2008. The running order for the semi-finals was decided through another draw on 17 March 2008 and Moldova was set to perform in position 4, following the entry from Estonia and before the entry from San Marino.

The two semi-finals and the final were televised in Moldova on Moldova 1 and TV Moldova Internațional. All broadcasts featured commentary by Lucia Danu and Vitalie Rotaru. TRM appointed Vitalie Rotaru as its spokesperson to announced the Moldovan votes during the final.

=== Semi-final ===
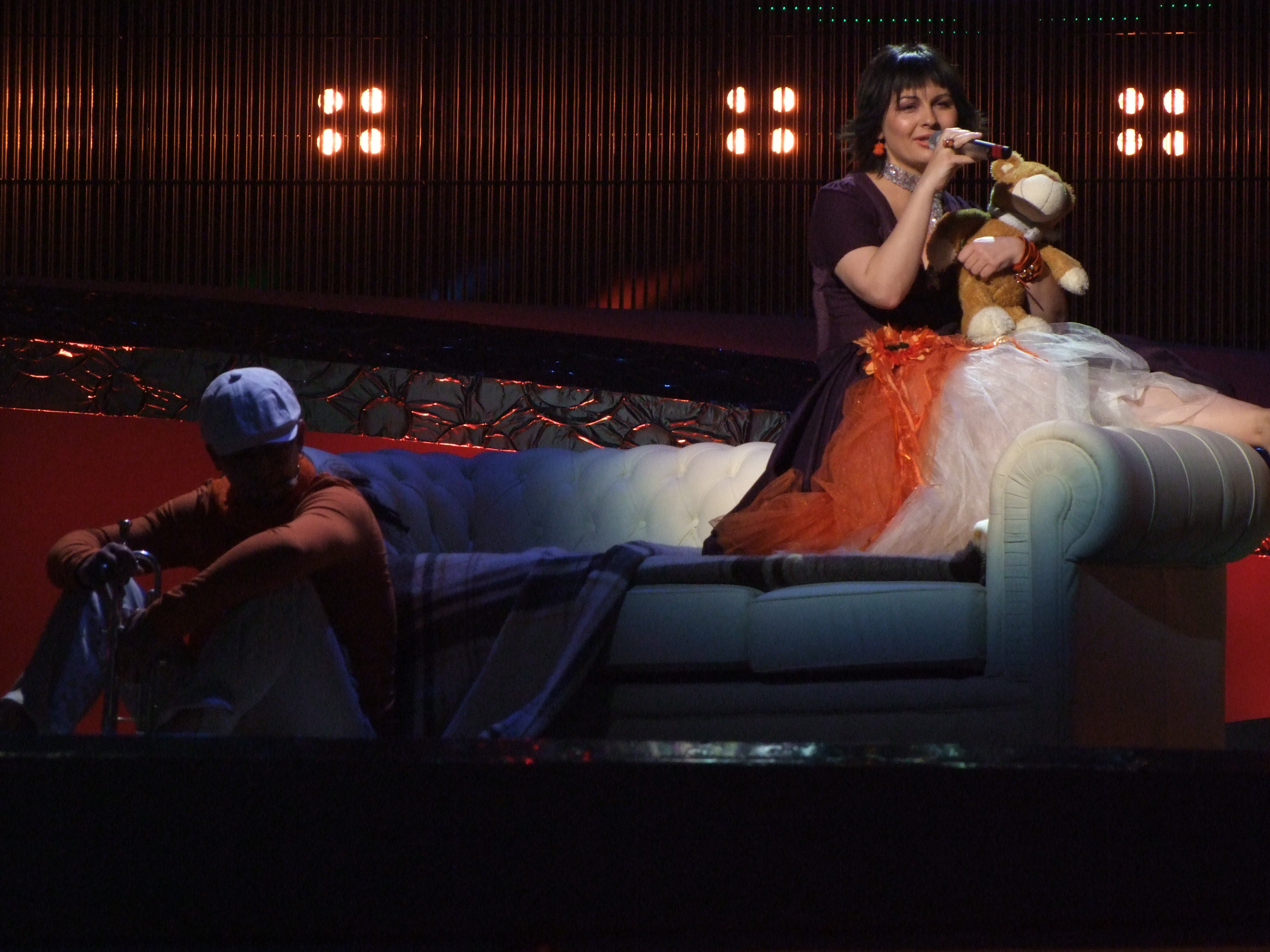
Geta Burlacu during a rehearsal before the first semi-final

Geta Burlacu took part in technical rehearsals on 11 and 15 May, followed by dress rehearsals on 19 and 20 May. The Moldovan performance featured Burlacu dressed in a purple dress with a white and red petticoat underneath as well as a red scarf, and performing on stage barefoot with a trumpet player who wore a red shirt and white trousers. The performance began with Geta Burlacu sitting on a big white sofa and holding a teddy bear in her hands with the trumpet player kneeling in front of it, while it was concluded with Burlacu cuddling in the lap of the trumpet player on the sofa at the end. The stage featured LED screen projections of red, dark green and yellow colours. The trumpet player that joined Geta Burlacu on stage is Petru Haruta.

At the end of the show, Moldova was not announced among the top 10 entries in the first semi-final and therefore failed to qualify to compete in the final. This marked the first time that Moldova failed to qualify to the final of the Eurovision Song Contest from a semi-final since its first entry in 2005. It was later revealed that Moldova placed twelfth in the semi-final, receiving a total of 36 points.

=== Voting ===
Below is a breakdown of points awarded to Moldova and awarded by Moldova in the first semi-final and grand final of the contest. The nation awarded its 12 points to Romania in the semi-final and the final of the contest.

==== Points awarded to Moldova ====
Points awarded to Moldova (Semi-final 1)
Score	Country
12 points	
10 points	Romania
8 points	
7 points	
6 points	Armenia
5 points	Azerbaijan; Russia; San Marino
4 points	Greece
3 points	
2 points	
1 point	Andorra

==== Points awarded by Moldova ====
Points awarded by Moldova (Semi-final 1)
Score	Country
12 points	Romania
10 points	Azerbaijan
8 points	Finland
7 points	Russia
6 points	Bosnia and Herzegovina
5 points	Armenia
4 points	Greece
3 points	Norway
2 points	Slovenia
1 point	Estonia

Points awarded by Moldova (Final)
Score	Country
12 points	Romania
10 points	Russia
8 points	Azerbaijan
7 points	Ukraine
6 points	Israel
5 points	Norway
4 points	Greece
3 points	Georgia
2 points	Armenia
1 point	Serbia
