= Geta Burlacu =

Moldovan singer

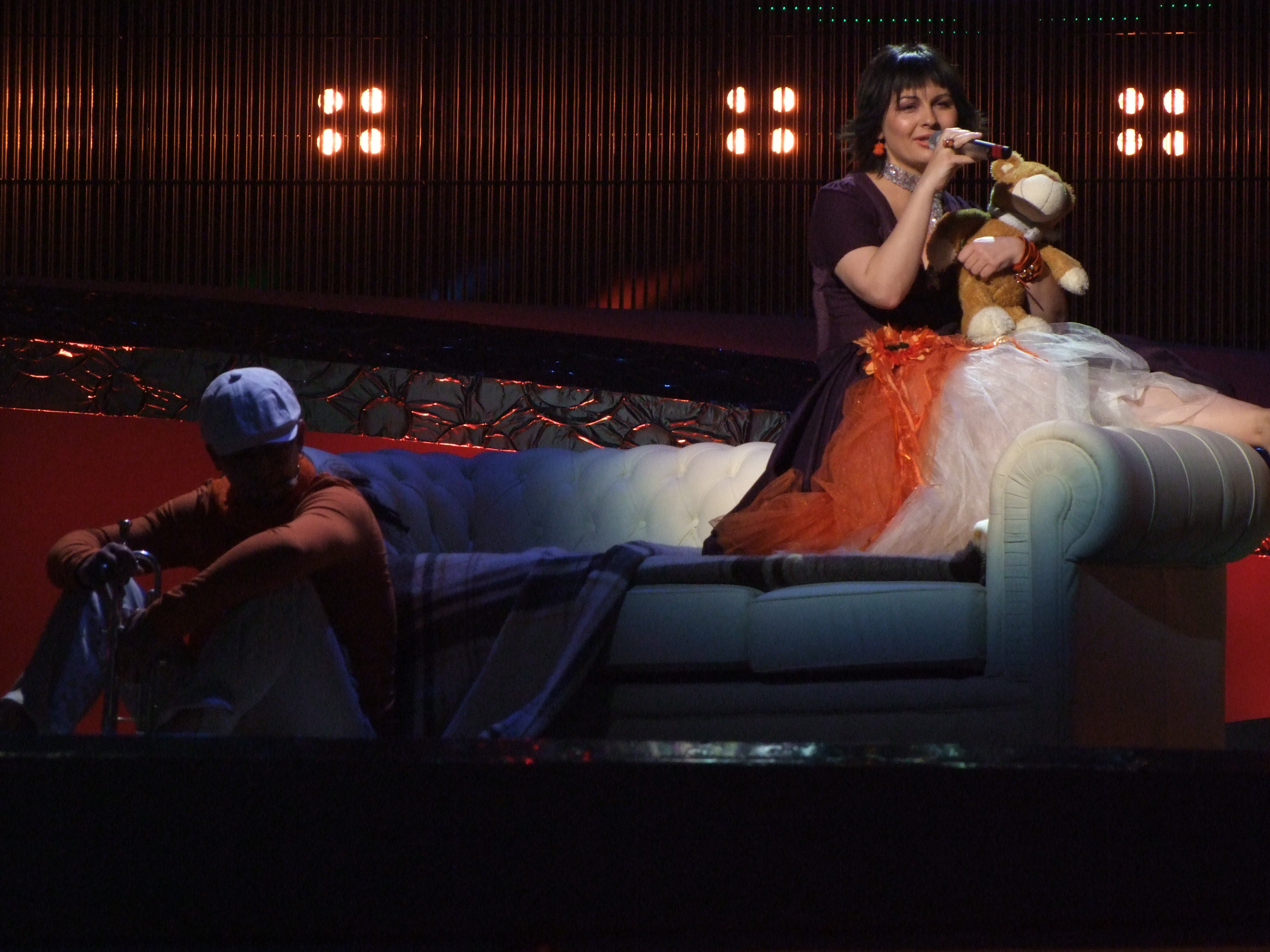
- Burlacu at the Eurovision Song Contest 2008

Background information
- Born: Georgeta Povorozniuc; 22 July 1974 (age 51); Moldavian SSR, USSR
- Genres: Jazz, ethno jazz
- Occupation: Singer

Geta Burlacu (Romanian pronunciation: [ˈdʒeta burˈlaku]; born Georgeta Povorozniuc on 22 July 1974) is a Moldovan singer. She represented Moldova in the Eurovision Song Contest 2008 with the song "A Century of Love", written by Vica Demici and Oleg Baraliuc.

== Career ==
Burlacu began singing at the age of 7. She studied violin at the music school in Bălți and graduated from the College of Music in Balti as a violinist. In 1993 she went to the Academy of Music in Chișinău to study jazz and folk music. After graduation in 1997, Burlacu stepped on the professional scene. She has performed in Germany, France, Ireland, Romania, Ukraine, Belarus, and China. She has won numerous awards at national and international festivals in jazz, pop, and folk.

From 1998 until 2011, Burlacu worked as a singer in the vocal jazz band Univox. From 2005 to 2007, she was a professor of jazz voice at the Academy of Music, Theatre and Fine Arts in Moldova. In 2006, she won a scholarship from the Soros Foundation. In 2007, Burlacu participated in an international tour with the Cuban band Buena Vista Social Club in Romania. In 2008, she represented Moldova at the Eurovision Song Contest with the song "A Century of Love" which failed to qualify receiving 36 points, tying with Slovenia in points and placing 12th. In 2009, she participated in the Golden Stag Festival, where she reached the finals in Brasov, Romania.

From 2009 to the present, she performed with the National Symphony Orchestra TeleRadio-Moldova, as well with the jazz bands Alex Calancea Band, ANGRY Band, and the folk music band Taraf lăutăresc. In 2010, she toured Europe with Alex Calancea Band. In 2011, Burlacu participated in the concert Women Day in the celebration Forty Years La Francophonie organized by UNESCO in Paris. In 2012, she released an album of Christmas carols, Să ningă cerul peste noi, and participated in a charity concert with the Black & White and Jazz Big Band (Tiraspol) in the National Theatre of Opera and Ballet.

She gave numerous recitals in the Main Square of the Republic of Moldova in a concert dedicated to the Independence Day of Moldova. She attended the Moldovan Festival in London, taking part in social and charity projects. She was named Goodwill ambassador to the United Nations Population Fund in Moldova.

In 2013, she implemented a long-held dream and appeared in The Erotic Carousel by David Hare and directed by George Tavadze at the Eugene Ionesco theater in Chișinău.

In 2014, at the invitation of the Association Connexions Moldavie and with the support of the Office for Diaspora Relations, Burlacu held two concerts, Winter Jazz in Paris and Luxembourg, where she was warmly welcomed by Moldovan diaspora representatives and heads of the Moldovan Embassy in Belgium and France. This was the first official concert of representatives of Moldovan Culture in Luxembourg.

== Competitions ==
- 2009 – Finalist of the International Festival Golden Stag (Golden Stag), Romania
- 2008 – Winner of the local pre–selection Eurovision
- 13/09/2007 – Laureate of the Ethno–jazz festival Trigon, Chișinău
- 02/07/2007 – Laureate of the International Festival Faces of Friends, Moldova
- 30/04/2007 – Opening Concert Soloist Buena Vista Social Club, National Theatre, Bucharest, Romania
- 2007–27–04 – Opening Concert soloist Buena Vista Social Club, Opera, Cluj-Napoca, Romania
- 2004 – Winner at the International Jazz Festival DODJ
- 2001 – Special Prize of the National Festival of Folk Music Tamara Ceban Moldova
- 2001 – Participant of the International Festival International Festival of Universal Music (FIMU), Belfort, France
- 2001 – Participant of the international music festival New Impro Music Fest, Moldova
- 2001 – Soloist of Folk Music Orchestra in Romanian Folk Music Week, Germany
- 2000 – Participant of the international festival International Festival of Universal Music (FIMU), Belfort, France
- 2000 – Participant of the international festival of art, INTACT, Cluj-Napoca, Romania
- 2000 – Participant of the international festival Jazz Weekend, Moldova
- 2000 - Participant of the National Festival "Mărţişor" Moldova
- 1999 – Participant of the international festival Jazz Weekend, Moldova
- 1997 – Diploma international contest Golden hits, Belarus
- 1997 – Grand Prix of republican competition Young Star, Moldova

== Discography ==
- 2005 Ce n-ca da sa mor diseara
- 2008 La Porta Pamantalui
- 2009 O Sete Nebuna
- 2010 Cine Iubeshte
- 2012 Sa ninga cerul peste noi

Awards and achievements
| Preceded by Natalia Barbu with Fight | Moldova in the Eurovision Song Contest; 2008 | Succeeded by Nelly Ciobanu with Hora din Moldova |
