= Gândul Mâței =

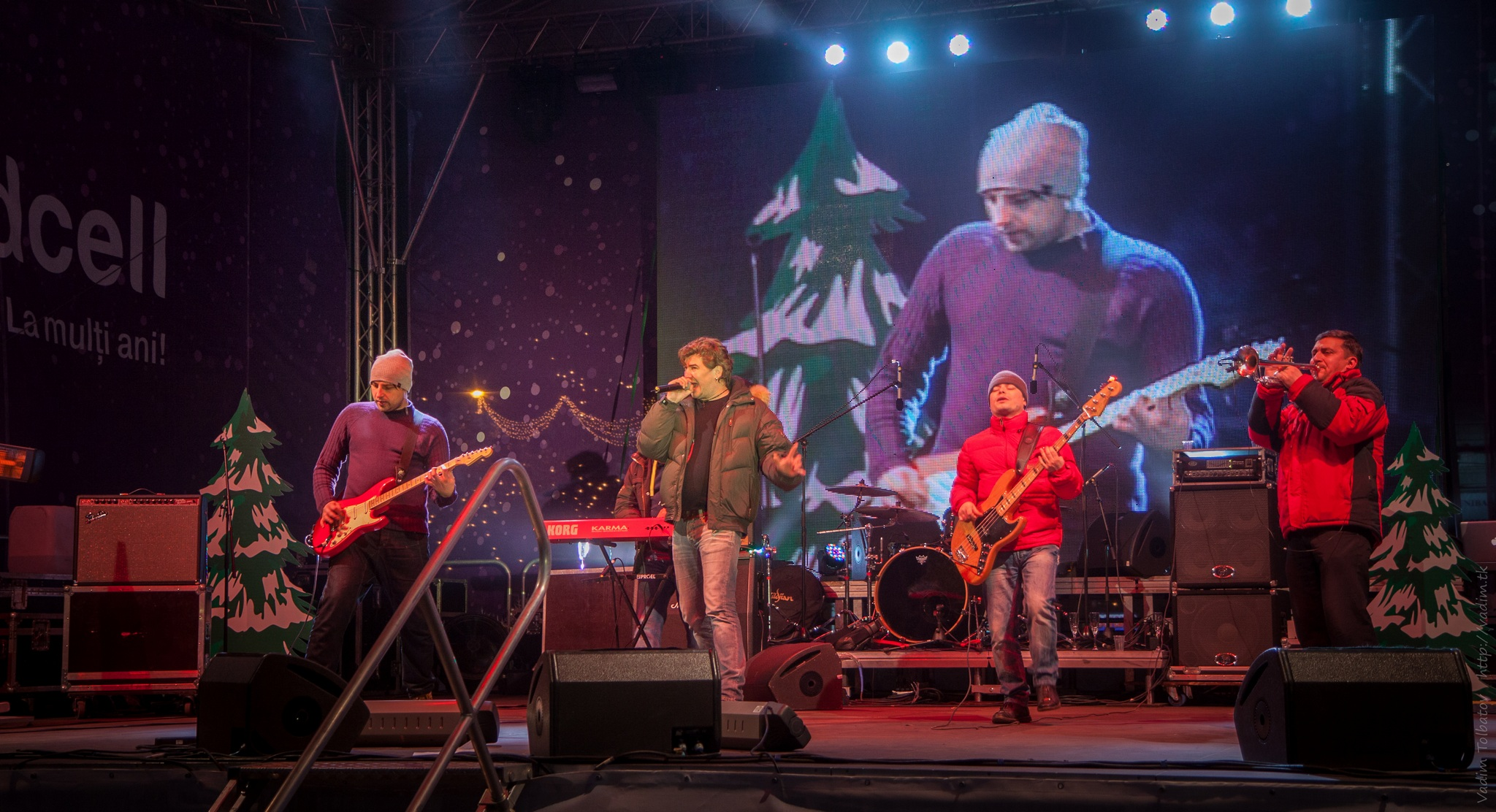
- Gândul Mâței performing live during a concert held în Chișinău, Moldova (2014)

Background information
- Origin: Chișinău, Moldova
- Genres: Alternative rock
- Years active: 1996–present
- Labels: Real Sound, Infomedia, Mavr Company
- Members: Nicu Țărnă; Sergiu Iarovoi; Igor Cristov; Ghenadie Cazac; Sergiu Rusu
- Website: www.gm.md

Gândul Mâței (Romanian pronunciation: [ˌɡɨndul ˈmɨt͡sej], "The cat's thought") is a Moldovan alternative rock band from Chișinău, formed in 1996.

== Members ==
Current members:

- Nicu Țărnă – vocal
- Sergiu Iarovoi – guitar
- Igor Cristov – keyboards
- Ghenadie Cazac – trumpet
- Sergiu Rusu – bass guitar

Former members:

- Bogdan Dascăl
- Dan Popov
- Valeriu Mazalu
- "Mamba"
- Iurie Berdea (died 2021)

== Discography ==
=== Albums ===
==== Cu Gândul La Ea – 2000 ====
| | Title | Duration |
|---|---|---|
| 1. | În jurul nostru | 2:59 |
| 2. | La Ciocana | 3:27 |
| 3. | Numai Tu | 3:37 |
| 4. | My Christmas Day | 6:47 |
| 5. | Fata Mea | 2:04 |
| 6. | Nae | 3:48 |
| 7. | Kotlete | 3:02 |
| 8. | Liberty | 5:57 |
| 9. | Hostropăț | 3:38 |
| 10. | Don't Tell Me Why | 3:10 |
| 11. | Requiem | 6:17 |
| 12. | Intro | 3:04 |

==== La Ciocana – 2004 ====
| | Titlu | Durata |
|---|---|---|
| 1. | Dragostea mea | 3:50 |
| 2. | La Ciocana | 3:27 |
| 3. | În jurul nostru | 2:59 |
| 4. | Cândva plecat... | 5:41 |
| 5. | Fata mea | 2:02 |
| 6. | Cotlete cu goroh | 3:04 |
| 7. | Nae | 4:03 |
| 8. | Liber tu | 5:22 |
| 9. | Numai tu | 3:37 |
| 10. | Hostropăț | 3:44 |
| 11. | Proba credinței | 4:40 |

==== Ла Чокана - 2004 ====
La Ciocana re-edited in Russian
| | Title | Duration |
|---|---|---|
| 1. | Это Любовь | 3:52 |
| 2. | Ла Чокана | 3:26 |
| 3. | Вокруг Меня | 3:07 |
| 4. | Напрасный Крик | 5:39 |
| 5. | Моей Подруге... | 2:02 |
| 6. | Котлеты и Горох | 3:02 |
| 7. | Нае | 4:01 |
| 8. | Только Ты | 3:36 |
| 9. | Не Спасти... | 5:22 |
| 10. | Молдавский Танец | 3:42 |
| 11. | Песенка Про Колю | 2:54 |
| 12. | Письмо | 4:41 |
| 13. | О Чём Плачут Гитары | 2:36 |
| 14. | La Ciocana | 3:25 |

==== GheM în GheM – 2005 ====
| | Title | Duration |
|---|---|---|
| 1. | Paradox (song) | 3:16 |
| 2. | Balaurul | 2:59 |
| 3. | Semafor | 3:07 |
| 4. | Lora | 3:50 |
| 5. | Vestitorii de furtuni | 4:05 |
| 6. | Și-așa-mi vine... | 4:03 |
| 7. | Opțiunea ta | 3:35 |
| 8. | Prieten de drum | 4:28 |
| 9. | Am sa vin... | 4:07 |
| 10. | Fraze | 4:05 |
| 11. | GheM in GheM | 2:25 |
| 12. | Requiem | 6:31 |
| 13. | Dragostea mea (remix) | 2:45 |
| 14. | Cotlete cu goroh (remix) | 4:27 |

==== Комета - 2007 ====
| | Title | Duration |
|---|---|---|
| 1. | Комета | 4:05 |
| 2. | Balaurul | 2:57 |
| 3. | Найду тебя | 4:04 |
| 4. | Полет | 3:19 |
| 5. | Я вернусь | 4:05 |
| 6. | Și-așa-mi vine... | 4:01 |
| 7. | Semafor | 3:07 |
| 8. | Ghem în ghem | 2:23 |
| 9. | Lora | 3:50 |
| 10. | Opțiunea ta | 3:33 |
| 11. | Requiem | 6:31 |
| 12. | Это любовь (акустика) | 2:46 |
| 13. | Ла Чокана (акустика) | 3:17 |

==== Generația în Blugi – 2014 ====
| | Titlu | Durata |
|---|---|---|
| 1. | Generația în Blugi | 3:24 |
| 2. | Cântec de dragoste | 3:34 |
| 3. | Vremea grăbită | 4:38 |
| 4. | Alo, Da! | 5:06 |
| 5. | Ingera | 3:26 |
| 6. | Poseidon | 3:24 |
| 7. | Revin | 4:32 |
| 8. | Parampampam | 3:02 |
| 9. | Știu | 4:24 |
| 10. | Vestitorii de furtuni | 4:40 |
| 11. | Fii mai tare! | 3:58 |
| 12. | Te implor... Iarta-mă | 4:35 |
| 13. | Viața e o întâmplare | 3:27 |

=== EPs ===
==== În Profil (EP) – 2008 ====
| | Title | Duration |
|---|---|---|
| 1. | Kotlete | |
| 2. | Nae | |
| 3. | La Ciocana | |
| 4. | Don't Tell Me Why | |
| 5. | Liber Tu | |
| 6. | În Jurul Nostru | |
| 7. | Fata Mea | |
| 8. | Probă Credinței | |
| 9. | Dragostea Mea | |
| 10. | Am Să Vin | |
| 11. | Și-așa-mi vine... (bonus) | |
