= Violine =

Belgian comic book

- Cover of Violine #1 (2001)

Publication information
- Publisher: Dupuis; Casterman
- Format: Ongoing series
- No. of issues: 6-ish

Creative team
- Created by: Tronchet
- Written by: Tronchet; Fabrice Tarrin
- Artist(s): Fabrice Tarrin; Jean-Marc Krings; Bruno Brumaire
- Colorist(s): Fabrice Tarrin; Audré Jardel; Cyril Lieron

Violine is a Franco-Belgian comic book series, as well as the name of its main character, created by writer Didier "Tronchet" Vasseur and artist Fabrice Tarrin for Spirou magazine.

The series has been published in French, Dutch, and German (under the name Violetta), but not in English.

== Synopsis ==
Violine is a young girl with a special power: a stare from her large violet eyes allows her to read one's thoughts and intentions. She lives in a mansion with her wealthy and domineering mother, who is somehow immune to this power. Her mother claims that Violine's father has died when she was three, but after finding evidence to the contrary, Violine embarks to Africa as a stowaway in search for him.

In the reboot, Le Troisième œil, there's been a time skip and Violine is now 16 years old.

== Published volumes ==
Original series, published by Dupuis

1. Les Yeux de la tête (2001) – story by Tronchet and Fabrice Tarrin, art and coloring by Fabrice Tarrin
2. Le Mauvais œil (2002) – story by Tronchet and Fabrice Tarrin, art by Fabrice Tarrin, coloring by Audré Jardel
3. Le bras de fer (2006) – story by Tronchet and Fabrice Tarrin, art by Fabrice Tarrin and Jean-Marc Krings, coloring by Cyril Lieron
4. La caverne de l'oubli (2006) – story by Tronchet, art by Jean-Marc Krings, coloring by Cyril Lieron
5. La Maison-piège (2007) – story by Tronchet, art by Jean-Marc Krings, coloring by Cyril Lieron

Published by La Vache qui médite

1. Le sommeil empoisonné (2013) — numbered 6 on the cover: a reprint of 5 with 20 pages from an abandoned story

Published by Casterman

1. Le Troisième œil (2018) — story by Tronchet, art by Bruno Brumaire
2. Le Troisième œil, tome 2: La Larme d'émeraude (upcoming 2024) story by Tronchet, art by Bruno Brumaire
