= TV Moldova Internațional =

- Country: Moldova

Programming
- Picture format: 576i (4:3 SDTV)

Ownership
- Owner: Teleradio-Moldova

History
- Launched: 10 January 2007; 18 years ago
- Closed: 1 January 2013; 12 years ago

Links
- Website: www.trm.md

Availability

Streaming media
- TV Moldova Intl: LIVE!

TV Moldova Internațional was the international second TV channel operated by the national public broadcaster of Moldova, Teleradio-Moldova.

Launched on 10 January 2007, it takes back almost all the programs of the first Moldovan television channel Moldova 1, except some broadcasts for which the latter does not possess broadcasting rights outside of the Moldovan territory.

The channel was announced to restart in November 2013, after it was shut down due to budget constraints.

== See also ==
- Union of Journalists of Moldova
- Străşeni TV Mast
