= Anatol Chiriac =

Moldovan composer (born 1953)

Anatol Chiriac OR

Member of the Moldovan Parliament
- In office 10 March 1990 – 29 March 1994
- Parliamentary group: Popular Front
- Constituency: Florești

Personal details
- Born: Coșernița, Moldavian SSR, Soviet Union
- Party: Popular Front of Moldova
- Profession: composer

Anatol Chiriac (born 9 October 1953) is a Moldovan composer.

== Biography ==
Born in 1953. In 1979 he completed Stefan Neaga music college in Chişinău. In 1983 he recorded his first instrumental works LP, which has strong influence of James Last (e. g. use of panflute and others). His next LP, issued in 1984, represented songs to verses by Grigore Vieru. The song "Romantică" (Романтикэ), performed by Sofia Rotaru, quickly became a hit in the entire Soviet Union. During few years his composition "Mihaela" (Михаэла) accomplished weather forecasts in the Soviet TV news program "Vremya" (Время). Near 1985 Chiriac formed his own instrumental ensemble, recorded with it new LP and had tours to Japan and Mocambique. In 1990-1994 Chiriac was elected to the Parliament of Moldova.
