= Georgia in the Eurovision Song Contest 2015 =

- Eurovision Song Contest 2015
- Participating broadcaster: Georgian Public Broadcaster (GPB)
- Country: Georgia
- Selection process: Erovnuli Shesarcevi konkursi 2015
- Selection date: 14 January 2015

Competing entry
- Song: "Warrior"
- Artist: Nina Sublatti
- Songwriters: Nina Sublatti; Thomas G:son

Placement
- Semi-final result: Qualified (4th, 98 points)
- Final result: 11th, 51 points

Participation chronology

Georgia was represented at the Eurovision Song Contest 2015 with the song "Warrior", written by Nina Sublatti and Thomas G:son, and performed by Nina Sublatti. The Georgian participating broadcaster, Georgian Public Broadcaster (GPB), held a national final in order to select its entry for the contest. An open call for submissions was held which resulted in the shortlisting of five entries that were presented to the public on 31 December 2014. The public had until 14 January 2015 to vote for their favourite song. The results of the public televote combined with the votes of an international jury resulted in the selection of "Warrior" performed by Nina Sublatti as the Georgian entry.

Georgia was drawn to compete in the first semi-final of the Eurovision Song Contest which took place on 19 May 2015. Performing as the closing entry during the show in position 16, "Warrior" was announced among the top 10 entries of the second semi-final and therefore qualified to compete in the final on 23 May. It was later revealed that Georgia placed fourth out of the 16 participating countries in the semi-final with 98 points. In the final, Georgia performed in position 23 and placed eleventh out of the 27 participating countries, scoring 51 points.

== Background ==
Prior to the 2015 contest, Georgia had participated in the Eurovision Song Contest seven times since their first entry in 2007. The nation's highest placing in the contest, to this point, has been ninth place, which was achieved on two occasions: in 2010 with the song "Shine" performed by Sofia Nizharadze and in 2011 with the song "One More Day" performed by Eldrine. The nation briefly withdrew from the contest in 2009 after the European Broadcasting Union (EBU) rejected the Georgian entry, "We Don't Wanna Put In", for perceived political references to Vladimir Putin who was the Russian Prime Minister at the time. The withdrawal and fallout was tied to tense relations between Georgia and then host country Russia, which stemmed from the 2008 Russo-Georgian War. Following the introduction of semi-finals, Georgia has, to this point, failed to qualify to the final on only two occasions. In 2014, Georgia failed to qualify to the final with the song "Three Minutes to Earth" performed by the Shin and Mariko.

The Georgian national broadcaster, Georgian Public Broadcaster (GPB), broadcasts the event within Georgia and organises the selection process for the nation's entry. GPB confirmed their intentions to participate at the 2015 Eurovision Song Contest on 10 September 2014. Georgia has selected their entry for the Eurovision Song Contest both through national finals and internal selections in the past. In 2013 and 2014, GPB opted to internally select the Georgian entry. For their 2015 participation, the Georgian entry was selected via a national final.

== Before Eurovision ==
=== Erovnuli Shesarcevi konkursi 2015 ===
GPB opened a public submission from 3 December 2014 until 20 December 2014. An international jury selected the top five entries from the received submissions, which were announced on 23 December 2014 and presented to the public on 31 December 2014 via the GPB First Channel programme Komunikatori, hosted by Meri Shikhasvili, Nastasia Arabuli and Sergi Gvarjaladze. The public was able to vote for their favourite entries through telephone and SMS between 1 and 14 January 2015 and the winner, "Warrior" performed by Nina Sublatti, was determined upon by the combination of the votes of the international jury and the public televote, and was announced on 14 January 2015 via Komunikatori. The international jury consisted of Emmelie de Forest (winner of the Eurovision Song Contest 2013), Eugen Eliu (songwriter), Marco Brey (journalist), Thomas G:son (composer) and Ralf Reinink (journalist).

R/O	Artist	Song	Songwriter(s)	Jury	Televote	Total	Place
1	Eter Beriashvili	"If Someone"	José Juan Santana Rodríguez, Rafael Artesero	15	14%	48	4
2	Edvard Meison	"We Are Freeeee"	Edvard Meison, Tako Vadachkoria	7	5.9%	21	5
3	Niutone	"Run Away"	Niutone, Mariam Chikhradze	13	31.9%	67	2
4	Nina Sublatti	"Warrior"	Nina Sublatti	21	38.1%	92	1
5	Misha Sulukhia	"One and Only"	Misha Sulukhia, Teo Zeinklishvili	19	10%	51	3

Detailed International Jury Votes
R/O	Song	E. de Forest	E. Eliu	M. Brey	T. G:son	R. Reinink	Total
1	"If Someone"	4	2	2	3	4	15
2	"We Are Freeeee"	3	1	1	1	1	7
3	"Run Away"	1	4	4	2	2	13
4	"Warrior"	5	3	5	5	3	21
5	"One and Only"	2	5	3	4	5	19

=== Preparation ===
Nina Sublatti worked with Swedish composer Thomas G:son in order to record the final version of "Warrior" following the national final. On 11 March, the final version of the song premiered together with the music video which was filmed between 28 February 2015 and 1 March 2015. The music video was directed and produced by David Gogokhia and Studio BigCAKE, and featured Sublatti and five other women: Nina Potskhishvili, Mariam Sanogo, Keta Gavasheli, Lina Tsiklauri and Dea Aptsiauri, all dressed in warrior-like outfits created by Georgian designer Lasha Jokhadze.

== At Eurovision ==
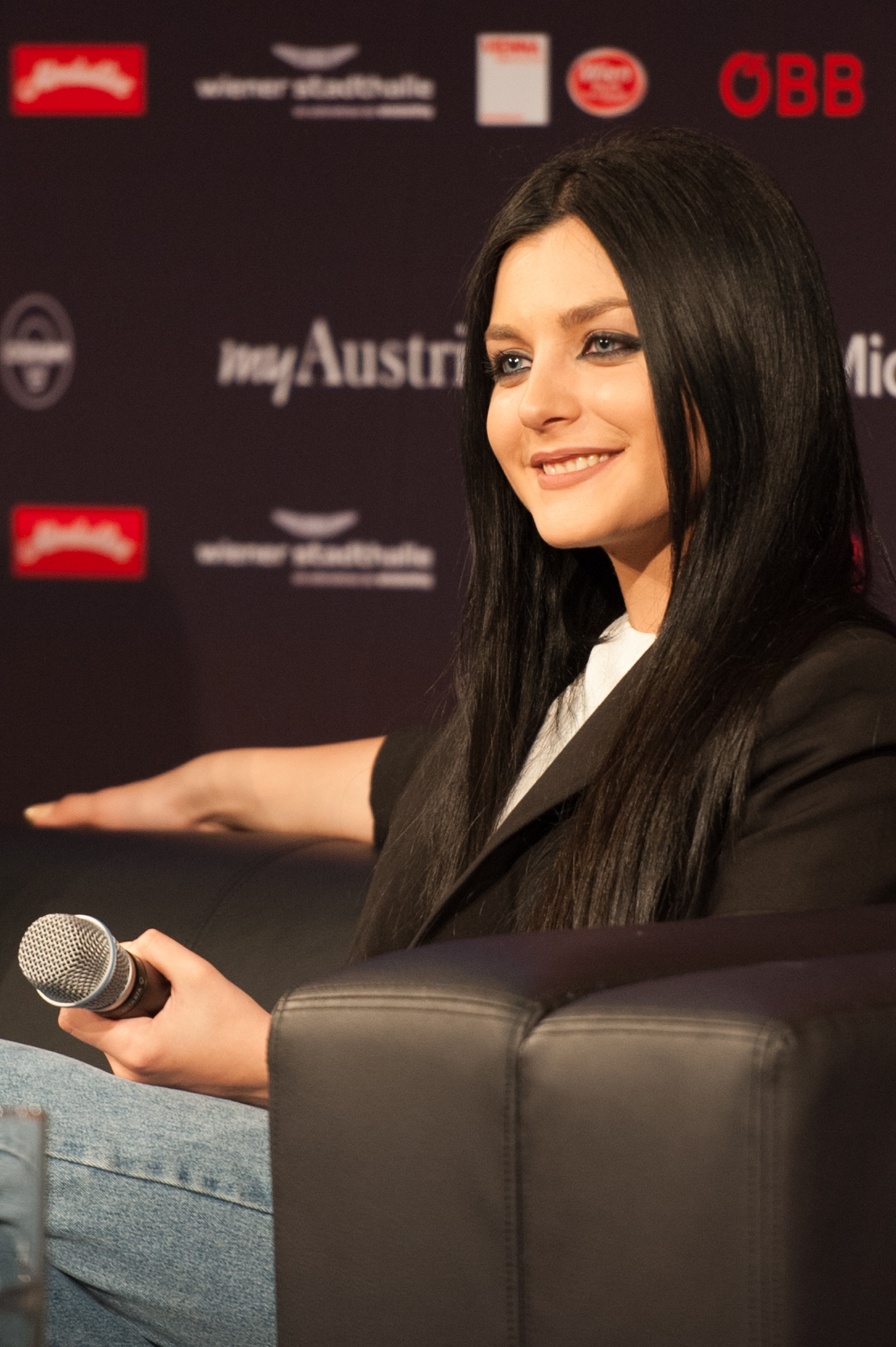
Nina Sublatti during a press meet and greet

According to Eurovision rules, all nations with the exceptions of the host country and the "Big Five" (France, Germany, Italy, Spain and the United Kingdom) are required to qualify from one of two semi-finals in order to compete for the final; the top ten countries from each semi-final progress to the final. In the 2015 contest, Australia also competed directly in the final as an invited guest nation. The European Broadcasting Union (EBU) split up the competing countries into five different pots based on voting patterns from previous contests, with countries with favourable voting histories put into the same pot. On 26 January 2015, an allocation draw was held which placed each country into one of the two semi-finals, as well as which half of the show they would perform in. Georgia was placed into the first semi-final, to be held on 19 May 2015, and was scheduled to perform in the second half of the show.

Once all the competing songs for the 2015 contest had been released, the running order for the semi-finals was decided by the shows' producers rather than through another draw, so that similar songs were not placed next to each other. Georgia was set to perform last in position 16, following the entry from Romania.

Both the semi-finals and the final were broadcast in Georgia on GPB First Channel with commentary by Lado Tatishvili and Tamuna Museridze. The Georgian spokesperson, who announced the Georgian votes during the final, was Natia Bunturi.

=== Semi-final ===
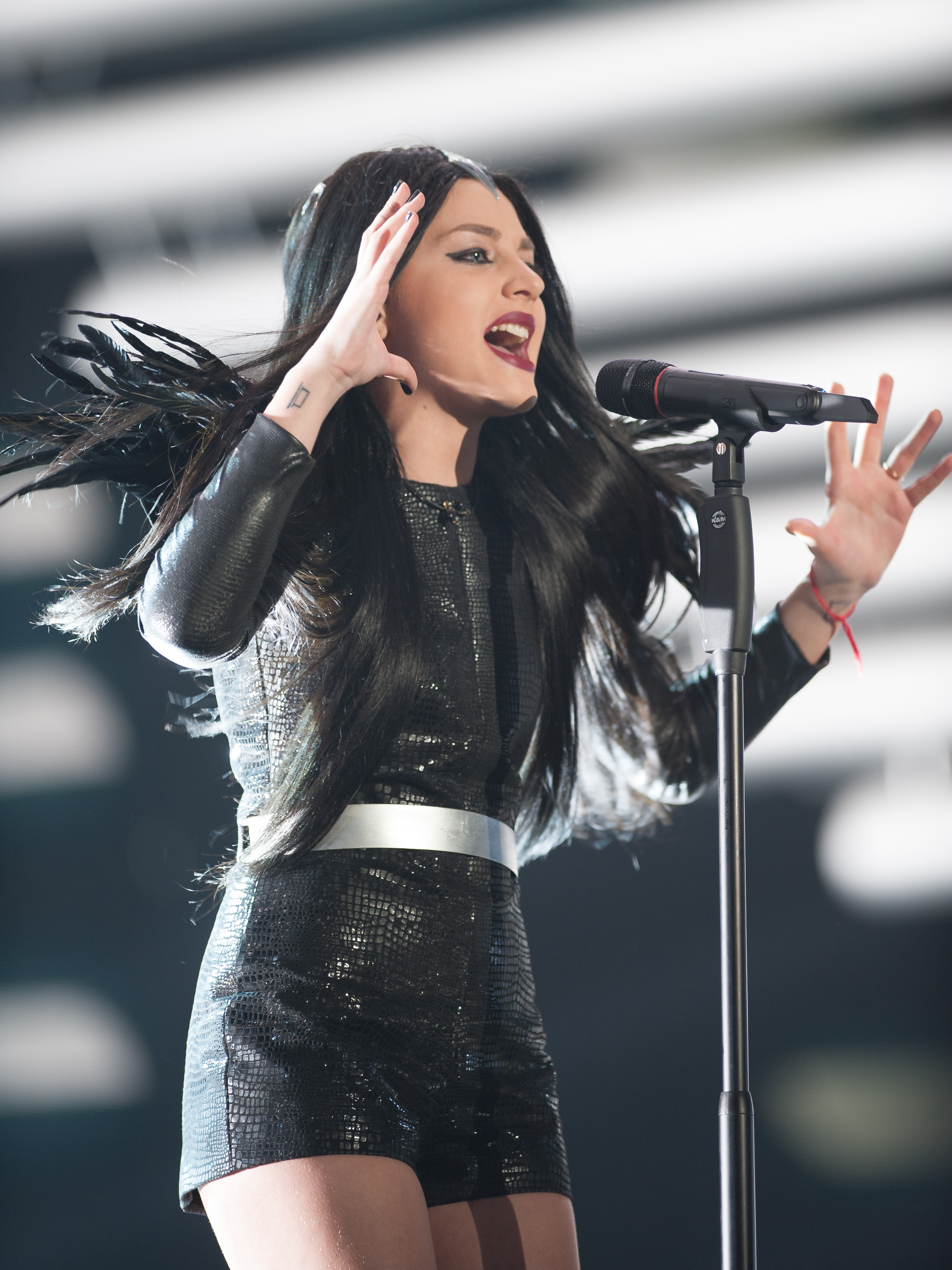
Nina Sublatti during a dress rehearsal before the first semi-final

Nina Sublatti took part in technical rehearsals on 12 and 15 May, followed by dress rehearsals on 18 and 19 May. This included the jury final on 18 May where the professional juries of each country watched and voted on the competing entries.

The Georgian performance featured Nina Sublatti in a black costume, designed by Georgian designer Keti Chkhikvadze, including leather boots, a crown and traditional jewellery. The staging for the performance focused on dark colours with the LED screens transitioning through images of dark clouds, lightning, large white wings and eyes filled with tears. The stage designer of the Georgian performance, Sacha Jean-Baptiste, stated: "Our goal was to show the song, which has a very generic message about strong women and feminism, with a very personal stage performance by Nina." Sublatti was the only performer visible during the performance, however, she was joined by two backing vocalists: Veronika Hammer and Rebecca Kollau-Freidinger.

At the end of the show, Georgia was announced as having finished in the top ten and subsequently qualifying for the grand final. It was later revealed that Georgia placed fourth in the semi-final, receiving a total of 98 points.

=== Final ===
Shortly after the first semi-final, a winner's press conference was held for the ten qualifying countries. As part of this press conference, the qualifying artists took part in a draw to determine which half of the grand final they would subsequently participate in. This draw was done in the order the countries were announced during the semi-final. Georgia was drawn to compete in the second half. Following this draw, the shows' producers decided upon the running order of the final, as they had done for the semi-finals. Georgia was subsequently placed to perform in position 23, following the entry from Hungary and before the entry from Azerbaijan.

Nina once again took part in dress rehearsals on 22 and 23 May before the final, including the jury final where the professional juries cast their final votes before the live show. Sublatti performed a repeat of her semi-final performance during the final on 23 May. At the conclusion of the voting, Georgia finished in eleventh place with 51 points.

=== Voting ===
Voting during the three shows consisted of 50 percent public televoting and 50 percent from a jury deliberation. The jury consisted of five music industry professionals who were citizens of the country they represent, with their names published before the contest to ensure transparency. This jury was asked to judge each contestant based on: vocal capacity; the stage performance; the song's composition and originality; and the overall impression by the act. In addition, no member of a national jury could be related in any way to any of the competing acts in such a way that they cannot vote impartially and independently. The individual rankings of each jury member were released shortly after the grand final.

Following the release of the full split voting by the EBU after the conclusion of the competition, it was revealed that Georgia had placed thirteenth with the public televote and tenth with the jury vote in the final. In the public vote, Georgia scored 52 points, while with the jury vote, Georgia scored 62 points. In the first semi-final, Georgia placed fourth with the public televote with 96 points and third with the jury vote, scoring 90 points.

Below is a breakdown of points awarded to Georgia and awarded by Georgia in the first semi-final and grand final of the contest, and the breakdown of the jury voting and televoting conducted during the two shows:

==== Points awarded to Georgia ====
Points awarded to Georgia (Semi-final 1)
Score	Country
12 points	Armenia
10 points	Belarus; Moldova
8 points	Greece
7 points	Australia; Russia
6 points	Estonia; Hungary
5 points	Denmark; Finland; Spain
4 points	Albania; Romania
3 points	Macedonia
2 points	Austria; Belgium
1 point	Netherlands; Serbia

Points awarded to Georgia (Final)
Score	Country
12 points	
10 points	Armenia; Azerbaijan
8 points	
7 points	
6 points	Lithuania
5 points	Moldova; Russia
4 points	Czech Republic
3 points	Belarus; Hungary
2 points	Greece
1 point	Australia; Belgium; Estonia

==== Points awarded by Georgia ====
Points awarded by Georgia (Semi-final 1)
Score	Country
12 points	Belarus
10 points	Moldova
8 points	Armenia
7 points	Russia
6 points	Albania
5 points	Belgium
4 points	Greece
3 points	Estonia
2 points	Netherlands
1 point	Romania

Points awarded by Georgia (Final)
Score	Country
12 points	Armenia
10 points	Azerbaijan
8 points	Italy
7 points	Sweden
6 points	Belgium
5 points	Russia
4 points	Latvia
3 points	Lithuania
2 points	Estonia
1 point	Israel

==== Detailed voting results ====
The following members comprised the Georgian jury:

- Zaza Shengelia (jury chairperson) – musical producer
- Chabuka Amiranashvili – composer, musician
- Nodiko Tatishvili – singer, represented Georgia in the 2013 contest
- Sopio Oqreshidze – vocal teacher, pianist
- Sopho Gelovani – singer, represented Georgia in the 2013 contest

Detailed voting results from Georgia (Semi-final 1)
R/O	Country	Z. Shengelia	C. Amiranashvili	N. Tatishvili	S. Oqreshidze	S. Gelovani	Jury Rank	Points
01	Moldova	5	3	6	3	7	2	10
02	Armenia	3	2	13	1	8	3	8
03	Belgium	8	4	4	15	3	6	5
04	Netherlands	6	12	5	10	10	9	2
05	Finland	4	13	15	4	15	12	
06	Greece	11	6	2	14	2	7	4
07	Estonia	7	5	12	5	14	8	3
08	Macedonia	10	14	9	13	13	15	
09	Serbia	15	15	8	7	12	14	
10	Hungary	13	11	7	11	5	11	
11	Belarus	2	1	10	2	6	1	12
12	Russia	12	8	1	6	1	4	7
13	Denmark	14	9	11	12	9	13	
14	Albania	9	7	3	8	4	5	6
15	Romania	1	10	14	9	11	10	1
16	Georgia							

Detailed voting results from Georgia (Final)
R/O	Country	Z. Shengelia	C. Amiranashvili	N. Tatishvili	S. Oqreshidze	S. Gelovani	Jury Rank	Televote Rank	Combined Rank	Points
01	Slovenia	14	12	26	15	20	20	18	21	
02	France	15	10	22	20	19	18	24	24	
03	Israel	16	9	11	26	11	14	11	10	1
04	Estonia	17	8	16	19	21	16	6	9	2
05	United Kingdom	18	7	20	16	22	17	13	15	
06	Armenia	19	20	3	3	2	7	1	1	12
07	Lithuania	20	17	4	4	1	6	9	8	3
08	Serbia	21	11	24	23	23	25	12	19	
09	Norway	22	13	14	13	16	15	23	22	
10	Sweden	1	1	1	2	3	1	7	4	7
11	Cyprus	5	16	12	18	15	13	22	18	
12	Australia	6	14	15	12	12	11	15	11	
13	Belgium	2	2	8	7	6	2	8	5	6
14	Austria	3	3	7	8	10	3	25	13	
15	Greece	23	15	13	21	14	19	10	14	
16	Montenegro	24	26	25	25	18	26	20	25	
17	Germany	9	18	23	14	24	21	14	17	
18	Poland	11	19	17	17	26	22	16	20	
19	Latvia	8	21	9	9	8	10	5	7	4
20	Romania	10	22	21	22	17	23	17	23	
21	Spain	7	5	18	11	13	8	19	12	
22	Hungary	25	6	19	24	25	24	26	26	
23	Georgia									
24	Azerbaijan	13	23	5	1	4	5	3	2	10
25	Russia	26	4	10	10	9	12	2	6	5
26	Albania	12	24	6	6	7	9	21	16	
27	Italy	4	25	2	5	5	4	4	3	8
