= Ethno jazz =

Subgenre of jazz and world music

- Stylistic origins: Jazz, folk, world music
- Cultural origins: 1950s

Ethno jazz, also known as world jazz, is a subgenre of jazz and world music, developed internationally in the 1950s and '60s and broadly characterized by a combination of traditional jazz and non-Western musical elements. Though occasionally equaled to or considered the successor of world music, an independent meaning of ethno jazz emerged around 1990 through the commercial success of ethnic music via globalization, which especially observed a Western focus on Asian musical interpretations. The origin of ethno jazz has widely been credited to saxophonist John Coltrane.

Notable examples of ethno jazz include the emergence of jazz through New Orleanian and Cuban exchange, Afro-Cuban jazz of the 1940s and '50s, and the Arabic influence present in some American jazz from the 1950s and '60s.

== Origins ==
=== Globalization ===
Globalization allowed for the rise of ethno jazz. The Industrial Revolution of the 19th century created new global trade networks that facilitated the spread of cross-cultural phenomena. Philip Bohlman, ethnomusicologist at the University of Chicago, described jazz as the "music of the African Diaspora," describing the movement of ideas between the Caribbean, the United States, and Western Europe. Jazz in America grew out of racial tensions, and was seen by African Americans as a form of resistance. These ideas of resistance were spread and redefined through globalization.

Globalization brought jazz to larger audiences through recordings and touring performances. Examples include a New Orleans band, the "Original Creole Orchestra", which toured Canada for the first time during the fall of 1914, performing at the Pantages Playhouse Theatre in Winnipeg, the first jazz performance outside the United States and the beginning of jazz as an international movement. The Original Dixieland Jazz Band toured Europe in 1919 and was popular enough to continue touring England for a year. Their music spread around the globe. Countries like China began jazz festivals with enough public support to become annual traditions. Musicians outside the United States were gaining popularity as well. One of the most respected non-American jazz musicians was guitarist Jean "Django" Reinhardt, who was born to a Romani family and performed with famous musicians like Arthur Briggs, Bill Coleman, and Bill Arnold. His predominant style of playing was "gypsy jazz". Traveling to and learning from other cultures was another factor that influenced the development of ethno jazz. For example, a variety of musicians like pianist Randy Weston, trumpeter Lester Bowie, drummer Max Roach, and multi-instrumentalists Yusef Lateef and Ornette Coleman had a fascination with other cultures' music. They went to Africa and studied different countries' melodies, rhythms, and harmonies, and adapted them into their jazz playing and compositions. Artists like Wayne Shorter and Marcus Miller found inspiration in the Maghreb jazz from North-West Africa.

Intercultural musical exchange was well received internationally, inspiring many musicians to take on cross-cultural influences. Many of these musicians brought foreign artists as well as their musical styles back to their home countries, which resulted in a number of big jazz names hiring immigrants to perform in their ethno jazz projects.

=== North America ===
John Coltrane is generally understood to be the father of ethno jazz, having incorporated African, Middle Eastern, and Indian musical elements in many of his compositions. One of the first recognized examples of this fusion can be found in the African rhythm of his 1961 track "Dahomey Dance", which Coltrane discovered after a trip to Los Angeles earlier that year. "Amen" and "Sun Ship", recorded four years later and released posthumously on the album Sun Ship, both feature extensive improvisation on commonly used conga and bongo rhythmic patterns, as opposed to more common, chordal improvisation, with the vocal quality of Coltrane's tenor saxophone intentionally paralleling the sound of an African horn he had heard in a Kenyan recording from the late 1930s. His 1967 avant-garde track "Ogunde", named for Nigerian musician Hubert Ogunde, was recorded in the free, lyrical style of the same name, which embodied a movement to return to traditional African music uninfluenced by European elements. Coltrane's Afro-Eastern sound is best exemplified in "Africa", from the album Africa/Brass, which was created after drawing rhythmic and timbral inspiration from many African records.

Coltrane's incorporation of Indian and Middle Eastern styles in his music was more limited, but still prevalent. In 1961, he stated his intention to use the "particular sounds and scales" of India "to produce specific emotional meanings, as in [his own composition] 'India'". Both "Impressions" and the chords of "So What", the all-time most popular jazz track, recorded with Miles Davis, are centered on scales Coltrane invented as a mix of Indian ragas and Western scales. In another collaboration with Miles Davis, Coltrane dropped in on the recording of "Teo", where his playing sounds remarkably more "Middle Eastern" than on previous Davis records, and on the lead sheet to his own composition "All or Nothing At All", Coltrane reportedly handwrote the phrase "Arabic feeling".

=== Latin and South America ===
One of the most popular genres of ethno jazz is Latin jazz, characterized by a combination of jazz elements with traditional Latin American music. In addition, instrumentation plays an important role. While standard jazz bands feature a rhythm section (piano, guitar, bass and drums) and winds (saxophone, trumpet or trombone), Latin music makes use of many more percussive instruments, such as timbales, congas, bongos, maracas, claves, guiros, and vibes, which were first played in a Latin setting by Tito Puente. Musicians combine these two instrumentations to create a Latin jazz sound. Cuba and Brazil were among the first countries to develop this music, and thereby some of the most influential.

==== Cuba ====
Afro-Cuban music developed in Cuba from West African origins, and is characterized by the use of Cuban claves. There are two kinds of clave: the rumba and the son, both of which are typically used in a two-measure pattern in cut time. Both add a base, mood, and flow to the music, creating polyrhythms and asymmetry within their traditional settings. When combined with jazz, which was more symmetrical and featured a heavy back beat, a new Cuban-jazz fusion was created, known as Afro-Cuban jazz or Cubop.

The musicians known for planting the seeds of Cubop were Mario Bauzá, a Cuban trumpeter, and Frank Grillo, a Cuban maraca player who was also known as Machito. Both immigrated to the United States, where they performed Cuban music and were influenced by jazz. One of the most important collaborations was when Bauzá was working with famous jazz trumpeter Dizzy Gillespie. Bauzá introduced Dizzy to Chano Pozo and Chiquitico, conga and bongo players, respectively; together they began a big band that combined jazz and Cuban music. In 1946 they performed the first Afro-Cuban jazz concert in Carnegie Hall. The concert was a sensation because it combined Latin syncopated bass lines, percussion drumming, cross rhythms, and bebop language over a Latin feel. Some of the most famous recordings from this band were "Cuban Be", "Cuban Bop", "Algo Bueno", and "Manteca".

==== Brazil ====
Brazilian jazz has its roots in samba, which comes from a combination of African dances and march rhythms from the 19th century. The samba rhythm is characterized by an emphasis on the second beat of each measure. Unlike Cuban music, this style does not have a clave pattern, resulting in a more relaxed sensation and less tension. Brazilian music was introduced to the United States around the 1930s by Hollywood, with songs like "Tico-Tico no Fubá" and "Brazil", but lost popularity over the coming years until its revival in 1962, when saxophonist Stan Getz and guitarist Charlie Byrd recorded the album Jazz Samba with Verve Records after Byrd was inspired by a trip to Brazil; the track "Desafinado" reached #1 status in the pop charts and won a Grammy for Best Solo Performance.

In the 1950s, pianist Antônio Carlos Jobim, guitarist João Gilberto, and poet Vinicius de Moraes introduced a style similar to samba called bossa nova, which translates to "new flair" or "new beat". This music is slower, text-based, melancholic, and has a mellow feeling. Bossa nova did not use the heavy percussive instruments in samba and was much softer. Gilberto's "Bim-Bom," often described as the first bossa nova song, was inspired by Brazil's post-WWII modernization movement in the 1950s. In 1958, Jobim and de Moraes recorded "Chega de Saudade", but it was Gilberto's version that launched the bossa nova movement. After the release of Jazz Samba, Stan Getz invited Gilberto to record an album together. They released Getz/Gilberto in 1964, which also featured Gilberto's wife, Astrud Gilberto, whose soft vocal style became definitive of bossa nova.

The Bossa Nova era was followed by various trends called Música popular brasileira, including Tropicália begun in Bahia.

=== The Balkans ===
Milcho Leviev was the first composer to definitively bridge Bulgarian folk music and jazz, the synthesis of which is evident in tracks from the early 1960s, such as "Blues in 9" and "Blues in 10", respectively in the 9/8 and 10/8 meters common to Bulgarian folk dances. The former of the two makes use of the provikvane (a Bulgarian folk element characterized by an ascending leap to the leading tone of the scale) and interplay between the two genres via call and response. Throughout "Blues in 9", the call is commonly a modal portion of a Bulgarian folk tune, answered by its response in the style of pentatonic blues.

=== Eastern Europe ===
Jazz was introduced to Moscow by Valentin Parnakh in 1922. This event was followed by the arrest, imprisonment, and deportation of many jazz musicians throughout the Soviet Union for their Western influence, as ordered by Joseph Stalin. This only made the genre more appealing to young musicians, resulting in multiple "underground" jazz bands and orchestras, among the first of which was a handful of Azerbaijani ensembles directed from 1926 by A. Ionannesyani and Mikhail Rol'nikov.

Ethno jazz was more recently represented in the Eurovision Song Contest by Georgia with entries such as "Three Minutes to Earth" by The Shin and Mariko Ebralidze in the 2014 contest and "For You" by Iriao in the 2018 contest.

=== The Middle East ===
Much of the Western music introduced to Iran (and subsequently neighboring Middle Eastern countries) after World War II by the modernization policies of Shah Mohammad Reza Pahlavi was met with censorship similar to that what had occurred in the Soviet Union decades before. Jazz became popular contraband after the 1979 Revolution. In 1994, saxophonist and bandmaster Peter Soleimanipour received the first musical permit after the revolution, which led to public performances of his band Atin, who played jazz standards alongside original compositions that combined Iranian musical elements with jazz. Soleimanipour has described his music as talfiqi (trans. "fusion"), explicitly avoiding the label of "jazz artist", while incorporating African and Latin rhythms, Iranian instrumentation, and jazz elements on works as recent as his 2003 album Egosystem.

== See also ==
- Folk jazz
