= Anri Jokhadze =

Georgian musician and presenter (born 1980)

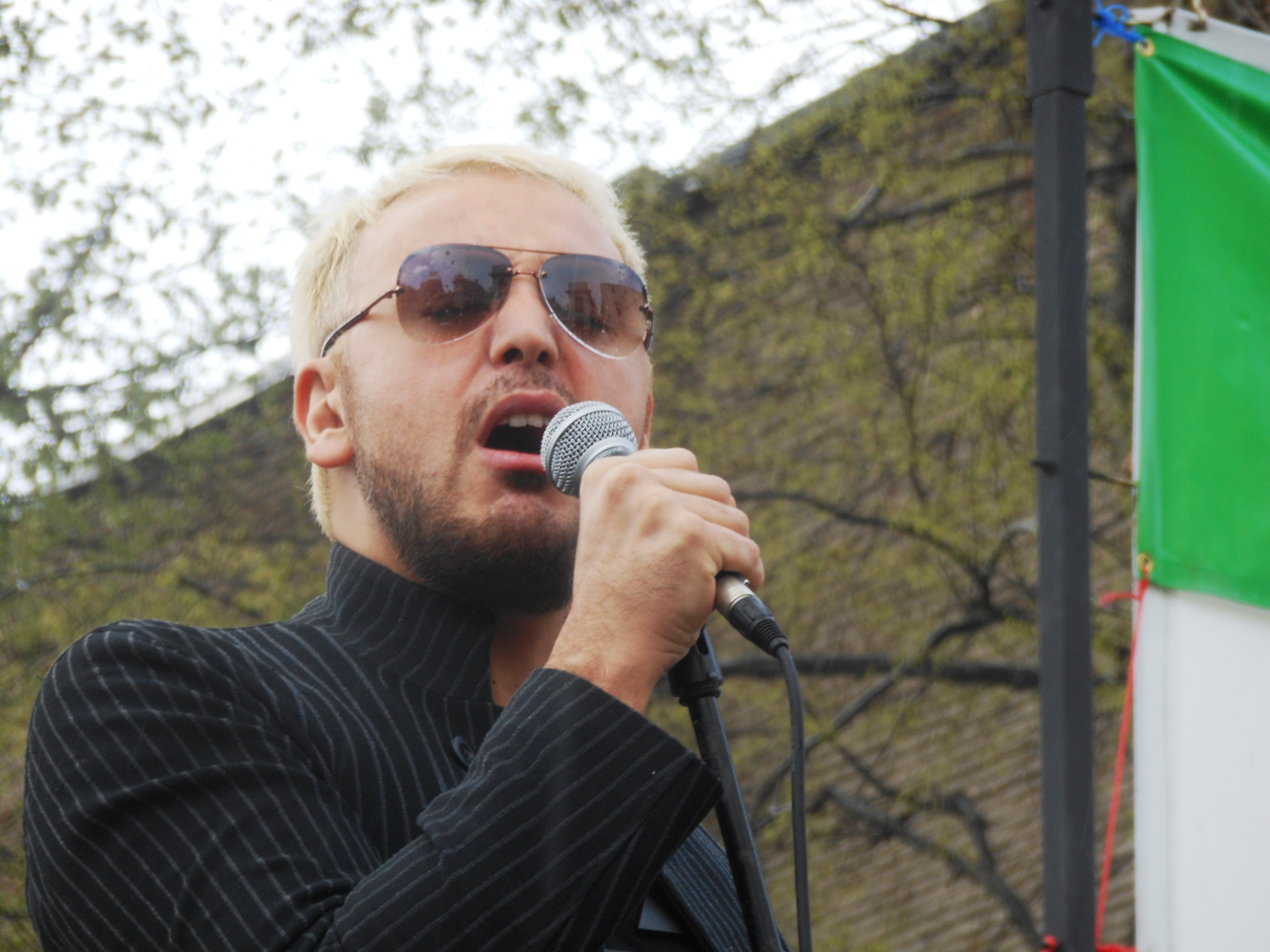
- Anri Jokhadze in 2012

Background information
- Born: 6 November 1980 (age 45); Tbilisi, Georgian SSR
- Genres: Pop, Soul
- Occupations: Singer, composer, music video director, tv presenter, screenwriter
- Instrument: Piano

Anri Jokhadze (Georgian: ანრი ჯოხაძე; born 6 November 1980) is a Georgian pop singer, composer, music video director, TV presenter from Tbilisi, Georgia, who represented Georgia in the Eurovision Song Contest 2012 with the song "I'm a Joker". The singer is a winner and laureate of 13 international contests. Prior to his appearance at the Eurovision Song Contest 2012, Anri Jokhadze has also represented Georgia in the Eurovision Song Contest 2008 as a backing vocalist for Diana Gurtskaya and her song "Peace Will Come." He is also the composer of the Georgian entry at the Eurovision Song Contest 2017, "Keep the Faith" sung by Tamara Gachechiladze.

Anri has been singing since the age of four; he participated in many contests and concerts both in Georgia and abroad. He is the author of songs, and served as a screenwriter of video-clips. Anri is a producer of many newcomer singers.

He started his music career in 1998 and he has won thirteen music awards to date. He also has a title of "The Georgian Golden Voice".

== Discography ==
- Me Maints Moval (2005)
- I Appear on the Stage Again (2006)
- New Songs (2011)

Awards and achievements
| Preceded by Eldrine with "One More Day" | Georgia in the Eurovision Song Contest; 2012 | Succeeded by Nodi Tatishvili & Sophie Gelovani with "Waterfall" |
