= Georgia in the Eurovision Song Contest =

- Eurovision Song Contest
- Participating broadcaster: Georgian Public Broadcaster (GPB)

Participation summary
- Appearances: 18 (8 finals)
- First appearance: 2007
- Highest placement: 9th: 2010, 2011
- Participation history: 2007; 2008; ~~2009~~; 2010; 2011; 2012; 2013; 2014; 2015; 2016; 2017; 2018; 2019; ~~2020~~; 2021; 2022; 2023; 2024; 2025; 2026

Related articles
- Georgian Idol; The Voice Georgia
- Georgia's page at Eurovision.com
- For the most recent participation see Georgia in the Eurovision Song Contest 2026

Georgia has been represented at the Eurovision Song Contest 18 times since making its debut in 2007. The Georgian participating broadcaster in the contest is the Georgian Public Broadcaster (GPB). Georgia has reached the final on eight occasions, achieving two top ten placements, with "Shine" performed by Sofia Nizharadze (2010) and "One More Day" by Eldrine (2011) both finishing ninth.

== Participation ==
The Georgian Public Broadcaster (GPB) is a full member of the European Broadcasting Union (EBU), thus eligible to participate in the Eurovision Song Contest. It has participated in the contest representing Georgia since its 52nd edition in 2007.

== History ==
=== 2000s ===
On 27 October 2006, GPB confirmed that they wished to debut at the Eurovision Song Contest 2007. At that time, the EBU still limited the contest to a maximum of 40 countries, however, in March 2007, it was announced that all 42 applicants would participate in the 2007 contest in Helsinki. At the contest, Georgia managed to progress from the semi-final (where it scored 123 points, finishing 8th), but only came 12th (out of 24) in the final. Georgia appeared for its second time in the contest for 2008, represented by Diana Gurtskaya with the song "Peace Will Come". It had slightly better luck than in 2007, progressing from the semi-final (where it scored 107 points, finishing 5th) and coming in 11th (out of 25) in the final.

Due to the 2008 South Ossetia war, it had been debated by GPB whether it would be present at the 2009 contest in Moscow. GPB chairman stated that it would not be unreasonable to withdraw, but that they were under a time restraint since a national selection event would have to be organised if they chose to participate. On 28 August 2008, GBP announced their intention to withdraw from the 2009 contest, citing that they refuse to compete in a "country that violates human rights and international laws", as well as doubts being cast on the safety of their participants. After winning the Junior Eurovision Song Contest 2008 and getting the maximum 12 points from Russia at the event, they were encouraged to participate again in 2009.

After a national final was held on 18 February 2009 the selected entry for Georgia was decided to be Stephane and 3G with their 1970s-inspired song "We Don't Wanna Put In". However the song gained controversy due to the lyrics of the song, which included perceived political references to Russian Prime Minister Vladimir Putin, which GPB denied. Nevertheless, the EBU banned the song from competing due to its lyrics, and asked GPB to either change the lyrics of the song or select another song to compete. GPB claimed that the EBU's rejection of the song was due to political pressure exerted by Russia, and later withdrew from the contest entirely on 11 March.

=== 2010s ===
Georgia returned to the contest in 2010, and was represented by 23-year-old singer Sofia Nizharadze. Sopho sang the song "Shine" at the contest, written by Hanne Sørvaag, Harry Sommerdahl and Christian Leuzzi. Georgia competed in the second semi-final of the contest on 27 May, performing in the 16th slot, and qualified for the final. Georgia came 9th in the final, with 136 points, achieving their best place so far.

In 2011, Georgia sent the rock band Eldrine to the contest in Düsseldorf, Germany. They managed to equal Sopho Nizharadze's 9th place of the year before. In 2012, Georgia sent Anri Jokhadze to the contest in Baku, Azerbaijan with the song "I'm a Joker", Anri was the first male entrant ever to represent Georgia at Eurovision. On 24 May 2012, he became the first Georgian representative to fail to reach the Eurovision Song Contest final. In 2013, Georgia selected its entry internally. Nodi Tatishvili and Sophie Gelovani was the first duo to represent Georgia in Eurovision. The song was produced by 2012's winning composer Thomas G:son. In the second semi-final Georgia qualified in 10th, and in the final Georgia came in 15th place with 50 points. In 2014, Georgia selected jazz fusion band the Shin alongside vocalist Mariko Ebralidze to the contest in Copenhagen, Denmark. Their song, "Three Minutes to Earth", was panned by critics and placed last in the second semi-final. This is the worst Georgian result to date. In 2015, Georgia held a national final for the first time since 2012. Nina Sublatti and her song "Warrior" were chosen to represent Georgia in the contest. It qualified from the first semi-final. Nina Sublatti eventually reached an 11th place in the grand final. On 15 December 2015, Georgia internally selected Nika Kocharov and Young Georgian Lolitaz to represent Georgia in the 2016 contest. They finished 9th in semi-final and 20th in the grand final. In 2017, GPB went back to an national final, with Tamara Gachechiladze and her song "Keep the Faith" winning the selection. She performed second at the first semi-final, but failed to qualify for the final, finishing 11th with 99 points in the first semi-final.

In 2018, Georgia internally selected Iriao (billed as Ethno-Jazz Group Iriao for the contest) to represent them in Lisbon, Portugal with the song "For You". In spite of its English name, it was their first entry performed entirely in the Georgian language. The song resulted in another non-qualification, with Georgia finishing last in their semi-final once again. For 2019, their act for Tel Aviv was selected through Georgia's Star, the Georgian version of the Pop Idol franchise. The selected artist was Oto Nemsadze with the song "Keep On Going", their second entry that is completely in Georgian, which later failed to reach the final, placing 14th in the first semi-final with 62 points.

=== 2020s ===
Georgia's Star was used once again for 2020, with the chosen artist being Tornike Kipiani with the song "Take Me As I Am". However, the 2020 contest was later cancelled due to the COVID-19 pandemic, and Kipiani was later retained as the Georgian representative for 2021, this time with the song "You". The song failed to qualify for the final, with Georgia finishing 16th in their semi-final. Another internal selection was carried out for 2022, with the band Circus Mircus and their song "Lock Me In" being chosen to represent Georgia; they too failed to qualify for the final, finishing 18th (last) in their semi-final.

For the 2023 contest, Georgia selected the representative through The Voice Georgia, and Iru Khechanovi emerged as winner. Iru's song "Echo", was chosen internally, but she could not manage to qualify to the final either, placing 12th in the second semi-final with 33 points. An internal selection took place to determine Nutsa Buzaladze as the Georgian representative for 2024. Buzaladze ultimately qualified for the final, after 8 years, and finished 21st overall. In 2025 GPB chose Mariam Shengelia through another internal selection with the song "Freedom". The song failed to qualify for the final, with Georgia finishing 15th in their semi-final.

GPB announced that it had internally selected Bzikebi, who had previously won the Junior Eurovision Song Contest 2008, to represent Georgia at the 2026 contest. "On Replay" was their song. The entry resulted in another non-qualification for the country, Georgia finished 15th (last) in their semi-final.

== Participation overview ==
Table key
3	Third place
◁	Last place
◇	Entry selected but did not compete

Year	Artist	Song	Language	Final	Points	Semi	Points
2007	Sopho	"Visionary Dream"	English	12	97	8	123
2008	Diana Gurtskaya	"Peace Will Come"	English	11	83	5	107
2009	Stephane and 3G ◇	"We Don't Wanna Put In" ◇	English ◇	Withdrawn			
2010	Sofia Nizharadze	"Shine"	English	9	136	3	106
2011	Eldrine	"One More Day"	English	9	110	6	74
2012	Anri Jokhadze	"I'm a Joker"	English, Georgian	Failed to qualify		14	36
2013	Nodi Tatishvili and Sophie Gelovani	"Waterfall"	English	15	50	10	63
2014	The Shin and Mariko	"Three Minutes to Earth"	English	Failed to qualify		15 ◁	15
2015	Nina Sublatti	"Warrior"	English	11	51	4	98
2016	Nika Kocharov and Young Georgian Lolitaz	"Midnight Gold"	English	20	104	9	123
2017	Tamara Gachechiladze	"Keep the Faith"	English	Failed to qualify		11	99
2018	Ethno-Jazz Band Iriao	"For You"	Georgian	Failed to qualify		18 ◁	24
2019	Oto Nemsadze	"Keep On Going"	Georgian	Failed to qualify		14	62
2020	Tornike Kipiani ◇	"Take Me as I Am" ◇	English ◇	Contest cancelled (Note: The 2020 contest was cancelled due to the COVID-19 pandemic.)			
2021	Tornike Kipiani	"You"	English	Failed to qualify		16	16
2022	Circus Mircus	"Lock Me In"	English	Failed to qualify		18 ◁	22
2023	Iru	"Echo"	English	Failed to qualify		12	33
2024	Nutsa Buzaladze	"Firefighter"	English	21	34	8	54
2025	Mariam Shengelia	"Freedom"	Georgian, English	Failed to qualify		15	28
2026	Bzikebi	"On Replay"	English	Failed to qualify		15 ◁	5
2027	Confirmed intention to participate †						

== Awards ==
=== Marcel Bezençon Awards ===
Year	Category	Song	Performer	Final	Points	Host city	Ref.
2013	Press Award	"Waterfall"	Nodi Tatishvili and Sophie Gelovani	15	50	(Sweden) Malmö	

=== Barbara Dex Award ===
Year	Performer	Host city	Ref.
2011	Eldrine	(Germany) Düsseldorf	

== Related involvement ==
=== Heads of delegation ===
Year	Head of delegation	Ref.
2018–2024	Natia Mshvenieradze	

=== Commentators and spokespersons ===
Year	Channel	Commentator	Spokesperson	Ref.
2007	Unknown	Unknown	Neli Agirba	
2008	Unknown	Unknown	Tika Patsatsia	
2009	No broadcast		Did not participate	
2010	Unknown	Sopho Altunishvili	Mariam Vashadze	
2011	1TV	Sopho Altunishvili	Sofia Nizharadze	
2012	1TV	Temo Kvirkvelia	Sopho Toroshelidze	
2013	1TV	Temo Kvirkvelia	Liza Tsiklauri	
2014	1TV	Lado Tatishvili and Tamuna Museridze	Sopho Gelovani and Nodiko Tatishvili	
2015	1TV	Lado Tatishvili and Tamuna Museridze	Natia Bunturi	
2016	1TV	Tuta Chkheidze and Nika Katsia	Nina Sublatti	
2017	1TV	Demetre Ergemlidze	Nika Kocharov	
2018	1TV	Demetre Ergemlidze	Tamara Gachechiladze	
2019	1TV	Helen Kalandadze and Gaga Abashidze (all shows); Nodiko Tatishvili (final)	Gaga Abashidze	
2020	Not announced before cancellation			N/A
2021	1TV	Nika Lobiladze	Oto Nemsadze	
2022	1TV	Nika Lobiladze	None (Note: Helen Kalandadze was supposed to announce the results, but due to alleged technical difficulties, the contest's executive supervisor Martin Österdahl announced them instead.)	
2023	1TV	Nika Lobiladze	Archil Sulakvelidze	
2024	1TV	Nika Lobiladze	Sopho Khalvashi	
2025	1TV	Nika Lobiladze	Nutsa Buzaladze	
2026	1TV (all shows); Georgian Radio (SF1)	Unknown	Mariam Shengelia	

==== Other shows ====
Show	Commentator	Channel	Ref.
Eurovision: Europe Shine a Light	Demetre Ergemlidze	1TV	

== Photo gallery ==
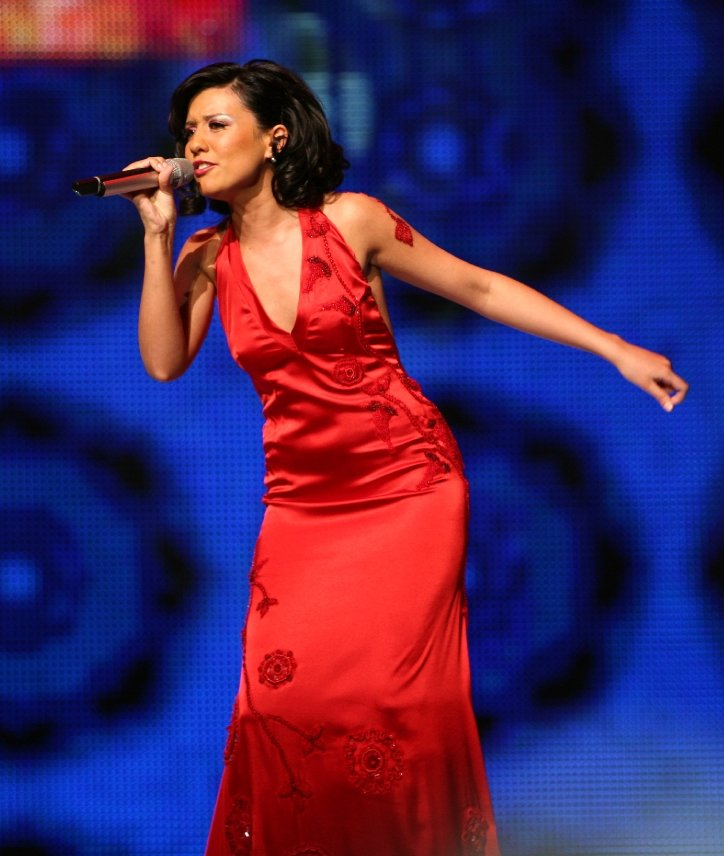
Sopho Khalvashi in Helsinki (2007)

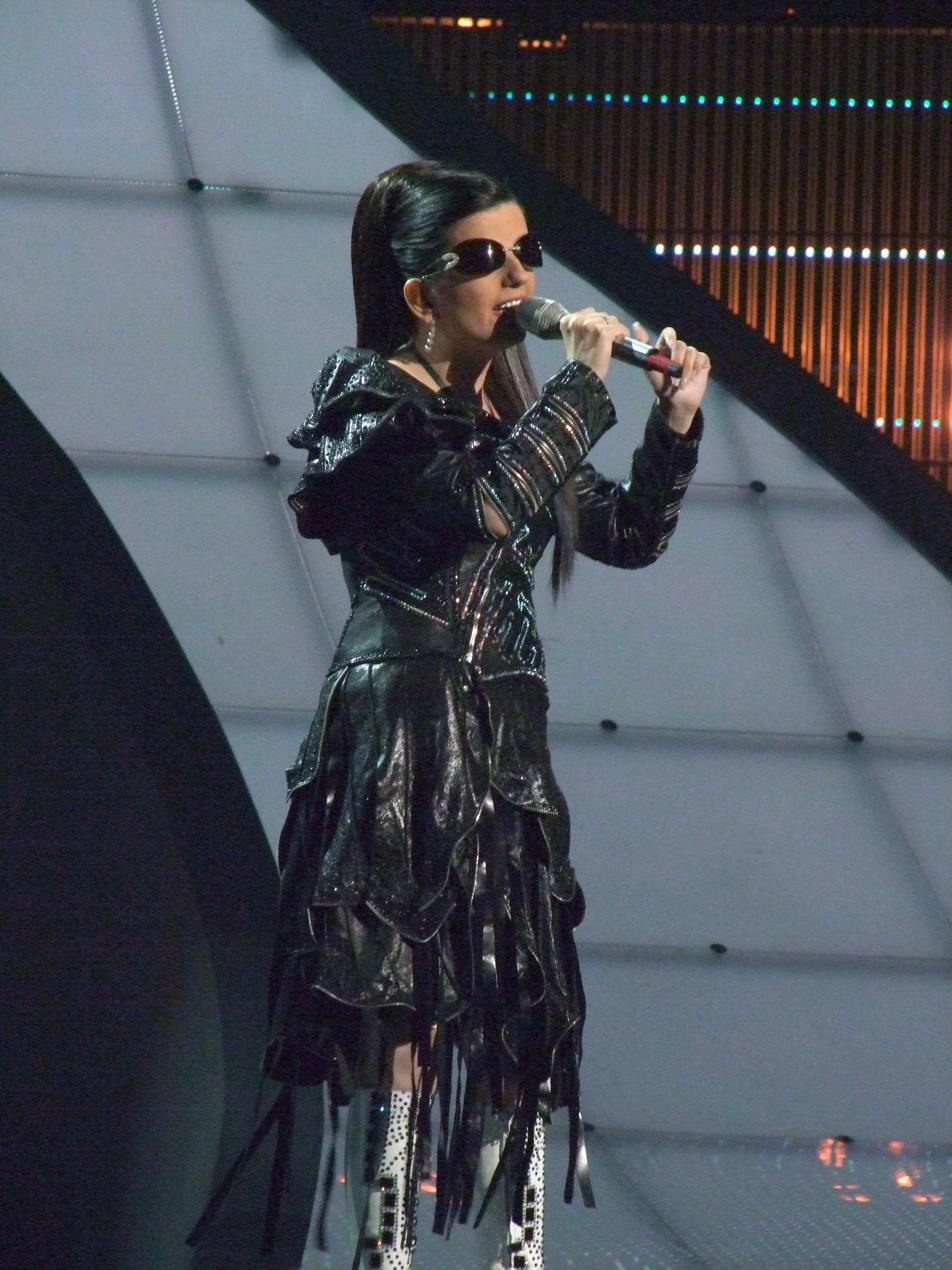
Diana Gurtskaya in Belgrade (2008)

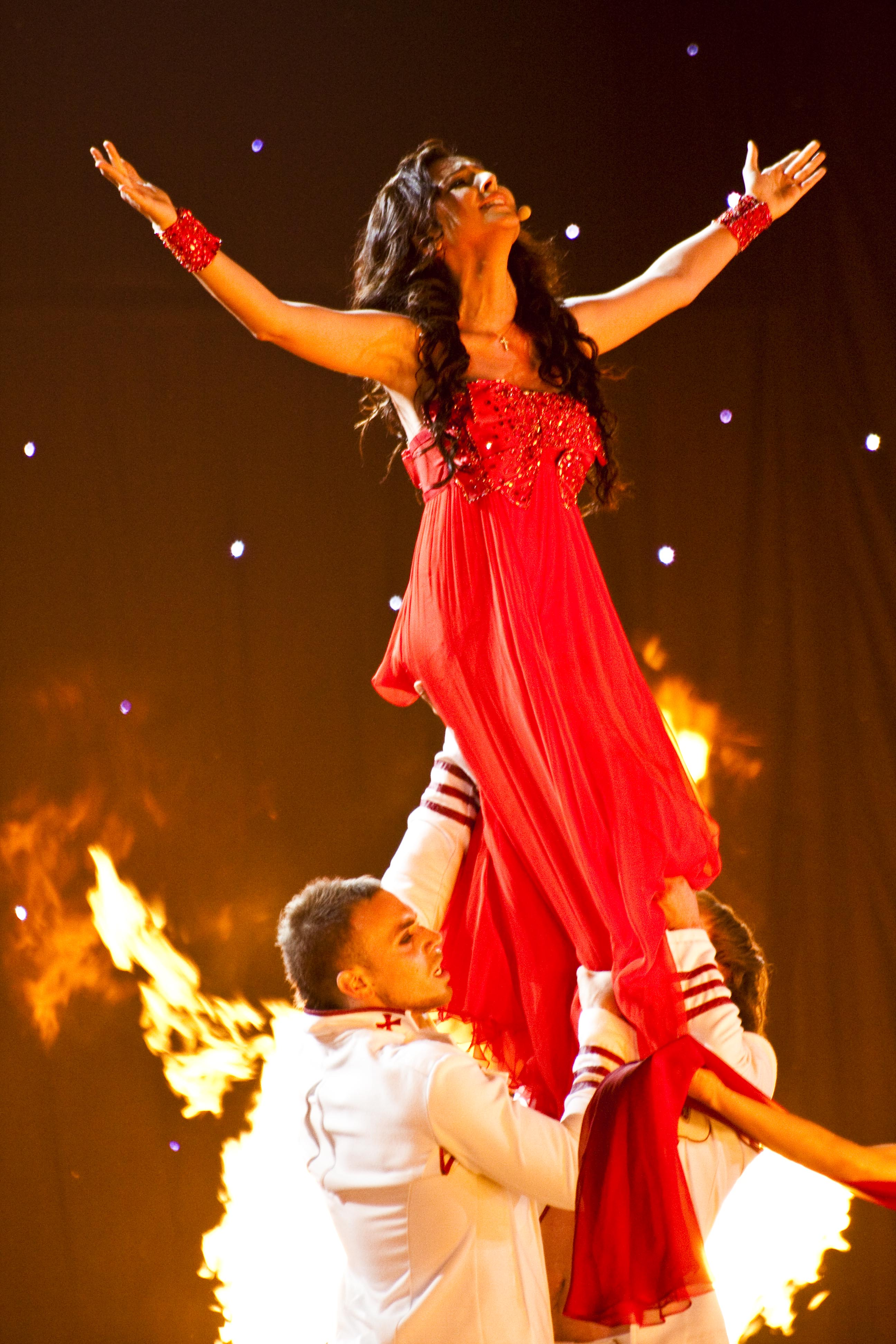
Sopho Nizharadze in Oslo (2010)

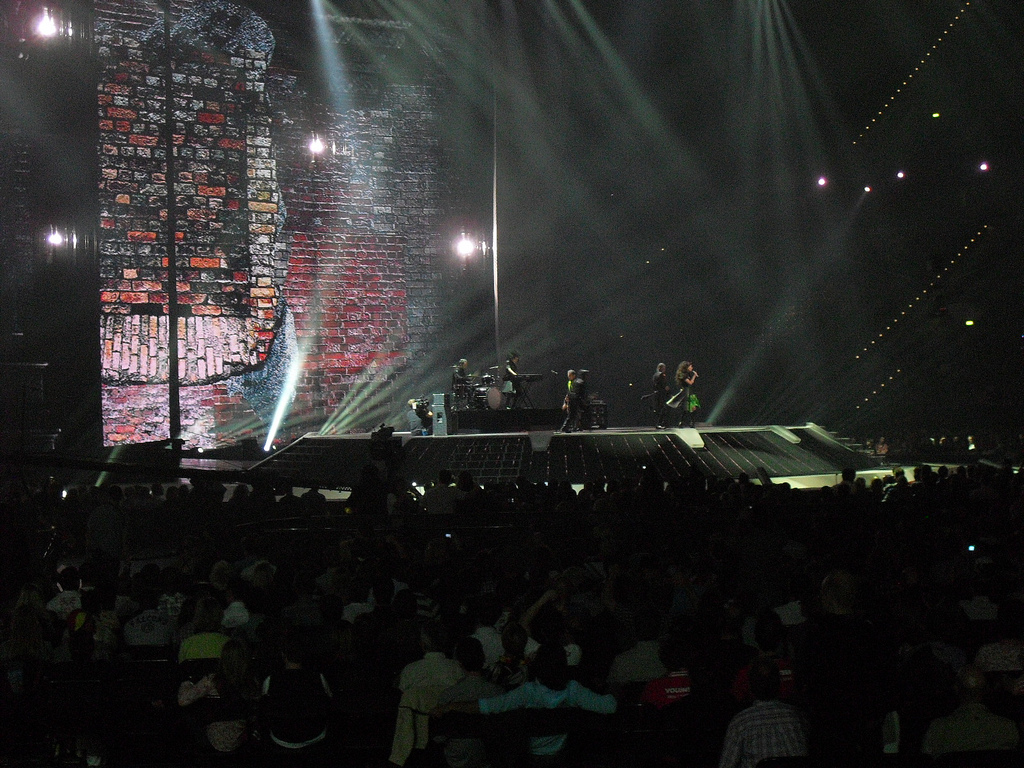
Eldrine in Düsseldorf (2011)

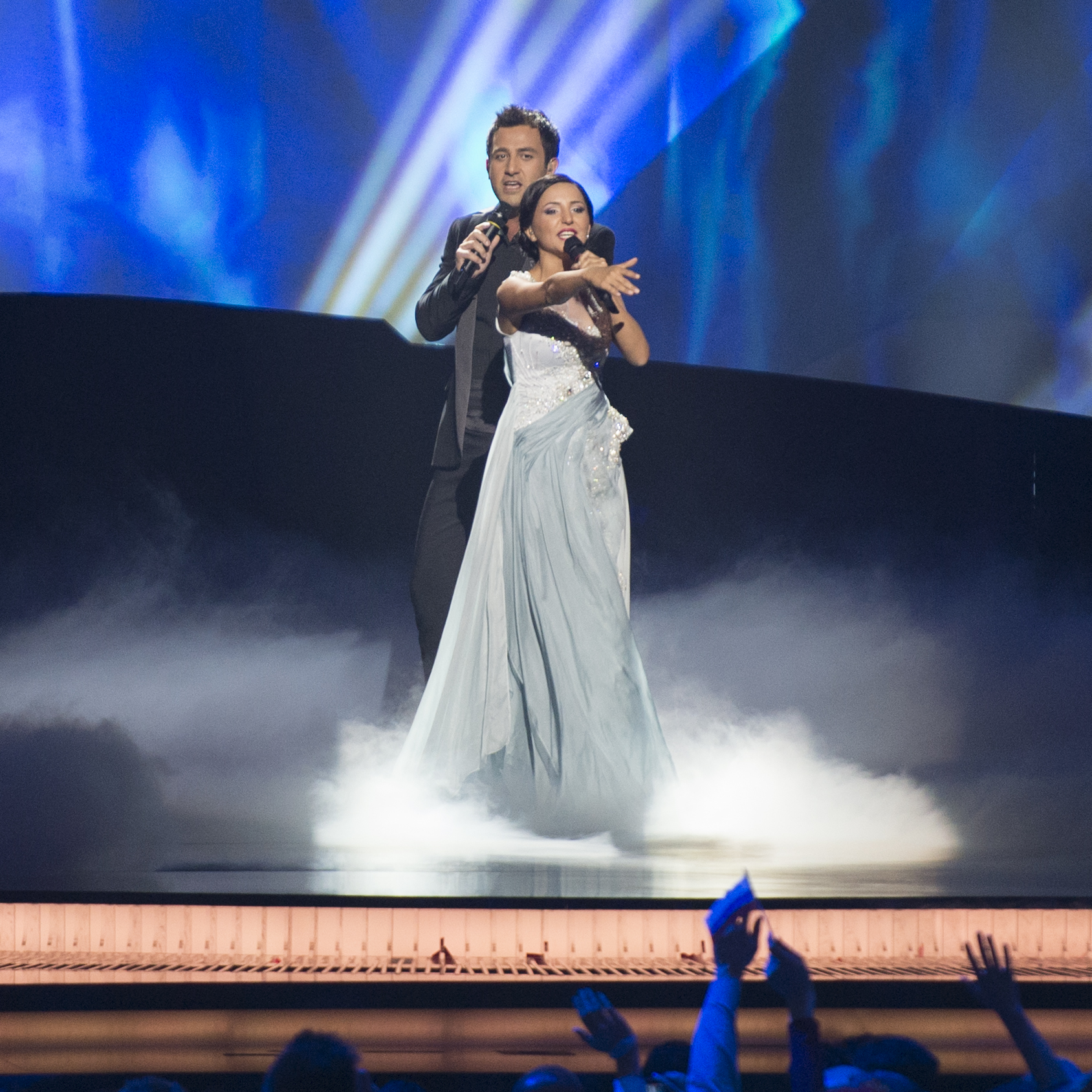
Nodi Tatishvili and Sophie Gelovani in Malmö (2013)

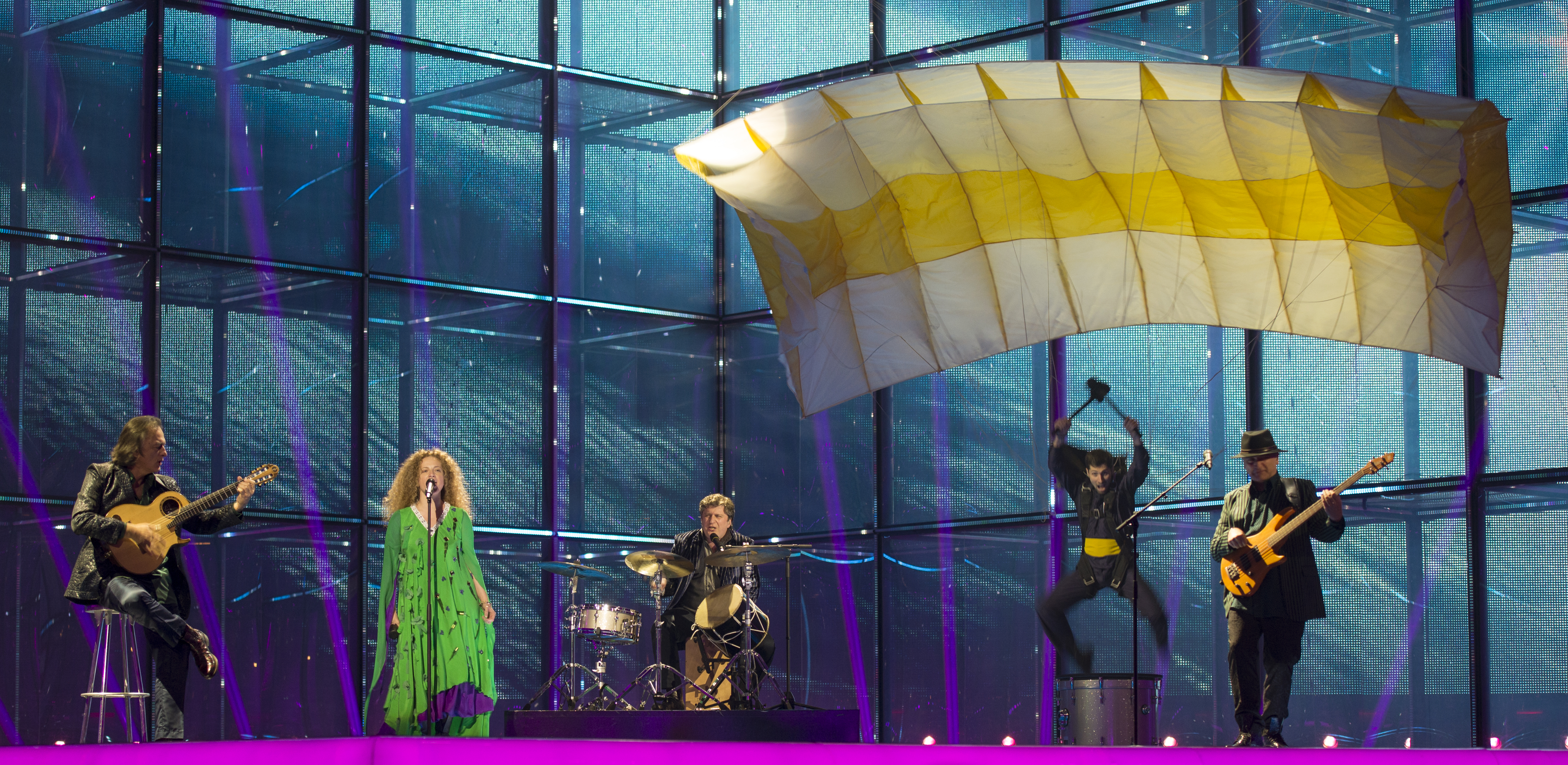
The Shin and Mariko in Copenhagen (2014)

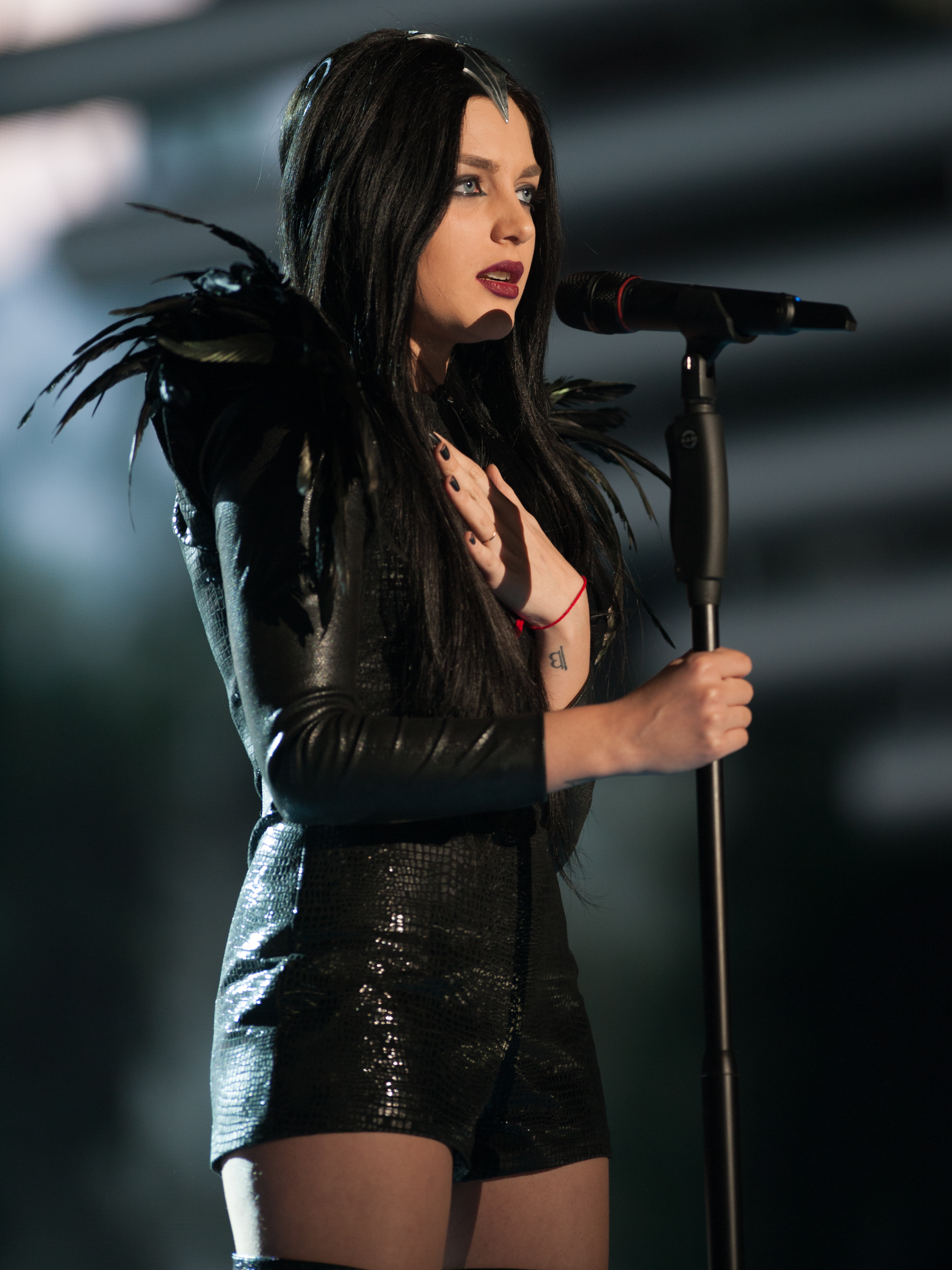
Nina Sublatti in Vienna (2015)

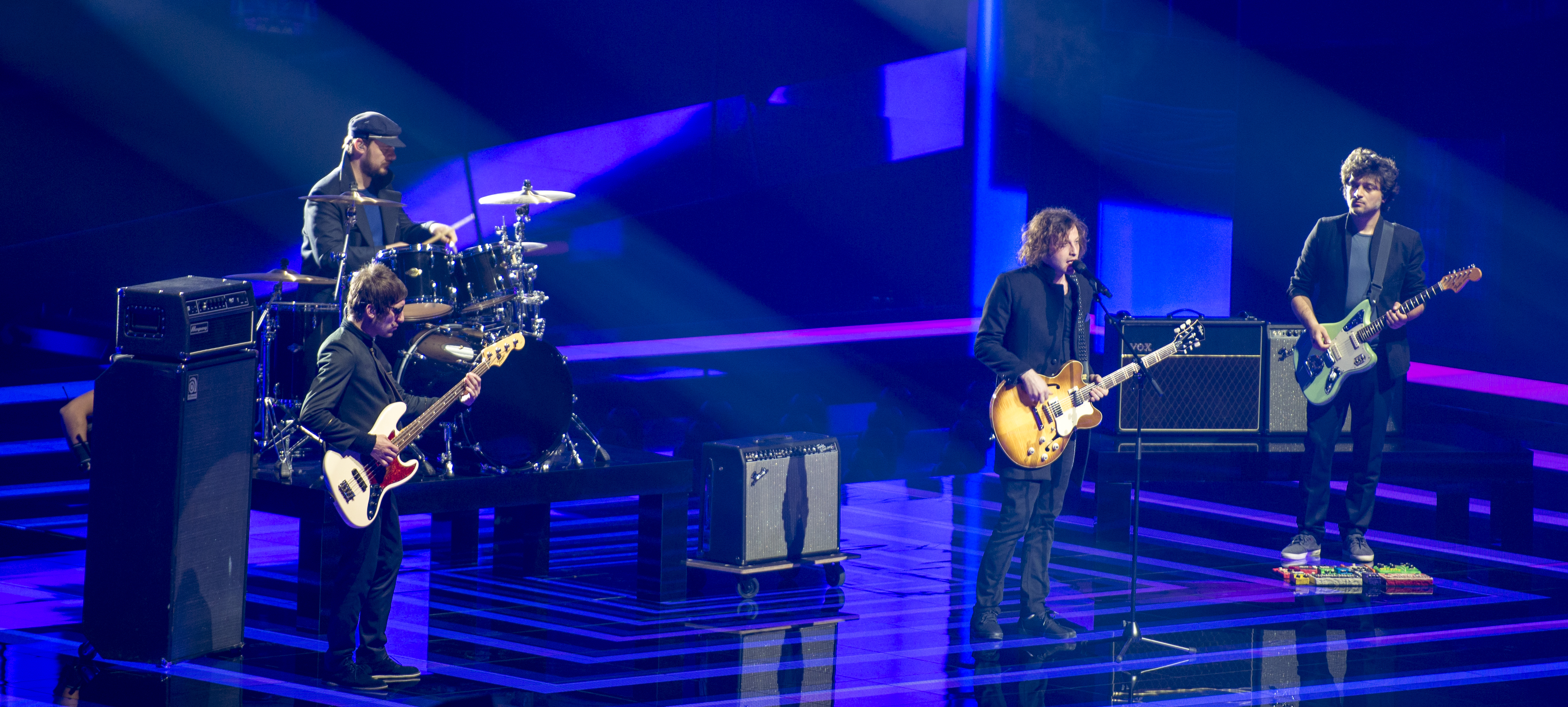
Nika Kocharov and Young Georgian Lolitaz in Stockholm (2016)

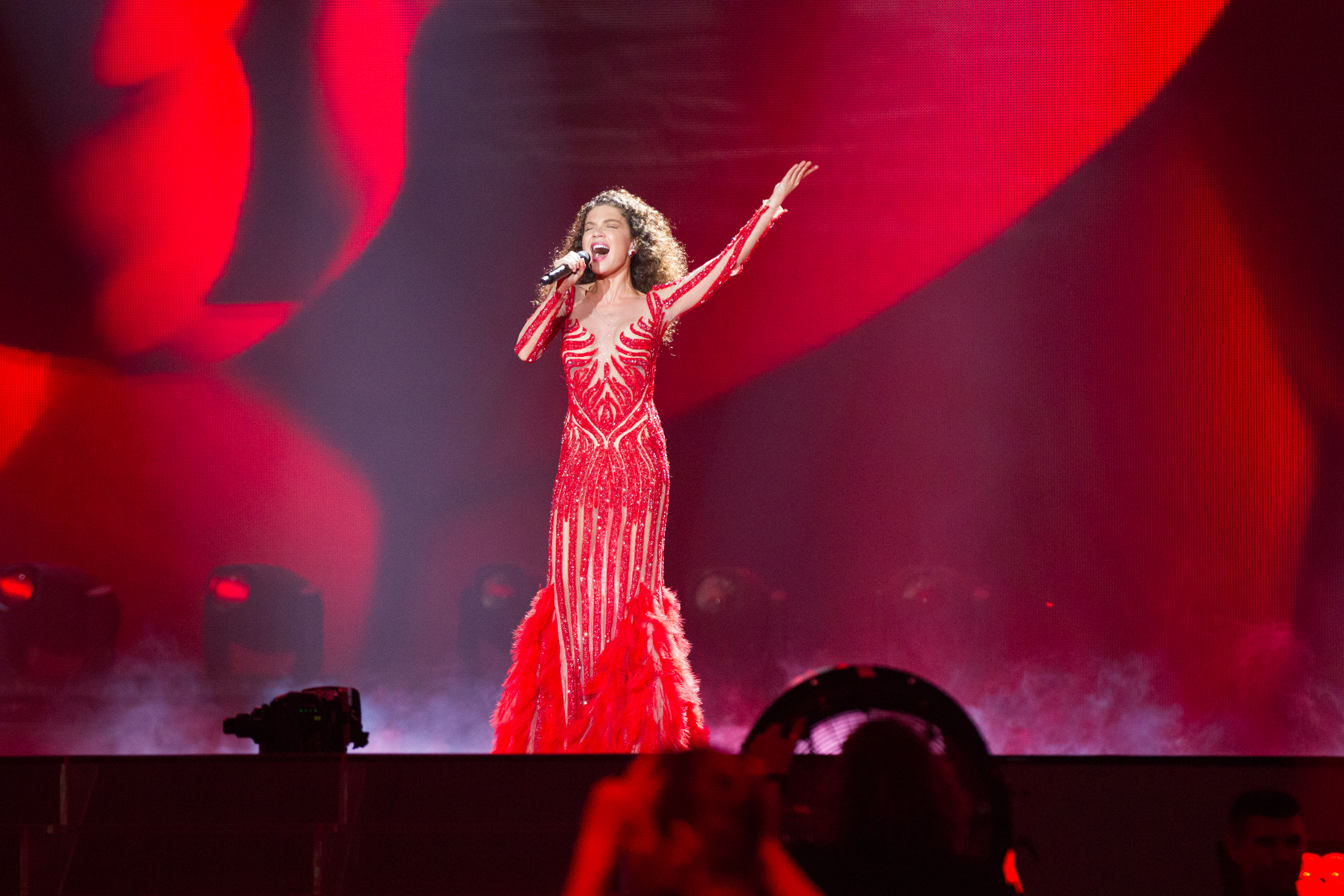
Tamara Gachechiladze in Kyiv (2017)

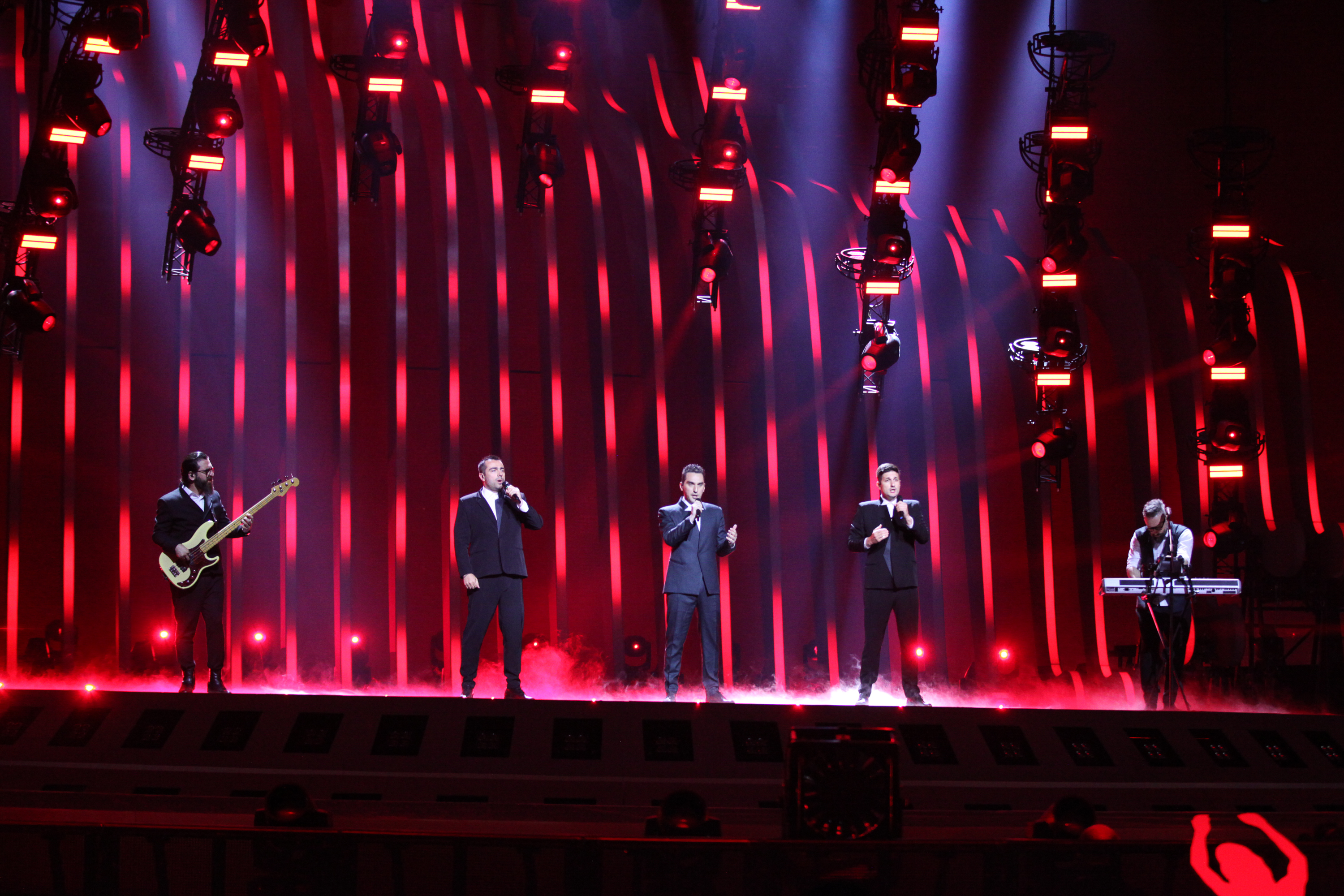
Ethno-Jazz Band Iriao in Lisbon (2018)

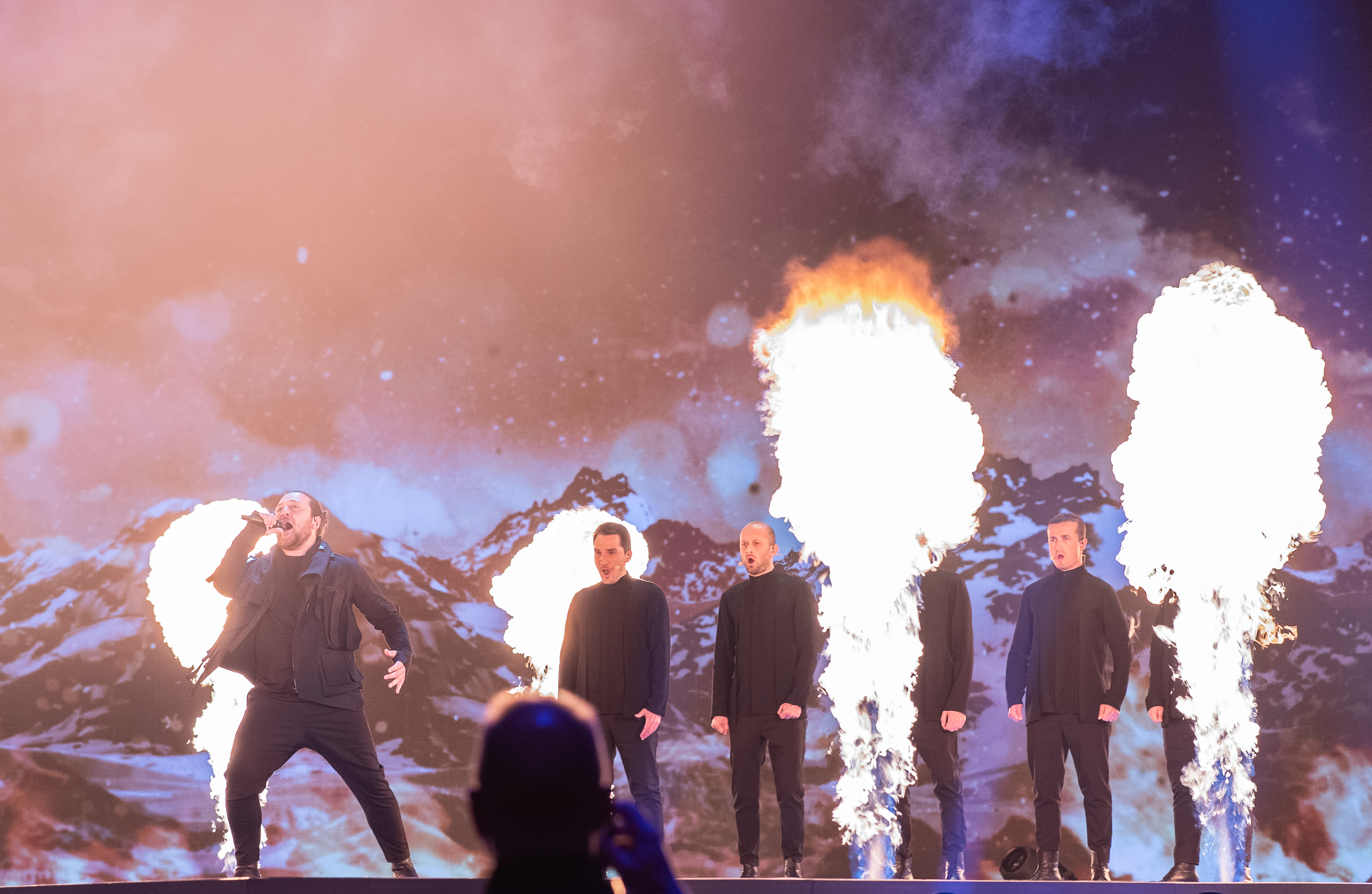
Oto Nemsadze in Tel Aviv (2019)

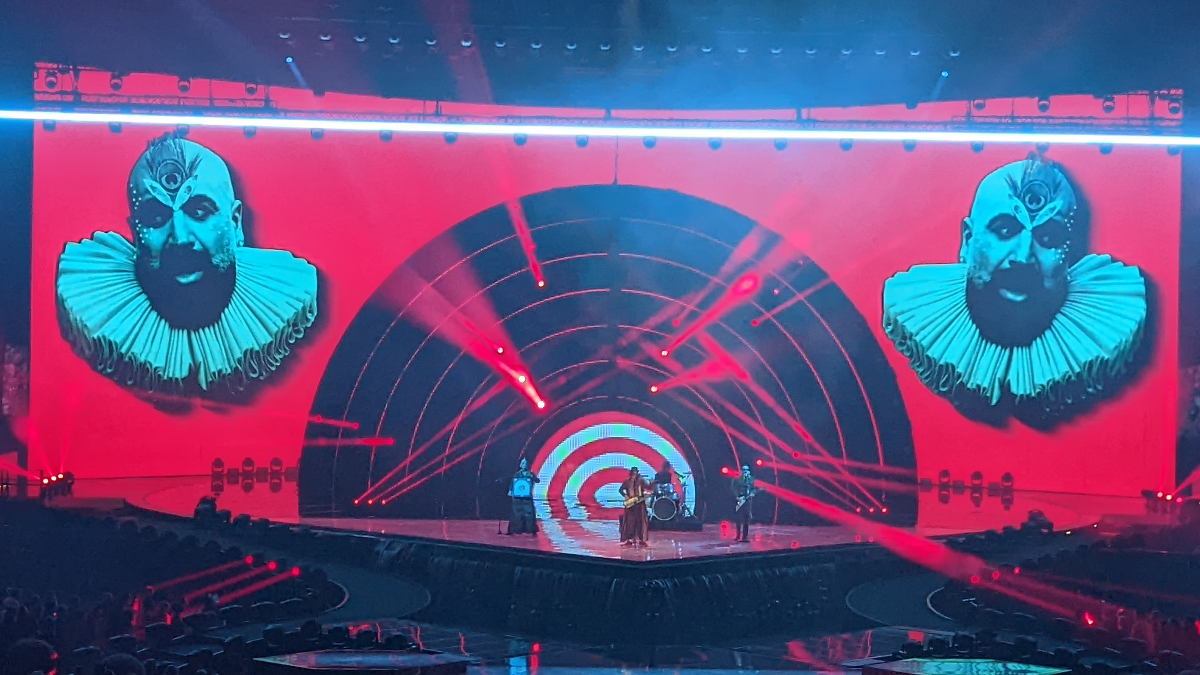
Circus Mircus in Turin (2022)

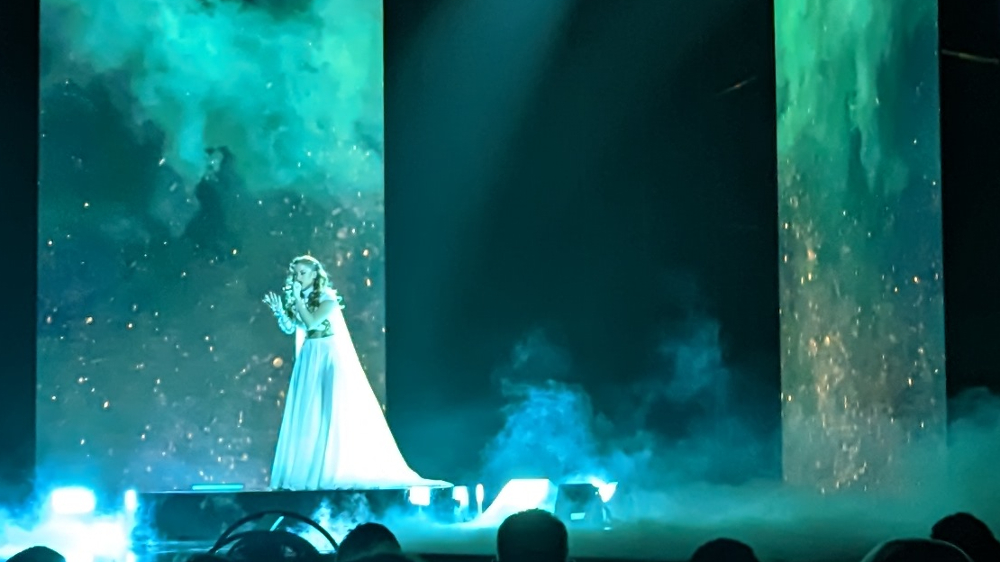
Iru in Liverpool (2023)

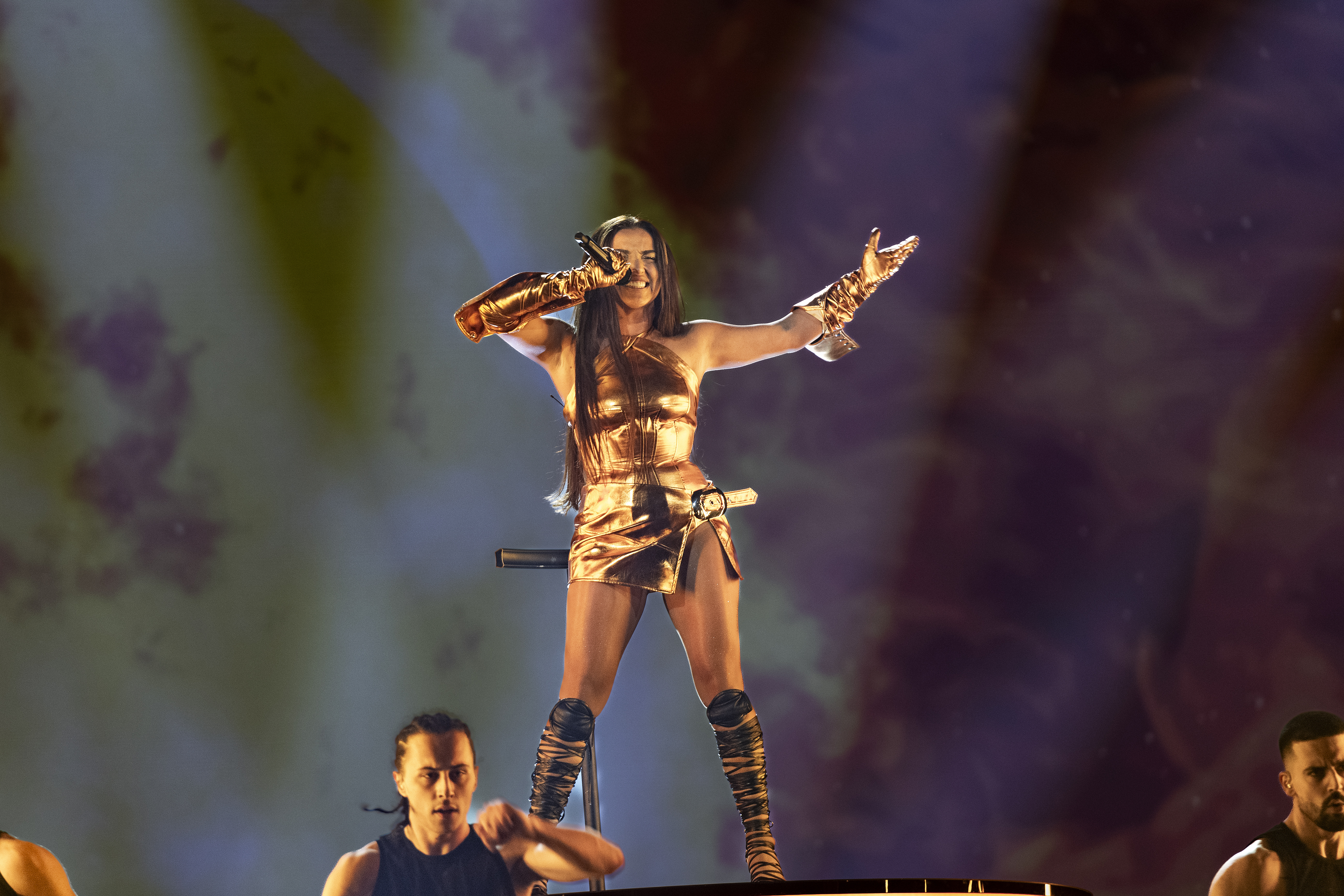
Nutsa Buzaladze in Malmö (2024)

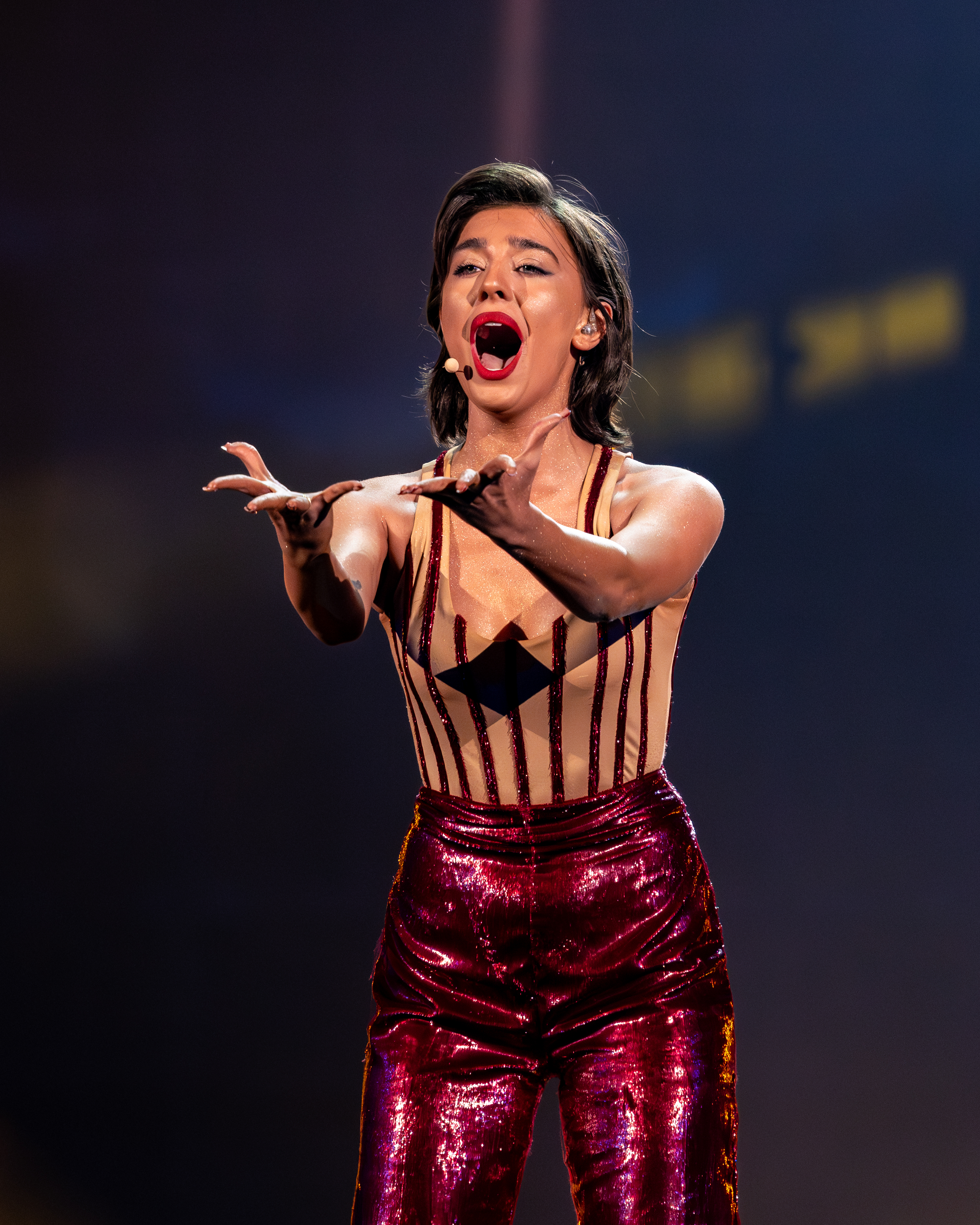
Mariam Shengelia in Basel (2025)

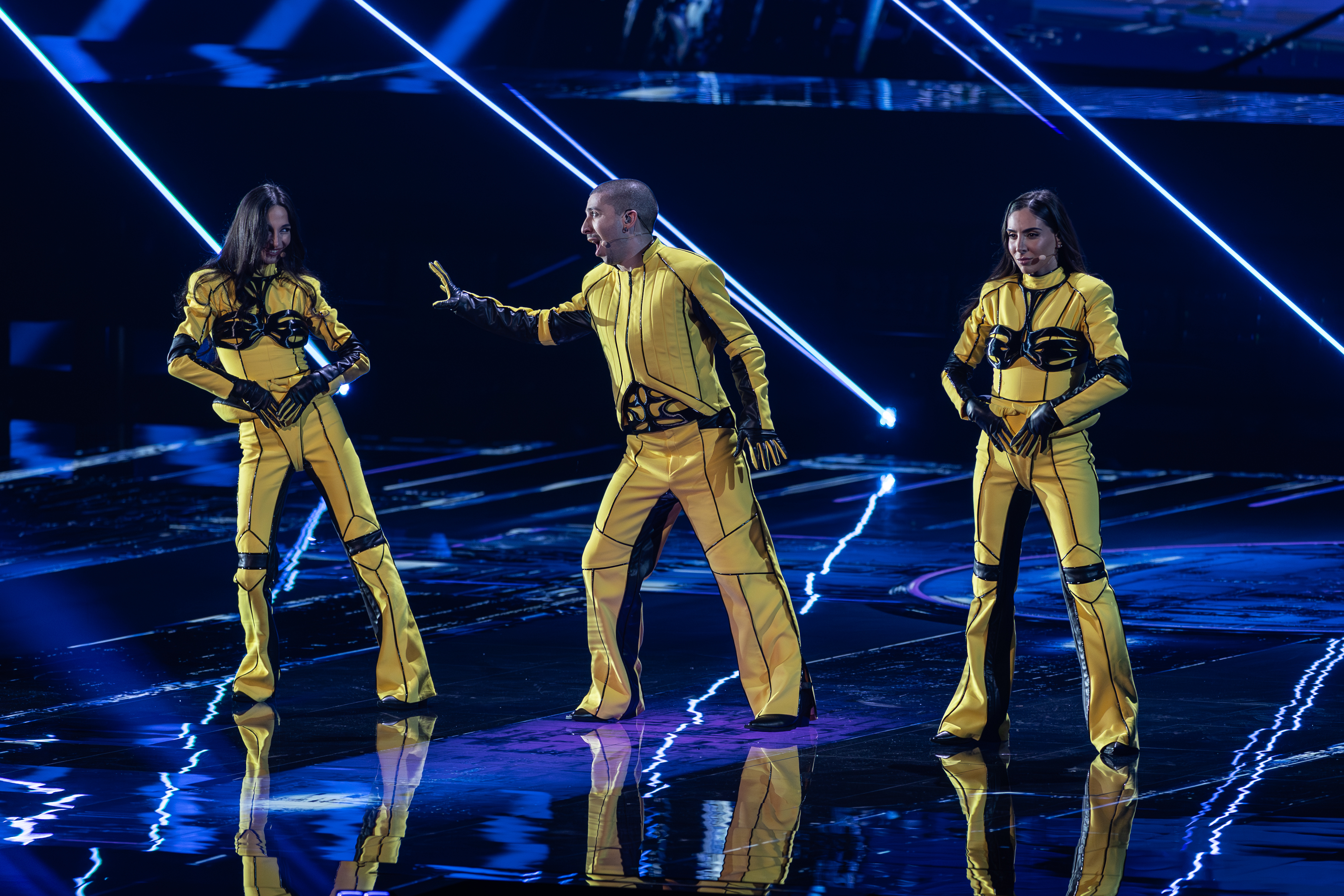
Bzikebi in Vienna (2026)

== See also ==
- Georgia in the Junior Eurovision Song Contest
