= Sergi Gvarjaladze =

Georgian film director, broadcaster and musician

Sergi Gvarjaladze (Georgian: სერგი გვარჯალაძე; born November 13, 1967) is a Georgian TV and radio presenter, film director, producer and musician whose career in the Georgian media spans 20 years. He has been involved in the commercial production of a number of projects of a social nature. He is a German citizen and has worked in the German music industry since 1994 while studying at the University of Münster. He lives in, and divides his time between both Georgia and Germany.

== Television and film ==
In Georgia, Gvarjaladze was involved with the Channel 1 show Extremely Popular from 1990 to 1991. He made a social documentary on the Georgian Civil War in 1991 with American cameraman Charly Steiner. He also worked on Showbiz Digest (Channel 2, 1991–93) and Komunikatori (Channel 1, 1999; TV Rustavi2, 2000).

His latest film Dancing with Georgia (Tańcząca z Gruzją) was broadcast on TVP2 (the second channel of Polish television).

== Music ==
He has been producing and presenting radio programs since 1994. His music projects include Georgian alternative rock and electronic bands Sakhli, Genetic Code, Georgian Dance Empire, and Bibi da Sergi. He currently works on two different music projects as Sir G (electronic music) and John Jolly (indie pop). He was commissioned to produce "Electronauts", a documentary on Georgian electronic music. From 2006 to 2007 he was the editor-in-chief of the first Georgian music monthly magazine O3 (Ozone).

== Other projects ==
In September 2005, Open Society–Georgia invited him to be a consultant to the Foundation's project "Assistance to the Unemployed Citizens of Georgia". Since January 2007, he has been consulting with the Georgian Department of Tourism and Resorts.

He managed the Georgian Society for Performing and Reproduction Rights (1997) and was chairman of the Georgian Copyright Association (GECA). In 2002, he was one of the founders of European House, an independent NGO/think tank promoting the goal of Georgia's accession into the European Union.

In 2018 he served as special advisor to the Mayor of Tbilisi and the Head of the Tbilisi Nighttime Economy Project.
