= Nodiko Tatishvili =

Georgian singer (born 1986)

Nodiko Tatishvili ნოდიკო ტატიშვილი
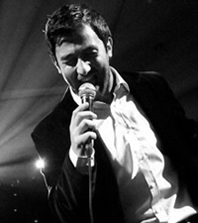

Background information
- Born: November 5, 1986 (age 39)
- Origin: Tbilisi, Georgian SSR, Soviet Union
- Genres: Pop, Soul
- Occupation: Singer
- Years active: 2005–present

Nodiko "Nodar" Tatishvili (Georgian: ნოდიკო "ნოდარ" ტატიშვილი) (born November 5, 1986) is a Georgian singer.

== Biography ==
He was six years old when he made his first appearance in the Tbilisi Great Concert Hall. He was a soloist of children ensemble. At the age of eight, he won the national contest and already at age nine singing with the ensemble Iveria in the musical Two Dwarfs. During the "mutation period" Nodiko took a part in the television project "School of Nutsa" and after that many popular composers and musicians. In the periods from 2005 to 2009, Nodiko has participated in many prestigious music festivals and projects, but in 2009 he was featured in the popular Georgian TV show Geostar, where he won and became GEOSTAR 2009 (pop idol 2009).

He and Sopho Gelovani represented Georgia in the Eurovision Song Contest 2013 in Malmö, Sweden. In the Eurovision Song Contest 2015 in Vienna, Austria, he and Sophie Gelovani were two of the five members of the Georgian jury. In December 2016 his new song “Color Day” was released. In 2017, he and Sopho Gelovani hosted the national final for the Eurovision Song Contest. He did concerts in Germany and Greece. At the Radio Holding Fortuna Music Awards he was chosen Best Male Artist of the year.

== Awards ==
- 2005 – International Music Festival Palanga 2005, Lithuania
- 2005 – The Amber Star, Lithuania
- 2007 – international Song Contest "Astana 2007", Kazakhstan
- 2007 – Shanghai-Malaysian International Song contest, awarded as The Best Male Voice, Malaysia
- 2008 – "Slaviansky Bazar", Awarded for the second place, Belarus
- 2009 – International Song Contest "Golden Voices", awarded for the third place, Moldova
- 2009 – Geostar, Winner of the Project, Georgia

== See also ==
- Geostar

Awards and achievements
Preceded by Giorgi Sukhitashvili	Geostar winner 2009	Succeeded by Otar Nemsadze
Preceded by Anri Jokhadze with "I'm a Joker"	Georgia in the Eurovision Song Contest with Sophie Gelovani; 2013	Succeeded by The Shin and Mariko with "Three Minutes to Earth"
