= The Shin =

Georgian band

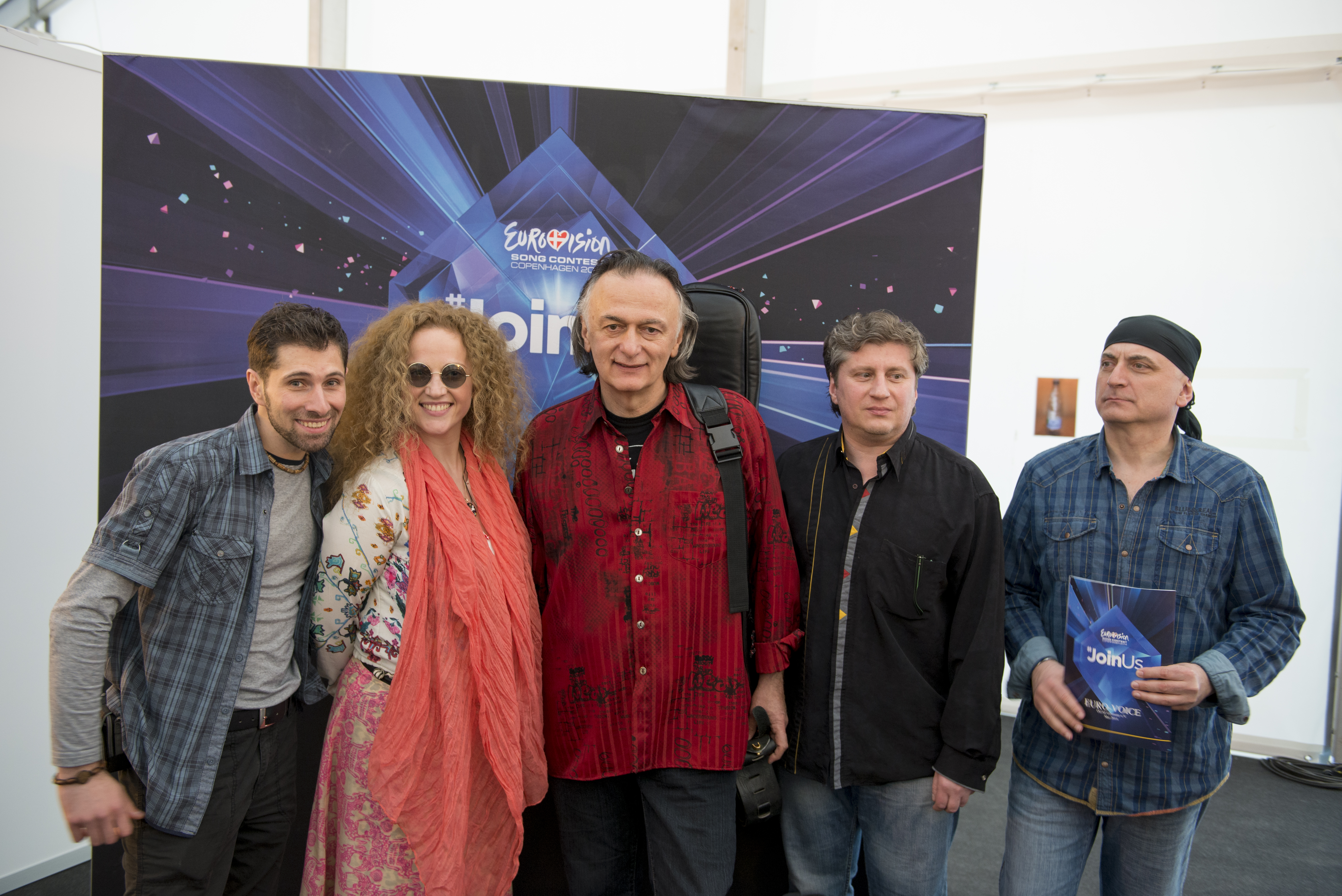
- The Shin and Mariko (2014)

Background information
- Origin: Tbilisi, Georgia
- Genres: Jazz rock, folk rock, ethno-rock, ibero caucasian style
- Years active: 1998–present
- Labels: JARO; BBB Music
- Members: Zaza Miminoshvili: Zurab Gagnidze
- Past members: Mamuka Ghaganidze
- Website: www.the-shin.com

The Shin (Georgian: შინ) is a Georgian jazz rock band formed in Germany in 1998. The music of The Shin smoothly combines Georgian folk melodies with jazz rock, famous native polyphonic singing with scat, and tunes of the near Orient and flamenco with a modern Western sound. The Shin was founded by Zaza Miminoshvili (guitars, panduri) and Zurab Gagnidze (bass, vocals), and joined by Mamuka Ghaganidze (vocals, percussion) in 2002. Ghaganidze died from skin cancer in August 2019.

The group represented Georgia in the Eurovision Song Contest 2014 along with singer Mariko Ebralidze with the song "Three Minutes to Earth", but they came in last place in their semi-final and did not advance.

The word "Shin" literally means "home" or "going home" in the Georgian language.

== Discography ==
Year	Label	Title
1999	Acoustic Music Records (Germany)	Tseruli
2005	BBB Music (Germany)	Manytimer
2006	JARO Medien (Germany)	EgAri
2009	JARO Medien (Germany)	Black Sea Fire
2009	Pasaules mūzika (Latvia)	Es Ari

Awards and achievements
Preceded by Nodi Tatishvili & Sophie Gelovani with "Waterfall"	Georgia in the Eurovision Song Contest with Mariko; 2014	Succeeded by Nina Sublatti with "Warrior"
