= Sopho Gelovani =

Sopho Gelovani სოფო გელოვანი
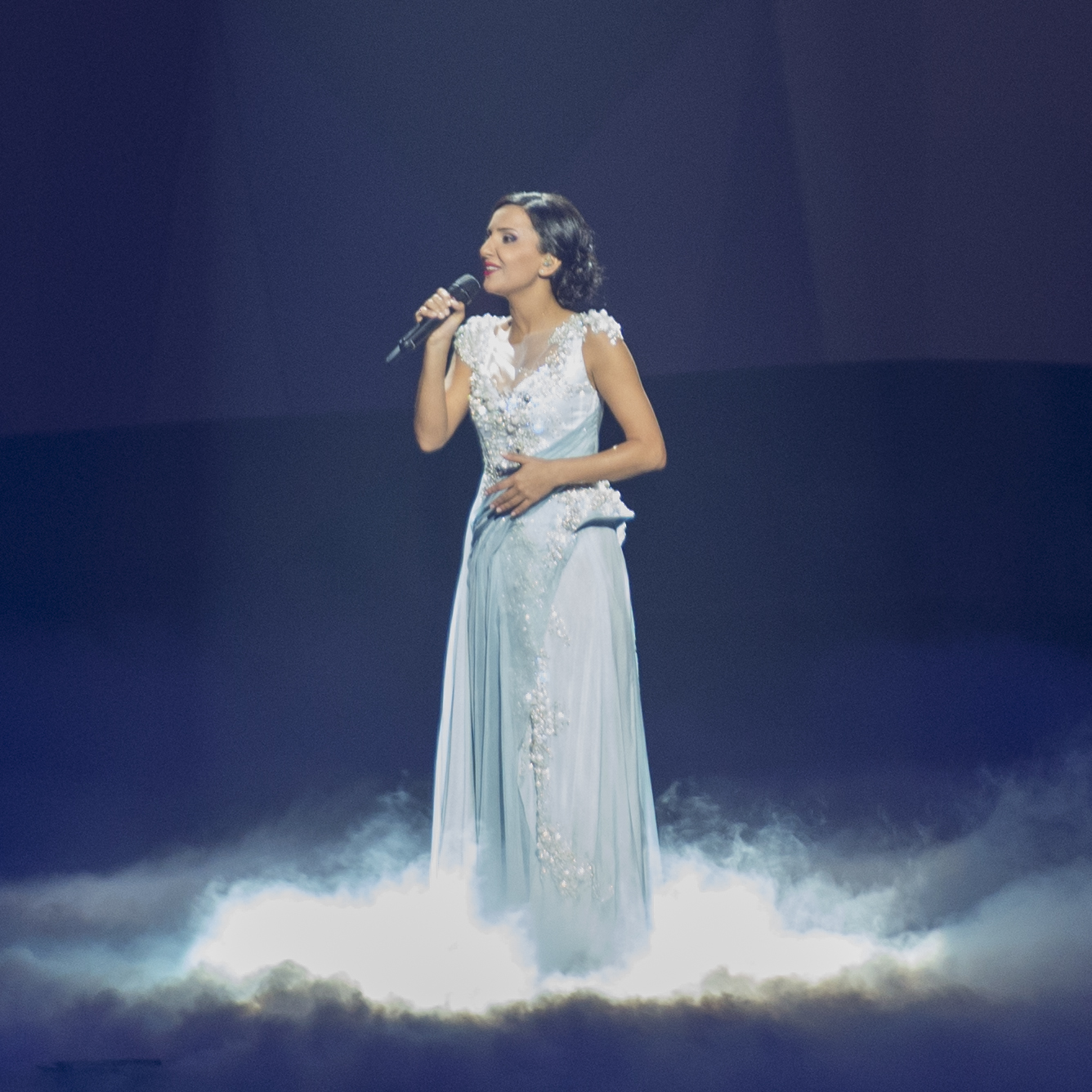
- Sopho Gelovani (2013)

Background information
- Born: 21 March 1984 (age 42); Tbilisi, Georgian SSR, Soviet Union
- Years active: 2010–present

Sopho Gelovani (Georgian: სოფო გელოვანი) (born 21 March 1984) also known as Sophie Gelovani is a Georgian singer. She and Nodiko Tatishvili represented Georgia in the Eurovision Song Contest 2013 in Malmö, Sweden.

Awards and achievements
Preceded by Anri Jokhadze with "I'm a Joker"	Georgia in the Eurovision Song Contest with Nodi Tatishvili; 2013	Succeeded by The Shin and Mariko with "Three Minutes to Earth"
