= Georgia in the Eurovision Song Contest 2014 =

- Eurovision Song Contest 2014
- Participating broadcaster: Georgian Public Broadcaster (GPB)
- Country: Georgia
- Selection process: Internal selection
- Announcement date: Artist: 4 February 2014; Song: 14 March 2014

Competing entry
- Song: "Three Minutes to Earth"
- Artist: The Shin and Mariko
- Songwriters: Zaza Miminoshvili; Eugen Eliu

Placement
- Semi-final result: Failed to qualify (15th)

Participation chronology

Georgia was represented at the Eurovision Song Contest 2014 with the song "Three Minutes to Earth", written by Zaza Miminoshvili and Eugen Eliu, and performed by the Shin and Mariko. The Georgian participating broadcaster, Georgian Public Broadcaster (GPB), internally selected its entry for the contest in February 2014. "Three Minutes to Earth" was presented to the public on 14 March 2014.

Georgia was drawn to compete in the second semi-final of the Eurovision Song Contest which took place on 8 May 2014. Performing during the show in position 4, "Three Minutes to Earth" was not announced among the top 10 entries of the second semi-final and therefore did not qualify to compete in the final. It was later revealed that Georgia placed fifteenth (last) out of the 15 participating countries in the semi-final with 15 points.

== Background ==
Prior to the 2014 contest, Georgia had participated in the Eurovision Song Contest six times since their first entry in 2007. The nation's highest placing in the contest, to this point, has been ninth place, which was achieved on two occasions: in 2010 with the song "Shine" performed by Sofia Nizharadze and in 2011 with the song "One More Day" performed by Eldrine. The nation briefly withdrew from the contest in 2009 after the European Broadcasting Union (EBU) rejected the Georgian entry, "We Don't Wanna Put In", for perceived political references to Vladimir Putin who was the Russian Prime Minister at the time. The withdrawal and fallout was tied to tense relations between Georgia and then host country Russia, which stemmed from the 2008 Russo-Georgian War. Following the introduction of semi-finals, Georgia has, to this point, failed to qualify to the final on only one occasion. In 2013, Georgia qualified to the final where the country placed 15th with the song "Waterfall" performed by Nodi Tatishvili and Sophie Gelovani.

The Georgian national broadcaster, Georgian Public Broadcaster (GPB), broadcasts the event within Georgia and organises the selection process for the nation's entry. GPB confirmed their intentions to participate at the 2014 Eurovision Song Contest on 16 July 2013. Georgia has selected their entry for the Eurovision Song Contest both through national finals and internal selections in the past. In 2013, GPB opted to internally select the Georgian entry, a method which was continued for their 2014 participation.

== Before Eurovision ==
=== Internal selection ===
The Georgian entry for the Eurovision Song Contest 2014 was internally selected by an expert commission consisting of GPB producers. On 4 February 2014, the broadcaster held a press conference at the Assembly Hall in Tbilisi where 2013 Georgian Eurovision entrants Nodi Tatishvili and Sophie Gelovani announced that the band The Shin and singer Mariko Ebralidze would represent Georgia in Copenhagen. The song "Three Minutes to Earth", composed by member of The Shin Zaza Miminoshvili with lyrics by Eugen Eliu, was recorded in late February 2014 at the scb-music Studios in Stuttgart and premiered on 14 March 2014 together with the music video on the GPB First Channel programme Day. The music video was filmed at the Natakhtari Airfield in Natakhtari, Mtskheta-Mtianeti and was directed by Basa Potskhishvili.

== At Eurovision ==
The Shin and Mariko presenting themselves at the contest

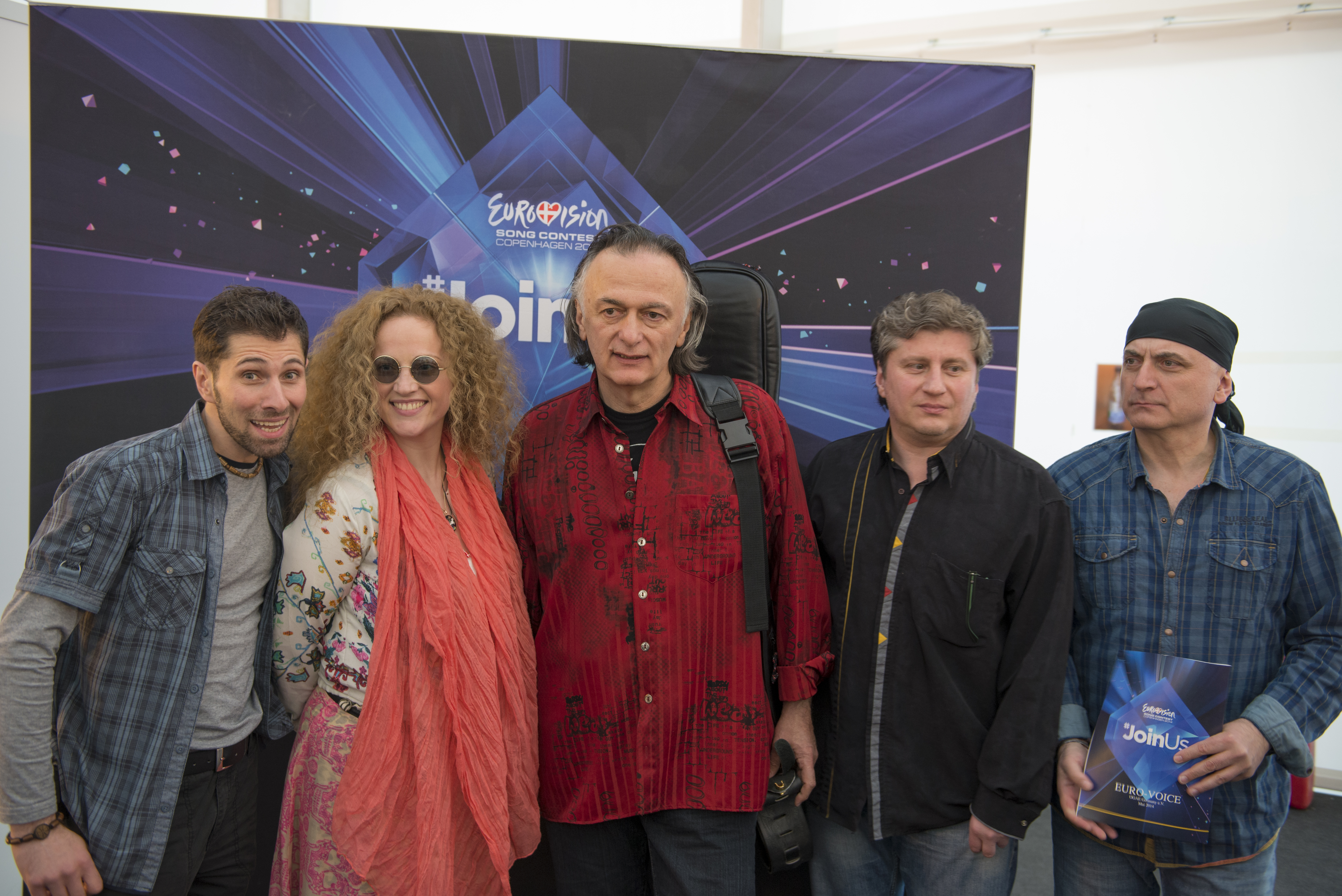
The Shin and Mariko during a press meet and greet

According to Eurovision rules, all nations with the exceptions of the host country and the "Big Five" (France, Germany, Italy, Spain and the United Kingdom) are required to qualify from one of two semi-finals in order to compete for the final; the top ten countries from each semi-final progress to the final. The European Broadcasting Union (EBU) split up the competing countries into six different pots based on voting patterns from previous contests, with countries with favourable voting histories put into the same pot. On 20 January 2014, a special allocation draw was held which placed each country into one of the two semi-finals, as well as which half of the show they would perform in. Georgia was placed into the second semi-final, to be held on 8 May 2014, and was scheduled to perform in the first half of the show.

Once all the competing songs for the 2014 contest had been released, the running order for the semi-finals was decided by the shows' producers rather than through another draw, so that similar songs were not placed next to each other. Georgia was set to perform in position 4, following the entry from Norway and before the entry from Poland.

Both the semi-finals and the final were broadcast in Georgia on the GPB First Channel with commentary by Lado Tatishvili and Tamuna Museridze. The Georgian spokesperson, who announced the Georgian votes during the final, were 2013 Georgian contest entrants Sophie Gelovani and Nodi Tatishvili.

=== Semi-final ===
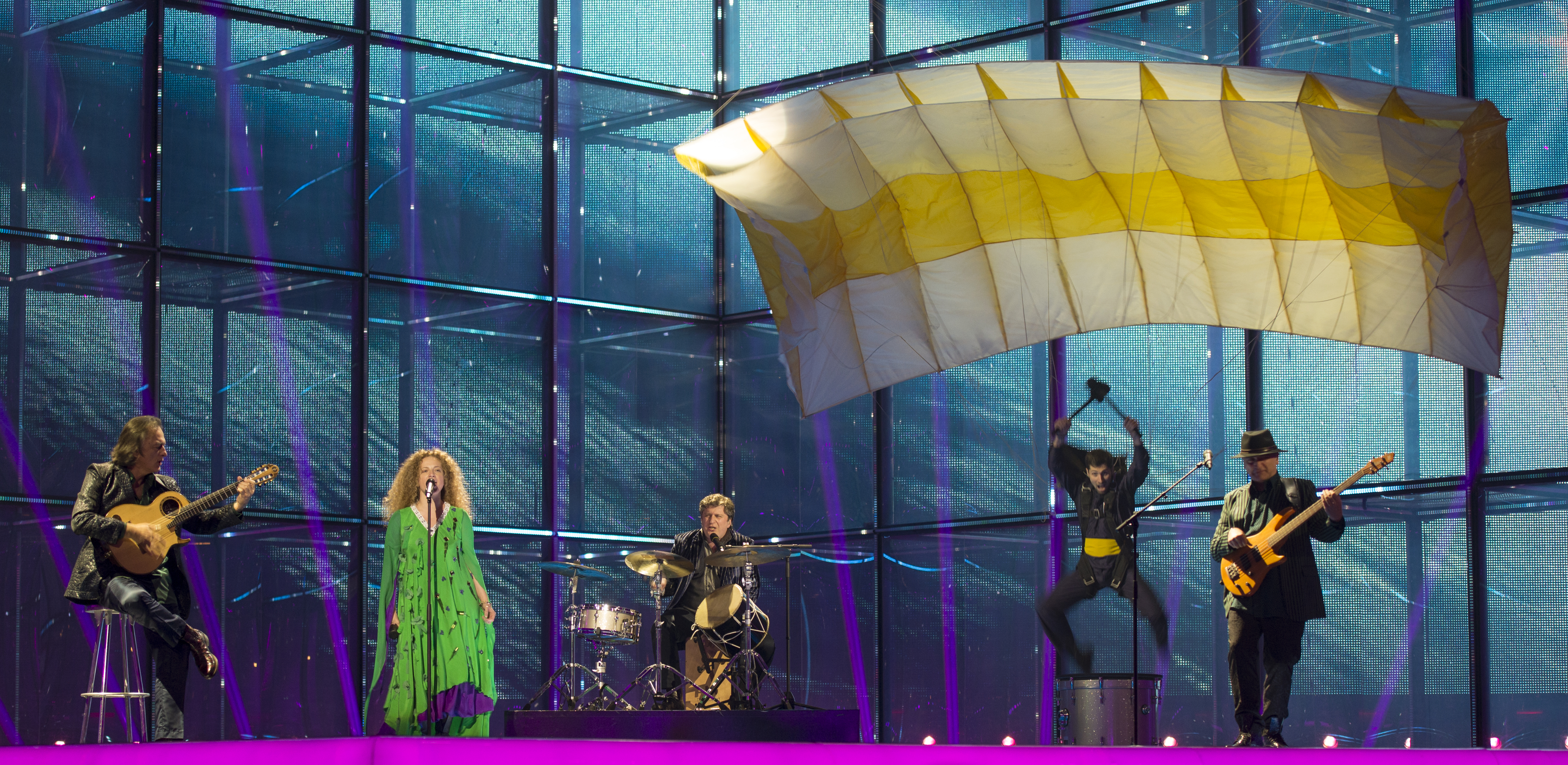
The Shin and Mariko at the second semi-final dress rehearsal

The Shin and Mariko took part in technical rehearsals on 29 April and 3 May, followed by dress rehearsals on 7 and 8 May. This included the jury final on 7 May where the professional juries of each country watched and voted on the competing entries.

The Georgian performance featured the members of The Shin dressed in dark suits and Mariko wearing a long green dress with gemstones attached and performing in a band set-up, which included one of the members of The Shin, Alexander Chumburidze, wearing a parachute. In regards to the parachute, band member Zaza Miminoshvili stated: "It's a symbol for the story we are telling in our song, which is about coming home - as the band name The Shin ('Home') suggests. When you go skydiving, you first have to overcome the fear, then you jump, and when the parachute opens, this is a symbol that the fear goes away. You are coming home, back to the Earth." The LED screens and stage floor projected blue skies which transitioned to a meadow and mountainous landscape. The performance also featured smoke effects.

At the end of the show, Georgia was not announced among the top 10 entries in the second semi-final and therefore failed to qualify to compete in the final. It was later revealed that Georgia placed fifteenth (last) in the semi-final, receiving a total of 15 points.

=== Voting ===
Voting during the three shows consisted of 50 percent public televoting and 50 percent from a jury deliberation. The jury consisted of five music industry professionals who were citizens of the country they represent, with their names published before the contest to ensure transparency. This jury was asked to judge each contestant based on: vocal capacity; the stage performance; the song's composition and originality; and the overall impression by the act. In addition, no member of a national jury could be related in any way to any of the competing acts in such a way that they cannot vote impartially and independently. The individual rankings of each jury member were released shortly after the grand final. In the semi-final, Georgia's vote was based on 100 percent jury voting due to either technical issues with the televoting or an insufficient number of valid votes cast during the televote period. In the final, Georgia's vote was based on 100 percent televoting due to a breach of the rules, of which the EBU believed that Georgia's jury members did not vote independently, as each juror had the same top 8 acts.

Following the release of the full split voting by the EBU after the conclusion of the competition, it was revealed that Georgia had placed fifteenth (last) with the public televote and thirteenth with the jury vote in the second semi-final. In the public vote, Georgia scored 15 points, while with the jury vote, Georgia scored 33 points.

Below is a breakdown of points awarded to Georgia and awarded by Georgia in the second semi-final and grand final of the contest, and the breakdown of the jury voting and televoting conducted during the two shows:

==== Points awarded to Georgia ====
Points awarded to Georgia (Semi-final 2)
Score	Country
12 points	
10 points	
8 points	
7 points	
6 points	Lithuania
5 points	Belarus
4 points	
3 points	
2 points	Malta
1 point	Germany; Greece

==== Points awarded by Georgia ====
Points awarded by Georgia (Semi-final 2)
Score	Country
12 points	Belarus
10 points	Austria
8 points	Malta
7 points	Lithuania
6 points	Romania
5 points	Norway
4 points	Slovenia
3 points	Greece
2 points	Macedonia
1 point	Finland

Points awarded by Georgia (Final)
Score	Country
12 points	Armenia
10 points	Austria
8 points	Russia
7 points	Azerbaijan
6 points	Ukraine
5 points	Germany
4 points	Greece
3 points	United Kingdom
2 points	Sweden
1 point	Switzerland

==== Detailed voting results ====
The following members comprised the Georgian jury:

- Giorgi Kukhianidze (jury chairperson) – musical producer
- Micheil Chelidze – musician, singer, represented Georgia in the 2011 contest as part of Eldrine
- Natia Khoshtaria – journalist, script writer
- Nino Chachava – musician
- Nana Daushvili – composer, pianist

Detailed voting results from Georgia (Semi-final 2)
R/O	Country	G. Kukhianidze	M. Chelidze	N. Khoshtaria	N. Chachava	N. Daushvili	Jury Rank	Points
01	Malta	14	3	3	3	3	3	8
02	Israel	12	9	14	10	10	14	
03	Norway	10	12	1	11	4	6	5
04	Georgia							
05	Poland	9	6	12	12	9	11	
06	Austria	1	7	4	6	1	2	10
07	Lithuania	8	5	5	5	5	4	7
08	Finland	7	1	13	14	12	10	1
09	Ireland	13	8	8	13	7	13	
10	Belarus	4	2	2	2	2	1	12
11	Macedonia	6	14	9	1	11	9	2
12	Switzerland	11	13	10	7	8	12	
13	Greece	5	11	7	4	13	8	3
14	Slovenia	3	10	11	9	6	7	4
15	Romania	2	4	6	8	14	5	6

Detailed results of Georgia's suspended jury vote (Final)
R/O	Country	G. Kukhianidze	M. Chelidze	N. Khoshtaria	N. Chachava	N. Daushvili
01	Ukraine	1	1	1	1	1
02	Belarus	4	4	4	4	4
03	Azerbaijan	2	2	2	2	2
04	Iceland	19	20	24	24	20
05	Norway	16	15	25	23	12
06	Romania	9	11	9	14	10
07	Armenia	3	3	3	3	3
08	Montenegro	5	5	5	5	5
09	Poland	13	12	11	11	21
10	Greece	15	13	20	16	23
11	Austria	8	8	8	8	8
12	Germany	18	14	21	12	16
13	Sweden	11	9	14	15	9
14	France	26	16	22	25	19
15	Russia	20	17	17	17	22
16	Italy	7	7	7	7	7
17	Slovenia	17	18	23	18	26
18	Finland	10	19	10	9	24
19	Spain	12	10	13	20	11
20	Switzerland	21	25	12	26	25
21	Hungary	25	26	19	19	14
22	Malta	14	22	16	22	13
23	Denmark	22	21	26	13	15
24	Netherlands	24	23	15	10	17
25	San Marino	23	24	18	21	18
26	United Kingdom	6	6	6	6	6

Detailed voting results from Georgia (Final)
R/O	Country	Televote Rank	Points
01	Ukraine	5	6
02	Belarus	11	
03	Azerbaijan	4	7
04	Iceland	19	
05	Norway	20	
06	Romania	15	
07	Armenia	1	12
08	Montenegro	25	
09	Poland	12	
10	Greece	7	4
11	Austria	2	10
12	Germany	6	5
13	Sweden	9	2
14	France	17	
15	Russia	3	8
16	Italy	18	
17	Slovenia	26	
18	Finland	21	
19	Spain	16	
20	Switzerland	10	1
21	Hungary	23	
22	Malta	22	
23	Denmark	24	
24	Netherlands	13	
25	San Marino	14	
26	United Kingdom	8	3
