= Mariko Ebralidze =

Georgian jazz singer

Mariko Ebralidze მარიკო ებრალიძე
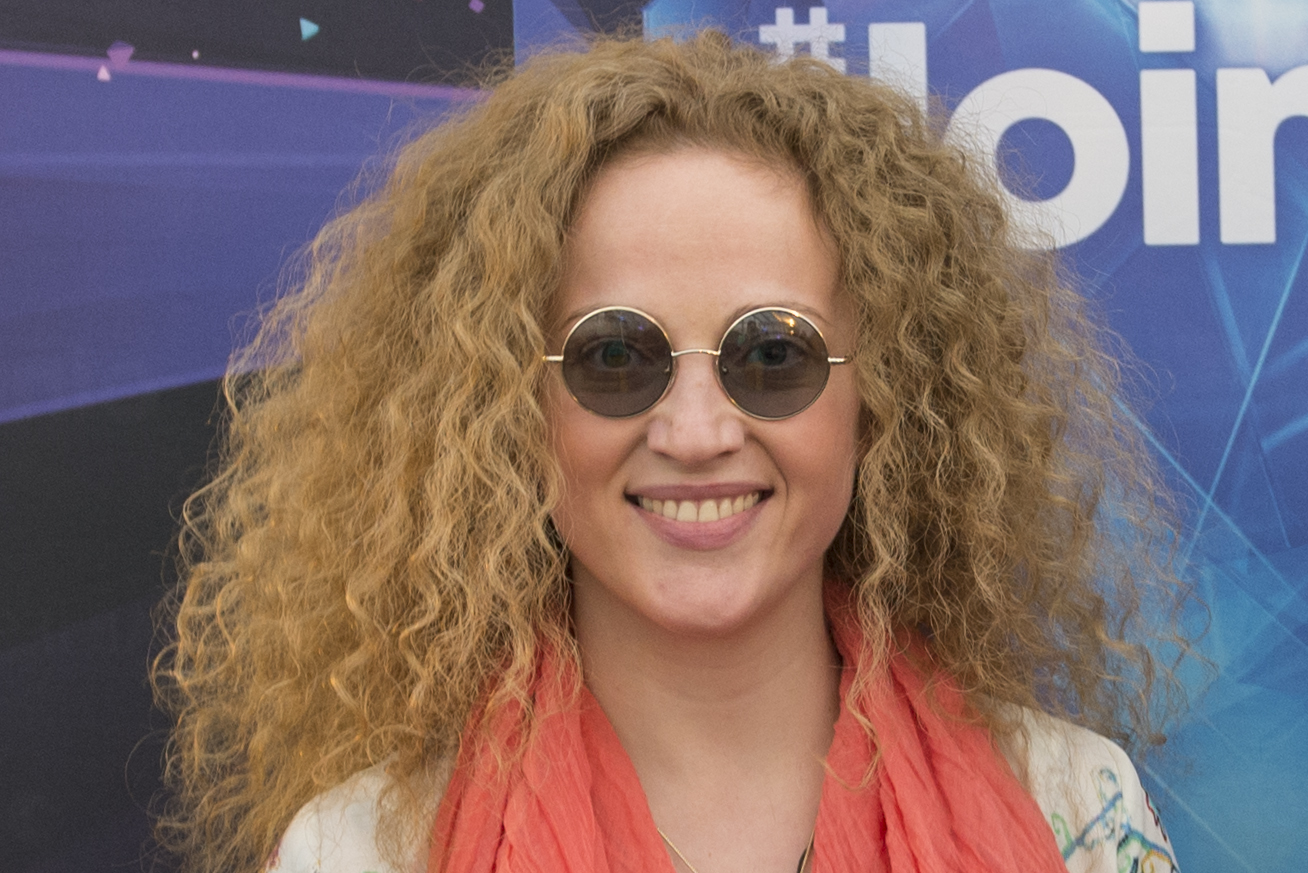
- Mariko Ebralidze (2014)

Background information
- Born: Mariko Ebralidze; 1984 (age 41–42); Tbilisi, Georgian SSR, Soviet Union
- Genres: Jazz, R&B, soul, pop
- Occupation: Singer
- Instrument: Vocals

Mariko Ebralidze (Georgian: მარიკო ებრალიძე; born 1984) is a Georgian jazz singer who represented her country in the Eurovision Song Contest 2014 along with the group The Shin with the song "Three Minutes to Earth".

Born in Tbilisi, Ebralidze studied at the Zakaria Paliashvili music college and the Pedagogical Institute of Music Arts, and received a bachelor's degree as a soloist and teacher in 2008. She had gained popularity in Georgia as a jazz singer. Since 2008, Ebralidze has been a soloist at the Tbilisi Municipality orchestra Big Band.

Awards and achievements
| Preceded by Nodi Tatishvili & Sophie Gelovani with "Waterfall" | Georgia in the Eurovision Song Contest with The Shin; 2014 | Succeeded by Nina Sublatti with "Warrior" |
