= Georgia in the Eurovision Song Contest 2013 =

- Eurovision Song Contest 2013
- Participating broadcaster: Georgian Public Broadcaster (GPB)
- Country: Georgia
- Selection process: Internal selection
- Announcement date: Artist: 31 December 2012; Song: 27 February 2013

Competing entry
- Song: "Waterfall"
- Artist: Nodi Tatishvili and Sophie Gelovani
- Songwriters: Thomas G:son; Erik Bernholm

Placement
- Semi-final result: Qualified (10th, 63 points)
- Final result: 15th, 50 points

Participation chronology

Georgia was represented at the Eurovision Song Contest 2013 with the song "Waterfall", written by Thomas G:son and Erik Bernholm, and performed by Nodi Tatishvili and Sophie Gelovani. The Georgian participating broadcaster, Georgian Public Broadcaster (GPB), internally selected its entry for the contest in December 2012. "Waterfall" was presented to the public on 27 February 2013.

Georgia was drawn to compete in the second semi-final of the Eurovision Song Contest which took place on 16 May 2013. Performing during the show in position 15, "Waterfall" was announced among the top 10 entries of the second semi-final and therefore qualified to compete in the final on 18 May. It was later revealed that Georgia placed tenth out of the 17 participating countries in the semi-final with 63 points. In the final, Georgia performed in position 25 and placed fifteenth out of the 26 participating countries, scoring 50 points.

== Background ==
Prior to the 2013 contest, Georgia had participated in the Eurovision Song Contest five times since their first entry in 2007. The nation's highest placing in the contest, to this point, has been ninth place, which was achieved on two occasions: in 2010 with the song "Shine" performed by Sofia Nizharadze and in 2011 with the song "One More Day" performed by Eldrine. The nation briefly withdrew from the contest in 2009 after the European Broadcasting Union (EBU) rejected the Georgian entry, "We Don't Wanna Put In", for perceived political references to Vladimir Putin who was the Russian Prime Minister at the time. The withdrawal and fallout was tied to tense relations between Georgia and then host country Russia, which stemmed from the 2008 Russo-Georgian War. Following the introduction of semi-finals, Georgia has, to this point, failed to qualify to the final on only one occasion: in 2012 with the song "I'm a Joker" performed by Anri Jokhadze.

The Georgian national broadcaster, Georgian Public Broadcaster (GPB), broadcasts the event within Georgia and organises the selection process for the nation's entry. GPB confirmed their intentions to participate at the 2013 Eurovision Song Contest on 18 September 2012. Georgia has traditionally selected their entry for the Eurovision Song Contest via a national final. However, for their 2013 participation, GPB opted to internally select the Georgian entry.

== Before Eurovision ==
=== Internal selection ===
On 31 December 2012, the broadcaster announced that they had internally selected Nodi Tatishvili and Sophie Gelovani to represent Georgia in Malmö. On 10 January 2013, GPB announced that Swedish composer Thomas G:son, who has written several Eurovision entries for various countries including the Swedish Eurovision Song Contest 2012 winning song "Euphoria", would create their song. The song "Waterfall", written and composed by G:son and Erik Bernholm, premiered on 27 February 2013 together with the music video on the GPB First Channel programme Our Morning. The music video was filmed at the House Museum of Alexander Chavchavadze in Tsinandali and was directed by Temo Kvirkvelia.

=== Promotion ===
Prior to the contest, Nodi Tatishvili and Sophie Gelovani specifically promoted "Waterfall" as the Georgian Eurovision entry on 2 March 2013 by performing during the Armenian Eurovision national final.

== At Eurovision ==
According to Eurovision rules, all nations with the exceptions of the host country and the "Big Five" (France, Germany, Italy, Spain and the United Kingdom) are required to qualify from one of two semi-finals in order to compete for the final; the top ten countries from each semi-final progress to the final. The European Broadcasting Union (EBU) split up the competing countries into six different pots based on voting patterns from previous contests, with countries with favourable voting histories put into the same pot. On 17 January 2013, a special allocation draw was held which placed each country into one of the two semi-finals, as well as which half of the show they would perform in. Georgia was placed into the second semi-final, to be held on 16 May 2013, and was scheduled to perform in the second half of the show.

Once all the competing songs for the 2013 contest had been released, the running order for the semi-finals was decided by the shows' producers rather than through another draw, so that similar songs were not placed next to each other. Georgia was set to perform in position 15, following the entry from Albania and before the entry from Switzerland.

Both the semi-finals and the final were broadcast in Georgia on the GPB First Channel with commentary by Temo Kvirkvelia. The Georgian spokesperson, who announced the Georgian votes during the final, was Liza Tsiklauri.

=== Semi-final ===
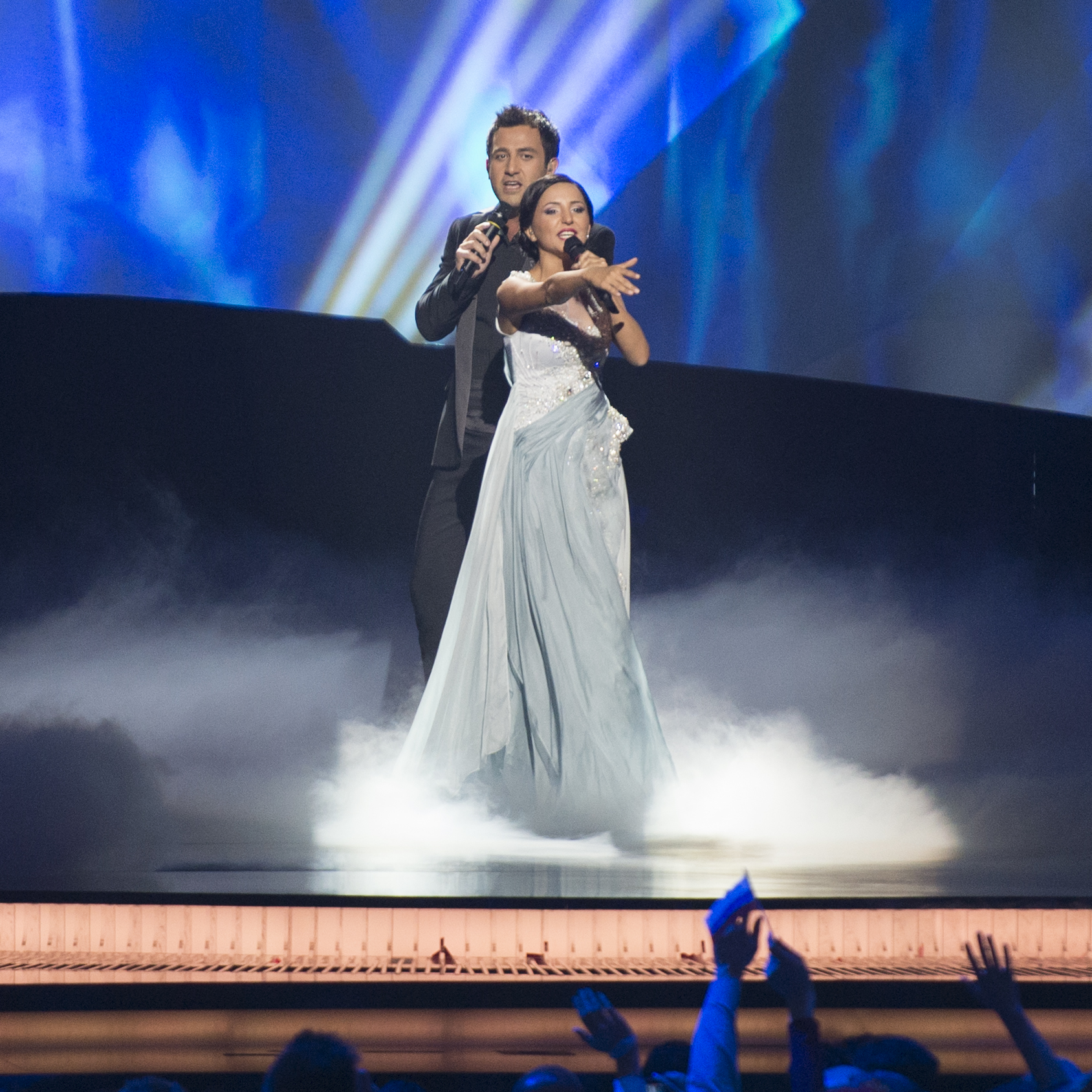
Nodi Tatishvili and Sophie Gelovani during a rehearsal before the second semi-final

Nodi Tatishvili and Sophie Gelovani took part in technical rehearsals on 5 and 7 May, followed by dress rehearsals on 11 and 12 May. This included the jury show on 11 May where the professional juries of each country watched and voted on the competing entries.

The Georgian performance featured Tatishvili and Gelovani dressed in outfits designed by Georgian designer Avtandil Tskvitinidze, facing each other and holding hands on stage. The stage colours were dark with spotlights on Tatishvili and Gelovani as well as three backing vocalists. The performance also featured smoke effects and a pyrotechnic waterfall. The staging director for the Georgian performance was Lasha Oniani. The three backing vocalists that joined Tatishvili and Gelovani were: Johanna Beijbom, Lisette Vares Uhlmann and Hans-Martin Kagemark.

At the end of the show, Georgia was announced as having finished in the top 10 and subsequently qualifying for the grand final. It was later revealed that Georgia placed tenth in the semi-final, receiving a total of 63 points.

=== Final ===
Shortly after the second semi-final, a winners' press conference was held for the ten qualifying countries. As part of this press conference, the qualifying artists took part in a draw to determine which half of the grand final they would subsequently participate in. This draw was done in the order the countries appeared in the semi-final running order. Georgia was drawn to compete in the second half. Following this draw, the shows' producers decided upon the running order of the final, as they had done for the semi-finals. Georgia was subsequently placed to perform in position 25, following the entry from Norway and before the entry from Ireland.

Nodi Tatishvili and Sophie Gelovani once again took part in dress rehearsals on 17 and 18 May before the final, including the jury final where the professional juries cast their final votes before the live show. The duet performed a repeat of their semi-final performance during the final on 18 May. At the conclusion of the voting, Georgia finished in fifteenth place with 50 points.

==== Marcel Bezençon Awards ====
The Marcel Bezençon Awards, first awarded during the 2002 contest, are awards honouring the best competing songs in the final each year. Named after the creator of the annual contest, Marcel Bezençon, the awards are divided into 3 categories: the Press Award, given to the best entry as voted on by the accredited media and press during the event; the Artistic Award, presented to the best artist as voted on by the shows' commentators; and the Composer Award, given to the best and most original composition as voted by the participating composers. Nodi Tatishvili and Sophie Gelovani were awarded the Press Award, which was accepted at the awards ceremony by the duet.

=== Voting ===
Voting during the three shows consisted of 50 percent public televoting and 50 percent from a jury deliberation. The jury consisted of five music industry professionals who were citizens of the country they represent. This jury was asked to judge each contestant based on: vocal capacity; the stage performance; the song's composition and originality; and the overall impression by the act. In addition, no member of a national jury could be related in any way to any of the competing acts in such a way that they cannot vote impartially and independently.

Following the release of the full split voting by the EBU after the conclusion of the competition, it was revealed that Georgia had placed twenty-third with the public televote and fifteenth with the jury vote in the final. In the public vote, Georgia received an average rank of 17.08, while with the jury vote, Georgia received an average rank of 12.10. In the second semi-final, Georgia placed thirteenth with the public televote with an average rank of 9.89 and fifth with the jury vote with an average rank of 6.05.

Below is a breakdown of points awarded to Georgia and awarded by Georgia in the second semi-final and grand final of the contest. The nation awarded its 12 points to Azerbaijan in the semi-final and the final of the contest.

==== Points awarded to Georgia ====
Points awarded to Georgia (Semi-final 2)
Score	Country
12 points	Armenia
10 points	Azerbaijan
8 points	
7 points	Israel
6 points	Greece
5 points	
4 points	Hungary; Iceland; Latvia; Macedonia; Malta; Spain
3 points	Bulgaria
2 points	
1 point	San Marino

Points awarded to Georgia (Final)
Score	Country
12 points	
10 points	Armenia; Azerbaijan
8 points	Lithuania
7 points	Ukraine
6 points	
5 points	Greece; Russia
4 points	
3 points	Moldova
2 points	Montenegro
1 point	

==== Points awarded by Georgia ====
Points awarded by Georgia (Semi-final 2)
Score	Country
12 points	Azerbaijan
10 points	Armenia
8 points	Norway
7 points	Latvia
6 points	Malta
5 points	Israel
4 points	Bulgaria
3 points	Hungary
2 points	Greece
1 point	San Marino

Points awarded by Georgia (Final)
Score	Country
12 points	Azerbaijan
10 points	Armenia
8 points	Ukraine
7 points	Denmark
6 points	Russia
5 points	Belarus
4 points	Norway
3 points	Malta
2 points	Italy
1 point	Lithuania
