= Belarus in the Eurovision Song Contest 2020 =

- Eurovision Song Contest 2020
- Participating broadcaster: Belarusian Television and Radio Company (BTRC)
- Country: Belarus
- Selection process: Natsionalny Otbor
- Selection date: 28 February 2020

Competing entry
- Song: "Da vidna"
- Artist: VAL
- Songwriters: Uladzislaŭ Paškievič; Valeryja Hrybusava; Mikita Najdzionaŭ

Placement
- Final result: Contest cancelled

Participation chronology

Belarus was set to be represented at the Eurovision Song Contest 2020 with the song "Da vidna" written by Uladzislaŭ Paškievič, Valeryja Hrybusava and Mikita Najdzionaŭ. The song was performed by the band VAL. The Belarusian entry for the 2020 contest in Rotterdam, Netherlands was selected through the national final Natsionalny Otbor, which was organised by the Belarusian participating broadcaster Belarusian Television and Radio Company (BTRC). The national final consisted of twelve competing acts participating in a televised production where "Da vidna" performed by VAL was selected as the winner following the combination of votes from a jury panel and public televoting.

Belarus was drawn to compete in the first semi-final of the Eurovision Song Contest which was scheduled to take place on 12 May 2020. However, the contest was cancelled due to the COVID-19 pandemic.

== Background ==
Prior to the 2020 Contest, Belarus had participated in the Eurovision Song Contest sixteen times since its first entry in 2004. The nation's best placing in the contest was sixth, which it achieved in 2007 with the song "Work Your Magic" performed by Dmitry Koldun. Following the introduction of semi-finals for the 2004 contest, Belarus had managed to qualify for the final six times. In 2019, Belarus qualified for the final and placed twenty-fourth with the song "Like It" performed by Zena.

The Belarusian national broadcaster, Belarusian Television and Radio Company (BTRC), broadcasts the event within Belarus and organises the selection process for the nation's entry. The broadcaster has used both internal selections and national finals to select the Belarusian entry for Eurovision in the past. Since 2012, BTRC has organised a national final in order to choose Belarus' entry, a selection procedure that continued for their 2020 entry.

== Before Eurovision ==
=== Natsionalny Otbor ===
The Belarusian national final, Natsionalny Otbor, took place on 28 February 2020. Twelve songs participated in the competition and the winner was selected through a jury and public televote. The show was broadcast on Belarus 1, Belarus 24 and Radius FM as well as online via the broadcaster's official website tvr.by.

==== Competing entries ====
Artists and composers were able to submit their applications and entries to the broadcaster between 9 January 2020 and 17 January 2020. At the closing of the deadline, 95 entries were received by the broadcaster, of which 65 were valid. A jury panel selected 49 entries for auditions that were held on 27 January 2020 at the BTRC "600 Metrov" studio, where an alternate jury panel was tasked with selecting up to twelve entries to proceed to the televised national final. The auditions were webcast online at the official BTRC website. The jury for the auditions consisted of Tatyana Yakusheva (head of music of the radio station "Radio Belarus"), Georgiy Koldun (singer and television host), Zena (singer, represented Belarus at Eurovision in 2019), Elena Atrashkevich (head of the Belarusian Union of Composers), Naviband (band which represented Belarus at Eurovision in 2017), Yuriy Seleznyov (singer and composer), Yana Stankevich (producer) and Vladislava Artyukovskaya (artistic director of the Youth Variety Theater). Twelve finalists were selected and announced on 27 January 2020.

Artist	Song	Songwriter(s)
Anastasiya Malashkevich	"Invisible"	Niklas Bergqvist, Ylva Persson, Linda Persson, Simon Johansson
Angelika Pushnova	"True Love"	Oleg Sidorov, Anastasiya Belyavskaya, Nikos Sofis
Aura	"Barani svajo" (Барані сваё)	Evgeniy Oleynik
Chakras	"La-ley-la"	Max Aleinikov
Darya Khmelnitskaya	"On Fire"	Aleksandra Tkach
KeySi	"Chili Pepper"	D. Bain, Dmitry Fomich, M. Duke
Napoli	"Don't Let Me Down"	Michael James Down, Will Taylor, Rafaela Truda
Nastasea	"Hello"	Anastasiya Razvadovskaya, Sasha Guris, Vitaly Penzin
Nastya Glamozda	"Burning Again"	Anastasiya Hlamozda, Dmitry Piven
Sasha Zakharik	"Rocky Road"	Alexandra Zakharik
VAL	"Da vidna" (Да відна)	Uladzislaŭ Paškievič, Valeryja Hrybusava, Mikita Najdzionaŭ
Yan Yarosh	"Fire"	Yan Yarosh, Matthew Douglas Funnell

==== Final ====
The televised final took place on 28 February 2020 at the "Belarusfilm" studio in Minsk, hosted by Evgeny Perlin and 2017 Belarusian Junior Eurovision contestant Helena Meraai. Prior to the competition, a draw for the running order took place on 28 January 2020. A 50/50 combination of votes from nine jury members made up of music professionals and a public telephone vote selected the song "Da vidna" performed by VAL as the winner. The jury consisted of Stig Karlsen (executive producer of the Norwegian TV channel NRK), Dmitry Koldun (singer, represented Belarus at Eurovision in 2007), William Lee Adams (founder and editor Eurovision blog Wiwibloggs), Olga Vorobyova (singer and composer, artistic director of the ensemble Camerata), Zena (singer, represented Belarus at Eurovision in 2019), Alexandros Panayi (Cypriot singer-songwriter, represented Cyprus at Eurovision in 1995 and 2000), Tali Eshkoli (producer of the Israeli TV channel Kan), Yuriy Seleznyov (singer and composer) and Joana Levieva-Sawyer (producer and journalist, Bulgarian head of delegation for Eurovision).

Final – 28 February 2020
R/O	Artist	Song	Jury		Televote		Total	Place
R/O	Artist	Song	Votes	Points	Votes	Points	Total	Place
1	Napoli	"Don't Let Me Down"	29	2	373	3	5	9
2	Sasha Zakharik	"Rocky Road"	43	4	371	2	6	8
3	Anastasiya Malashkevich	"Invisible"	64	8	499	4	12	5
4	Chakras	"La-ley-la"	59	6	2,190	12	18	3
5	Nastya Glamozda	"Burning Again"	18	1	305	1	2	10
6	Nastasea	"Hello"	9	0	258	0	0	12
7	Yan Yarosh	"Fire"	80	12	706	6	18	2
8	Angelika Pushnova	"True Love"	47	5	634	5	10	6
9	Darya Khmelnitskaya	"On Fire"	13	0	261	0	0	11
10	Aura	"Barani svajo"	30	3	812	7	10	7
11	KeySi	"Chili Pepper"	61	7	1,010	8	15	4
12	VAL	"Da vidna"	69	10	1,494	10	20	1

Detailed Jury Votes
R/O	Song	S. Karlsen	D. Koldun	W.L. Adams	O. Vorobyova	Zena	A. Panayi	T. Eshkoli	Y. Seleznyov	J. Levieva-Sawyer	Total
1	"Don't Let Me Down"	6	2	4	3	6	2		4	2	29
2	"Rocky Road"		3	2	5	3	6	6	8	10	43
3	"Invisible"	10	8	10	10	8	4	5	6	3	64
4	"La-ley-la"	7	4	5		7	12	12	5	7	59
5	"Burning Again"	2			6				10		18
6	"Hello"	1			2	4		2			9
7	"Fire"	8	12	12	12	1	10	10	7	8	80
8	"True Love"	5	7	6	1	5	7	8	3	5	47
9	"On Fire"	4	1	1			3	3		1	13
10	"Barani svajo"		5	3	7	2	1	7	1	4	30
11	"Chili Pepper"	12	10	8	4	10	5	4	2	6	61
12	"Da vidna"	3	6	7	8	12	8	1	12	12	69

== At Eurovision ==
According to Eurovision rules, all nations with the exceptions of the host country and the "Big Five" (France, Germany, Italy, Spain and the United Kingdom) are required to qualify from one of two semi-finals in order to compete for the final; the top ten countries from each semi-final progress to the final. The European Broadcasting Union (EBU) split up the competing countries into six different pots based on voting patterns from previous contests, with countries with favourable voting histories put into the same pot. On 28 January 2020, a special allocation draw was held which placed each country into one of the two semi-finals, as well as which half of the show they would perform in. Belarus was placed into the first semi-final, to be held on 12 May 2020, and was scheduled to perform in the first half of the show. However, due to the COVID-19 pandemic, the contest was cancelled.

Prior to the Eurovision Song Celebration YouTube broadcast in place of the semi-finals, it was revealed that Belarus was set to perform in position 2, before the entry from Australia and after the entry from Sweden.
