= Belarus in the Eurovision Song Contest 2019 =

- Eurovision Song Contest 2019
- Participating broadcaster: Belarusian Television and Radio Company (BTRC)
- Country: Belarus
- Selection process: Natsionalny Otbor
- Selection date: 7 March 2019

Competing entry
- Song: "Like It"
- Artist: Zena
- Songwriters: Yulia Kireeva; Viktor Drobysh; Zinaida Kupriyanovich

Placement
- Semi-final result: Qualified (10th, 122 points)
- Final result: 24th, 31 points

Participation chronology

Belarus was represented at the Eurovision Song Contest 2019 with the song "Like It", written by Zinaida Kupriyanovich, Yulia Kireeva and Viktor Drobysh, and performed by Kupriyanovich herself under the stage name Zena. The Belarusian entry for the 2019 contest in Tel Aviv, Israel was selected through the national final Natsionalny Otbor, which was organised by the Belarusian participating broadcaster Belarusian Television and Radio Company (BTRC). The national final consisted of ten competing acts participating in a televised production where a jury panel selected "Like It" performed by Zena as the winner.

Belarus was drawn to compete in the first semi-final of the Eurovision Song Contest which took place on 14 May 2019. Performing during the show in position 8, "Like It" was announced among the top 10 entries of the first semi-final and therefore qualified to compete in the final on 13 May. It was later revealed that Belarus placed tenth out of the 17 participating countries in the semi-final with 122 points. In the final, Belarus performed in position 19 and placed twenty-fourth out of the 26 participating countries, scoring 31 points.

As of 2026, this was Belarus' final entry in the contest, with BTRC's planned entry in 2020 not being able to compete due to the event's cancellation as a result of the COVID-19 pandemic, BTRC's intended entry in 2021 being disqualified, and the broadcaster's membership in the European Broadcasting Union (EBU) being indefinitely suspended later that year.

== Background ==
Prior to the 2019 contest, Belarus had participated in the Eurovision Song Contest fifteen times since its first entry in 2004. The nation's best placing in the contest was sixth, which it achieved in 2007 with the song "Work Your Magic" performed by Koldun. Following the introduction of semi-finals for the 2004 contest, Belarus had managed to qualify to the final five times. In 2017, Belarus managed to qualify to the final with the song "Story of My Life" performed by Naviband. In 2018, Belarus failed to qualify to the final with the song "Forever" performed by Alekseev.

The Belarusian national broadcaster, Belarusian Television and Radio Company (BTRC), broadcasts the event within Belarus and organises the selection process for the nation's entry. The broadcaster has used both internal selections and national finals to select the Belarusian entry for Eurovision in the past. Since 2012, BTRC has organised a national final in order to choose Belarus' entry, a selection procedure that continued for their 2019 entry.

== Before Eurovision ==
=== Natsionalny Otbor ===
The Belarusian national final, titled Natsionalny Otbor, took place on 7 March 2019. Ten songs participated in the competition and the winner was selected exclusively via a jury. The show was broadcast on Belarus 1, Belarus 24 and Radius FM as well as online via the broadcaster's official website tvr.by.

==== Competing entries ====
Artists and composers were able to submit their applications and entries to the broadcaster between 23 January 2019 and 31 January 2019. At the closing of the deadline, a record 113 entries were received by the broadcaster. Auditions were held on 4 February 2019 at the BTRC "600 Metrov" studio where a jury panel was tasked with selecting up to fifteen entries from the 73 attendees to proceed to the televised national final. The auditions were webcast online at the official BTRC website. The jury consisted of Alyona Lanskaya (singer, represented Belarus at Eurovision in 2013), Teo (singer, represented Belarus at Eurovision in 2014), German (singer), Angelina Mikulskaya (producer), Evgeny Perlin (television host), Andrey Kalina (producer), Elena Atrashkevich (head of the Belarusian Union of Composers), Olga Vronskaya (singer), Igor Melnikov (vocal coach), Valery Prigun (singer) and Vasily Golovan (deputy head of the department of special cultural events at the Belarusian Ministry of Culture). Ten finalists were selected and announced on 4 February 2019.

==== Final ====
The televised final took place on 7 March 2019 at the "600 Metrov" studio in Minsk, hosted by Olga Ryzhikova and 2014 Belarusian Eurovision contestant Teo. Prior to the competition, a draw for the running order took place on 5 February 2019. The votes of seven jury members made up of music professionals exclusively selected the song "Like It" performed by Zena as the winner. Each jury member assigned scores to each song ranging from 1 (lowest score) to 10 (highest score) immediately after the artists conclude their performance. The jury consisted of Elena Atrashkevich (head of the Belarusian Union of Composers), Tatyana Drobysheva (singer, vocal teacher at the Belarusian State University of Culture and Arts), Valeriy Prigun (singer), Dmitry Koldun (singer, represented Belarus at Eurovision in 2007), Aleks David (singer-songwriter), Gleb Davidov (television and radio host) and Yana Stankevich (producer).

Final – 7 March 2019
R/O	Artist	Song	Songwriter(s)	Points	Place
1	Michael Soul	"Humanize"	Michael Soul, Yuliya Kolovertnykh, Andrey Katikov, Vladislav Pashkevich	59	4
2	Zena	"Like It"	Yulia Kireeva, Viktor Drobysh, Zinaida Kupriyanovich	69	1
3	Eva Kogan	"Run"	Leonid Shirin, Natalia Tambovtseva	54	10
4	BLGN and Mirex	"Champion"	Sasha Balagan, Mirex Silva	65	2
5	Sebastian Roos	"Never Getting Close"	Alberto Estebanez, Lars Carlsson, Björn Ledelius, Sebastian Roos	62	3
6	Alyona Gorbachova	"Can We Dream"	Leonid Shirin, Aleksey Shirin	59	4
7	Provokatsiya	"Running Away from the Sun"	Kirill Good, Denis Yasuchenya	55	8
8	Aura	"Charavala" (Чаравала)	Evgeniy Oleynik	55	8
9	Napoli	"Let It Go"	Aleksandra Tkach	58	7
10	KeySi	"No Love Lost"	Dmitriy Fomich, Kseniya Fomich	59	4

Detailed jury votes
R/O	Song	E. Atrashkevich	T. Drobysheva	V. Prigun	D. Koldun	A. David	G. Davidov	Y. Stankevich	Total
1	"Humanize"	9	8	7	8	9	9	9	59
2	"Like It"	9	10	10	10	10	10	10	69
3	"Run"	8	7	9	8	7	7	8	54
4	"Champion"	7	9	10	10	10	9	10	65
5	"Never Getting Close"	10	10	9	10	8	7	8	62
6	"Can We Dream"	9	7	9	9	8	8	9	59
7	"Running Away from the Sun"	7	8	8	8	8	7	9	55
8	"Charavala"	8	8	8	7	8	8	8	55
9	"Let It Go"	9	9	8	9	7	7	9	58
10	"No Love Lost"	9	9	8	9	7	8	9	59

=== Promotion ===
Zena made several appearances across Europe to specifically promote "Like It" as the Belarusian Eurovision entry. On 6 April, Zena performed during the Eurovision in Concert event which was held at the AFAS Live venue in Amsterdam, Netherlands and hosted by Edsilia Rombley and Marlayne. On 14 April, Zena performed during the London Eurovision Party, which was held at the Café de Paris venue in London and hosted by Nicki French and Paddy O'Connell.

== At Eurovision ==
According to Eurovision rules, all nations with the exceptions of the host country and the "Big Five" (France, Germany, Italy, Spain and the United Kingdom) are required to qualify from one of two semi-finals in order to compete for the final; the top ten countries from each semi-final progress to the final. The European Broadcasting Union (EBU) split up the competing countries into six different pots based on voting patterns from previous contests, with countries with favourable voting histories put into the same pot. On 28 January 2019, a special allocation draw was held which placed each country into one of the two semi-finals, as well as which half of the show they would perform in. Belarus was placed into the first semi-final, to be held on 14 May 2019, and was scheduled to perform in the first half of the show.

Once all the competing songs for the 2019 contest had been released, the running order for the semi-finals was decided by the shows' producers rather than through another draw, so that similar songs were not placed next to each other. Belarus was set to perform in position 8, following the entry from Hungary and before the entry from Serbia.

The two semi-finals and the final were broadcast in Belarus on Belarus 1 and Belarus 24 with commentary by Evgeny Perlin. The Belarusian spokesperson, who announce the top 12-point score awarded by the Belarusian jury during the final, was 2015 Belarusian representative Uzari.

=== Semi-final ===
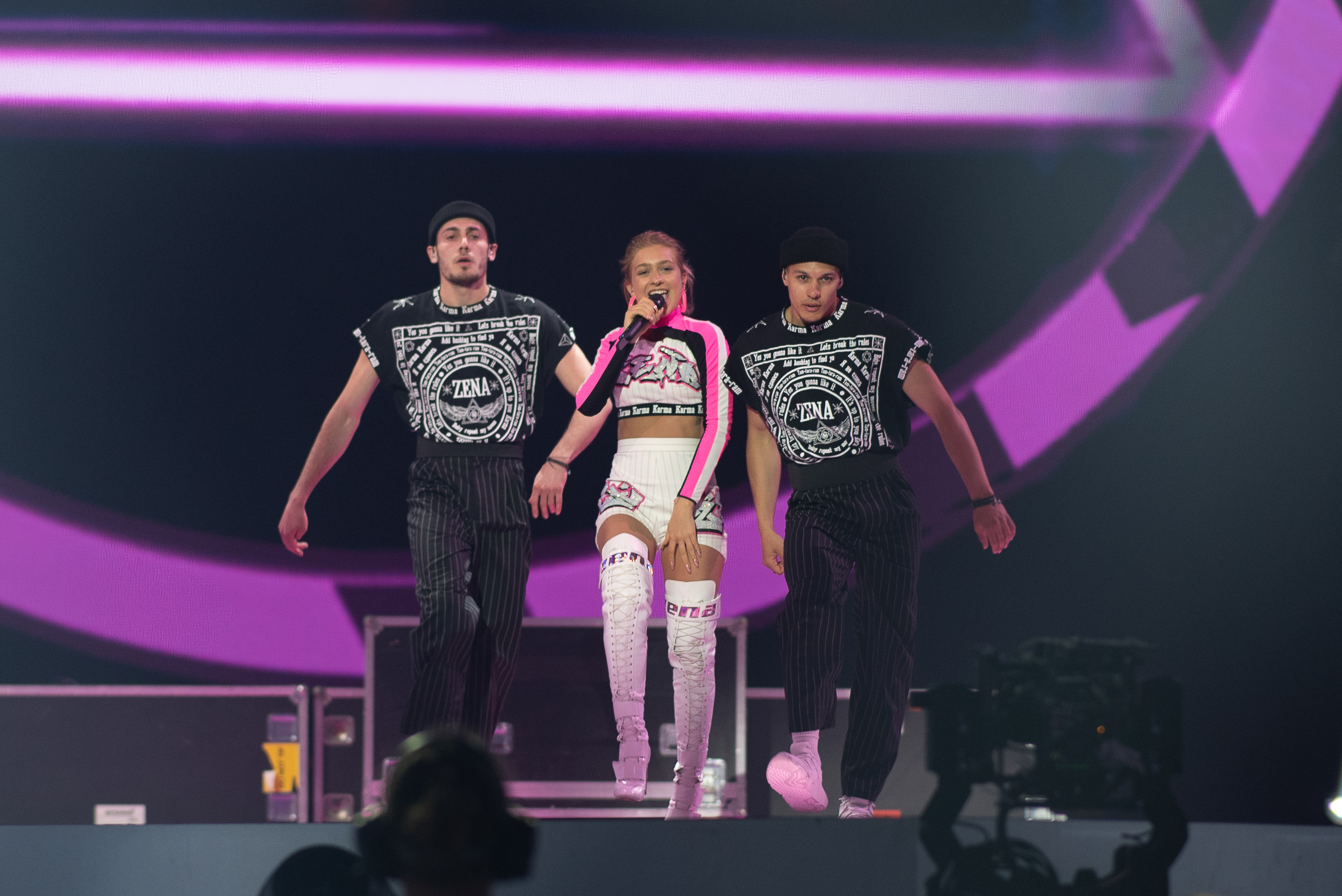
Zena during a rehearsal before the first semi-final

Zena took part in technical rehearsals on 4 and 9 May, followed by dress rehearsals on 13 and 14 May. This included the jury show on 13 May where the professional juries of each country watched and voted on the competing entries.

The Belarusian performance featured Zena wearing a crop top and pants in comic-inspired print as well as thigh-high white boots, performing on stage together with two male dancers and two female dancers, the latter which also performed backing vocals. The performance began with Zena sitting on a music equipment boxes, carried by the male dancers to centre stage. The LED screens displayed various coloured animations, while the stage featured several music equipment boxes as well as smoke and pyrotechnic flame effects. The four dancers that joined Zena were: Ali Gudiev, Mike Isaev, Radmira Mantuliny and Sofia Mantuliny. An additional off-stage backing vocalist was also featured: Olga Dorozhey.

At the end of the show, Belarus was announced as having finished in the top 10 and subsequently qualifying for the grand final. It was later revealed that Belarus placed tenth in the semi-final, receiving a total of 122 points: 44 points from the televoting and 78 points from the juries.

=== Final ===
Shortly after the first semi-final, a winners' press conference was held for the ten qualifying countries. As part of this press conference, the qualifying artists took part in a draw to determine which half of the grand final they would subsequently participate in. This draw was done in the order the countries were announced during the semi-final. Belarus was drawn to compete in the second half. Following this draw, the shows' producers decided upon the running order of the final, as they had done for the semi-finals. Belarus was subsequently placed to perform in position 19, following the entry from Estonia and before the entry from Azerbaijan.

Zena once again took part in dress rehearsals on 17 and 18 May before the final, including the jury final where the professional juries cast their final votes before the live show. Zena performed a repeat of her semi-final performance during the final on 18 May. Belarus placed twenty-fourth in the final, scoring 31 points: 13 points from the televoting and 18 points from the juries.

=== Voting ===
Voting during the three shows involved each country awarding two sets of points from 1–8, 10 and 12: one from their professional jury and the other from televoting. Each nation's jury consisted of five music industry professionals who are citizens of the country they represent, with their names published before the contest to ensure transparency. This jury judged each entry based on: vocal capacity; the stage performance; the song's composition and originality; and the overall impression by the act. In addition, no member of a national jury was permitted to be related in any way to any of the competing acts in such a way that they cannot vote impartially and independently. The individual rankings of each jury member as well as the nation's televoting results were released shortly after the grand final.

The Belarusian jury was fired after the first semi-final for partially revealing their results early and was not replaced by another jury. The "jury" vote for the final was an average of the jury votes of other countries with similar voting records. Due to an error by tabulators Digame and Ernst & Young, the wrong jury vote was presented during the live broadcast and the bottom 10 countries in the aggregate were incorrectly awarded the Belarusian points. The erroneous votes were: Australia 1, Iceland 2, Serbia 3, San Marino 4, United Kingdom 5, Spain 6, Norway 7, Germany 8, Estonia 10 and Israel 12 points. Several days after the broadcast, the EBU corrected the Belarusian jury votes, which are reflected in the table below.

==== Points awarded to Belarus ====
Points awarded to Belarus (Semi-final 1)
Score	Televote	Jury
12 points		Hungary
10 points		Estonia
8 points		Czech Republic; Slovenia
7 points	Georgia	Greece; Spain
6 points	Cyprus; Iceland	Portugal
5 points	Montenegro	
4 points	Israel; Serbia	Belgium; France; Serbia
3 points	Czech Republic	Georgia; Iceland
2 points	Australia; Greece; Poland; Slovenia	
1 point	Estonia	Israel; San Marino

Points awarded to Belarus (Final)
Score	Televote	Jury
12 points		
10 points		
8 points	Russia	Hungary
7 points		Russia
6 points		
5 points	Azerbaijan	
4 points		
3 points		
2 points		
1 point		Armenia; Azerbaijan; Estonia

==== Points awarded by Belarus ====
Points awarded by Belarus (Semi-final 1)
Score	Televote	Jury
12 points	Iceland	Estonia
10 points	Australia	Georgia
8 points	Slovenia	Australia
7 points	San Marino	Czech Republic
6 points	Estonia	Poland
5 points	Poland	Greece
4 points	Serbia	Cyprus
3 points	Czech Republic	San Marino
2 points	Portugal	Hungary
1 point	Georgia	Iceland

Points awarded by Belarus (Final)
Score	Televote	Aggregated jury
12 points	Russia	Malta
10 points	Netherlands	North Macedonia
8 points	Norway	Cyprus
7 points	Iceland	Italy
6 points	Azerbaijan	Netherlands
5 points	Slovenia	Azerbaijan
4 points	Switzerland	Switzerland
3 points	Italy	Greece
2 points	Australia	Sweden
1 point	San Marino	Russia

==== Detailed voting results ====
The following members comprised the Belarusian jury:

- Valeriy Prigun (jury chairperson) – singer
- Anastasiya Tikhanovitch – singer, producer
- Artsem Mikhalenka – singer, TV host, represented Belarus in the 2010 contest as member of 3+2
- Anzhela Mikulskaya – TV producer
- Olga Rizhikova – singer, TV host, songwriter

Detailed voting results from Belarus (Semi-final 1)
R/O	Country	Jury							Televote	
R/O	Country	A. Tikhanovitch	A. Mikhalenka	V. Prigun	A. Mikulskaya	O. Rizhikova	Rank	Points	Rank	Points
01	Cyprus	5	10	7	6	5	7	4	13	
02	Montenegro	12	11	11	14	15	13		16	
03	Finland	13	15	16	15	16	16		15	
04	Poland	10	3	5	5	4	5	6	6	5
05	Slovenia	15	12	14	13	10	14		3	8
06	Czech Republic	8	4	4	4	3	4	7	8	3
07	Hungary	4	14	9	9	9	9	2	11	
08	Belarus									
09	Serbia	9	13	13	12	13	12		7	4
10	Belgium	16	5	12	16	12	11		12	
11	Georgia	1	9	2	2	2	2	10	10	1
12	Australia	7	1	3	3	7	3	8	2	10
13	Iceland	11	6	10	11	14	10	1	1	12
14	Estonia	6	2	1	1	1	1	12	5	6
15	Portugal	14	16	15	10	11	15		9	2
16	Greece	2	7	6	7	6	6	5	14	
17	San Marino	3	8	8	8	8	8	3	4	7

An aggregate jury result was used for the final and corrected after the fact; the following table shows the revised aggregate jury result and the full televoting rankings.

Detailed voting results from Belarus (Final)
R/O	Country	Aggregated jury		Televote	
R/O	Country	Rank	Points	Rank	Points
01	Malta	1	12	19	
02	Albania	14		22	
03	Czech Republic	11		15	
04	Germany	23		23	
05	Russia	10	1	1	12
06	Denmark	15		12	
07	San Marino	19		10	1
08	North Macedonia	2	10	18	
09	Sweden	9	2	11	
10	Slovenia	12		6	5
11	Cyprus	3	8	20	
12	Netherlands	5	6	2	10
13	Greece	8	3	24	
14	Israel	25		21	
15	Norway	22		3	8
16	United Kingdom	20		25	
17	Iceland	17		4	7
18	Estonia	24		13	
19	Belarus				
20	Azerbaijan	6	5	5	6
21	France	13		14	
22	Italy	4	7	8	3
23	Serbia	18		16	
24	Switzerland	7	4	7	4
25	Australia	16		9	2
26	Spain	21		17	
