= Lizi Pop =

Musical Georgian singer, actress, model, dancer and television presenter (born 2004)

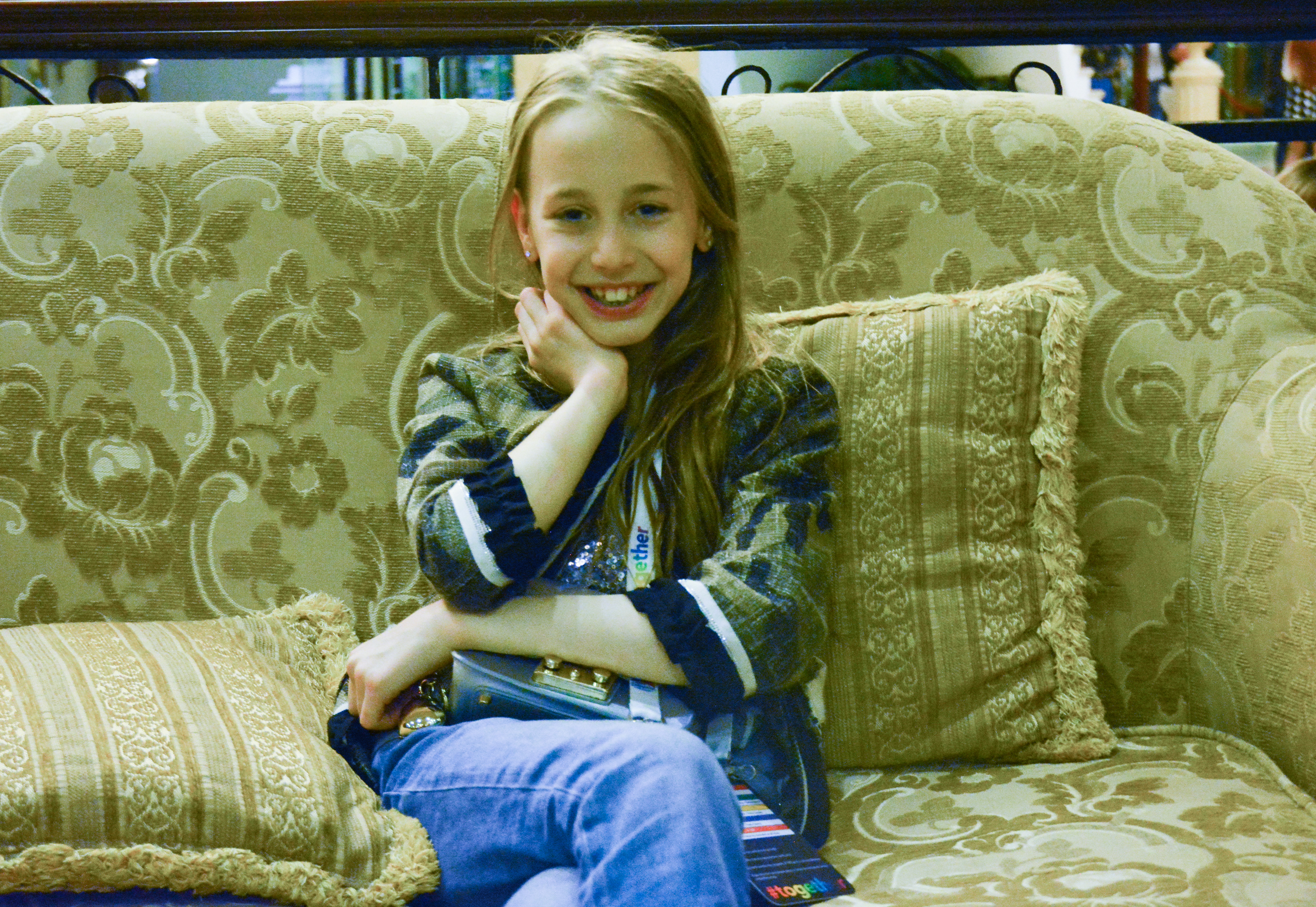
- Japaridze at the Junior Eurovision Song Contest 2014 in Malta

Background information
- Also known as: Lizi Japaridze
- Born: Liza Japaridze; 19 September 2004 (age 21); Tbilisi, Georgia
- Genres: Pop; dance-pop; electro; children's
- Occupations: Singer; actress; model; dancer; television presenter
- Instruments: Vocals; guitar
- Years active: 2011–present

Liza Japaridze (Georgian: ლიზა ჯაფარიძე; born 19 September 2004), known professionally as Lizi Pop (Georgian: ლიზი პოპი), is a Georgian singer, actress, model, dancer and television presenter. She represented Georgia in the Junior Eurovision Song Contest 2014 in Malta with the song "Happy Day" and co-hosted the Junior Eurovision Song Contest 2017 in Tbilisi with Helen Kalandadze.

== Life and career ==
=== Early life ===
Liza Japaridze was born on 19 September 2004 in Tbilisi. She studies at the Georgian-American School. Japaridze speaks English, Russian and French, in addition to her native Georgian. Since 2011, she has studied vocals at the BzikebiStudio led by Giga Kukhianidze, whose songs represented Georgia at Junior Eurovision in 2008, 2010, 2011, 2012 and 2013.

=== Career ===
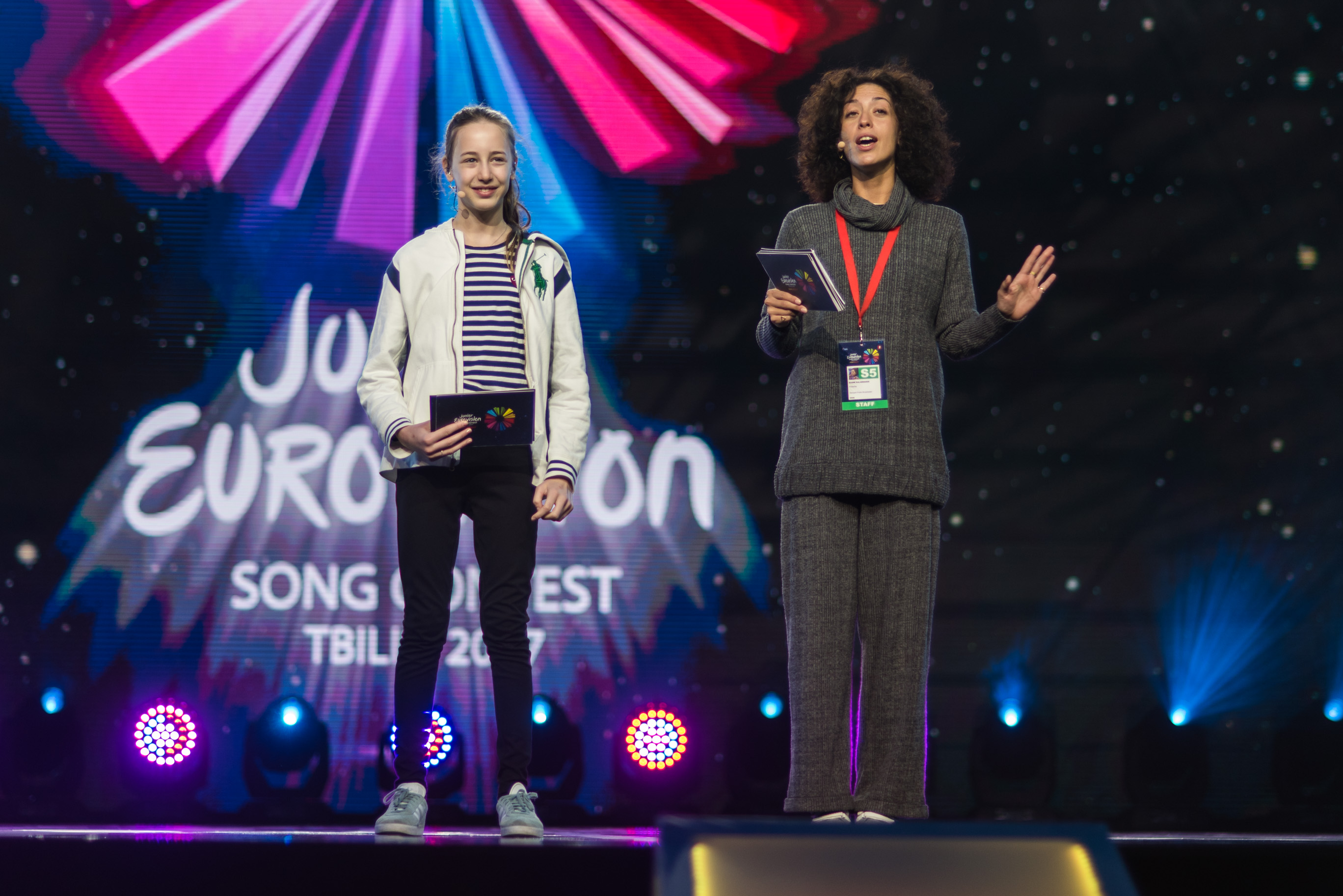
Lizi Pop (left) with Helen Kalandadze during a dress rehearsal for the Junior Eurovision Song Contest 2017 in Tbilisi

Japaridze released her debut single "Make-Up!" in 2012. She went on to release the singles "Cloud" and "Zgapari galagshi" as well, the latter of which was recorded with Candy, the winners of the Junior Eurovision Song Contest 2011. She had a starring role in the children's musical film Stapilo Story: Kurdgheli vs Mgeli.

In 2014, Japaridze was chosen to represent Georgia in the Junior Eurovision Song Contest 2014 in Malta, performing the song "Happy Day". Japaridze went on to place eleventh, the worst result for Georgia in Junior Eurovision. 'Happy Day', however, remained the most-watched video on the Junior Eurovision Song Contest channel for some years, before being overtaken by Roksana Węgiel's song Anyone I Want To Be. At Junior Eurovision, Japaridze performed with Sopho Dashniani, Dea Dashniani, Ketevan Arbolishvili, and Nita Lomidze as her backing vocalists and dancers. She was later announced as the Georgian spokesperson at the Junior Eurovision Song Contest 2015.

Japaridze hosted the Junior Eurovision Song Contest 2017 in Tbilisi alongside Helen Kalandadze. She is the second youngest ever to host the contest, only behind Ioana Ivan, who was only 12 when she hosted in 2006 and the first former participant to host the contest.

In 2021, she released a single called "Desire", composed by herself and Giga Kukhianidze. She wrote the lyrics of the song "On Replay" performed by Bzikebi, which represented Georgia in the Eurovision Song Contest 2026.

== Discography ==
=== Singles ===
Year	Title	Album
2012	"Make-Up!"	Non-album single(s)
2013	"Cloud"	Non-album single(s)
2013	"Zgapari galagshi" (with Candy)	Non-album single(s)
2014	"Happy Day"	Non-album single(s)
2015	"An Unloved Child's Pain"	Non-album single(s)
2016	"Our Future"	Non-album single(s)
2020	"Toxic World"	Non-album single(s)

Awards and achievements
Preceded by The Smile Shop with Give Me Your Smile	Georgia in the Junior Eurovision Song Contest; 2014	Succeeded by The Virus with Gabede
Preceded by (Malta) Ben Camille and Valerie Vella	Junior Eurovision Song Contest presenter 2017; With: Helen Kalandadze	Succeeded by (Belarus) Helena Meraai, Eugene Perlin and Zena
