= Georgia in the Eurovision Song Contest 2026 =

- Eurovision Song Contest 2026
- Participating broadcaster: Georgian Public Broadcaster (GPB)
- Country: Georgia
- Selection process: Internal selection
- Announcement date: Artist: 14 January 2026; Song: 11 March 2026

Competing entry
- Song: "On Replay"
- Artist: Bzikebi
- Songwriters: Giga Kukhianidze; Liza Japaridze

Placement
- Semi-final result: Failed to qualify (15th)

Participation chronology

Georgia was represented at the Eurovision Song Contest 2026 with the song "On Replay", written by Giga Kukhianidze and Liza Japaridze, and performed by the group Bzikebi. The Georgian participating broadcaster, the Georgian Public Broadcaster (GPB), internally selected its entry for the contest.

== Background ==
Prior to the 2026 contest, the Georgian Public Broadcaster (GPB) had participated in the Eurovision Song Contest seventeen times since its first entry in 2007. Its highest placing in the contest, to this point, has been ninth place, which was achieved on two occasions: in 2010 with the song "Shine" performed by Sofia Nizharadze, and in 2011 with the song "One More Day" performed by Eldrine. GPB briefly withdrew from the contest in 2009 after the European Broadcasting Union (EBU) rejected its entry, "We Don't Wanna Put In", for perceived political references to Vladimir Putin who was the Russian Prime Minister at the time. The withdrawal and fallout was tied to tense relations between Georgia and then host country Russia, which stemmed from the 2008 Russo-Georgian War. Georgia has, to this point, qualified to the final on eight occasions. In 2025, the song "Freedom" performed by Mariam Shengelia failed to qualify for the grand final, placing 15th out of all 16 participating countries in the semi final with 28 points.

As part of its duties as participating broadcaster, GPB organises the selection of its entry in the Eurovision Song Contest and broadcasts the event in the country. GPB was announced as one of the participants for Eurovision 2026 on 15 December 2025. The broadcaster has selected its entry for the Eurovision Song Contest both through national finals and internal selections in the past. In 2025, GPB opted to internally select its entry, a method which was continued for its 2026 participation.

== Before Eurovision ==
=== Internal selection ===
On 14 January 2026, GPB announced that it had internally selected Bzikebi, who had previously won the Junior Eurovision Song Contest 2008, to represent Georgia at the 2026 contest. They were reported to have recorded their song around 27 February—1 March 2026, with producer Giga Kukhianidze. The entry, titled "On Replay", was released on 11 March; it was composed by Kukhianidze with lyrics by Lizi Pop, who represented Georgia in Junior Eurovision 2014.

== At Eurovision ==
The Eurovision Song Contest 2026 took place at the Wiener Stadthalle in Vienna, Austria, and consisted of two semi-finals held on the respective dates of 12 and 14 May and the final on 16 May 2026. All nations with the exceptions of the host country and the "Big Four" (France, Germany, Italy and the United Kingdom) were required to qualify from one of two semi-finals in order to compete for the final; the top ten countries from each semi-final progressed to the final. On 12 January 2026, an allocation draw was held to determine which of the two semi-finals, as well as which half of the show, each country performed in; the European Broadcasting Union (EBU) split up the competing countries into different pots based on voting patterns from previous contests, with countries with favourable voting histories put into the same pot.

=== Semi final ===
Georgia was allocated for the first semi final, and later, was announced to perform in position six during the show. Shortly after, the qualification–announcement segment took place, and, at the end of the segment Georgia was not announced as one of the ten qualifiers, therefore, Georgia would not move on onto the final.

=== Voting ===
Below is a breakdown of points awarded to Georgia and awarded by Georgia in the second semi-final and grand final of the contest, and the breakdown of the jury voting and televoting conducted during the two shows:

==== Points awarded to Georgia ====
Points awarded to Georgia (Semi-final 1)
| Score | Televote | Jury |
|---|---|---|
| 12 points | | |
| 10 points | | |
| 8 points | | |
| 7 points | | |
| 6 points | | |
| 5 points | | |
| 4 points | | |
| 3 points | | |
| 2 points | Greece | San Marino |
| 1 point | | Israel |

==== Points awarded by Georgia ====
Points awarded by Georgia (Semi-final 1)
| Score | Televote | Jury |
|---|---|---|
| 12 points | Israel | Finland |
| 10 points | Moldova | Greece |
| 8 points | Serbia | Sweden |
| 7 points | Greece | Moldova |
| 6 points | Lithuania | Serbia |
| 5 points | Montenegro | Israel |
| 4 points | Finland | San Marino |
| 3 points | Poland | Croatia |
| 2 points | Belgium | Poland |
| 1 point | Croatia | Lithuania |

Points awarded by Georgia (Final)
| Score | Televote | Jury |
|---|---|---|
| 12 points | Ukraine | France |
| 10 points | Israel | Italy |
| 8 points | Moldova | Cyprus |
| 7 points | Romania | Finland |
| 6 points | Bulgaria | Israel |
| 5 points | Greece | Norway |
| 4 points | Denmark | Malta |
| 3 points | Serbia | Bulgaria |
| 2 points | Australia | Poland |
| 1 point | Finland | Czech Republic |

==== Detailed voting results ====
Each participating broadcaster assembles a seven-member jury panel consisting of music industry professionals who are citizens of the country they represent and two of which have to be between 18 and 25 years old. Each jury, and individual jury member, is required to meet a strict set of criteria regarding professional background, as well as diversity in gender and age. No member of a national jury was permitted to be related in any way to any of the competing acts in such a way that they cannot vote impartially and independently. The individual rankings of each jury member as well as the nation's televoting results were released shortly after the grand final.

The following members comprised the Georgian jury:

- Giorgi Asanishvili
- Kakhaber Grigalashvili
- Onise Kakhniashvili
- Ani Tatinashvili
- Eliso Shengelia
- Irine Sanikidze
- Medea Meko Kavtaradze

Detailed voting results from Georgia (Semi-final 1)
| R/O | Country | Jury | | | | | | | | | Televote | |
| R/O | Country | Juror A | Juror B | Juror C | Juror D | Juror E | Juror F | Juror G | Rank | Points | Rank | Points |
|---|---|---|---|---|---|---|---|---|---|---|---|---|
| 01 | Moldova | 3 | 3 | 5 | 5 | 4 | 5 | 5 | 4 | 7 | 2 | 10 |
| 02 | Sweden | 4 | 1 | 2 | 4 | 3 | 7 | 3 | 3 | 8 | 13 | |
| 03 | Croatia | 14 | 9 | 7 | 9 | 8 | 3 | 10 | 8 | 3 | 10 | 1 |
| 04 | Greece | 1 | 4 | 3 | 2 | 2 | 2 | 1 | 2 | 10 | 4 | 7 |
| 05 | Portugal | 13 | 12 | 14 | 14 | 11 | 13 | 12 | 14 | | 11 | |
| 06 | Georgia | | | | | | | | | | | |
| 07 | Finland | 2 | 2 | 1 | 1 | 1 | 1 | 2 | 1 | 12 | 7 | 4 |
| 08 | Montenegro | 12 | 11 | 12 | 8 | 13 | 14 | 11 | 11 | | 6 | 5 |
| 09 | Estonia | 9 | 14 | 9 | 13 | 14 | 11 | 13 | 12 | | 14 | |
| 10 | Israel | 6 | 5 | 6 | 7 | 6 | 6 | 4 | 6 | 5 | 1 | 12 |
| 11 | Belgium | 11 | 10 | 13 | 12 | 12 | 12 | 14 | 13 | | 9 | 2 |
| 12 | Lithuania | 8 | 8 | 10 | 10 | 10 | 9 | 9 | 10 | 1 | 5 | 6 |
| 13 | San Marino | 10 | 7 | 8 | 6 | 7 | 8 | 8 | 7 | 4 | 12 | |
| 14 | Poland | 7 | 13 | 11 | 11 | 9 | 4 | 7 | 9 | 2 | 8 | 3 |
| 15 | Serbia | 5 | 6 | 4 | 3 | 5 | 10 | 6 | 5 | 6 | 3 | 8 |

Detailed voting results from Georgia (Final)
| R/O | Country | Jury | | | | | | | | | Televote | |
| R/O | Country | Juror A | Juror B | Juror C | Juror D | Juror E | Juror F | Juror G | Rank | Points | Rank | Points |
|---|---|---|---|---|---|---|---|---|---|---|---|---|
| 01 | Denmark | 21 | 21 | 15 | 19 | 18 | 17 | 18 | 22 | | 7 | 4 |
| 02 | Germany | 4 | 20 | 16 | 18 | 14 | 10 | 19 | 18 | | 25 | |
| 03 | Israel | 6 | 5 | 7 | 8 | 10 | 5 | 6 | 5 | 6 | 2 | 10 |
| 04 | Belgium | 12 | 10 | 17 | 20 | 8 | 3 | 14 | 12 | | 23 | |
| 05 | Albania | 14 | 6 | 20 | 16 | 9 | 4 | 11 | 11 | | 16 | |
| 06 | Greece | 13 | 8 | 19 | 4 | 20 | 11 | 16 | 17 | | 6 | 5 |
| 07 | Ukraine | 10 | 9 | 8 | 10 | 17 | 7 | 17 | 14 | | 1 | 12 |
| 08 | Australia | 3 | 19 | 25 | 5 | 11 | 22 | 21 | 13 | | 9 | 2 |
| 09 | Serbia | 25 | 23 | 18 | 24 | 24 | 23 | 23 | 25 | | 8 | 3 |
| 10 | Malta | 7 | 2 | 22 | 17 | 4 | 12 | 12 | 7 | 4 | 14 | |
| 11 | Czechia | 9 | 17 | 21 | 6 | 2 | 18 | 15 | 10 | 1 | 12 | |
| 12 | Bulgaria | 16 | 4 | 13 | 9 | 15 | 8 | 3 | 8 | 3 | 5 | 6 |
| 13 | Croatia | 17 | 22 | 14 | 22 | 21 | 19 | 22 | 24 | | 15 | |
| 14 | United Kingdom | 19 | 18 | 23 | 14 | 25 | 15 | 25 | 23 | | 21 | |
| 15 | France | 1 | 1 | 12 | 1 | 3 | 6 | 8 | 1 | 12 | 17 | |
| 16 | Moldova | 18 | 24 | 24 | 13 | 23 | 9 | 9 | 21 | | 3 | 8 |
| 17 | Finland | 2 | 13 | 11 | 3 | 16 | 14 | 1 | 4 | 7 | 10 | 1 |
| 18 | Poland | 11 | 14 | 4 | 25 | 12 | 2 | 13 | 9 | 2 | 19 | |
| 19 | Lithuania | 24 | 16 | 3 | 23 | 19 | 24 | 24 | 20 | | 13 | |
| 20 | Sweden | 22 | 15 | 2 | 11 | 13 | 25 | 20 | 16 | | 22 | |
| 21 | Cyprus | 8 | 7 | 1 | 12 | 5 | 21 | 2 | 3 | 8 | 20 | |
| 22 | Italy | 5 | 3 | 5 | 2 | 1 | 13 | 5 | 2 | 10 | 11 | |
| 23 | Norway | 20 | 25 | 6 | 15 | 7 | 1 | 4 | 6 | 5 | 18 | |
| 24 | Romania | 15 | 11 | 9 | 21 | 22 | 16 | 7 | 19 | | 4 | 7 |
| 25 | Austria | 23 | 12 | 10 | 7 | 6 | 20 | 10 | 15 | | 24 | |
