= Zinaida Kupriyanovich =

Zinaida Kupriyanovich Зінаі́да Купрыяно́віч
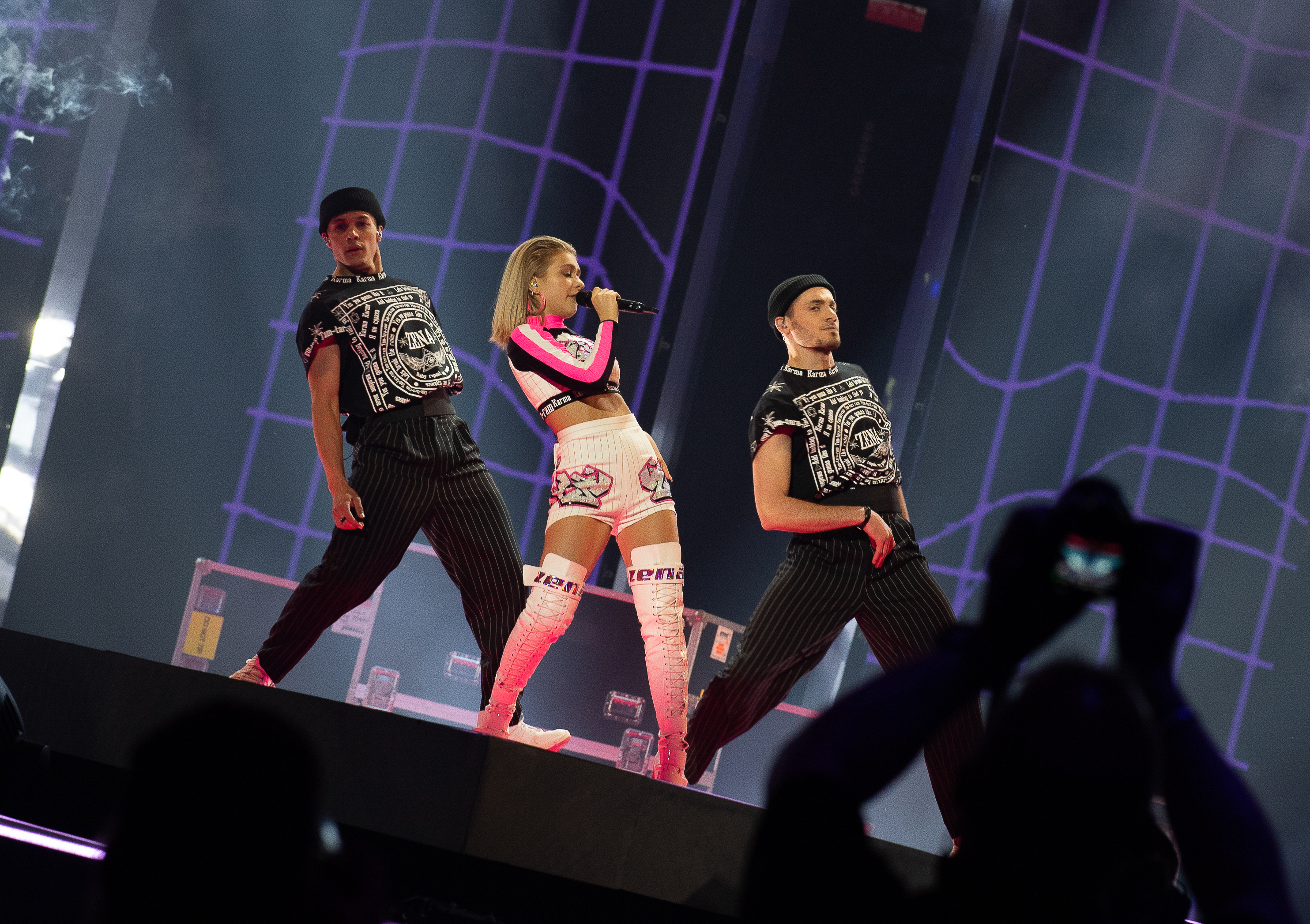
- Kupriyanovich performing at Eurovision 2019

Background information
- Also known as: Zina Kupriyanovich; Zena; Zina Bless
- Born: Zinaida Alexandrovna Kupriyanovich; 17 September 2002 (age 23); Minsk, Belarus
- Genres: Pop
- Occupations: Singer; actress; television presenter
- Instrument: Vocals
- Years active: 2013–present
- Website: Instagram page YouTube channel

Zinaida Alexandrovna Kupriyanovich (Note: Belarusian: Зінаі́да Алякса́ндраўна Купрыяно́віч, romanized: Zinaída Alyaksándrawna Kupryanóvich, Łacinka: Zinaída Alaksándraŭna Kupryjanóvič; Russian: Зинаи́да Алекса́ндровна Куприяно́вич, romanized: Zinaída Aleksándrovna Kupriyanóvich.) (born 17 September 2002), sometimes known professionally as Zina Kupriyanovich, Zena, and Zina Bless, is a Belarusian singer, actress, and television presenter. Kupriyanovich represented Belarus in the Eurovision Song Contest 2019 with the song "Like It", placing 24th in the final. She has additionally cohosted the Junior Eurovision Song Contest 2018 in Minsk, and voiced the Russian dub of the eponymous character in the film Moana (2016).

== Career ==
Kupriyanovich began her career as a child singer in 2013, competing in New Wave Junior 2013 and 2014 Junior Slavianski Bazaar in Vitebsk.

Kupriyanovich competed in the Belarusian national final for the Junior Eurovision Song Contest twice; she placed fourth in 2015 with the song "Mir" and third in 2016 with the song "Kosmos". In 2017, she placed third in the tenth season of Fabrika Zvyozd, the Russian version of Operación Triunfo. Afterwards, Kupriyanovich began a career in television presenting, and co-hosted the Junior Eurovision Song Contest 2018 in Minsk alongside Evgeny Perlin and Helena Meraai. As an actress, she has voiced the Russian dub of the character Moana in the films Moana and Ralph Breaks the Internet.

She represented Belarus in the Eurovision Song Contest 2019 with the song "Like It". She qualified to the final, where she scored 31 points, finishing 24th out of 26 countries. Due to the cancellation of the 2020 contest, Belarus' disqualification from the 2021 contest, and BTRC's subsequent suspension from the EBU, Kupriyanovich indefinitely remains the last Belarusian representative at the Eurovision Song Contest (the last Belarusian at any Eurovision event was Arina Pehtereva in the Junior Eurovision Song Contest 2020).

== Discography ==
=== EPs ===
Title	Details
Na grani	Released: August 6, 2021; Label: Independent release; Formats: Digital download, streaming
Tantsy pod Lunoy	Released: August 27, 2021; Label: Independent release; Formats: Digital download, streaming
Nebezobidnyy	Released: September 17, 2021; Label: Independent release; Formats: Digital download, streaming
Yunost'	Released: October 15, 2021; Label: Independent release; Formats: Digital download, streaming

=== Singles ===
Title	Year	Album
"Mir"	2015	Non-album singles
"Kosmos"	2016	Non-album singles
"Like It"	2019	Non-album singles
"Groza i Muza"	2021	Non-album singles
"Ladies" (with Freddy Red)	2021	Non-album singles
"Na grani"	2021	Na grani
"Slightly"	2021	Na grani
"Karavella"	2021	Na grani
"Tantsy pod Lunoy"	2021	Tantsy pod Lunoy
"Blue Air"	2021	Tantsy pod Lunoy
"Odni"	2021	Tantsy pod Lunoy
"Nebezobidnyy"	2021	Nebezobidnyy
"Ty uvolen"	2021	Nebezobidnyy
"Broken Car"	2021	Yunost'
"Koleso"	2022	Non-album singles
"Squad"	2022	Non-album singles
"Easy"	2022	Non-album singles
"Wfk"	2022	Non-album singles
"So What"	2022	Non-album singles
"Unesla"	2023	Non-album singles
"Yad"	2023	Non-album singles

== Filmography ==
Year	Title	Role	Notes
2016	Moana	Moana	Russian version
2018	Ralph Breaks the Internet	Moana	Russian version
2021	Sunny Bunnies: The Cinema Express	Emilie "Emily"	Short Film

== Notes ==
Awards and achievements
Preceded by (Georgia (country)) Helen Kalandadze and Lizi Japaridze	Junior Eurovision Song Contest presenter 2018; With: Evgeny Perlin and Helena Meraai	Succeeded by (Poland) Ida Nowakowska, Aleksander Sikora and Roksana Węgiel
Preceded by Alekseev with "Forever"	Belarus in the Eurovision Song Contest; 2019	Succeeded by VAL with "Da vidna"(Да відна)
