= Pyanoye solntse =

Single by Alekseev

from the album Drunken Sun
- Released: September 13, 2015
- Label: Zion Music
- Composer: Ruslan Kvint
- Lyricist: Vitaly Kurovsky

Alekseev singles chronology
"А я плыву" (2015)	"Pyanoye solntse" (2015)	"Снов осколки" (2016)

"Pyanoye solntse" (Russian: Пьяное солнце – Drunken Sun) is a Russian-language song by Ukrainian singer Alekseev. It was released on September 13, 2015 and stayed number one on the Russian ITunes chart for 6 weeks after release, it also ranked second for radio airplay in Ukraine the week of its release. The song hit 52nd place on Shazam's Top-100 world chart, making it the first Russian-language song to place on Shazam's World Chart.

== Song ==
Composer Ruslan Kvint and poet Vitaly Kurovsky are behind the creation of the song. According to Ruslan himself, he had dreamt of the melody in his sleep and woke up at 5 am to record it on a dictaphone. The next day, Ruslan called his usual co-author Vitaly, who wrote the lyrics for the song in only a few hours. The single was then released on September 13, 2015.

== Music video ==
At the end of October a music video for the song was released on YouTube. It was directed by Alan Badoev, who offered to make the video for free in an effort to spread Ukrainian music. It is also noteworthy that Alekseev almost died on set after having to jump into freezing water. The video has 43 million views as of December 2019.

== Awards and nominations ==
Year	Award Program	Award Title	Result
2016	MUZ-TV Awards	Song of the Year For "Пьяное солнце" (Drunken Sun)	Nominated
2016	RU.TV Awards	Song of the Year For "Пьяное солнце" (Drunken Sun)	Won
2016	Golden Gramophone Award	For "Пьяное солнце" (Drunken Sun)	Won
2016	Top League Awards	Song of the Year For "Пьяное солнце" (Drunken Sun)	Won
2016	TopHit Music Awards	Most Frequently Played Track on the Radio	Won
2016	TopHit Music Awards	Song of the Year For "Пьяное солнце" (Drunken Sun)	Won
2016	OOPS! Video Awards	Best Music Video for "Пьяное солнце" (Drunken Sun)	Won
2017	Russian national music awards	Best Male Music Video for "Пьяное солнце" (Drunken Sun)	Nominated

== Charts ==
Chart (2015)	Peak position
Audience Choice Top 100	2
CIS (Tophit Annual General)	9
CIS (Tophit General Top 100)	1
Russia (Tophit Russian Top 100)	1
Russia (Tophit Moscow Top 100)	7
Russia (Tophit Saint-Petersburg Top 100)	4
Ukraine (Tophit Ukrainian Top 100)	2
Ukraine (Tophit Kiev Top 100)	3
