= List of Junior Eurovision Song Contest presenters =

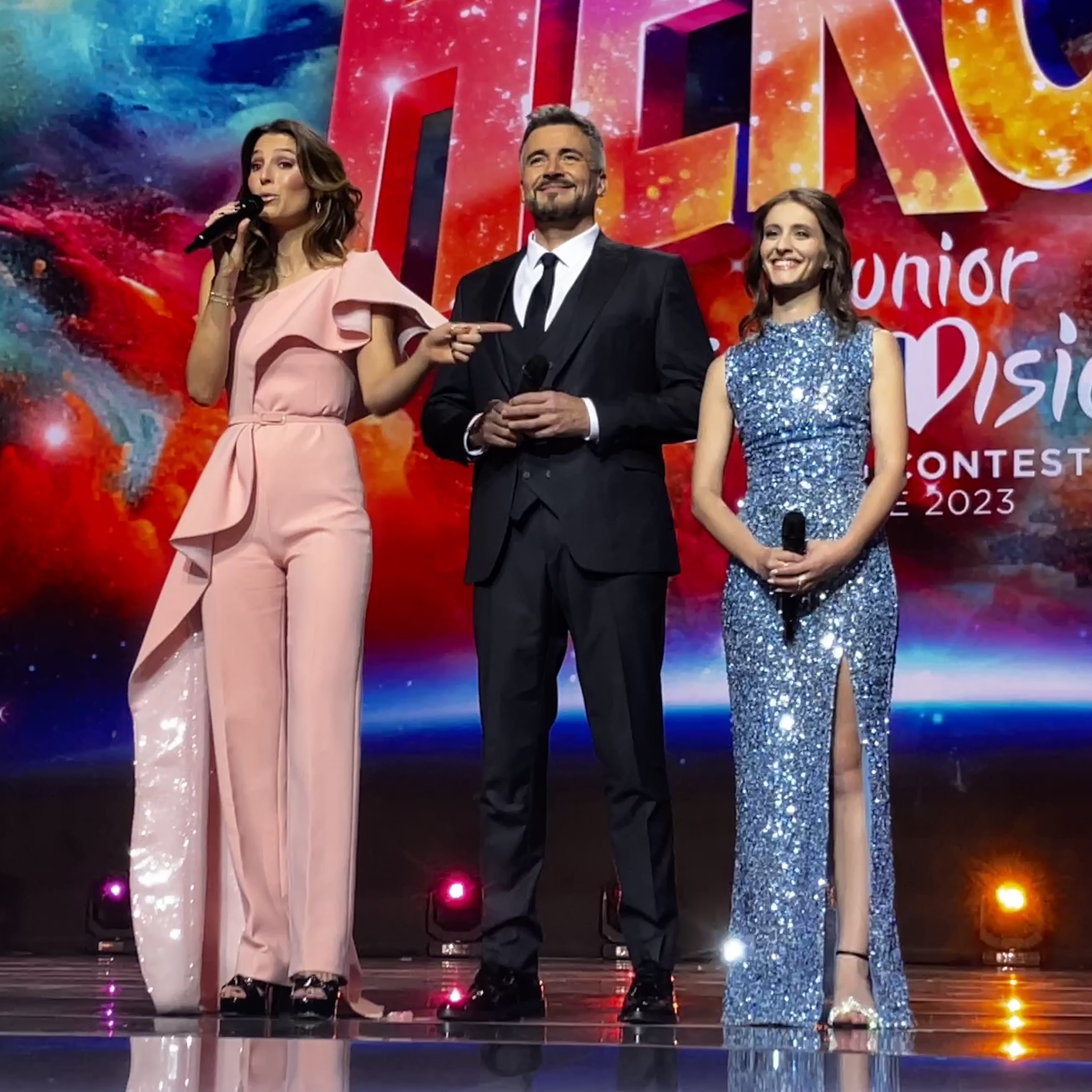
Presenters of the 2023 contest, from left to right: Laury Thilleman, Olivier Minne and Ophenya.

The Junior Eurovision Song Contest is an annual international song competition organized by the European Broadcasting Union (EBU) since 2003. This page is a list of those who have been presenters at the contest.

Two presenters typically host the competition. However, there were three presenters in 2009, from 2018 to 2021, and in 2023; four presenters in 2022; and just one presenter in 2014 and 2015. Kim-Lian van der Meij (Netherlands), Timur Miroshnychenko (Ukraine), Ida Nowakowska (Poland), and Olivier Minne (France) have been the only presenters to host the contest twice: Kim-Lian in 2007 and 2012, Miroshnychenko in 2009 and 2013, Nowakowska in 2019 and 2020, and Minne in 2021 and 2023.

== Presenters ==
Year	Presenter(s)	Ref.
2003	Camilla Ottesen and Remee	
2004	Stian Barsnes Simonsen and Nadia Hasnaoui	
2005	Marcel Vanthilt and Maureen Louys	
2006	Andreea Marin Bănică and Ioana Ivan	
2007	Sipke Jan Bousema and Kim-Lian van der Meij	
2008	Alex Michael and Sophia Paraskeva	
2009	Ani Lorak, Timur Miroshnychenko and Dmytro Borodin (green room)	
2010	Leila Ismailava and Denis Kourian	
2011	Gohar Gasparyan and Avet Barseghyan	
2012	Kim-Lian van der Meij and Ewout Genemans	
2013	Timur Miroshnychenko and Zlata Ognevich	
2014	Moira Delia	
2015	Poli Genova	
2016	Ben Camille and Valerie Vella	
2017	Helen Kalandadze and Lizi Japaridze	
2018	Evgeny Perlin, Zinaida Kupriyanovich and Helena Meraai (green room)	
2019	Ida Nowakowska, Aleksander Sikora and Roksana Węgiel	
2020	Ida Nowakowska, Rafał Brzozowski and Małgorzata Tomaszewska	
2021	Carla Lazzari, Élodie Gossuin and Olivier Minne	
2022	Iveta Mukuchyan, Garik Papoyan, Karina Ignatyan and Robin the Robot	
2023	Olivier Minne, Laury Thilleman and Ophenya (green room)	
2024	Ruth Lorenzo, Marc Clotet and Melani García	
2025	David Aladashvili and Liza Tsiklauri	
2026	Gaia Cauchi, Destiny Chukunyere and Keane Cutajar	

=== Opening Ceremony presenters ===
Year	Presenter(s)	Ref.
2007	Sipke Jan Bousema and Kim-Lian van der Meij	
2012	Ewout Genemans and Kim-Lian van der Meij	
2013	Timur Miroshnychenko and Elizabeth Arfush	
2014	Gianni Zammit	
2015	Joanna Dragneva	
2016	Taryn Mamo Cefai	
2017	Liza Tsiklauri and Mariam Mamadashvili	
2018	Denis Dudinsky and Anna Kviloria	
2019	Agata Konarska and Mateusz Szymkowiak	
2020	Mateusz Szymkowiak	
2021	Carla Lazzari	
2022	Dalita, Hamlet Arakelyan and Aram Mp3	
2023	Carla Lazzari, Manon Théodet and Laura Tenoudji	

=== Presenters born outside the host country ===
- Nadia Hasnaoui: born in Morocco to a Moroccan father and Norwegian mother.
- Zlata Ognevich: born in Murmansk, Russian SFSR, Soviet Union (present-day Russia).
- Olivier Minne: born in Belgium to a Belgian father and French mother.
- Karina Ignatyan: born in Kaluga, Russia.

=== Presenters who also appeared at Eurovision ===
Presenter	Eurovision appearance
Ani Lorak	Represented Ukraine in 2008, finished 2nd place.
Camilla Ottesen	Presented Danish results in 2004.
Nadia Hasnaoui	Co-hosted in 2010, presented Norwegian results in 2011 and 2012.
Maureen Louys	Gave out Belgian votes in 2007, 2009, and 2011.
Remee	Co-wrote German entry in 2008, Danish entries in 2012, 2015, and 2022.
Andreea Marin Bănică	Presented Romanian votes in 2000, 2004, 2006, and 2007.
Denis Kourian	Commentator for Belarus, presented points in 2004.
Leila Ismailava	Presented Belarusian votes in 2011.
Avet Barseghyan	Co-wrote Armenian entry in 2017.
Zlata Ognevich	Represented Ukraine in 2013, finished 3rd place.
Moira Delia	Presented Maltese votes in 2006 and 2008.
Poli Genova	Represented Bulgaria in 2011 and 2016, finished 4th place in 2016.
Valerie Vella	Presented Maltese votes in 2000 and 2005.
Ben Camille	Presented Maltese votes in 2016 and 2019.
Timur Miroshnychenko	Co-hosted in 2017, Ukrainian commentator since 2007, co-presented the Opening Ceremony in 2023
Zinaida Kupriyanovich	Represented Belarus in 2019.
Rafał Brzozowski	Represented Poland in 2021.
Ida Nowakowska	Presented Polish votes in 2021, 2022, and 2023.
Mateusz Szymkowiak	Presented Polish votes in 2018 and 2019.
Aleksander Sikora	Polish commentator in 2021, 2022, and 2023.
Élodie Gossuin	Presented French votes in 2016, 2017, 2018, and 2022.
Olivier Minne	Presented French votes in 1992 and 1993, commentator between 1995 and 1997.
Carla Lazzari	Presented French votes in 2021.
Iveta Mukuchyan	Represented Armenia in 2016.
Ruth Lorenzo	Represented Spain in 2014, presented Spanish votes in 2023.
Liza Tsiklauri	Presented Georgian votes in 2013.
Destiny Chukunyere	Represented Malta in 2021, finished in 7th place.

=== Presenters who formerly competed at Junior Eurovision ===
- Gaia Cauchi, winner for Malta in 2013.
- Lizi Japaridze, represented Georgia in 2014.
- Destiny Chukunyere, winner for Malta in 2015.
- Helena Meraai, represented Belarus in 2017.
- Roksana Węgiel, winner for Poland in 2018.
- Carla Lazzari, represented France in 2019.
- Karina Ignatyan, represented Armenia in 2019.
- Melani García, represented Spain in 2019.

== Gallery ==
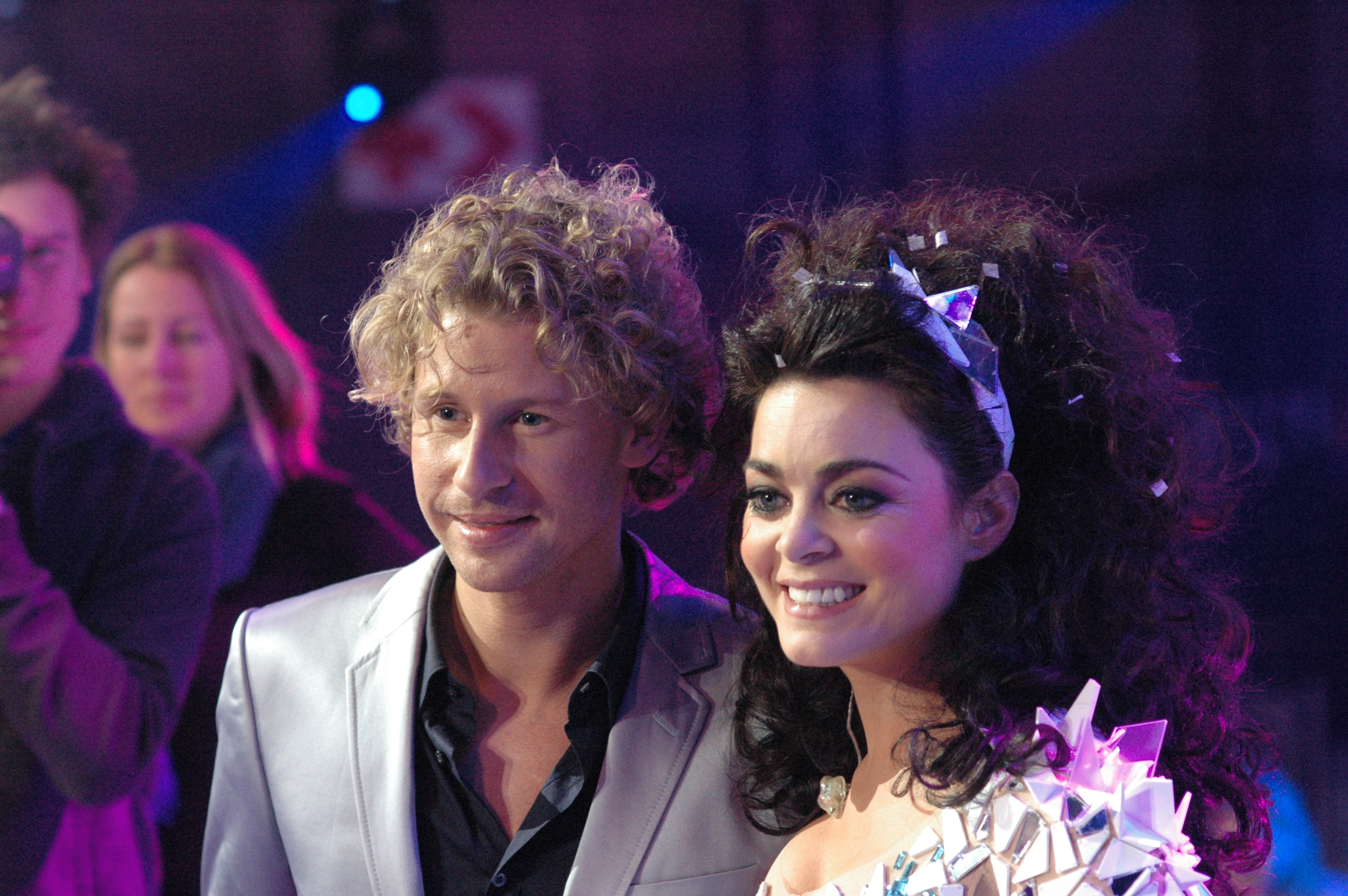
Ewout Genemans co-hosted the 2012 contest alongside 2007 co-host Kim-Lian van der Meij.

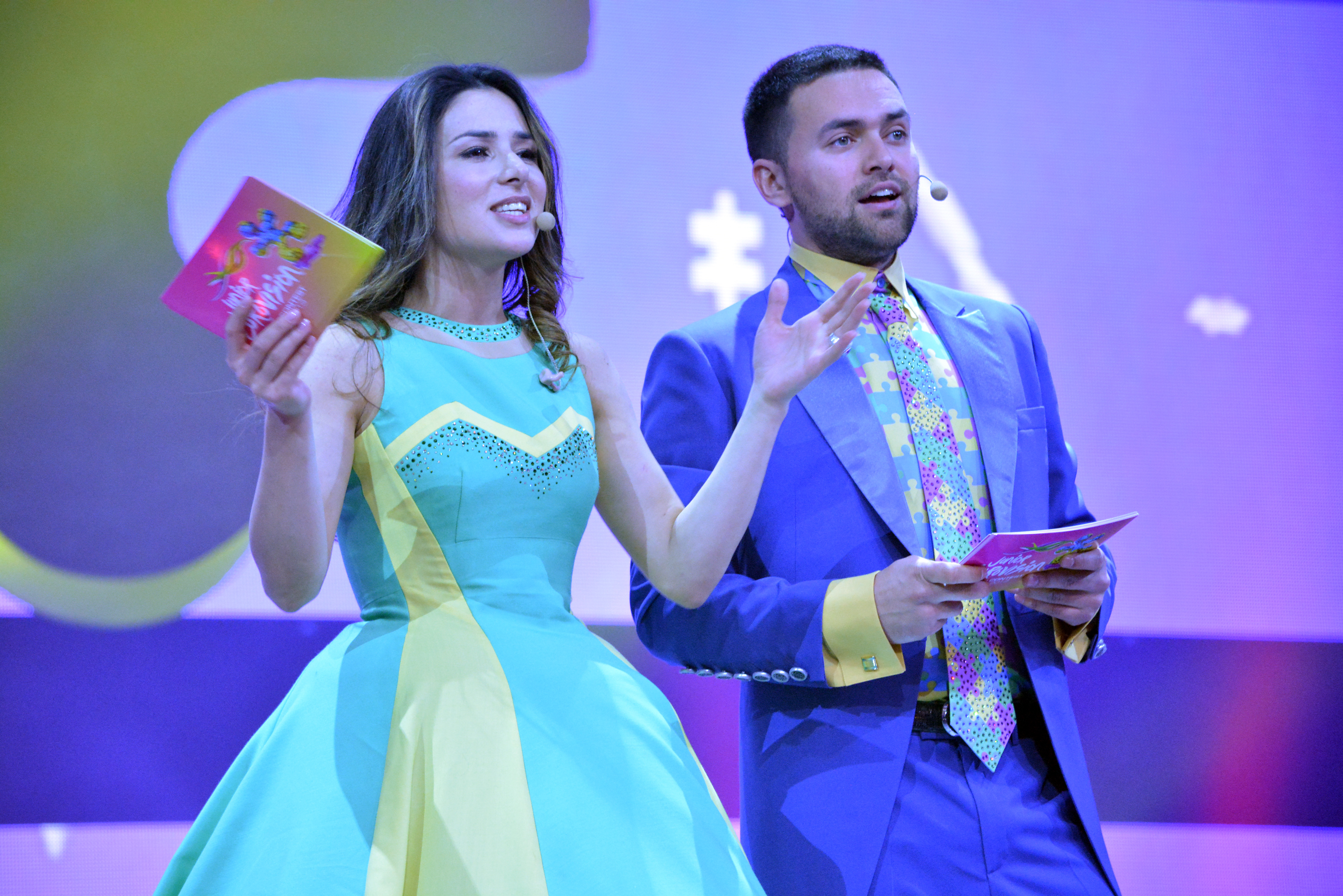
Zlata Ognevich co-hosted the contest in 2013 alongside 2009 co-host Timur Miroshnychenko.

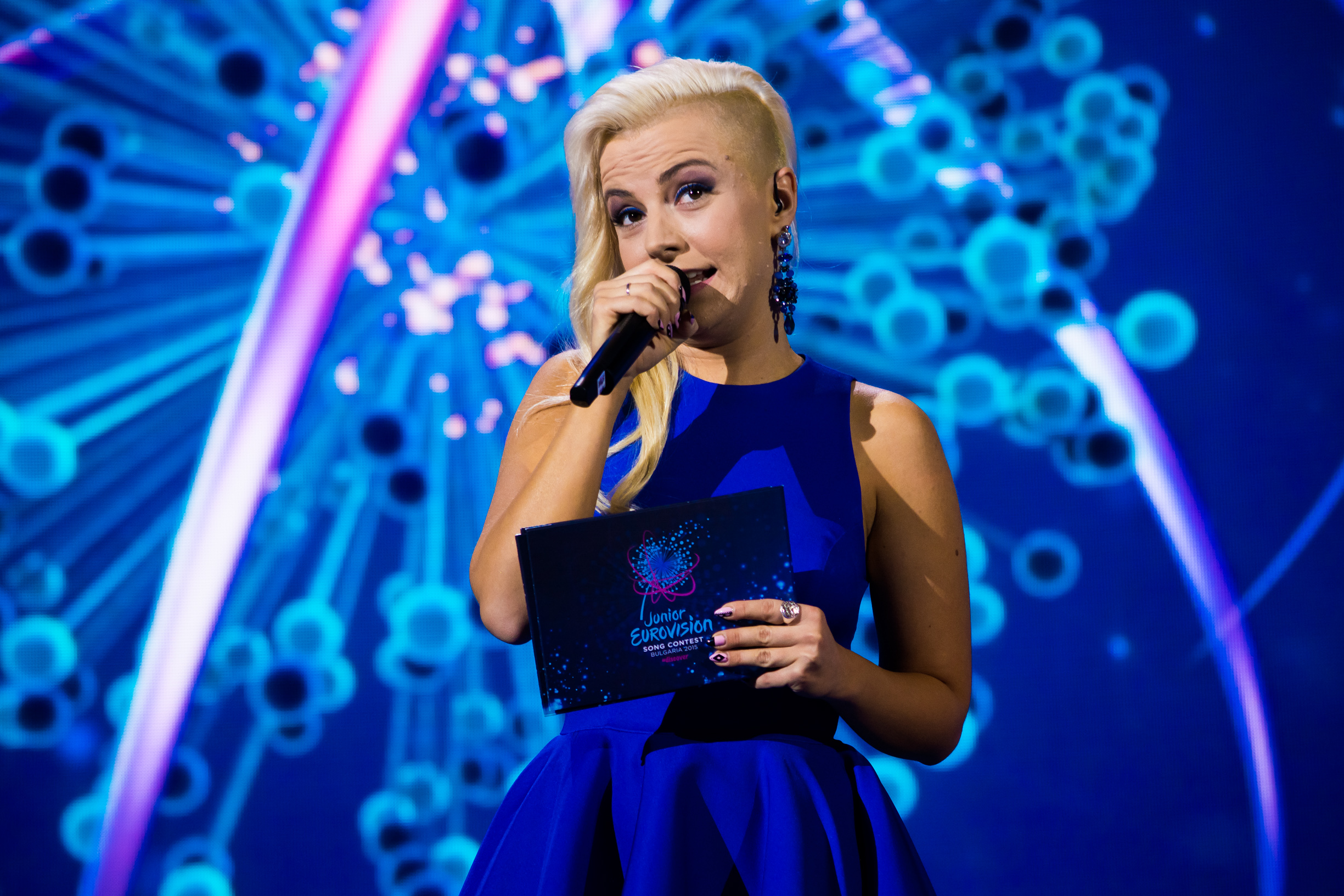
2015 hostess: Poli Genova at the contest

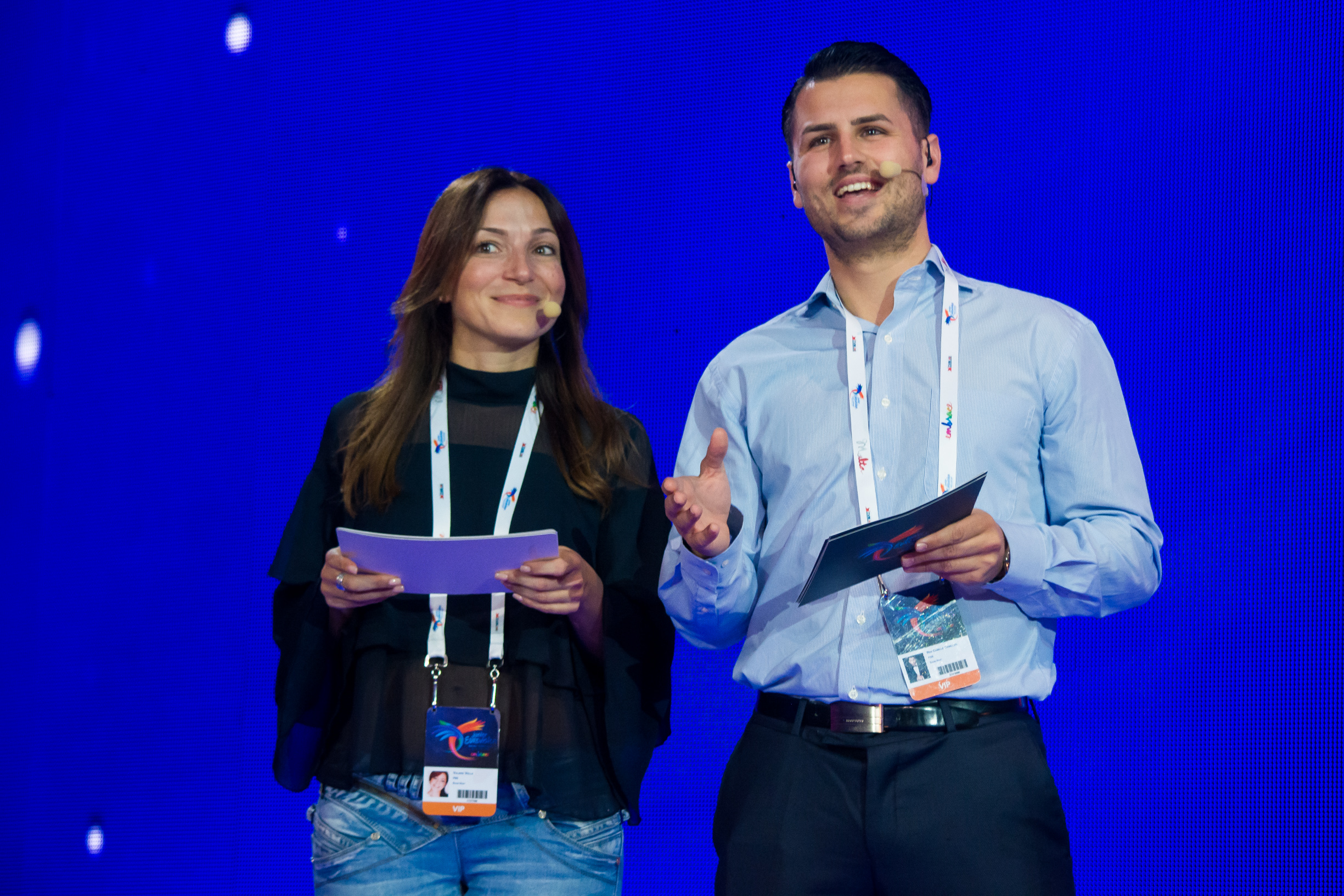
2016 hosts: Ben Camille and Valerie Vella during a dress rehearsal

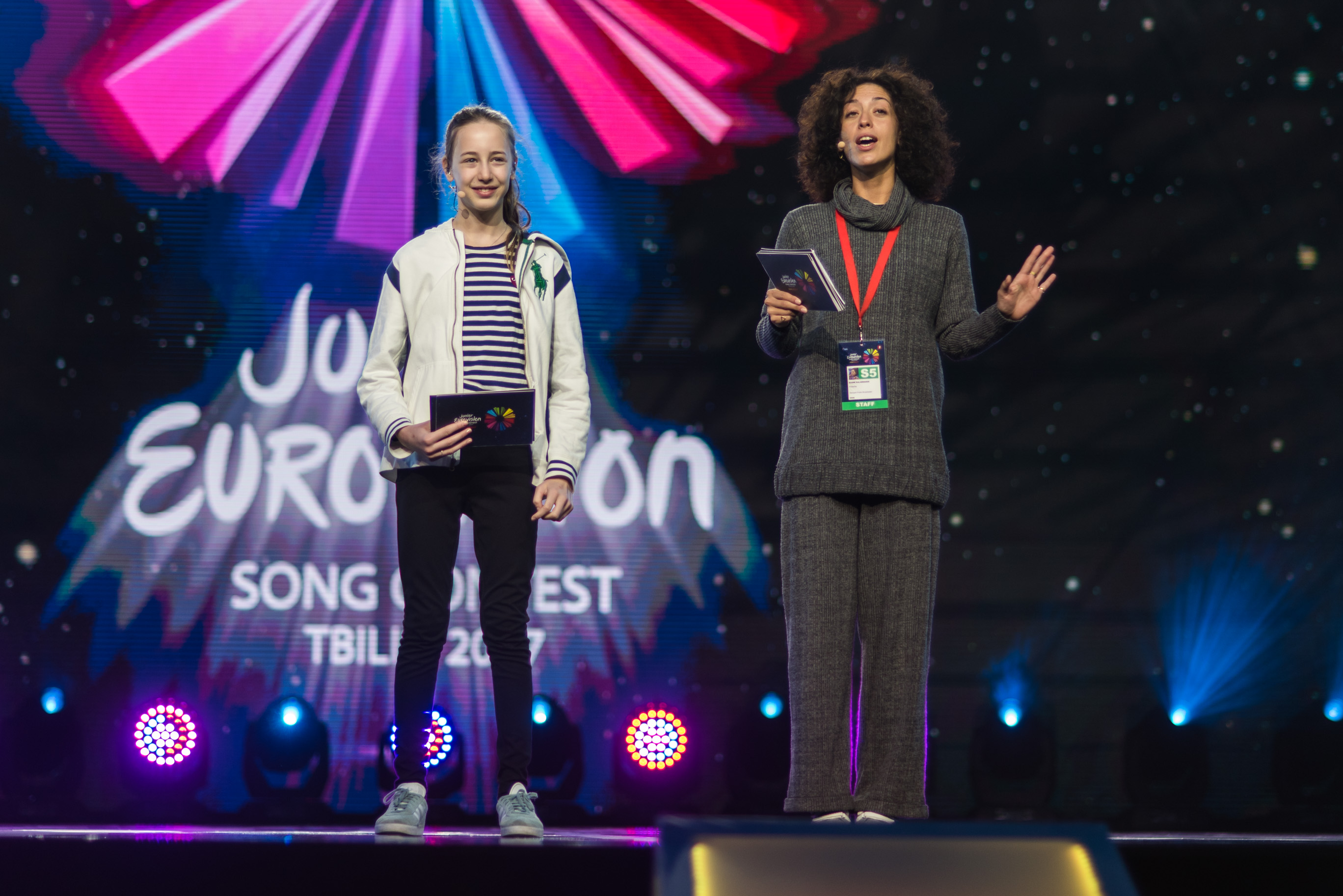
2017 hosts: Lizi Japaridze and Helen Kalandadze during a dress rehearsal

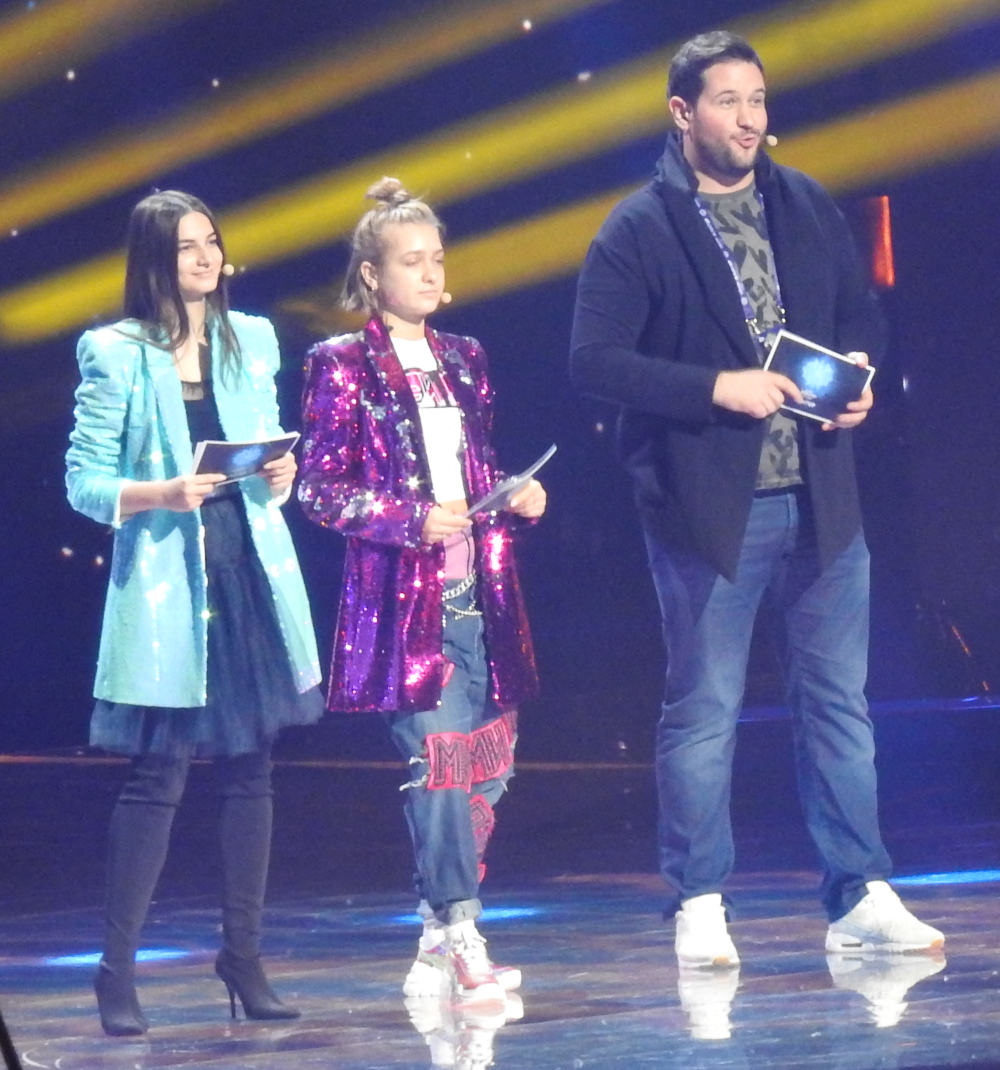
2018 hosts: Helena Meraai, Zinaida Kupriyanovich and Evgeny Perlin during a dress rehearsal

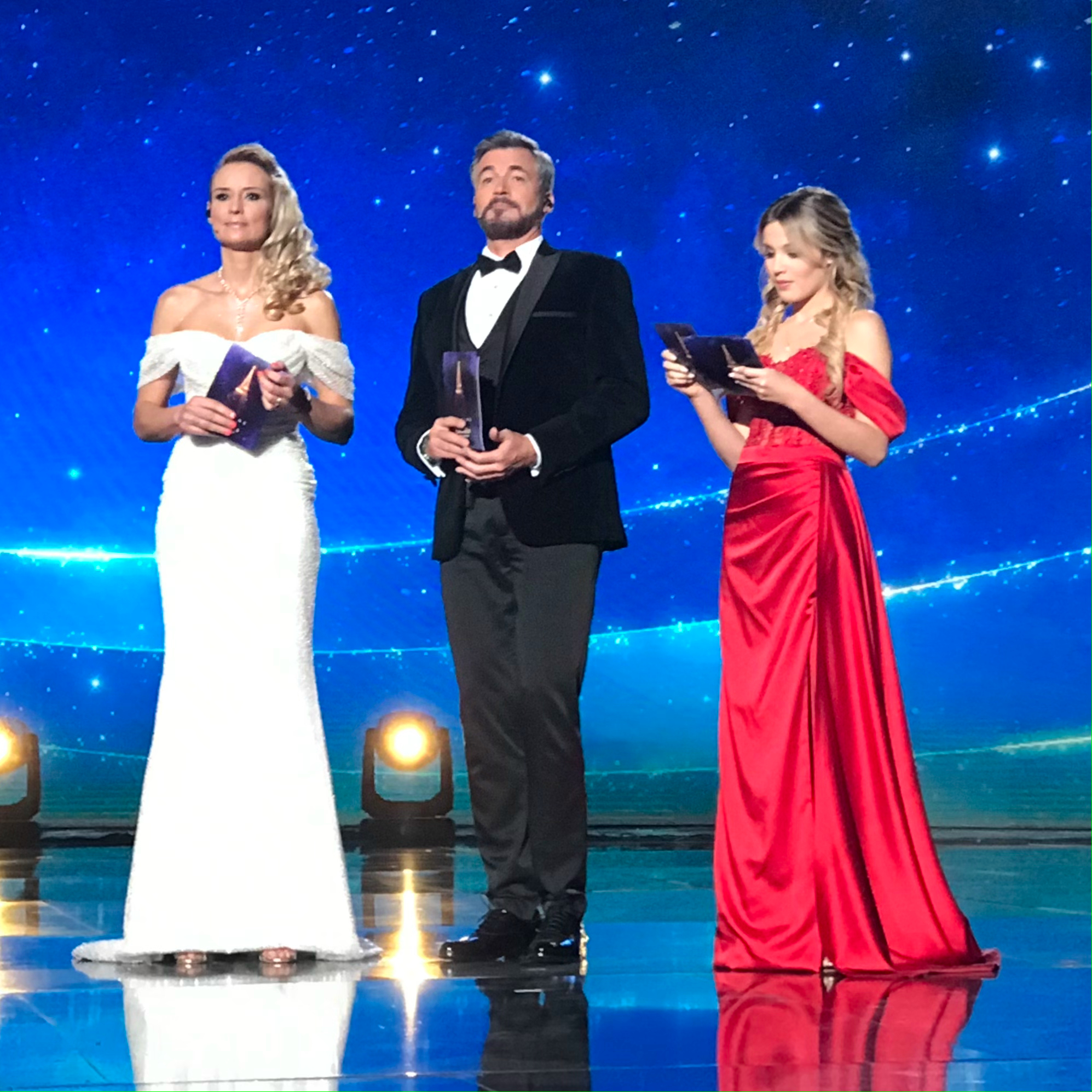
2021 hosts: Élodie Gossuin, Olivier Minne and Carla Lazzari at the contest

== See also ==
- List of Eurovision Song Contest presenters
