= VAL (band) =

Belarusian duo

- Also known as: Belarus
- Origin: Minsk
- Genres: Pop, indie, electronic
- Years active: 2016–present
- Label: VAL
- Members: Valeria Gribusova; Vladislav Pashkevich

VAL is a Belarusian band comprising Valeria Gribusova and Vladislav Pashkevich.

== History ==
In 2016, together with keyboardist and sound producer, Pashkevich, Gribusova founded a solo project called "VAL Music Project" which released the singles "Кто ты есть" (Who Are You) and "Ветер во сне" (Wind in a Dream) the same year.

VAL would have represented Belarus in the Eurovision Song Contest 2020 in Rotterdam with the song "Da vidna", after winning Belarus' national selection Natsionalniy Otbor 2020 on 28 February 2020; although it was canceled due to the COVID-19 pandemic.

The pair openly supported the 2020 Belarusian protests. Because of that, in September 2020, the Belarusian state broadcaster said the duo was no longer willing to represent Belarus in the Eurovision Song Contest.

== Members ==
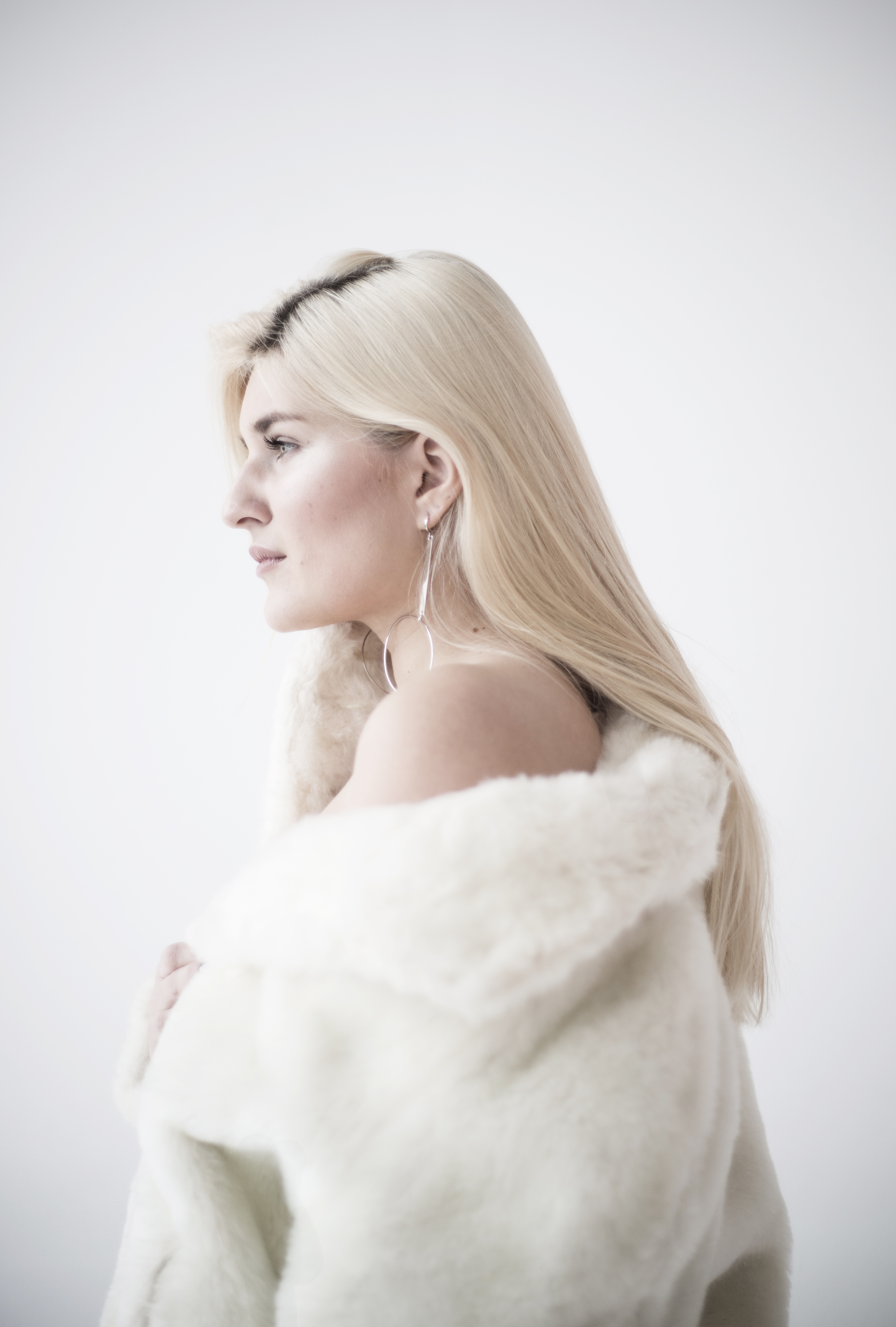
Valeria Gribusova (2017)

=== Valeria Gribusova ===
Valeria Gribusova (Belarusian: Валерыя Грыбусава, romanized: Valieryja Hrybusava; Mogilev, 12 February 1995) delivers most of the vocals for the duo and is a songwriter and a dancer.

Gribusova participated in Ludmila Zukova's children's ensemble Yaritsa from the age of five. She later attended the Mogilev Gymnasium where she matriculated with honours in choral music and art in 2013. She went on to study in the Pop Art department of the Belarusian State University of Culture and Arts. Gribusova worked as a soloist with the National Symphony Orchestra of Belarus under Mikhail Finberg in 2015.

Gribusova has won numerous accolades as a singer. In 2015, when she was 20 years old, she won first prize in the Belarus Slavianski Bazaar Competition. In 2017, she participated in the Ukrainian version of The Voice, joining Jamala's team.

=== Vladislav Pashkevich ===
Vladislav Pashkevich (Belarusian: Уладзіслаў Пашкевіч, romanized: Uladzislaŭ Paškievič) – alias Vlad Freimann (Влад Фрайманн) – is a music producer, songwriter, multi-instrumentalist and linguist. Pashkevich graduated at the Minsk State Linguistic University, and speaks four languages fluently: German, English, Russian and Belarusian. Pashkevich is of Jewish descent through his paternal grandfather Ernest Yefimovich Freimann.

Pashkevich is one half of the producing duo ToneTwins. Pashkevich was one of the backing singers for Naviband at the Belarusian national selection in 2017, but was not selected to be the group's backing singer at the Eurovision Song Contest 2017 in Kyiv.

== Discography ==
=== EPs ===
- 2017: В моей комнате (on ToneTwins Records)
- 2021: Пауза

==== Singles ====
- 2016: "Кто ты есть"
- 2016: "Ветер во сне"
- 2019: "Тихая гавань"
- 2020: "Да відна" ("Da vidna")
- 2020: "Частницы счастья"
- 2020: "Навечна"
- 2021: "Пауза"

Awards and achievements
Preceded by Zena with "Like It"	Belarus in the Eurovision Song Contest; 2020 (cancelled)	Succeeded by None
