= Alekseev (singer) =

Ukrainian singer and songwriter (born 1993)

Alekseev Алексєєв
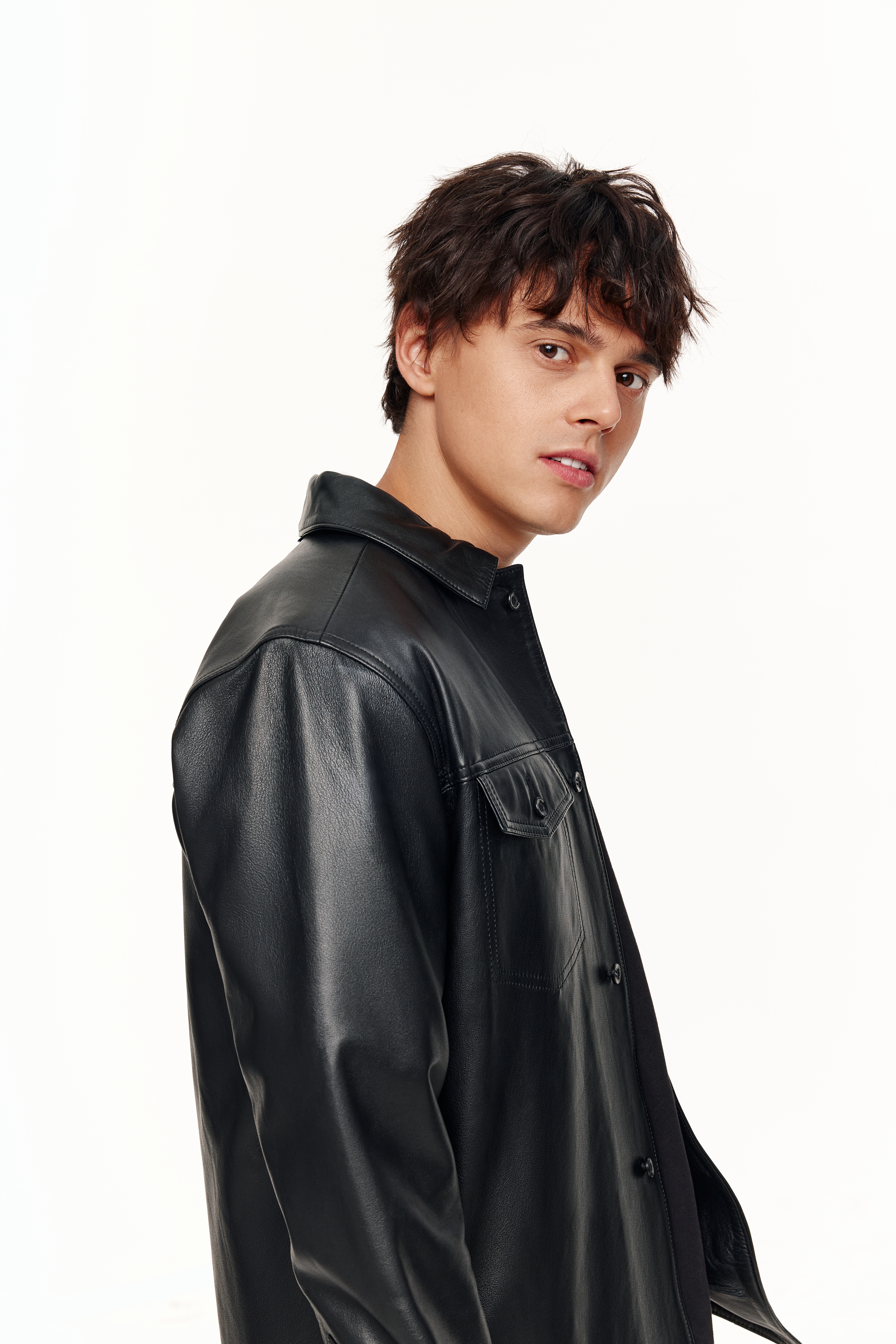
- Alekseev in 2022

Background information
- Born: Mykyta Volodymyrovych Alieksieiev; 18 May 1993 (age 33); Kyiv, Ukraine
- Genres: Pop; pop rock; deep house; alternative rock; indie pop; dance pop
- Occupations: Singer; songwriter; soundproducer
- Years active: 2014–present
- Label: Zion Music • Sony Music

Mykyta Volodymyrovych Alieksieiev (Note: Ukrainian: Микита Володимирович Алєксєєв; Russian: Никита Владимирович Алексеев, romanized: Nikita Vladimirovich Alekseyev; Belarusian: Мікіта Уладзіміравіч Аляксееў, romanized: Mikita Uladzimiravič Aliaksiejeŭ) (born 18 May 1993), better known by his mononym Alekseev, is a Ukrainian singer and songwriter. He first began his career in 2014 after making it to the semi finals on season four of The Voice of Ukraine. He subsequently released the single "Pyanoye solntse", which went on to become a number-one hit throughout the CIS and kickstarted his music career. He represented Belarus in the Eurovision Song Contest 2018 in Portugal with his song "Forever".

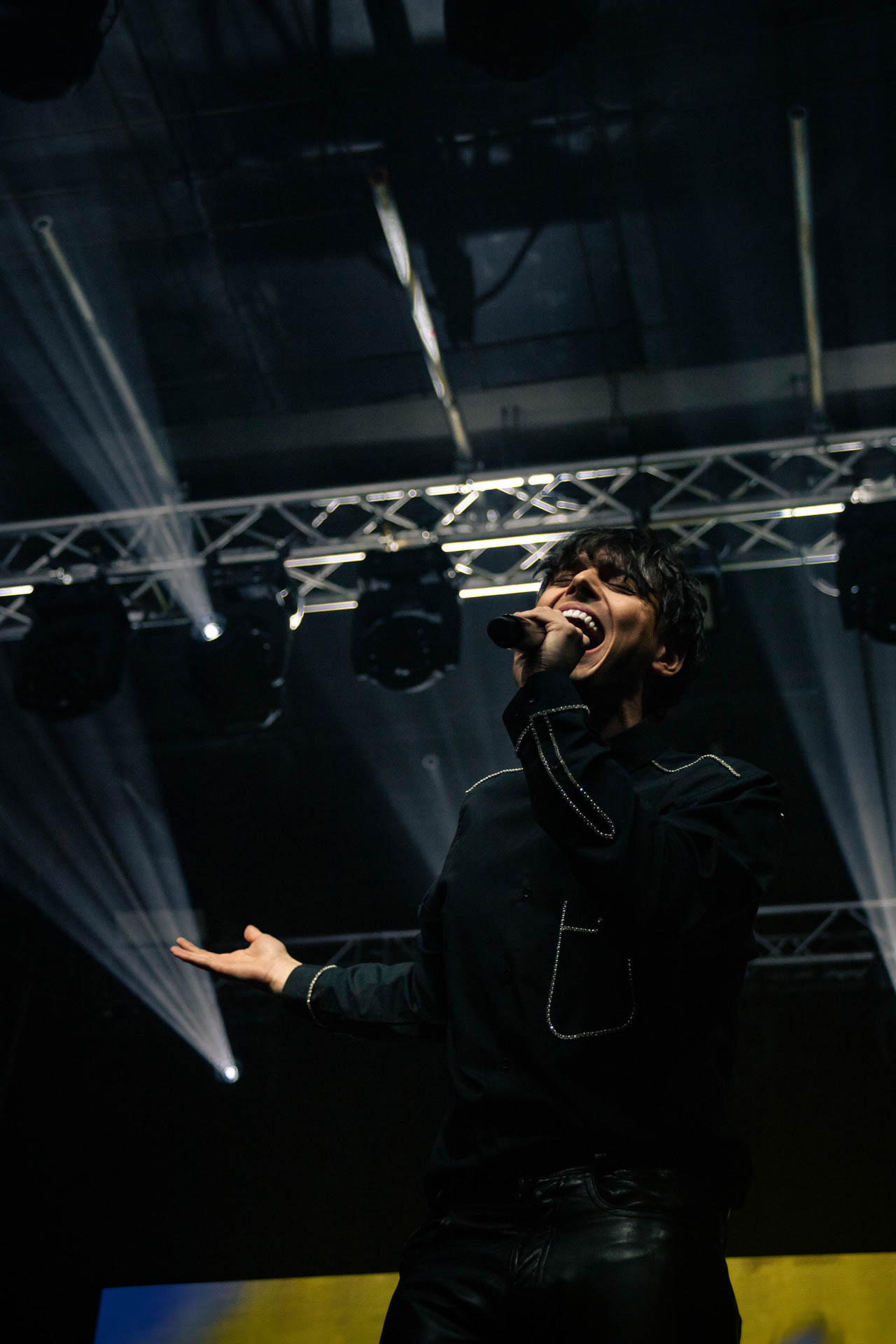
Alekseev Ukrsongproject 2022

== Early life ==
Alekseev was born on 18 May 1993 in Ukraine's capital of Kyiv from a mixed Ukrainian and Russian family, additionally being of Belarusian descent. Prior to his birth, his biological father left the family as he didn't want to become a parent and later moved to Israel. Alekseev remains estranged from him, but has spoken of his willingness to meet him.

When he was one and a half years old, Alekseev and his mother moved to her family in Chita, Russia, where they stayed for two years. Then, they returned to Kyiv, where Alekseev went to live in a small multiple household flat in the Livoberezhnyi Masyv. He enrolled in the local music school, where he, in 2005, tried to represent Ukraine in the Junior Eurovision Song Contest with a self-written song.

As a child, Alekseev spent several summers in Mula, Spain, where he lived with a Spanish foster family. At one stage, he lived there up to eight months a year. In 2018, during a pre-party for Eurovision, he met the family again for the first time in over a decade.

At the age of 12, Alekseev became very interested in music and singing and was taught by Konstantin Pona. He later started his own band called "Mova". He later graduated from the Kyiv National University of Trade and Economics with a degree in marketing.

Since 2018, he has been dating Ukrainian-Russian singer Ulyana Sinetskaya.

== Career ==
=== The Voice ===
During The Voice blind auditions, Ani Lorak turned her chair for Alekseev, but he did not go beyond the 1st live broadcast. As a consolation prize, Ani Lorak helped Alekseev shoot the music video for his debut single "Everything is in Time". But he did not gain popularity until after he appeared on Voice of the County: Reload where he covered Iryna Bilyk's "I'm Drowning" and shot a music video for it.

=== Debut – 2017 ===
In September 2015, Alekseev released Pyanoye solntse (Drunken Sun), with lyrics by Vitaly Kurovsky and music by Rusland Quint. The next month, a music video directed by Alan Badoev in which Alekseev kills his alter ego after breaking up with a girl, was shot. In late May 2016, he received the RU.TV award for best song. He also received a Yuna Award for "Drunken Sun". The subsequent singles, "Shards of Dreams", "Became Oceans" and "Feeling Soul", had their music videos also directed by Alan Badoev. On 29 June 2016, he performed the song at Miss Ukraine Universe 2016.

In June 2016, Alekseev won Breakthrough Artist of The Year at the Russian MUZ-TV Awards and Breakthrough Artist of The Year at the Ukrainian M1 Music Awards in December 2016. In March 2017, the artist won ZD Awards and Top Hit Music Awards in several categories: "Breakthrough Artist of The Year", "Artist of The Year", "Take-Off of The Year", "Most Frequently Played on The Radio" for the track Drunken Sun and "Most Popular Radio Artist".

On 14 February 2017, Alekseev started his first Ukrainian Tour. The final show took place on the artist's birthday, 18 May, at the Oktyabrsky Palace.

=== Eurovision Song Contest ===
One week after applying for the Ukrainian contest Vidbir, it was revealed that Alekseev had revoked his bid. It was then later revealed that he entered into Belarus' contest instead. There was controversy following Alekseev's entry. Eurovision rules state that the song performed is not allowed to have been performed before 1 September of the previous year. Alekseev, however, had been performing a Russian song named "Навсегда" at his concerts. He then shortened the song and translated the lyrics to English to get around this rule. On 15 January 2018, an article emerged claiming that 11 other finalists in the Belarus contest were threatening to withdraw if Alekseev was allowed to qualify for the contests' final.

However, on 16 February 2018, Alekseev won the Belarus National Selection and represented the country at the 2018 Eurovision Song Contest in Lisbon, Portugal.

=== After Eurovision Song Contest ===
In November 2018, it became known that the artist began to cooperate with Sony Music Entertainment (Russia).

In 2022, he was banned from Russia alongside countless Ukrainian music artists.

== Discography ==
=== Studio albums ===
Title	Details
Пьяное солнце Drunken Sun	Release Date: 2 December 2016; Label: Zion Music; Format: Digital distribution
МОЯ ЗВЕЗДА My Star	Release Date: 23 May 2019; Label: Sony Music; Format: Digital distribution

=== EPs ===
Title	Details
Держи Hold	Release Date: 25 February 2017; Label: Zion Music; Format: Digital distribution
Forever	Release Date: 23 April 2018; Label: Sony Music; Format: Digital distribution

=== Singles ===
Title	Year	Peak chart positions		Album
Title	Year	RUS	UKR	Album
"Всё успеть" (Everything Is in Time)	2014	—	—	Hold
"Больно, как в раю" (It Hurts Like in Paradise)	2015	—	—	Drunken Sun
"А я плыву" (And I'm Swimming)	2015	59	1	Drunken Sun
"Пьяное солнце" (Drunken Sun)	2015	2	1	Drunken Sun
"Снов осколки" (Broken of the Dreams)	2016	37	13	Drunken Sun
"OMA"	2016	—	—	Drunken Sun
"Океанами стали" (Became Oceans)	2016	39	39	Drunken Sun
"Чувствую душой" (I Feel My Soul)	2017	29	—	Drunken Sun
"Навсегда" (Forever)	2017	29	—	Forever
"Forever"	2018	22	15	Forever
"Сберегу" (Saving)	2018	29	—	My Star
"Февраль" (February)	2018	495	—	Non-album single
"Как ты там" (How are you)	2018	29	—	My Star
"Не мёд" (No honey)	2019	29	—	My Star
Mama 2022

=== Music videos ===
Title	Year
"Всё успеть" (Everything Is in Time)	2014
"А я плыву" (And I'm Swimming)	2015
"Пьяное солнце" (Drunken Sun)	2015
"OMA"	2016
"Снов осколки" (Broken of the Dreams)	2016
"Океанами стали" (Became Oceans)	2016
"Чувствую душой" (I Feel My Soul)	2017
"Forever"
"Сберегу" (I'll save you)	2018

== Filmography ==
Year	Title	Ukrainian Title	Role
2017	Mom for Snow Maiden	Мама для Снігуроньки	Cameo

== Awards and nominations ==
Year	Award	Category	Result	Ref.
2016	YUNA Awards	Breakthrough of the Year	Won	
2016	MUZ-TV Awards	Breakthrough of the Year	Won	
2016	MUZ-TV Awards	Song of the Year for "Пьяное солнце" (Drunken Sun)	Nominated	
2016	RU.TV Awards	Song of the Year for "Пьяное солнце" (Drunken Sun)	Won	
2016	RU.TV Awards	Breakthrough of the Year	Nominated	
2016	Golden Gramophone Awards	For the Song "Пьяное солнце" (Drunken Sun)	Won	
2016	Top League Awards	Song of the Year for "Пьяное солнце" (Drunken Sun)	Won	
2016	M1 Music Awards	Breakthrough of the Year	Won	
2016	Song of the Year	For the Song "Снов Осколки" (Broken of the Dreams)	Won	
2016	Sound Track MK Awards	Breakthrough of the Year	Won	
2016	Sound Track MK Awards	Artist of the Year	Won	
2016	Top Hit Music Awards	Take-Off of the Year	Won	
2016	Top Hit Music Awards	Most Popular Radio Artist	Won	
2016	Top Hit Music Awards	Most Frequently Played Track on the Radio for the Song "Пьяное солнце" (Drunken Sun)	Won	
2016	OOPS! Video Awards	Best Music Video for "Пьяное солнце" (Drunken Sun)	Won	
2016	Russian National Music Awards	Best Pop Solo Artist of the Year	Nominated	
2016	Russian National Music Awards	Best Male Music Video for "Пьяное солнце" (Drunken Sun)	Nominated	
2017	MUZ-TV Awards	Best Male Music Video for "Океанами Cтали" (Became Oceans)	Nominated	
2017	Song of the Year	For the Song "Океанами Cтали" (Became Oceans)	Won	
2017	Song of the Year	Artist of the Year	Won	
2017	Top League Awards	For the Song "Океанами Cтали" (Became Oceans)	Won	
2017	Russian National Music Awards	Best Pop Solo Artist of the Year	Won	
2017	Award of the Magazine "OK!:"More than Stars»	«New Face. Music»	Won	
2017	Music Platform Awards	For the Song "Чувствую Душой" (I Feel My Soul)	Won	
2017	MUZ-TV Awards (Belarus)	Artist of the Year	Won	
2018	YUNA Awards	Album of the Year "Пьяное солнце" (Drunken Sun)	Nominated	
2018	ZHARA Music Awards	Best Singer of the Year	Nominated	
2018	RU.TV Awards	Best Fanclub	Nominated	
2018	RU.TV Awards	Best Singer of the Year	Nominated	
2018	Award of the Magazine "Viva!: "The most beautiful people"	"The Most Handsome Man of the Year"	Nominated	
2018	National TV-Award "High Five!"	«Favorite Singer»	Nominated	
2018	MUZ-TV Awards	Best Solo Artist of the Year	Nominated	
2018	International Music Festival "Astana Dausy-2018"(Kazakhstan)	Best Singer of Ukraine	Won	
2018	M1 Music Awards: 4 Seasons	Singer of the Spring	Nominated	
2018	M1 Music Awards: 4 Seasons	Singer of the Summer	Won	
2018	M1 Music Awards: 4 Seasons	Singer of the Year	Nominated	
2018	Top League Awards	For the Song "Навсегда" (Forever)	Won	
2018	Music Platform Awards	For the Song "Сберегу" (I'll Save You)	Won	
2019	Sound Track MK Awards	Best performer "Pop"	Won	
2019	Sound Track MK Awards	"Sexy M"	Won	
2019	ZHARA Music Awards	Best Singer of the Year	Nominated	
2019	Topical Style Awards	"Stylish single"	Won	
2019	MUZ-TV Awards	Best male music video for "Навсегда" (Forever)	Nominated	
2019	RU.TV Awards	Best Singer of the Year	Nominated	
2019	M1 Music Awards	Singer of the Year	Nominated	
2020	YUNA Awards	Best performer	Nominated	
2020	Music Platform Awards	For the Song "Ревность"(Jealousy)	Won	

== Notes ==
Awards and achievements
Preceded by Naviband with "Story of My Life"	Belarus in the Eurovision Song Contest; 2018	Succeeded by Zena with "Like It"
