= Helen Kalandadze =

Georgian television presenter and singer

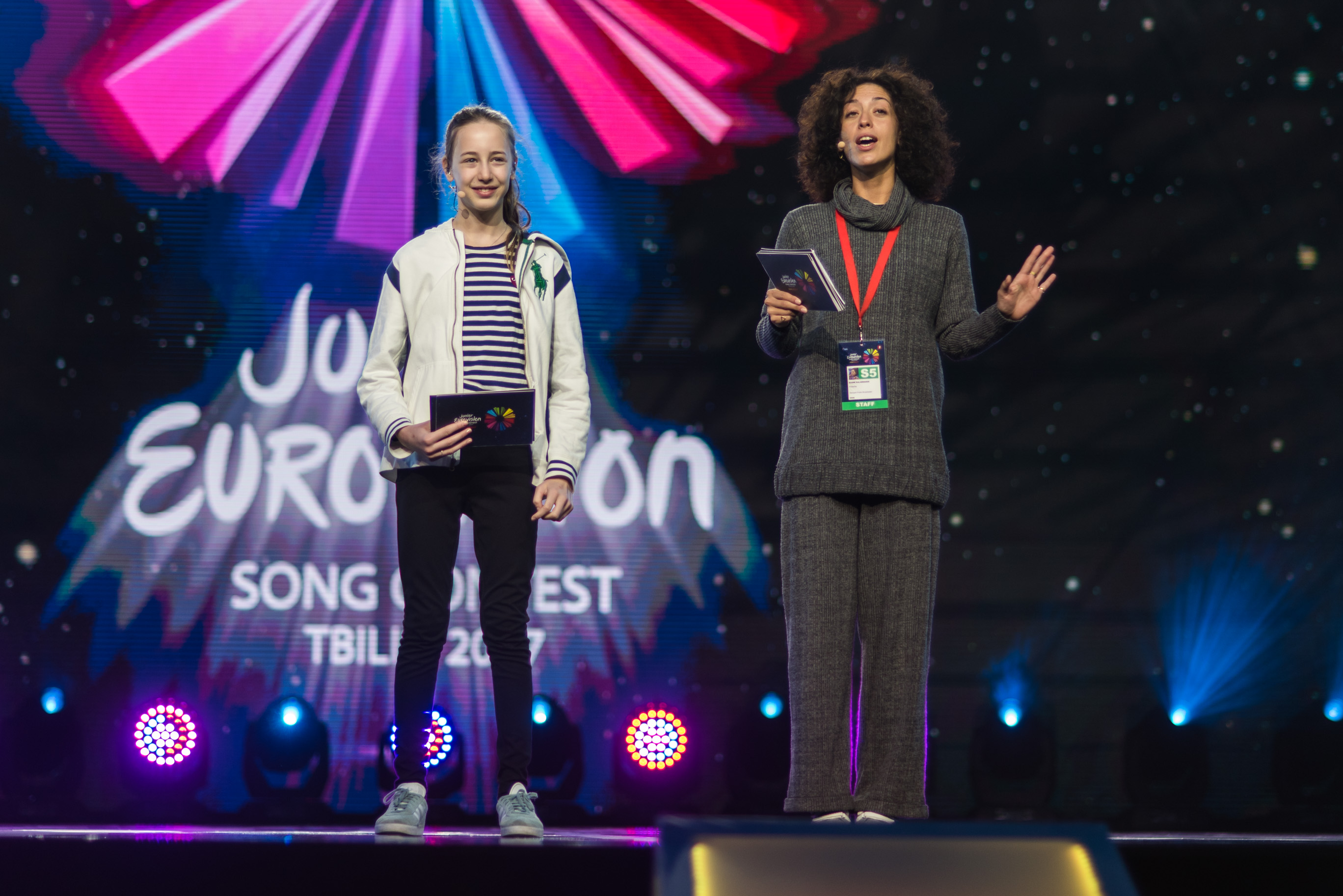
- Kalandadze (right) alongside Lizi Pop during dress rehearsal for Junior Eurovision 2017
- Born: Tbilisi, Georgia
- Education: Ilia State University
- Occupations: Television presenter; singer
- Years active: 2009–present

Helen Kalandadze (Georgian: ელენე კალანდაძე) is a Georgian television presenter and singer. She co-hosted the Junior Eurovision Song Contest 2017 in Tbilisi alongside Lizi Pop.

== Life and career ==
=== Early life ===
Kalandadze was born in Tbilisi. She attended secondary school in Woluwe-Saint-Pierre in Brussels, before returning to Georgia to attend Ilia State University. She graduated from the Faculty of Business Administration and Tourism Management in 2011.

=== Career ===
In 2009, Kalandadze participated in the Georgian version of Star Academy. She later began working in television presenting. In 2010, Kaladadze performed as a backing singer to Sofia Nizharadze at the Eurovision Song Contest 2010. Later, in 2013, she won the first season of Erti Ertshi, Georgia's version of Your Face Sounds Familiar. Kalandadze later moved to Israel, where she worked as a manager at a tourism company. In Israel, she resided in Rishon LeZion, and took part in HaKokhav HaBa L'Eurovizion 2017.

Kalandadze founded the organization Teen Club Studio with Sopho Toroshelidze and Nina Tsitlauri, which provides a space for teenagers to sing, play musical instruments, and receive vocal training. In October 2017, she was announced as one of the co-hosts of the Junior Eurovision Song Contest 2017, along with Lizi Pop.

In 2019 she was one of the Georgian commentators (alongside Gaga Abashidze and, only for the grand final, Nodiko Tatishvili) for the Eurovision Song Contest 2019, and in 2020 she commented the Junior Eurovision Song Contest 2020.

During the Grand Final of the Eurovision Song Contest 2022, she would have served as the spokesperson announcing the Georgian jury votes; however, due to alleged technical difficulties during the voting processes, they were instead announced by Martin Österdahl.

Preceded by (Malta) Ben Camille and Valerie Vella	Junior Eurovision Song Contest presenter 2017; With: Lizi Pop	Succeeded by (Belarus) Helena Meraai, Eugene Perlin and Zena
