= Forever (Alekseev song) =

2018 song by Alekseev

Single by Alekseev
- Released: 10 January 2018
- Genre: Pop
- Length: 3:08
- Label: Sony Music
- Songwriters: Kyrylo Pavlov; Evhen Matyushenko
- Producers: Kyrylo Pavlov; Evhen Matyushenko

Alekseev singles chronology
"Навсегда" (2017)	"Forever" (2018)	"Сберегу" (2018)

Music video
- "Forever" on YouTube

Eurovision Song Contest 2018 entry
- Country: Belarus
- Artist: Alekseev
- Language: English
- Composers: Kyrylo Pavlov; Evhen Matyushenko
- Lyricists: Kyrylo Pavlov; Evhen Matyushenko

Finals performance
- Semi-final result: 16th
- Semi-final points: 65

Entry chronology
- ◄ "Historyja majho žyccia" (2017)
- "Like It" (2019) ►

"Forever" is a song performed by Ukrainian singer Alekseev. It was originally released as "Navsegda" (Russian: Навсегда) on 10 November 2017. It represented Belarus in the Eurovision Song Contest 2018. The song was released as a digital download on 10 January 2018 through Zion Music.

== Eurovision Song Contest ==
The song competed in the first semi-final, held on 8 May 2018 in Lisbon, Portugal. It did not qualify for the grand final.

== Track listing ==
Digital download
No.	Title	Length
1.	"Forever" (Eurovision version)	3:08

== Charts ==
Chart (2018)	Peak position
Russia (Tophit) Russian version: "Navsegda"	22

== Release history ==
Region	Date	Format	Label
Various	10 January 2018	Digital download	Zion Music
