= Da vidna =

2020 song by VAL

Single by VAL
- Released: 27 January 2020
- Length: 2:55
- Songwriter(s): Mikita Najdzionaŭ

Eurovision Song Contest 2020 entry
- Country: Belarus
- Artist(s): VAL
- Language: Belarusian
- Composer(s): Uladzislaŭ Paškievič; Valeryja Hrybusava
- Lyricist(s): Mikita Najdzionaŭ

Finals performance
- Semi-final result: Contest cancelled

Entry chronology
- ◄ "Like It" (2019)

"Da vidna" (Belarusian: Да відна, English: Before dawn) is a song performed by Belarusian band VAL.

== Eurovision Song Contest ==
The song was to have represented Belarus in the Eurovision Song Contest 2020, after VAL was selected through the Belarus national selection. On 28 January 2020, a special allocation draw was held which placed each country into one of the two semi-finals, as well as which half of the show they would perform in. Belarus was placed into the first semi-final, to be held on 12 May 2020, and was scheduled to perform in the first half of the show.
