= Bzikebi =

Georgian musical group

Bzikebi ბზიკები
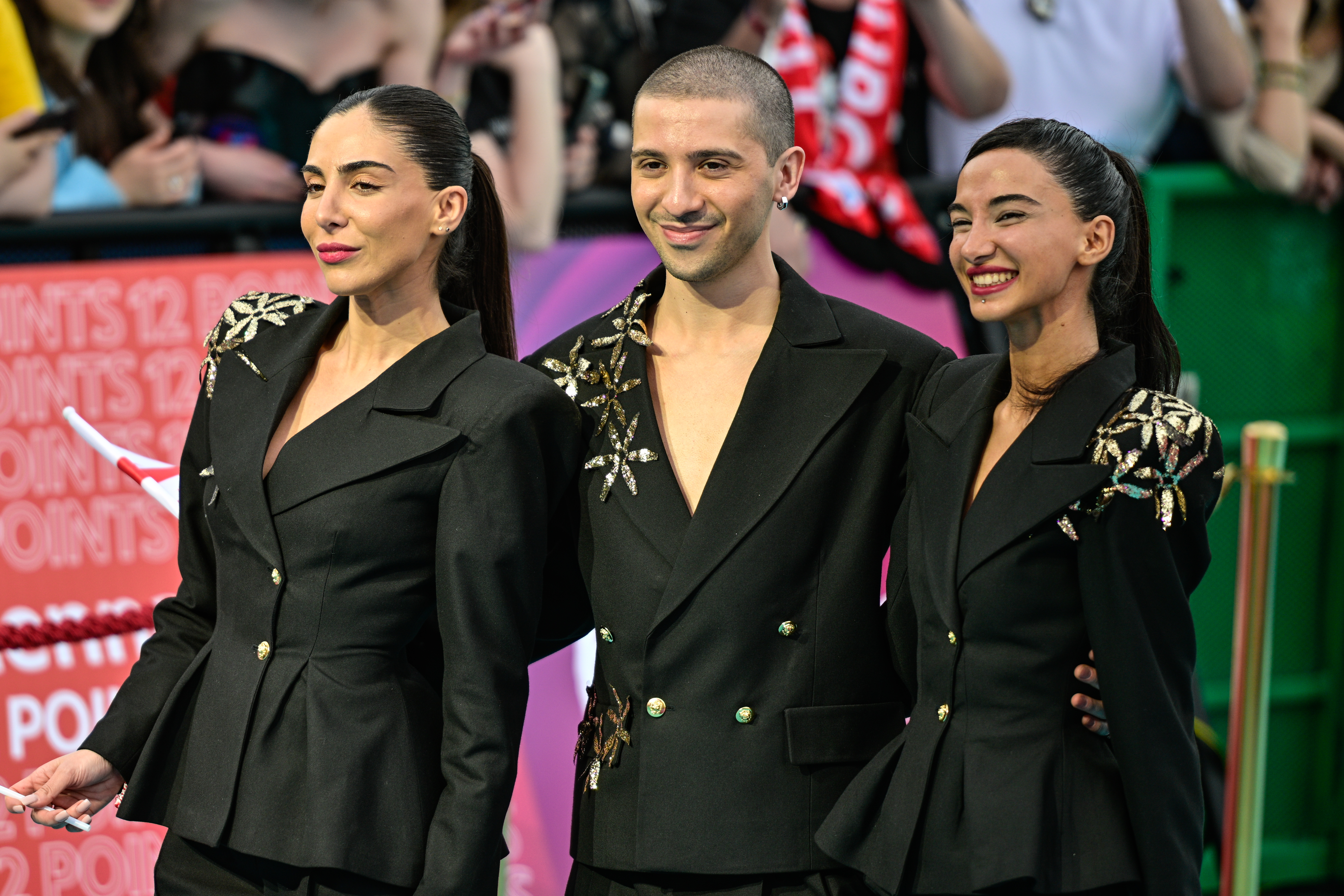
- Bzikebi in 2026

Background information
- Origin: Tbilisi, Georgia
- Genres: Children's music; pop
- Years active: 2008–present
- Members: Giorgi Shiolashvili; Mariam Kikuashvili; Mariam Tatulashvili

Bzikebi (Georgian: ბზიკები, lit. 'Little bees') is a Georgian musical group, best known for winning the Junior Eurovision Song Contest 2008 for Georgia with the song "Bzz...". The group consists of Giorgi Shiolashvili (გიორგი შიოლაშვილი, born 7 March 1998), Mariam Kikuashvili (მარიამ კიკუაშვილი, born 22 January 1998), and Mariam Tatulashvili (მარიამ თათულაშვილი, born 5 April 1998), who were all ten years old during the contest. They represented Georgia in the Eurovision Song Contest 2026 with the song "On Replay".

== Career ==
=== Junior Eurovision Song Contest 2008 ===
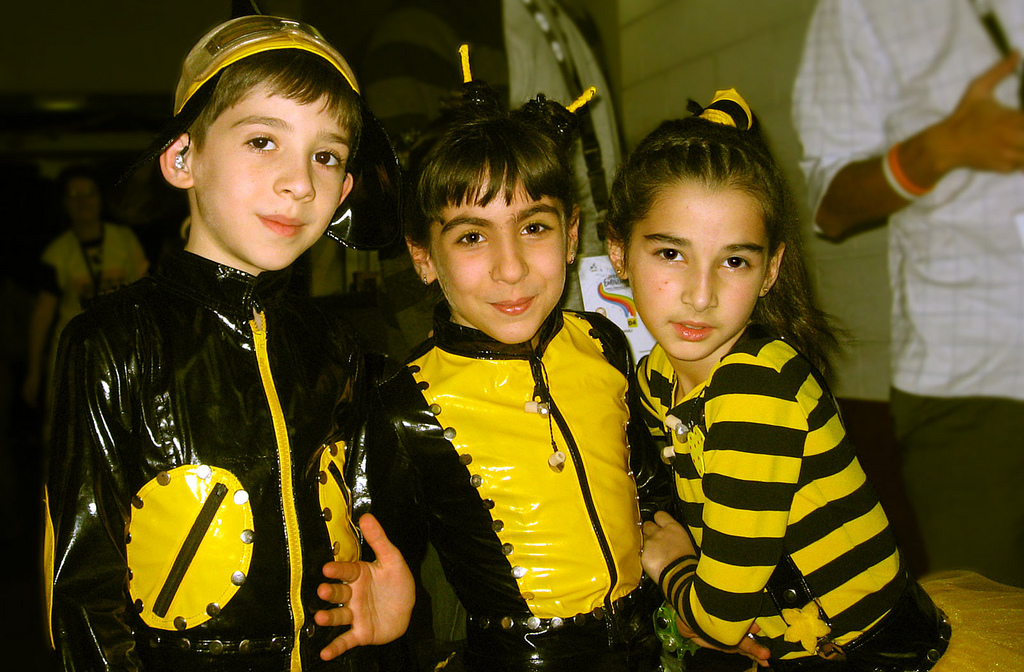
Bzikebi in 2008 (left to right: Shiolashvili, Tatulashvili, and Kikuashvili)

Bzikebi won the Junior Eurovision Song Contest 2008 in Lemesos, Cyprus on 22 November 2008 with their song "Bzz..". During their performance they were dressed in black and yellow outfits resembling bees and they sang in a made-up language. They won the competition with a total of 154 points.

The trio made frequent appearances at Junior Eurovision in the years following their win. In 2010, they appeared at the Interval Act where the seven previous winners of the contest reunited. The group also made a guest appearance during the voting segment at the 2011 contest. They also performed frequently in Georgia, before eventually going on hiatus as a group from 2012 onwards, until reappearing as guests at the opening ceremony of the 2017 contest on home soil, and in the 2022 contest as part of the 20th anniversary celebrations in Yerevan, and reissued two of their old songs, "Ave Maria" and "Zabuzei", on streaming services in 2023.

In 2025 the trio reunited again to perform their new song "We Don't Sleep" during an interval act at Junior Eurovision 2025. For the performance, the group adopted a black and white theme and invited the backup dancer of last year’s winner, Gabriel Machabeli, to perform.

=== Eurovision Song Contest 2026 ===
On the 14th of January 2026, Bzikebi were announced as Georgia's representatives in the Eurovision Song Contest 2026. Their song, "On Replay", was released on 11 March 2026. Bzikebi performed in the sixth position in the first half of the first semi-final of the 2026 contest in Vienna, Austria on 12 May 2026. They ultimately finished last out of 15 entries with five points, they failed to qualify for the final.

== Discography ==
Year	Song	Ref
2008	Bzzz	
2009	Ave Maria	
2009	Zabuzei	
2025	We Do Not Sleep	
2026	On Replay	

Awards and achievements
Preceded by Mariam Romelashvili with "Odelia Ranuni"	Georgia in the Junior Eurovision Song Contest; 2008	Succeeded by Princesses with "Lurji prinveli"
Preceded by (Belarus) Alexey Zhigalkovich with "S druz'yami"	Winner of the Junior Eurovision Song Contest; 2008	Succeeded by (Netherlands) Ralf Mackenbach with "Click Clack"
Preceded by Mariam Shengelia with "Freedom"	Georgia in the Eurovision Song Contest; 2026	Succeeded by Incumbent
