= Evgeny Perlin =

Belarusian journalist and television presenter

- Belarusian: Яўген Перлін
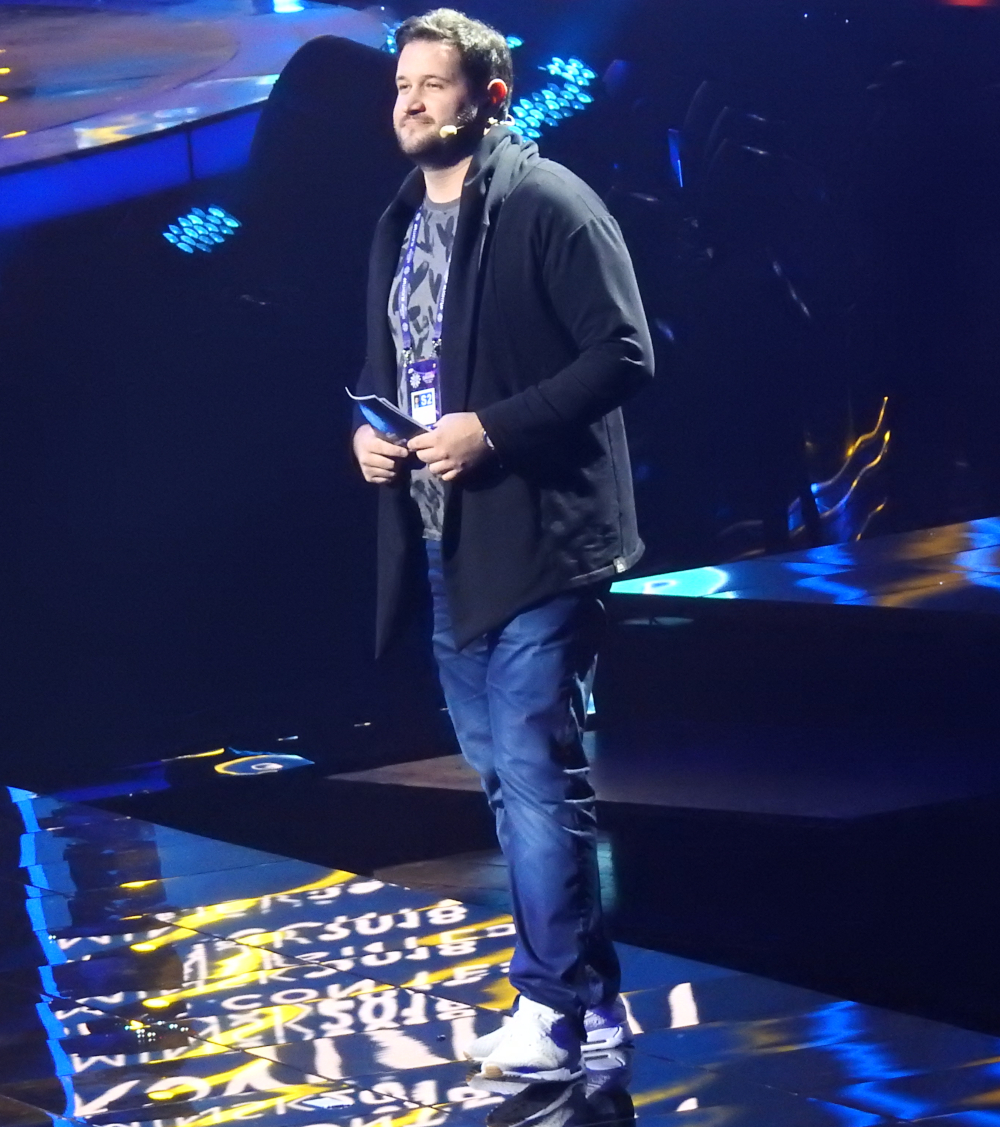
- Born: January 8, 1990 (age 36); Karma, Gomel Region, Belarus
- Other names: Yevgeny Perlin, Eugene Perlin
- Education: Belarusian State University
- Occupations: Showman, presenter, journalist
- Years active: 2007–present
- Employer: BTRC (2009-2020)
- Known for: Host of the late night show "Makayonka, 9"
- Notable work: Junior Eurovision Song Contest 2018 (presenter)

Evgeny Perlin (Belarusian: Яўген Перлін; Russian: Евгений Перлин - born in Karma, Gomel Region) is a Belarusian journalist and television presenter.

On 26 October 2018, it was announced that Perlin would host the Junior Eurovision Song Contest 2018, alongside singers Helena Meraai and Zinaida Kupriyanovich, in Minsk.

On 13 August 2020 he announced his resignation from the Belarusian state television (BTRC) amid the ongoing protests in the country.

Preceded by (Georgia (country)) Helen Kalandadze and Lizi Japaridze	Junior Eurovision Song Contest presenter 2018; With: Zinaida Kupriyanovich and Helena Meraai	Succeeded by (Poland) Ida Nowakowska, Aleksander Sikora and Roksana Węgiel
