= On Replay =

2026 song by Bzikebi

Single by Bzikebi
- Language: English
- Released: 12 March 2026
- Length: 3:07

Music video
- "On Replay" on YouTube

Eurovision Song Contest 2026 entry
- Country: Georgia
- Artist: Bzikebi
- Composer: George Kukhianidze
- Lyricist: Lizi Japaridze

Finals performance
- Semi-final result: 15th
- Semi-final points: 5

Entry chronology
- ◄ "Freedom" (2025)

"On Replay" is a song by Giga Kukhianidze with lyrics by Lisa Japaridze. The song was performed by the group Bzikebi and was Georgia's entry for the Eurovision Song Contest 2026 in Vienna.

== Background ==
The group Bzikebi previously won the Junior Eurovision Song Contest 2008. They were internally selected by Georgian Radio for their participation in the Eurovision Song Contest. The song was composed by Georgi Kukhianidze (also known as Giga Kukhianidze), who had also previously worked on the Junior Eurovision Song Contest. He mixed, mastered, and produced the song. The lyrics were written by Lisa Japaridze. The song is an uptempo English-language track. It begins with an intro consisting of vocalizations, followed by the first verse. The chorus, the title track, is "On Replay" and also features almost continuous vocalizations. The second verse differs from the first in both melody and length. After the second repetition of the chorus, a bridge follows, and finally, the chorus is repeated. The song was released on 12 March 2026. The music video was directed by Sasa Orashvili.

== Eurovision Song Contest ==
Georgia entered the 70th Eurovision Song Contest in May 2026 with this song. The country performed as number 6 in the first semi-final on 12 May, but did not qualify for the final.
