= Like It =

2019 song by Zinaida Kupriyanovich

Single by Zena
- Released: 26 March 2019
- Length: 3:01
- Songwriter(s): Yulia Kireeva
- Producer(s): Yulia Kireeva; Viktor Drobysh; Zinaida Kupriyanovich

Zena singles chronology
"Kosmos" (2016)	"Like It" (2019)

Eurovision Song Contest 2019 entry
- Country: Belarus
- Artist(s): ZENA
- Language: English
- Composer(s): Yulia Kireeva; Viktor Drobysh; Zinaida Kupriyanovich
- Lyricist(s): Yulia Kireeva

Finals performance
- Semi-final result: 10th
- Semi-final points: 122
- Final result: 24th
- Final points: 31

Entry chronology
- ◄ "Forever" (2018)
- "Da vidna" (2020) ►

"Like It" is a song performed by Belarusian singer Zena. It represented Belarus in the Eurovision Song Contest 2019. The song was performed during the first semi-final on 14 May 2019, and qualified for the final, where it finished in 24th place with 31 points.

== Eurovision Song Contest ==
The song represented Belarus in the Eurovision Song Contest 2019, after ZENA was selected through the Belarus national selection. On 28 January 2019, a special allocation draw was held which placed each country into one of the two semi-finals, as well as which half of the show they would perform in. Belarus was placed into the first semi-final, to be held on 14 May 2019, and was scheduled to perform in the first half of the show. Once all the competing songs for the 2019 contest had been released, the running order for the semi-finals was decided by the show's producers rather than through another draw, so that similar songs were not placed next to each other. Belarus performed in position 8. The song qualified for the final, where it finished in 24th place with 31 points.

== Charts ==
Chart (2019)	Peak position
Lithuania (AGATA)	72

== Track listing ==
Digital download
No.	Title	Length
1.	"Like It"	3:01
