= Georgia in the Eurovision Song Contest 2021 =

- Eurovision Song Contest 2021
- Participating broadcaster: Georgian Public Broadcaster (GPB)
- Country: Georgia
- Selection process: Internal selection
- Announcement date: Artist: 19 March 2020; Song: 15 March 2021

Competing entry
- Song: "You"
- Artist: Tornike Kipiani
- Songwriters: Tornike Kipiani

Placement
- Semi-final result: Failed to qualify (16th)

Participation chronology

Georgia was represented at the Eurovision Song Contest 2021 with the song "You" written and performed by Tornike Kipiani, who was internally selected in March 2020 by the Georgian broadcaster Georgian Public Broadcaster (GPB) to compete at the 2021 contest in Rotterdam, Netherlands after he was due to compete in the 2020 contest with "Take Me as I Am" before the event's cancellation. The Georgian entry, "You", was presented to the public on 15 March 2021.

Georgia was drawn to compete in the second semi-final of the Eurovision Song Contest which took place on 20 May 2021. Performing during the show in position 10, "You" was not announced among the top 10 entries of the second semi-final and therefore did not qualify to compete in the final. It was later revealed that Georgia placed sixteenth out of the 17 participating countries in the semi-final with 16 points.

== Background ==
Prior to the 2021 Contest, Georgia had participated in the Eurovision Song Contest thirteen times since their first entry in 2007. The nation's highest placing in the contest, to this point, has been ninth place, which was achieved on two occasions: in 2010 with the song "Shine" performed by Sofia Nizharadze and in 2011 with the song "One More Day" performed by Eldrine. The nation briefly withdrew from the contest in 2009 after the European Broadcasting Union (EBU) rejected the Georgian entry, "We Don't Wanna Put In", for perceived political references to Vladimir Putin who was the Russian Prime Minister at the time. The withdrawal and fallout was tied to tense relations between Georgia and then host country Russia, which stemmed from the 2008 Russo-Georgian War. Following the introduction of semi-finals, Georgia has, to this point, failed to qualify to the final on five occasions. In 2019, Georgia failed to qualify to the final with the song "Keep On Going" performed by Oto Nemsadze.

The Georgian national broadcaster, Georgian Public Broadcaster (GPB), broadcasts the event within Georgia and organises the selection process for the nation's entry. GPB confirmed their intentions to participate at the 2021 Eurovision Song Contest on 19 March 2020. Georgia has selected their entry for the Eurovision Song Contest both through national finals and internal selections in the past. In 2019 and 2020, the reality television show Georgian Idol was used to choose the artist, song or both. For their 2021 participation, GPB opted to internally select the Georgian entry.

== Before Eurovision ==
=== Internal selection ===
On 19 March 2020, the broadcaster announced that they had internally selected Tornike Kipiani to represent Georgia in Rotterdam. Kipiani worked with Georgian producer Aleko Berdzenishvili to record his song at the Bravo Records Studios in Tbilisi. The song "You", written and composed by Tornike Kipiani himself, premiered on 15 March 2021 together with the music video on the GPB First Channel programme Dghis kodi, hosted by David Aladashvili and Natalia Kutateladze. The music video was directed by Kipiani and Temo Kvirkvelia.

== At Eurovision ==
According to Eurovision rules, all nations with the exceptions of the host country and the "Big Five" (France, Germany, Italy, Spain and the United Kingdom) are required to qualify from one of two semi-finals in order to compete in the final; the top ten countries from each semi-final progress to the final. The European Broadcasting Union (EBU) split up the competing countries into six different pots based on voting patterns from previous contests, with countries with favourable voting histories put into the same pot. For the 2021 contest, the semi-final allocation draw held for 2020 which was held on 28 January 2020, was used. Georgia was placed into the second semi-final, which was held on 20 May 2021, and was scheduled to perform in the second half of the show.

Once all the competing songs for the 2021 contest had been released, the running order for the semi-finals was decided by the shows' producers rather than through another draw, so that similar songs were not placed next to each other. Georgia was set to perform in position 10, following the entry from Serbia and before the entry from Albania.

The two semi-finals and the final were broadcast in Georgia on GPB First Channel with commentary by Nika Lobiladze. The Georgian spokesperson, who announced the top 12-point score awarded by the Georgian jury during the final, was 2019 Georgian Eurovision entrant Oto Nemsadze.

=== Semi-final ===
Georgia performed tenth in the second semi-final, following the entry from Serbia and preceding the entry from Albania. At the end of the show, Georgia was not announced among the top 10 entries in the second semi-final and therefore failed to qualify to compete in the final. It was later revealed that Georgia placed sixteenth in the semi-final, receiving a total of 16 points: 15 points from the televoting and 1 point from the juries.

=== Voting ===
Voting during the three shows involved each country awarding two sets of points from 1-8, 10 and 12: one from their professional jury and the other from televoting. Each nation's jury consisted of five music industry professionals who are citizens of the country they represent, with a diversity in gender and age represented. The judges assess each entry based on the performances during the second Dress Rehearsal of each show, which takes place the night before each live show, against a set of criteria including: vocal capacity; the stage performance; the song's composition and originality; and the overall impression by the act. Jury members may only take part in panel once every three years, and are obliged to confirm that they are not connected to any of the participating acts in a way that would impact their ability to vote impartially. Jury members should also vote independently, with no discussion of their vote permitted with other jury members. The exact composition of the professional jury, and the results of each country's jury and televoting were released after the grand final; the individual results from each jury member were also released in an anonymised form.

Below is a breakdown of points awarded to Georgia and awarded by Georgia in the second semi-final and grand final of the contest, and the breakdown of the jury voting and televoting conducted during the two shows:

==== Points awarded to Georgia ====
Points awarded to Georgia (Semi-final 2)
Score	Televote	Jury
12 points		
10 points		
8 points		
7 points		
6 points		
5 points		
4 points		
3 points	Estonia; Latvia; Portugal; Poland	
2 points	Bulgaria	
1 point	Denmark	Bulgaria

==== Points awarded by Georgia ====
Points awarded by Georgia (Semi-final 2)
Score	Televote	Jury
12 points	San Marino	Switzerland
10 points	Greece	Portugal
8 points	Bulgaria	Bulgaria
7 points	Iceland	Iceland
6 points	Finland	Czech Republic
5 points	Latvia	Austria
4 points	Denmark	Finland
3 points	Switzerland	Estonia
2 points	Albania	Serbia
1 point	Serbia	San Marino

Points awarded by Georgia (Final)
Score	Televote	Jury
12 points	Greece	Italy
10 points	Lithuania	Switzerland
8 points	Italy	Portugal
7 points	San Marino	Ukraine
6 points	Ukraine	Iceland
5 points	France	Azerbaijan
4 points	Russia	Bulgaria
3 points	Azerbaijan	Lithuania
2 points	Moldova	Netherlands
1 point	Iceland	Malta

==== Detailed voting results ====
The following members comprised the Georgian jury:

- David Evgenidze
- Helen Kalandadze
- Zaza Orashvili
- Nodiko Tatishvili
- Sopho Toroshelidze

Detailed voting results from Georgia (Semi-final 2)
R/O	Country	Jury							Televote	
R/O	Country	Juror A	Juror B	Juror C	Juror D	Juror E	Rank	Points	Rank	Points
01	San Marino	9	8	15	12	11	10	1	1	12
02	Estonia	10	9	6	8	8	8	3	12	
03	Czech Republic	5	4	7	7	5	5	6	14	
04	Greece	15	16	12	14	9	15		2	10
05	Austria	7	6	5	6	10	6	5	13	
06	Poland	14	13	9	15	12	14		15	
07	Moldova	13	12	16	9	13	13		16	
08	Iceland	4	3	4	3	4	4	7	4	7
09	Serbia	11	10	14	10	7	9	2	10	1
10	Georgia									
11	Albania	8	11	10	11	16	11		9	2
12	Portugal	2	2	1	1	2	2	10	11	
13	Bulgaria	3	5	2	4	3	3	8	3	8
14	Finland	6	7	11	5	6	7	4	5	6
15	Latvia	16	15	13	16	15	16		6	5
16	Switzerland	1	1	3	2	1	1	12	8	3
17	Denmark	12	14	8	13	14	12		7	4

Detailed voting results from Georgia (Final)
R/O	Country	Jury							Televote	
R/O	Country	Juror A	Juror B	Juror C	Juror D	Juror E	Rank	Points	Rank	Points
01	Cyprus	15	20	14	18	26	18		16	
02	Albania	19	23	19	22	23	23		22	
03	Israel	13	16	15	11	15	16		14	
04	Belgium	14	13	20	20	18	17		18	
05	Russia	25	26	16	26	17	21		7	4
06	Malta	12	10	9	7	16	10	1	12	
07	Portugal	5	4	1	6	3	3	8	21	
08	Serbia	20	22	21	23	20	24		25	
09	United Kingdom	22	17	26	25	19	22		26	
10	Greece	21	25	22	15	21	20		1	12
11	Switzerland	2	2	2	1	2	2	10	11	
12	Iceland	3	3	7	10	8	5	6	10	1
13	Spain	17	18	17	21	22	19		23	
14	Moldova	24	24	23	17	25	26		9	2
15	Germany	23	15	11	13	12	15		17	
16	Finland	11	9	25	9	13	12		15	
17	Bulgaria	7	7	4	12	4	7	4	13	
18	Lithuania	4	6	8	5	10	8	3	2	10
19	Ukraine	6	5	5	4	5	4	7	5	6
20	France	26	12	10	16	11	13		6	5
21	Azerbaijan	8	14	6	2	6	6	5	8	3
22	Norway	16	19	12	19	9	14		19	
23	Netherlands	9	8	18	14	7	9	2	24	
24	Italy	1	1	3	3	1	1	12	3	8
25	Sweden	10	11	13	8	14	11		20	
26	San Marino	18	21	24	24	24	25		4	7
