= Georgia in the Eurovision Song Contest 2020 =

- Eurovision Song Contest 2020
- Participating broadcaster: Georgian Public Broadcaster (GPB)
- Country: Georgia
- Selection process: Artist: Georgian Idol; Song: Internal selection
- Selection date: Artist: 31 December 2019; Song: 3 March 2020

Competing entry
- Song: "Take Me as I Am"
- Artist: Tornike Kipiani
- Songwriters: Tornike Kipiani

Placement
- Final result: Contest cancelled

Participation chronology

Georgia was set to be represented at the Eurovision Song Contest 2020 with the song "Take Me as I Am" written and performed by Tornike Kipiani, who was selected through the reality television show Georgian Idol, held by the Georgian broadcaster Georgian Public Broadcaster (GPB). The competition resulted in the selection of four finalists for the final on 31 December 2019. The results of a public vote exclusively resulted in the selection of Tornike Kipiani as the winner. The song that Tornike Kipiani would perform, "Take Me as I Am", was presented to the public on 3 March 2020.

Georgia was drawn to compete in the second semi-final of the Eurovision Song Contest which took place on 14 May 2020. However, the contest was cancelled due to the COVID-19 pandemic.

== Background ==
Prior to the 2020 Contest, Georgia had participated in the Eurovision Song Contest thirteen times since their first entry in 2007. The nation's highest placing in the contest, to this point, has been ninth place, which was achieved on two occasions: in 2010 with the song "Shine" performed by Sofia Nizharadze and in 2011 with the song "One More Day" performed by Eldrine. The nation briefly withdrew from the contest in 2009 after the European Broadcasting Union (EBU) rejected the Georgian entry, "We Don't Wanna Put In", for perceived political references to Vladimir Putin who was the Russian Prime Minister at the time. The withdrawal and fallout was tied to tense relations between Georgia and then host country Russia, which stemmed from the 2008 Russo-Georgian War. Following the introduction of semi-finals, Georgia has, to this point, failed to qualify to the final on five occasions. In 2019, Georgia failed to qualify to the final with the song "Keep On Going" performed by Oto Nemsadze.

The Georgian national broadcaster, Georgian Public Broadcaster (GPB), broadcasts the event within Georgia and organises the selection process for the nation's entry. GPB confirmed their intentions to participate at the 2020 Eurovision Song Contest on 9 June 2019. Georgia has selected their entry for the Eurovision Song Contest both through national finals and internal selections in the past. In 2019, the Georgian entry was selected via the reality television show Georgian Idol. For their 2020 participation, the artist was selected through Georgian Idol, while the song was selected internally by the broadcaster.

== Before Eurovision ==
=== Georgian Idol ===
The Georgian artist for the Eurovision Song Contest 2020 was selected through the ninth season of Georgian Idol, the Georgian version of the reality television singing competition format Idols created by Simon Fuller. The competition premiered on 26 October 2019 and concluded with a final on 31 December 2019. All shows in the competition were hosted by Ruska Makashvili with the live shows taking place at the Tbilisi Concert Hall in Tbilisi, broadcast on the GPB First Channel as well as online at the broadcaster's website 1tv.ge.

==== Judges ====
A four-member judging panel determined the contestants that would advance to the live shows and commented on the contestants' performances during the live shows. The judging panel consisted of:

- Tinatin Berdzenishvili – Director General of GPB and Head of EBU Gender Balance Initiative
- David Evgenidze – Songwriter and music producer of the GPB First Channel
- Natia Todua – Singer
- David Aladashvili – Pianist

==== Contestant progress in the live shows ====
Colour key

–	Contestant was in the bottom two
–	Contestant was in the bottom three
–	Contestant received the fewest public votes and was eliminated
–	Contestant received the most public votes

Contestant	Week 1	Week 2	Week 3	Week 4	Week 5	Week 6	Week 7
Tornike Kipiani	2nd 14.5%	1st 19.13%	1st 21.17%	1st 24.05%	1st 29.09%	1st 31.88%	1st 33.82%
Barbara Samkharadze	3rd 12.91%	3rd 12.11%	2nd 14.75%	2nd 15.15%	2nd 17.75%	2nd 22.42%	2nd 31.18%
Tamar Kakalashvili	1st 16.53%	2nd 15.71%	3rd 14.64%	4th 13.79%	4th 13.64%	3rd 16.20%	3rd 18.38%
Mariam Gogiberidze	6th 8.8%	6th 8.69%	7th 9.91%	3rd 14.06%	3rd 13.68%	4th 15.28%	4th 16.62%
Davit Rusadze	4th 11.91%	4th 10.23%	5th 10.01%	6th 10.79%	5th 13.01%	5th 14.22%	Eliminated (Week 6)
Mariam Shengelia	5th 10.31%	5th 8.72%	6th 9.98%	5th 12.26%	6th 12.83%	Eliminated (Week 5)	
Anri Guchmanidze	7th 8.64%	8th 8.64%	4th 10.01%	7th 9.90%	Eliminated (Week 4)		
Nika Kalandadze	9th 5.7%	7th 8.68%	8th 9.53%	Eliminated (Week 3)			
Liza Shengelia	8th 8.15%	9th 8.09%	Eliminated (Week 2)				
Merab Amzoevi	10th 2.55%	Eliminated (Week 1)					

==== Shows ====
===== Audition shows =====
GPB opened a public application from 26 July 2019 until 15 September 2019, with applicants attending preliminary auditions held in Tbilisi, Kutaisi and Batumi. Following the audition shows in front of the judging panel, aired between 26 October 2019 and 9 November 2019, 36 contestants were shortlisted and the judges selected the top ten contestants that would progress to the live shows, which were announced on 10 November 2019.

Auditions Show 1 – 26 October 2019
R/O	Artist	Song	Result
1	Erekle Turkadze	"Long Tall Sally"	Advanced
2	Sofi Dalas	"Highway to Hell"	—N/a
3	Barbara Samkharadze	"It's Raining Men"	Advanced
4	Dodo Goksadze	"Something's Got a Hold on Me"	Advanced
5	Nika Kalandadze	"Ocean Eyes"	Advanced
6	Beka Miruashvili	"Havana"	—N/a
7	Nini Shonia	"Never Enough"	—N/a
8	Tamar Kakalashvili	"Queen"	Advanced
9	Aleksandre Kitesashvili	"Sweet Home Chicago"	Advanced
10	Mariam Gogiberidze	"Misty"	Advanced

Auditions Show 2 – 2 November 2019
R/O	Artist	Song	Result
1	Giorgi Otiashvili	"The Girl from Ipanema"	—N/a
2	Mariam Giorgishvili	"Replay"	Advanced
3	Mariam Shengelia	"If I Were a Boy"	Advanced
4	Mariam Shvangiradze	"Million Reasons"	Advanced
5	Mariam Nozadze	"Do It like a Dude"	—N/a
6	Sirens	"Lady Marmalade"	Advanced
7	Albina	"You Sent Me Flying"	Advanced
8	Sukhan Devadze	"Me mzes vat'an" (მე მზეს ვატან)	Advanced
9	Tornike Kipiani	"House of the Rising Sun"	Advanced

Auditions Show 3 – 9 November 2019
R/O	Artist	Song	Result
1	Irakli Bitsadze	"Feeling Good"	Advanced
2	Merab Amzoevi	"Skin"	Advanced
3	Archil Gvasalia	"Vagiorkoma" (ვაგიორქომა)	Advanced
4	Mako Maisuradze	"I'd Rather Go Blind"	Advanced
5	Liza Sengelia	"Dream a Little Dream of Me"	Advanced
6	Anri Guchmanidze	"I've Got News for You"	Advanced

===== Live shows =====
One contestant was eliminated during each of the first six live shows between 16 November 2019 and 21 December 2019. The results of the live shows were determined exclusively by a public vote through televoting and voting via Facebook messenger.

Show 1 – 16 November 2019
R/O	Artist	Song	Televote	Place
1	Mariam Shengelia	"Alive"	10.31%	5
2	Barbara Samkharadze	"You Don't Own Me"	12.91%	3
3	Merab Amzoevi	"Skyfall"	2.55%	10
4	Davit Rusadze	"Atlas"	11.91%	4
5	Tamar Kakalashvili	"Golden Slumbers"	16.53%	1
5	Tamar Kakalashvili	"Carry That Weight"	16.53%	1
6	Tornike Kipiani	"Smells Like Teen Spirit"	14.5%	2
7	Nika Kalandadze	"Video Games"	5.7%	9
8	Anri Guchmanidze	"Thirty Seconds to Mars"	8.64%	7
9	Liza Sengelia	"Read All About It"	8.15%	8
10	Mariam Gogiberidze	"My Funny Valentine"	8.8%	6

Show 2 – 23 November 2019
R/O	Artist	Song	Televote	Place
1	Anri Guchmanidze	"Heaven on Their Minds"	8.64%	8
2	Barbara Samkharadze	"When You're Good to Mama"	12.11%	3
3	Mariam Gogiberidze	"I Am Changing"	8.69%	6
4	Mariam Shengelia	"Show Me How You Burlesque"	8.72%	5
5	Nika Kalandadze	"Don't Cry for Me Argentina"	8.68%	7
6	Tornike Kipiani	"Rock'n'Roll Queen"	19.13%	1
7	Liza Sengelia	"Moon River"	8.09%	9
8	Tamar Kakalashvili	"All That Jazz"	15.71%	2
9	Davit Rusadze	"Falling Slowly"	10.23%	4

Show 3 – 30 November 2019
R/O	Artist	Song	Televote	Place
1	Barbara Samkharadze	"Lale" (ლალე)	14.75%	2
2	Anri Guchmanidze	"Gamogiva khval" (გამოგივა ხვალ)	10.01%	4
3	Mariam Shengelia	"Mkholod benzvis" (მხოლოდ ბენზვის)	9.98%	6
4	Nika Kalandadze	"Kari k'vlav arnevs" (ქარი კვლავ არხევს)	9.53%	8
5	Mariam Gogiberidze	"Iminebs mze" (იმინებს მზე)	9.91%	7
6	Tornike Kipiani	"Artificial Love"	21.17%	1
7	Davit Rusadze	"Ar madzinebs" (არ მაძინებს)	10.01%	4
8	Tamar Kakalashvili	"Kuchashi ertkhel" (ქუჩაში ერთხელ)	14.64%	3

Show 4 – 7 December 2019
R/O	Artist	Song	Televote	Place
1	Barbara Samkharadze	"Jesus Christ Superstar"	15.15%	2
2	Davit Rusadze	"Any Dream Will Do"	10.79%	6
3	Tamar Kakalashvili	"As If We Never Said Goodbye"	13.79%	4
4	Anri Guchmanidze	"Close Every Door"	9.90%	7
5	Mariam Gogiberidze	"I Don't Know How to Love Him"	14.06%	3
6	Mariam Shengelia	"Memory"	12.26%	5
7	Tornike Kipiani	"Gethsemane"	24.05%	1

Show 5 – 14 December 2019
R/O	Artist	Song	Televote	Place
1	Davit Rusadze	"Q'viteli potlebi" (ყვითელი ფოთლები)	13.01%	5
2	Tamar Kakalashvili	"Nu medzakhi" (ნუ მეძახი)	13.64%	4
3	Mariam Shengelia	"King Lear"	12.83%	6
4	Barbara Samkharadze	"Ch'adosnuri hvertsni" (ჯადოსნური კვერცხი)	17.75%	2
5	Tornike Kipiani	"Is ak aris" (ის აქ არის)	29.09%	1
6	Mariam Gogiberidze	"Sevda" (სევდა)	13.68%	3

Show 6 – 21 December 2019
R/O	Artist	Song	Televote	Place
1	Barbara Samkharadze and Grigol Kipshidze	"Juice"	22.42%	2
2	Davit Rusadze and Giorgi Pruidze	"O (Fly On)"	14.22%	5
3	Tornike Kipiani and Liza Kalandadze	"Breathe"	31.88%	1
4	Mariam Gogiberidze and Giorgi Nakashidze	"Shallow"	15.28%	4
5	Tamar Kakalashvili and Oto Nemsadze	"Runaway Baby"	16.20%	3

==== Final ====
Each of the four remaining contestants performed during the final live show on 31 December 2019. The winner, Tornike Kipiani, was determined exclusively by a public vote through televoting and voting via Facebook messenger.

Final – 31 December 2019
R/O	Artist	Song	Televote	Place
1	Tamar Kakalashvili	"White Flag"	18.38%	3
2	Tornike Kipiani	"Love, Hate, Love"	33.82%	1
3	Mariam Gogiberidze	"Writing's on the Wall"	16.62%	4
4	Barbara Samkharadze	"This Is Me"	31.18%	2

=== Song selection ===
Tornike Kipiani's song was internally selected by a five-member expert commission consisting of Giorgi Asanishvili, Lana Kutateladze, Davit Evgenidze, Natia Mshvenieradze and Natia Uznadze. Kipiani worked with Georgian producer Aleko Berdzenishvili to record the selected song at the Bravo Records Studios in Tbilisi. The song "Take Me as I Am", written and composed by Tornike Kipiani himself, premiered on 3 March 2020 together with the music video on the GPB First Channel programme Akhali dghe, hosted by Helen Kalandadze. The music video was directed by Temo Kvirkvelia.

== At Eurovision ==
According to Eurovision rules, all nations with the exceptions of the host country and the "Big Five" (France, Germany, Italy, Spain and the United Kingdom) are required to qualify from one of two semi-finals in order to compete for the final; the top ten countries from each semi-final progress to the final. The European Broadcasting Union (EBU) split up the competing countries into six different pots based on voting patterns from previous contests, with countries with favourable voting histories put into the same pot. On 28 January 2020, a special allocation draw was held which placed each country into one of the two semi-finals, as well as which half of the show they would perform in. Georgia was placed into the second semi-final, which was to be held on 14 May 2020, and was scheduled to perform in the second half of the show. However, due to 2019-20 pandemic of Coronavirus, the contest was cancelled.

During the Eurovision Song Celebration YouTube broadcast in place of the semi-finals, it was revealed that Georgia was set to perform in position 16, following the entry from Portugal and before the entry from Bulgaria.
