= Georgia in the Eurovision Song Contest 2025 =

- Eurovision Song Contest 2025
- Participating broadcaster: Georgian Public Broadcaster (GPB)
- Country: Georgia
- Selection process: Internal selection
- Announcement date: 14 March 2025

Competing entry
- Song: "Freedom"
- Artist: Mariam Shengelia
- Songwriters: Buka Kartozia; Keti Gabisiani

Placement
- Semi-final result: Failed to qualify (15th)

Participation chronology

Georgia was represented at the Eurovision Song Contest 2025 with the song "Freedom", written by Buka Kartozia and Keti Gabisiani, and performed by Mariam Shengelia. The Georgian participating broadcaster, the Georgian Public Broadcaster (GPB), internally selected its entry for the contest.

Georgia was drawn to compete in the second semi-final, which took place on 15 May 2025. Performing during the show in position 10, Georgia was not announced among the top 10 entries of the second semi-final and therefore did not qualify to compete in the final. It was later revealed that Georgia placed 15th out of the 16 participating countries in the semi-final with 28 points.

== Background ==
Prior to the 2025 contest, the Georgian Public Broadcaster (GPB) had participated in the Eurovision Song Contest sixteen times since its first entry in 2007. Its highest placing in the contest, to this point, has been ninth place, which was achieved on two occasions: in 2010 with the song "Shine" performed by Sofia Nizharadze, and in 2011 with the song "One More Day" performed by Eldrine. GPB briefly withdrew from the contest in 2009 after the European Broadcasting Union (EBU) rejected its entry, "We Don't Wanna Put In", for perceived political references to Vladimir Putin who was the Russian Prime Minister at the time. The withdrawal and fallout was tied to tense relations between Georgia and then host country Russia, which stemmed from the 2008 Russo-Georgian War. Georgia has, to this point, qualified to the final on eight occasions. In 2024, the song "Firefighter" performed by Nutsa Buzaladze qualified to the final and was their first entry to do so since 2016; it ultimately placed 21st.

As part of its duties as participating broadcaster, GPB organises the selection of its entry in the Eurovision Song Contest and broadcasts the event in the country. GPB confirmed its intentions to participate at the 2025 contest on 2 September 2024. The broadcaster has selected its entry for the Eurovision Song Contest both through national finals and internal selections in the past. In 2024, GPB opted to internally select its entry, a method which was continued for its 2025 participation.

== Before Eurovision ==
=== Internal selection ===
On 14 March 2025, GPB announced "Freedom" performed by Mariam Shengelia as the Georgian entry for the Eurovision Song Contest 2025. Shengelia had previously attempted to represent Georgia in 2020, placing sixth in the ninth season of the reality television singing competition and artist selection Georgian Idol. "Freedom" was composed by Keti Gabisiani with lyrics by Buka Kartozia, and was selected from 18 applications received by GPB, with another 20 entries also sent in by foreign composers. The music video of the song was directed by Kakha Bukhrashvili with artistic direction by Shako Popiashvili and Nino Tsulaia, and premiered alongside the entry announcement via the official Eurovision Song Contest's YouTube channel.

== At Eurovision ==
=== Voting ===
==== Points awarded to Georgia ====
Points awarded to Georgia (Semi-final 2)
Points	Televote
12 points	
10 points	Armenia
8 points	
7 points	Israel
6 points	
5 points	Greece
4 points	
3 points	Latvia; Lithuania
2 points	
1 point	

Georgia failed to qualify to the Grand Final.

==== Points awarded by Georgia ====
Points awarded by Georgia (Semi-final 2)
Points	Televote
12 points	Armenia
10 points	Israel
8 points	Lithuania
7 points	Latvia
6 points	Austria
5 points	Greece
4 points	Finland
3 points	Czechia
2 points	Malta
1 point	Australia

Points awarded by Georgia (Final)
Points	Televote	Jury
12 points	Armenia	Italy
10 points	Ukraine	Denmark
8 points	Estonia	Latvia
7 points	Israel	Netherlands
6 points	Lithuania	Ukraine
5 points	Austria	Greece
4 points	Norway	Switzerland
3 points	Albania	Armenia
2 points	Germany	Germany
1 point	Sweden	Israel

==== Detailed voting results ====
Each participating broadcaster assembles a five-member jury panel consisting of music industry professionals who are citizens of the country they represent. Each jury, and individual jury member, is required to meet a strict set of criteria regarding professional background, as well as diversity in gender and age. No member of a national jury was permitted to be related in any way to any of the competing acts in such a way that they cannot vote impartially and independently. The individual rankings of each jury member as well as the nation's televoting results were released shortly after the grand final.

The following members comprised the Georgian jury:

- David Tsintsadze
- George Rostiashvili
- Shalva Popiashvili
- Ani Kekua
- Salome Bakuradze

Detailed voting results from Georgia (Semi-final 2)
R/O	Country	Televote	
R/O	Country	Rank	Points
01	Australia	10	1
02	Montenegro	15	
03	Ireland	13	
04	Latvia	4	7
05	Armenia	1	12
06	Austria	5	6
07	Greece	6	5
08	Lithuania	3	8
09	Malta	9	2
10	Georgia		
11	Denmark	11	
12	Czechia	8	3
13	Luxembourg	12	
14	Israel	2	10
15	Serbia	14	
16	Finland	7	4

Detailed voting results from Georgia (Final)
R/O	Country	Jury							Televote	
R/O	Country	Juror A	Juror B	Juror C	Juror D	Juror E	Rank	Points	Rank	Points
01	Norway	12	22	14	5	9	13		7	4
02	Luxembourg	26	25	25	20	21	26		23	
03	Estonia	8	16	8	6	23	12		3	8
04	Israel	10	14	12	3	10	10	1	4	7
05	Lithuania	22	24	18	16	20	22		5	6
06	Spain	14	15	20	15	19	20		22	
07	Ukraine	4	12	2	8	12	5	6	2	10
08	United Kingdom	21	10	19	18	22	19		26	
09	Austria	17	23	26	22	26	25		6	5
10	Iceland	20	7	23	11	16	15		20	
11	Latvia	5	3	10	7	2	3	8	12	
12	Netherlands	1	9	11	4	18	4	7	16	
13	Finland	24	21	22	19	17	24		11	
14	Italy	2	1	1	2	3	1	12	13	
15	Poland	13	17	21	14	7	14		15	
16	Germany	6	20	5	9	8	9	2	9	2
17	Greece	9	5	6	10	4	6	5	14	
18	Armenia	3	19	9	17	5	8	3	1	12
19	Switzerland	11	2	7	21	11	7	4	19	
20	Malta	15	11	13	25	13	18		17	
21	Portugal	23	6	3	23	14	11		21	
22	Denmark	7	4	4	1	1	2	10	24	
23	Sweden	19	18	17	26	6	17		10	1
24	France	18	8	15	12	15	16		18	
25	San Marino	16	13	16	24	24	21		25	
26	Albania	25	26	24	13	25	23		8	3
