= X Factor Georgia =

- Created by: Simon Cowell
- Presented by: Gega Palavandishvili (2014); Ia Sukhitashvili (2014); Giorgi Kifshidze (2015); Ruska Makashvili (2015-2018); Erekle Getsadze (2016); Vaniko Tarkhnishvili (2017-2018)
- Judges: Giorgi Gabunia (2014–2017); Tamta (2014–15, 2018); Sopho Toroshelidze (2014); Stephane Mgebrishvili (2014, 2017-2018); Sofia Nizharadze (2015-); Anri Jokhadze (2015, 2018); Nina Sublatti (2016); Nika Gvaramia (2016); Dato Porchkhidze (2016); Lela Tsurtsumia (2017); Naniko Khazaradze (2018); Dato Evgenidze (2018)
- Original language: Georgian
- No. of seasons: 5

Production
- Producers: MagtiCom, VTB Bank (Georgia)

Original release
- Network: Rustavi 2 (2014-2017); Imedi TV (2018)
- Release: 26 March 2014 – 2018

X Factor Georgia is the Georgian version of The X Factor, a show originating from the United Kingdom. It is a television music talent show featuring aspiring singers of all genres drawn from auditions held all across Georgia. The show was broadcast on Rustavi 2 channel in 2014. The categories are: Boys, Girls, Kids and Groups.

== Judges ==
In 2016, Nina Sublatti was added to the show's judging panel, as well as Dato Porchkhidze, following the departure of Tamta in 2015.

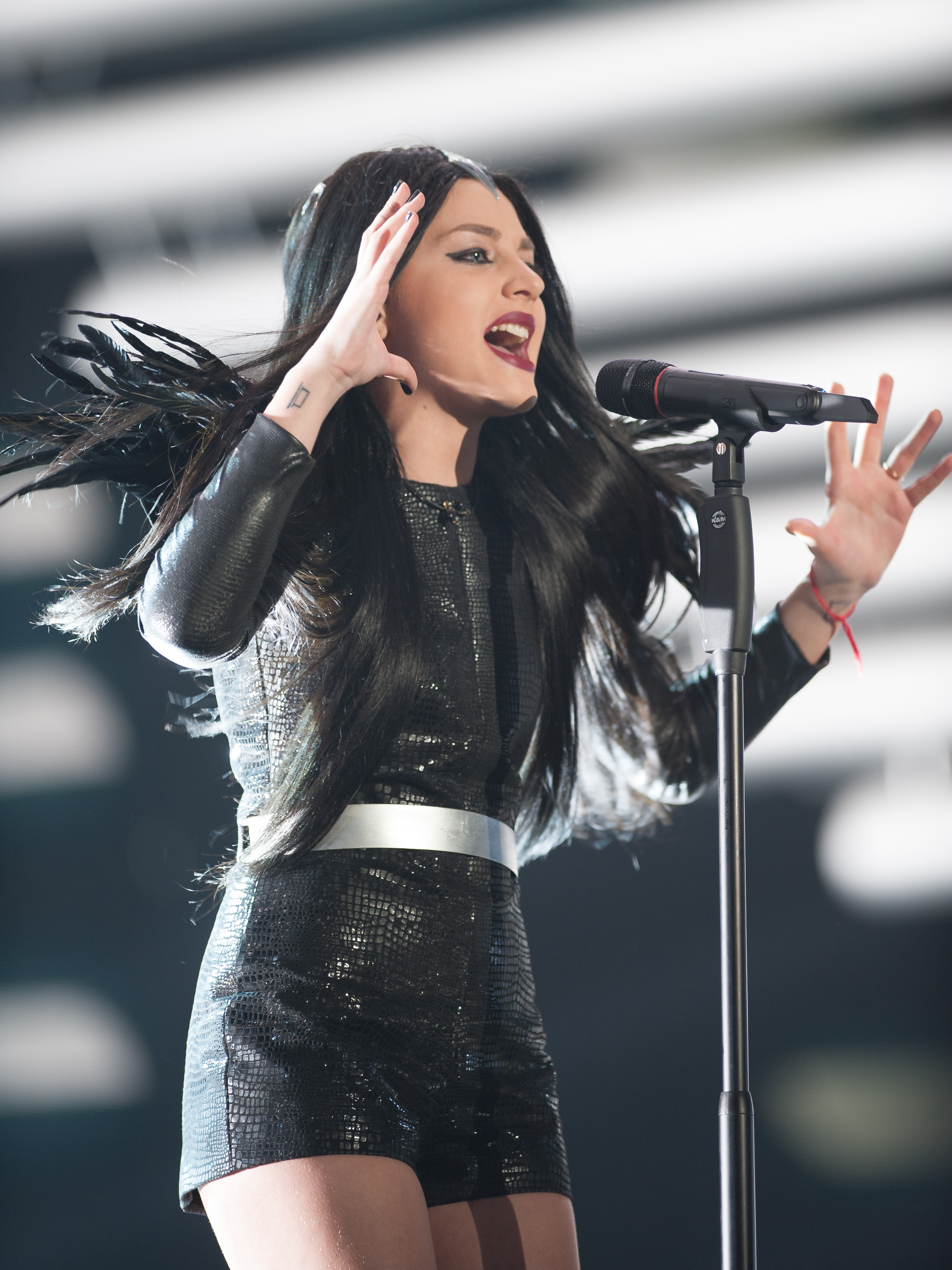
Sublatti joined the judging panel in 2016.

== Series Overview ==
- Act in Stephane's Category
- Act in Sopho's Category
- Act in Tamta's Category
- Act in Giorgi's Category
- Act in Anri's Category
- Act in Sofia's Category
- Act in Nika's Category
- Act in Dato P.'s Category
- Act in Nina's Category
- Act in Lela's Category
- Act in Naniko's Category
- Act in Dato E.'s Category

Season	Start	Finish	Winner	Other Finalists			Winning mentor	Host	Judges (seating order)				
1	2014	1 July 2014	Tornike Kipiani; Overs	Mebo Nutsubidze; Boys	Sparkle; Groups	—N/a	Tamta	Gega Palavandishvili la Sukhitashvili	Stephane	Sopho	Tamta	Giorgi	—N/a
2	2015	14 July 2015	Giorgi Nakashidze; Boys	Mariam Janjgava; Kids	Nini Bregvadze; Girls	—N/a	Giorgi Gabunia	Giorgi Kipshidze	Anri	Sofia	Tamta	Giorgi	—N/a
3	2016	6 July 2016	Avto Abeslamidze; Men	Cira Kobiashvili; Women	Dream Girls; Groups	Gigi Adamashvili; Boys	Nika Gvaramia	Ruska Makashvili; Erekle Getsadze	Nika	Dato P.	Nina	Sofia	Giorgi
4	2017	2017	Sandro Kurcxalidze; Men	Grigol Yifshidze; Kids	Mix2ra; Mixed	—N/a	Sofia Nizharadze	Ruska Makashvili; Vaniko Tarkhnishvili	Sofia	Stephane	Giorgi	Lela	—N/a
5	2018	14 July 2018	Anri Guchmanidze; Overs	Giorgi Futkarade; Boys	Goris Gogonata Gundi; Groups	Mariam Shengelia; Kids	Anri Jokhadze	Ruska Makashvili; Vaniko Tarkhnishvili	Stephane	Anri	Tamta	Naniko	Dato E.

== Contestants, categories and judges ==
Key:

– Winning judge/category. Winners are in bold, eliminated contestants in small font.

Series	Stephane Mgebrishvili	Sopo Toroshelidze	Tamta	Giorgi Gabunia	N/A
One	**Girls**; Sopho Saakashvili; Salome Tetiashvili; Maryam Kakhelishvili; Tamuna Shaverdashvili	**Groups**; Sparkle; Ake de Ana; 4's Age; Fancy Girls	**Overs**; **Tornike Kipiani**; Natia Tadiashvili; Sopho Tinikashvili; Levan Gvazava	**Boys**; Mebo Nutsubidze; Misho Eliava; Nika Kinadze; Giorgi Beridze	N/A
Two	Anri Jokhadze	Sofia Nizharadze	Tamta	Giorgi Gabunia	N/A
Two	**Kids**; Mariam Janjgava; Sopho Batilashvili; Giorgi Pruidze; Mariam Apkhadze	**Girls**; Nini Bregvadze; Tiko Mosemgdvlishvili; Linda Adamia; Mariam Ivardava	**Groups**; Dzmebi Gulashvilebi; The Pulse; Vanilla Cage; Natural Life	**Boys**; **Giorgi Nakashidze**; Dima Kobeshavidze; Rezi Kartsivadze; Guram Sakvarelidze	N/A
Three	Nika Gvaramia	Dato Porchkhidze	Nina Sublatti	Sofia Nizharadze	Giorgi Gabunia
Three	**Men**; **Avto Abeslamidze**; Misho Sulukhia	**Groups**; Dream Girls; X Boys	**Girls**; Nina Yifshidze; Teen Girls (band)	**Boys**; Gigi Adamashvili; Datuna Lazarishvili	**Women**; Cira Kobiashvili; Malibu Tugushi
Four	Sofia Nizharadze	Stephane Mgebrishvili	Giorgi Gabunia	Lela Tsurtsumia	N/A
Four	**Men**; **Sandro Kurcxalidze**; Mereb Amzoevi	**Mixed**; Mix2ra (band); Oto Gurwkaia	**Kids**; Grigol Yifshidze; Tamar Edilashvili	**Women**; Sofo Sajiniani; Magda Vasadze	N/A
Five	Stephane Mgebrishvili	Anri Jokhadze	Tamta	Naniko Khazaradze	Dato Evgenidze
Five	**Boys**; Giorgi Futkarade; Aleqsi Kikvidze	**Overs**; **Anri Guchmanidze**; Tamuna Giorgadze	**Girls**; Tamta Xuxunaishvili; Ia Tomashi	**Kids**; Mariam Shengelia; Likuna Tutisani	**Groups**; Goris Gogonata Gundi; Funky House

== First Season (2014) ==
=== Contestants ===
Key:

– Winner
– Runner-ups

Category (mentor)	Acts			
Girls (Stephane)	Sopho Saakashvili	Salome Tetiashvili	Maryam Kakhelishvili	Tamura Shaverdashvili
Groups (Sopho)	Sparkle	Ake de Ana	4's Age	Fancy Girls
Overs (Tamta)	Tornike Kipiani	Natia Tadiashvili	Sopho Tinikashvili	Levan Gvazava
Boys (Giorgi)	Mebo Nutsubidze	Misho Eliava	Nika Kinadze	Giorgi Beridze

=== Results summary ===
The number of votes received by each act was announced at the end of each week of transmission.

Colour key

–	Contestant received the most public votes
–	Contestant was in the bottom two or three, but was saved by their judge
–	Contestant was in the bottom two or three, but wasn't saved by their judge
–	Contestant was in the bottom two or three, but was immediately eliminated
–	Contestant was in the bottom two or three and had to face judges' decision

Weekly results per contestant
Contestant	Week 1				Week 2				Week 3	Week 4	Week 5	Week 6 Semi-Final		Week 7 Final
Contestant	Part 1	Part 2	Part 3	Part 4	Part 1	Part 2	Part 3	Part 4	Week 3	Week 4	Week 5	Part 1	Part 2	Week 7 Final
Tornike Kipiani	—N/a	1st 39,10%	—N/a	—N/a	—N/a	—N/a	2nd 31,50%	—N/a	7th 6,58%	1st 18,51%	2nd 18,64%	Safe	1st 32,30%	Winner
Sparkle	—N/a	—N/a	1st 35,30%	—N/a	1st 38,60%	—N/a	—N/a	—N/a	4th 14,17%	3rd 15,66%	1st 23,51%	Safe	2nd 25,60%	Runner-up
Mebo Nutsubidze	—N/a	—N/a	—N/a	1st 35,40%	—N/a	3rd 28,80%	—N/a	—N/a	1st 22,90%	4th 14,66%	5th 14,07%	Safe	3rd 22,90%	Runner-up
Sopho Saakashvili	4th 14,20%	—N/a	—N/a	—N/a	—N/a	—N/a	—N/a	2nd 29,00%	3rd 14,48%	7th 8,50%	3rd 16,41%	Saved	4th 19,30%	Eliminated (Week 6)
Misho Eliava	—N/a	—N/a	—N/a	3rd 17,70%	—N/a	1st 38,20%	—N/a	—N/a	5th 12,48%	2nd 17,38%	4th 14,56%	Eliminated	Eliminated (Week 6)	
Salome Tetiashvili	1st 45,00%	—N/a	—N/a	—N/a	—N/a	—N/a	—N/a	1st 45,80%	2nd 17,04%	5th 13,75%	6th 12,81%	Eliminated (Week 5)		
Ake de Ana	—N/a	—N/a	2nd 32,60%	—N/a	2nd 32,40%	—N/a	—N/a	—N/a	6th 8,43%	6th 11,54%	Eliminated (Week 4)			
Natia Tadiashvili	—N/a	2nd 29,20%	—N/a	—N/a	—N/a	—N/a	1st 42,30%	—N/a	8th 4,72%	Eliminated (Week 3)				
Maryam Kakhelishvili	2nd 23,40%	—N/a	—N/a	—N/a	—N/a	—N/a	—N/a	3rd 25,30%	Eliminated (Week 2)					
Sopho Tinikashvili	—N/a	3rd 21,70%	—N/a	—N/a	—N/a	—N/a	3rd 26,20%	—N/a	Eliminated (Week 2)					
Nika Kinadze	—N/a	—N/a	—N/a	2nd 34,90%	—N/a	2nd 33,00%	—N/a	—N/a	Eliminated (Week 2)					
4's Age	—N/a	—N/a	3rd 21,20%	—N/a	3rd 29,00%	—N/a	—N/a	—N/a	Eliminated (Week 2)					
Giorgi Beridze	—N/a	—N/a	—N/a	4th 12,10%	Eliminated (Week 1)									
Fancy Girls	—N/a	—N/a	4th 11,10%	—N/a	Eliminated (Week 1)									
Levan Gvazava	—N/a	4th 10,00%	—N/a	—N/a	Eliminated (Week 1)									
Tamuna Shaverdashvili	3rd 17,40%	—N/a	—N/a	—N/a	Eliminated (Week 1)									

Trivia

- Levan Gvazava took part in the first season of The Voice Georgia. He was part of team Nino Chkheidze and was eliminated during live shows.

== Second Season (2015) ==
=== Contestants ===
Key:

– Winner
– Runner-ups

Category (mentor)	Acts			
Kids (Anri)	Mariam Jangjava	Sopho Batilashvili	Giorgi Pruidze	Mariam Apkhadze
Girls (Sofia)	Nini Bregvadze	Tiko Mosemgdvlishvili	Linda Adamia	Mariam Ivardava
Groups (Tamta)	Dzmebi Gulashvilebi	The Pulse	Vanilla Cage	Natural Life
Boys (Giorgi)	Giorgi Nakashidze	Dima Kobeshavidze	Rezi Kartsivadze	Guram Sakvarelidze

=== Results summary ===
The number of votes received by each act was announced at the end of each week of transmission.

Colour key

–	Contestant received the most public votes
–	Contestant was in the bottom two or three, but was saved by their judge
–	Contestant was in the bottom two or three, but wasn't saved by their judge
–	Contestant was in the bottom two or three, but was immediately eliminated
–	Contestant was in the bottom two or three and had to face judges' decision

Weekly results per contestant
Contestant	Week 1		Week 2		Week 3	Week 4	Week 5	Week 6	Week 7	Week 8 Semi-Final	Week 9 Final
Contestant	Part 1	Part 2	Part 1	Part 2	Week 3	Week 4	Week 5	Week 6	Week 7	Week 8 Semi-Final	Week 9 Final
Giorgi Nakashidze	—N/a	Saved	—N/a	—N/a	1st 16,90%	1st	1st 16,74%	4th 9,57%	1st 20,15%	1st 27,00%	Winner
Nini Bregvadze	Saved	—N/a	—N/a	—N/a	6th 8,28%	Safe	5th 9,98%	1st 23,91%	3rd 14,00%	2nd 23,00%	Runner-up
Mariam Jangjava	—N/a	—N/a	Saved	—N/a	3rd 9,57%	Safe	6th 9,85%	7th 7,99%	4th 12,04%	6th 8,00%	Runner-up
Dzmebi Gulashvilebi	—N/a	—N/a	—N/a	Saved	7th 7,93%	Safe	7th 8,71%	2nd 16,44%	2nd 14,53%	3rd 16,00%	Eliminated (Week 8)
Sopho Batilashvili	—N/a	—N/a	Saved	—N/a	5th 8,54%	Safe	8th 7,50%	5th 9,18%	5th 11,15%	4th 14,00%	Eliminated (Week 8)
Tiko Mosemgdvlishvili	Saved	—N/a	—N/a	—N/a	4th 8,62%	Safe	4th 10,53%	3rd 15,22%	7th 10,13%	5th 11,00%	Eliminated (Week 8)
Giorgi Pruidze	—N/a	—N/a	Saved	—N/a	2nd 15,46%	Safe	2nd 14,47%	6th 8,84%	6th 11,14%	Eliminated (Week 7)	
Linda Adamia	Saved	—N/a	—N/a	—N/a	10th 4,61%	Saved	3rd 10,64%	8th 4,93%	8th 6,86%	Eliminated (Week 7)	
Dima Kobeshavidze	—N/a	Saved	—N/a	—N/a	8th 7,35%	Safe	9th 6,69%	9th 4,02%	Eliminated (Week 6)		
The Pulse	—N/a	—N/a	—N/a	Saved	11th 4,05%	Safe	10th 4,90%	Eliminated (Week 5)			
Violet Cage	—N/a	—N/a	—N/a	Saved	9th 4,82%	Eliminated	Eliminated (Week 4)				
Rezi Kartsivadze	—N/a	Saved	—N/a	—N/a	12th 3,86%	Eliminated (Week 3)					
Natural Life	—N/a	—N/a	—N/a	Eliminated	Eliminated (Week 2)						
Mariam Apkhadze	—N/a	—N/a	Eliminated	—N/a	Eliminated (Week 2)						
Guram Sakvarelidze	—N/a	Eliminated	Eliminated (Week 1)								
Mariam Ivardava	Eliminated	—N/a	Eliminated (Week 1)								

Trivia

- Nini Bregvadze took part in the first season of The Voice Georgia. She was part of team Dato Porchkhidze and was eliminated during live shows.
- Tiko Mosemgdvlishvili was a finalist in the second season of The Voice Georgia. She was part of team Maia Darsmelidze.

== Third Season (2016) ==
=== Contestants ===
Key:

– Winner
– Runner-ups

Category (mentor)	Acts	
Men (Nika)	Avto Abeslamidze	Misho Sulukhia
Groups (Dato P.)	Dream Girls	X Boys
Girls (Nina)	Nina Yifshidze	Teen Girls
Boys (Sofia)	Gigi Adamashvili	Datuna Lazarishvili
Women (Giorgi)	Cira Kobiashvili	Malibu Tugushi

=== Results summary ===
The number of votes received by each act was announced at the end of each week of transmission.

Colour key

–	Contestant received the most public votes
–	Contestant was in the bottom two or three, but was immediately eliminated
–	Contestant was in the bottom two or three and had to face judges' decision

Weekly results per contestant
Contestant	Week 1	Week 2	Week 3	Week 4	Week 5	Week 6 Semi-Final	Week 7 Final
Avto Abeslamidze	1st 21,75%	1st 15,45%	4th 13,28%	3rd 18,24%	3rd 18,75%	Safe	Winner
Gigi Adamashvili	6th 8,39%	6th 9,57%	2nd 14,95%	2nd 18,25%	1st 21,00%	1st	Runner-up
Cira Kobiashvili	5th 8,59%	8th 9,34%	1st 15,90%	4th 16,06%	4th 17,13%	Safe	Runner-up
Dream Girls	4th 9,98%	5th 10,37%	3rd 14,00%	5th 14,21%	2nd 19,72%	Saved	Runner-up
Datuna Lazarishvili	7th 7,52%	7th 9,35%	5th 11,87%	7th 5,17%	6th 10,36%	Eliminated	Eliminated (Week 6)
Misho Sulukhia	8th 7,38%	3rd 13,08%	6th 11,71%	1st 18,57%	5th 13,05%	Eliminated (Week 5)	
Nina Yifshidze	9th 6,25%	2nd 13,41%	7th 9,46%	6th 9,51%	Eliminated (Week 4)		
Malibu Tugushi	3rd 11,54%	4th 10,45%	8th 8,83%	Eliminated (Week 3)			
X Boys	2nd 14,23%	9th 9,03%	Eliminated (Week 2)				
Teen Girls	10th 4,36%	Eliminated (Week 1)					

== Fourth Season (2017) ==
=== Contestants ===
Key:

– Winner
– Runner-ups

Category (mentor)	Acts	
Men (Sofia)	Sandro Kurcxalidze	Mereb Amzoevi
Mixed (Stephane)	Mix2ra	Oto Gurwkaia
Kids (Giorgi)	Grigol Yifshidze	Tamar Edilashvili
Women (Lela)	Sofo Sajiniani	Magda Vasadze

=== Results summary ===
The number of votes received by each act was announced at the end of each week of transmission.

Colour key

–	Contestant received the most public votes
–	Contestant was immediately eliminated
–	Contestant was in the bottom two or three and had to face judges' decision

Weekly results per contestant
Contestant	Week 1	Week 2	Week 3	Week 4	Week 5 Semi-Final	Week 6 Final
Sandro Kurcxalidze	Safe	1st	1st	Safe	1st	Winner
Mix2ra	Safe	Safe	Saved	1st	Safe	Runner-up
Grigol Yifshidze	Safe	Safe	Safe	Safe	Saved	Runner-up
Tamar Edilashvili	1st	Safe	Safe	Saved	Eliminated	Eliminated (Week 5)
Sofo Sajiniani	Saved	Safe	Safe	Eliminated	Eliminated (Week 4)	
Magda Vasadze	Safe	Saved	Eliminated	Eliminated (Week 3)		
Mereb Amzoevi	Safe	Eliminated	Eliminated (Week 2)			
Oto Gurwkaia	Eliminated	Eliminated (Week 1)				

Trivia

- Magda Vasadze took part in the first season of The Voice Georgia. She was part of team Stephane Mgebrishvili & Maia Darsmelidze and was eliminated during live shows.

== Fifth Season (2018) ==
=== Contestants ===
Key:

– Winner
– Runner-ups

Category (mentor)	Acts	
Boys (Stephane)	Giorgi Futkarade	Aleqsi Kikvidze
Overs (Anri)	Anri Guchmanidze	Tamuna Giorgadze
Girls (Tamta)	Tamta Xuxunaishvili	Ia Tomashi
Kids (Naniko)	Mariam Shengelia	Likuna Tutisani
Groups (Dato E.)	Goris Gogonata Gundi	Funky House

=== Results summary ===
The number of votes received by each act was announced at the end of each week of transmission.

Colour key

–	Contestant received the most public votes
–	Contestant was in the bottom two or three, but was immediately eliminated
–	Contestant was in the bottom two or three and had to face judges' decision

Weekly results per contestant
Contestant	Week 1	Week 2	Week 3	Week 4	Week 5 Semi-Final	Week 6 Final
Anri Guchmanidze	7th 10,02%	Safe	Saved	Safe	Safe	Winner
Giorgi Futkarade	2nd 14,03%	Safe	1st	1st	Safe	Runner-up
Goris Gogonata Gundi	3rd/4th 11,14%	Safe	Safe	Safe	1st	Runner-up
Mariam Shengelia	1st 14,61%	Safe	Safe	Saved	Saved	Runner-up
Tamta Xuxunaishvili	8th 9,57%	Safe	Safe	Safe	Eliminated	Eliminated (Week 5)
Likuna Tutisani	6th 10,14%	Safe	Safe	Safe	Eliminated	Eliminated (Week 5)
Ia Tomashi	9th 6,88%	1st	Safe	Eliminated	Eliminated (Week 4)	
Aleqsi Kikvidze	3rd/4th 11,14%	Saved	Eliminated	Eliminated (Week 3)		
Tamuna Giorgadze	5th 10,52%	Eliminated	Eliminated (Week 2)			
Funky House	10th 1,94%	Eliminated (Week 1)				

Trivia

- Ia Tomashi took part in the first season of The Voice Georgia. She was part of team Nino Chkheidze and was eliminated during live shows.
- Mariam Shengelia will later take part in the fourth season of The Voice Georgia. She would be part of team Stephane Mgebrishvili and would be eliminated during live shows.
- Likuna Tutisani will later take part in the fifth season of The Voice Georgia. She would be part of team Stephane Mgebrishvili and would place third.
