= Mariam Shengelia =

Georgian singer (born 2002)

Mariam Shengelia მარიამ შენგელია
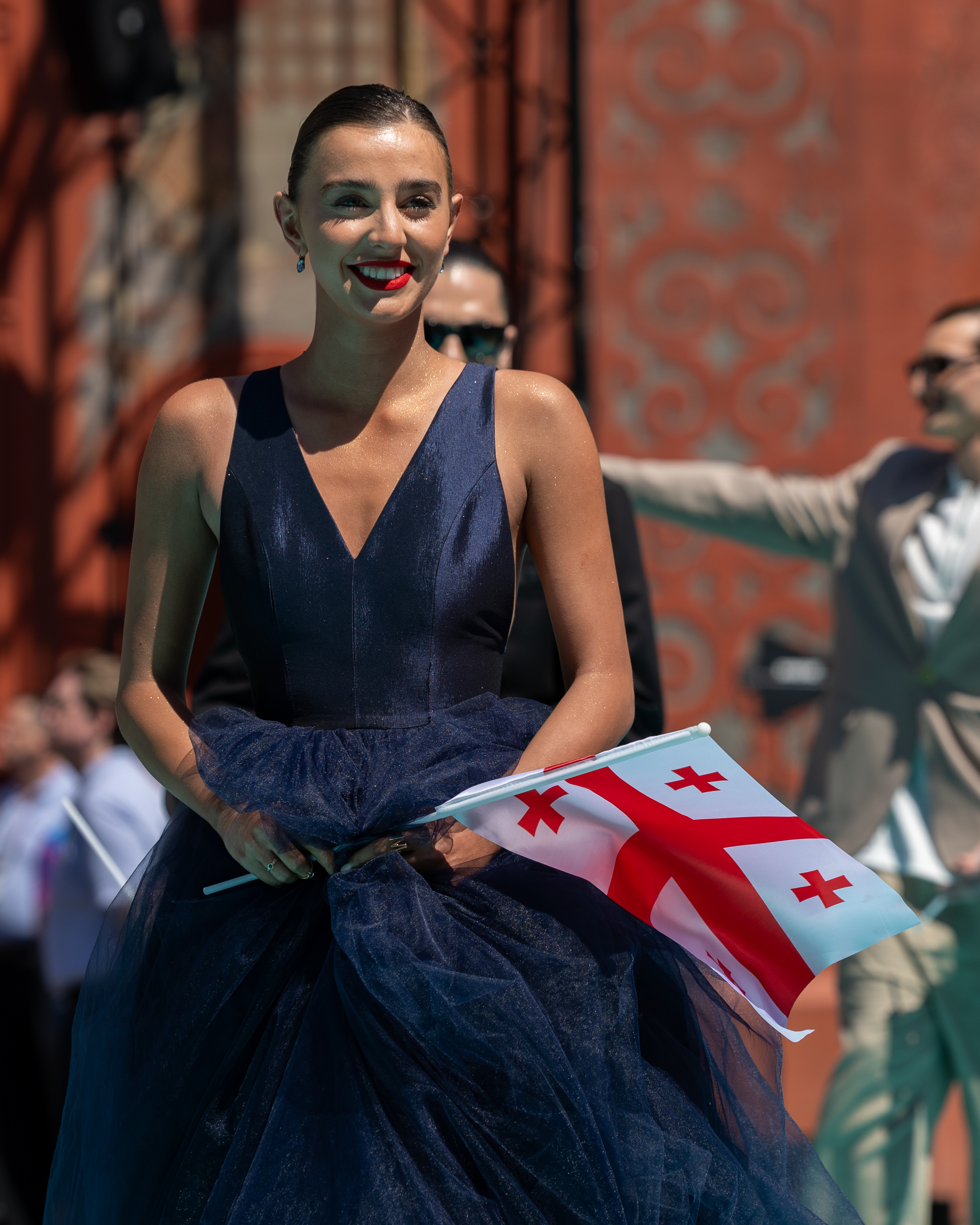
- Shengelia in 2025

Background information
- Born: 14 May 2002 (age 24); Mingrelia, Georgia
- Genres: Pop
- Occupation: Singer
- Instrument: Vocals
- Years active: 2018–present
- Member of: Mix2ura

Mariam Shengelia (Georgian: მარიამ შენგელია; born 14 May 2002) is a Georgian singer. She represented Georgia in the Eurovision Song Contest 2025 with the song "Freedom". She came fifteenth in the semi-final 2 and thirty-third overall.

Shengelia is a member of the Georgian musical group Mix2ura.

== Early life ==
Shengelia was born on 14 May 2002 in the historic region of Mingrelia, and raised in the capital of Tbilisi until she was 10 years old. She then moved west to Zugdidi along with her family. She had developed an interest in singing and performing in her childhood. Shengelia attended the Tbilisi State Conservatoire, where she studied music theory and vocal performance. Her initial musical influences included multiple genres, including jazz, pop and soul.

== Career ==
In 2018, Shengelia first rose to national prominence on the fifth and final season of X Factor Georgia, where she reached the semi-finals. A year later, she competed in the second season of Georgian Idol, which was used to select Georgia's representative for the cancelled Eurovision Song Contest 2020 and she finished sixth place. Had that contest taken place, she could have been one of the backing vocalists for Tornike Kipiani's song "Take Me as I Am," which was selected to represent Georgia that year. In 2021, she competed in the fourth season of The Voice Sakartvelo, where she was eliminated in the semi-finals. Four years later, she finished in runner-up on Tsekvaven Varskvlavebi, which is the Georgian version of the media franchise Dancing with the Stars.

On 14 March 2025, Georgian Public Broadcaster (GPB) announced Freedom, performed by Shengelia as the Georgian entry for the Eurovision Song Contest 2025 in Basel. She finished in 15th place in the second semi-final with 28 points, thus failing to qualify.

== Political views ==
Shengelia has been criticised for publicly supporting Georgian Dream, the ruling party of Georgia, and participating in commercials and concerts supported by it. She stated that by participating in concerts, she wants to spread her primary message, which is peace. According to media reports, she originally took part in protests against the ruling party in 2023 and shared a post in her Facebook account in 2022 proclaiming that she apologize for the actions of the second Garibashvili government in the face of Russian invasion of Ukraine.

== Discography ==
=== Singles ===
Title	Year	Album or EP
"Freedom"	2025	Non-album single

== Awards and nominations ==
Year	Award	Category	Nominee(s)	Result	Ref.
2025	Eurovision Awards	Outstanding Vocals	Herself	Nominated	

Awards and achievements
Preceded by Nutsa Buzaladze with "Firefighter"	Georgia in the Eurovision Song Contest; 2025	Succeeded by Bzikebi with "On Replay"
