= Freedom (Mariam Shengelia song) =

2025 single by Mariam Shengelia

Single by Mariam Shengelia
- Released: 17 March 2025
- Genre: Pop; Georgian music
- Length: 2:50
- Label: GPB; Universal Music Denmark
- Composer: Keti Gabisiani
- Lyricist: Buka Kartozia
- Producer: Keti Gabisiani

Music video
- "Freedom" on YouTube

Eurovision Song Contest 2025 entry
- Country: Georgia
- Artist: Mariam Shengelia
- Languages: Georgian; English
- Composer: Keti Gabisiani
- Lyricist: Buka Kartozia

Finals performance
- Semi-final result: 15th
- Semi-final points: 28

Entry chronology
- ◄ "Firefighter" (2024)
- "On Replay" (2026) ►

Official performance video
- "Freedom" (second semi-final) on YouTube

"Freedom" is the debut single by Georgian singer Mariam Shengelia. It was written by Keti Gabisziani and Buka Kartozia, with the former also producing it. The song was released on 17 March 2025 and represented Georgia in the Eurovision Song Contest 2025.

== Background and composition ==
The music for "Freedom" was composed by Keti Gabisiani, and the words were written by Buka Kartozia. Lyrically, it carries a message of freedom, hope, homeland and determination, giving faith in the following journey. Images of blue and cloudless skies and calm yet stormy seas also reinforced the emotional charge. It also emphasize a pure and unwavering love for freedom and homeland, while Shengelia also states that she has no other wealth to seek.

== Music video and promotion ==
The music video for "Freedom" was directed by Kakha Bukhrashvili and artistically directed by Shako Popiashvili and Nino Tsulaia, which premiered alongside the entry announcement through the official Eurovision Song Contest's YouTube channel.

== Critical reception ==
"Freedom" received largely negative reactions. In a Wiwibloggs review containing several reviews from several critics, the song was rated 3.07 out of 10 points, earning 37th and last out of the 37 songs competing in that year's Eurovision in the site's annual ranking that year. Jon O’Brien from Vulture also ranked the song 37th and last, calling the song a "cacophonous mess". ESC Beat's Doron Lahav ranked the song 34th out of 37, stating that it was "hard to digest", and the song was like "an attempt to merge two different songs". Eva Frantz from the Finnish broadcaster Yle gave the song a 3/10, describing the song as "too sprawling and artistic". It also became the most disliked entry of Eurovision Song Contest 2025 on YouTube by like to dislike ratio.

== Eurovision Song Contest 2025 ==
=== Internal selection ===
On 14 March 2025, Georgian Public Broadcaster (GPB) announced that "Freedom" performed by Mariam Shengelia would be the Georgian entry for the Eurovision Song Contest 2025. Shengelia had previously attempted to represent Georgia in 2020, placing sixth in the second season of Georgian Idol, which was used to select Georgia's representative for the Eurovision Song Contest 2020, which was cancelled. The song was selected from 18 applications received by GPB, with another 20 entries also sent in by foreign songwriters.

=== At Eurovision ===
The Eurovision Song Contest 2025 took place at St. Jakobshalle in Basel, Switzerland, and consisted of two semi-finals held on the respective dates of 13 and 15 May and the final on 17 May 2025. During the allocation draw held on 28 January 2025, Georgia was drawn to compete in the second semi-final, performing in the second half of the show. The song finished in 15th place in the second semi-final with the second fewest points, thus failing to qualify.
