= Georgia in the Eurovision Song Contest 2019 =

- Eurovision Song Contest 2019
- Participating broadcaster: Georgian Public Broadcaster (GPB)
- Country: Georgia
- Selection process: Georgian Idol
- Selection date: 3 March 2019

Competing entry
- Song: "Keep On Going"
- Artist: Oto Nemsadze
- Songwriters: Roman Giorgadze; Diana Giorgadze

Placement
- Semi-final result: Failed to qualify (14th)

Participation chronology

Georgia was represented at the Eurovision Song Contest 2019 with the song "Keep On Going", written by Roman Giorgadze and Diana Giorgadze, and performed by Oto Nemsadze. The Georgian participating broadcaster, Georgian Public Broadcaster (GPB), held the reality television show Georgian Idol in order to select its entry for the contest. The competition resulted in the selection of four finalists that performed potential Eurovision songs during the final on 3 March 2019. The results of a public vote exclusively resulted in the selection of "Sul tsin iare" performed by Oto Nemsadze as the Georgian entry, having received 44.13% of the votes. The song was later retitled for the Eurovision Song Contest and was titled "Keep On Going".

Georgia was drawn to compete in the first semi-final of the Eurovision Song Contest which took place on 14 May 2019. Performing during the show in position 11, "Keep On Going" was not announced among the top 10 entries of the first semi-final and therefore did not qualify to compete in the final. It was later revealed that Georgia placed fourteenth out of the 17 participating countries in the semi-final with 62 points.

== Background ==
Prior to the 2019 contest, the Georgian Public Broadcaster (GPB) had participated in the Eurovision Song Contest representing Georgia eleven times since their first entry in 2007. Its highest placing in the contest, to this point, has been ninth place, which was achieved on two occasions: in 2010 with the song "Shine" performed by Sofia Nizharadze and in 2011 with the song "One More Day" performed by Eldrine. GPB briefly withdrew from the contest in 2009 after the European Broadcasting Union (EBU) rejected its entry, "We Don't Wanna Put In", for perceived political references to Vladimir Putin who was the Russian Prime Minister at the time. The withdrawal and fallout was tied to tense relations between Georgia and then host country Russia, which stemmed from the 2008 Russo-Georgian War. Following the introduction of semi-finals, Georgia has, to this point, failed to qualify to the final on four occasions. In 2018, "For You" performed by the Ethno-Jazz Band Iriao failed to qualify to the final.

As part of its duties as participating broadcaster, GPB organises the selection of its entry in the Eurovision Song Contest and broadcasts the event in the country. The broadcaster confirmed its intentions to participate at the 2019 contest on 17 September 2018. GPB has selected their entry for the contest both through national finals and internal selections in the past. In 2018, it opted to internally select the entry. For its 2019 participation, the entry was selected via the reality television show Georgian Idol.

== Before Eurovision ==
=== Georgian Idol ===
The Georgian entry for the Eurovision Song Contest 2019 was selected through the eighth season of Georgian Idol, the Georgian version of the reality television singing competition format Idols created by Simon Fuller. The competition premiered on 5 January 2019 and concluded with a final on 3 March 2019. All shows in the competition were hosted by Vaniko Tarkhnishvili and Ruska Makashvili with the live shows taking place at the Tbilisi Concert Hall in Tbilisi, broadcast on the GPB First Channel as well as online at the broadcaster's website 1tv.ge.

==== Judges ====
A four-member judging panel determined the contestants that would advance to the live shows and commented on the contestants' performances during the live shows. The judging panel consisted of:

- Tinatin Berdzenishvili – Director of Media and Communications at GPB
- Stephane Mgebrishvili – Musician
- Natia Todua – Singer
- Zaza Shengelia – President of Bravo Records

==== Competing entries ====
GPB opened two separate submissions: one for singers (from 27 October 2018 until 1 December 2018) and one for songs (from 21 December 2018 until 1 February 2019). Applicants attended preliminary auditions held in the following eleven cities across Georgia:

- 27 October 2018 – 1 December 2018: Tbilisi
- 30 October 2018: Telavi and Gurjaani
- 31 October 2018: Akhmeta and Lagodekhi
- 1 November 2018: Gori
- 2 November 2018: Borjomi and Akhaltsikhe
- 6 November 2018: Chiatura
- 13–14 November 2018: Batumi
- 15 November 2018: Kutaisi

38 contestants progressed to the audition shows in front of the judging panel, while over 200 songs were received by the song submission deadline. A seven-member expert commission selected the top three songs from the received submissions, which were announced on 26 February 2019. The expert commission consisted of Davit Evgenidze, Nodiko Tatishvili (who represented Georgia in 2013), Zura Ramishvili, Giorgi Asanishvili, Manana Morchiladze, Lana Kutateladze and Khatuna Koberidze.

==== Contestant progress in the live shows ====
Colour key

–	Contestant was in the bottom two
–	Contestant was in the bottom three
–	Contestant received the fewest public votes and was eliminated
–	Contestant received the most public votes

Contestant	Week 1	Week 2	Week 3	Week 4	Week 5	Week 6
Oto Nemsadze	1st 14.84%	1st 21.90%	2nd 22.57%	2nd 23.09%	2nd 27.23%	1st 44.13%
Liza Kalandadze	3rd 12.97%	2nd 19.42%	1st 24.05%	1st 33.03%	1st 30.18%	2nd 35.51%
Giorgi Nakashidze	7th 7.39%	6th 9.25%	3rd 11.98%	3rd 12.59%	3rd 14.51%	3rd 11.06%
Giorgi Pruidze	6th 8.93%	4th 9.87%	5th 10.96%	4th 10.44%	4th 14.35%	4th 9.30%
Nini Tsnobiladze	8th 7.14%	5th 9.79%	6th 9.93%	5th 10.39%	5th 13.73%	Eliminated (Week 5)
Tamar Lachkhepiani	2nd 13.57%	3rd 12.94%	4th 11.59%	6th 9.65%	Eliminated (Week 4)	
Ikako Aleksidze	5th 11.28%	7th 8.73%	7th 8.92%	Eliminated (Week 3)		
Dima Kobeshavidze	4th 12.15%	8th 8.10%	Eliminated (Week 2)			
Mariam Kakhelishvili	9th 6.44%	Eliminated (Week 1)				
Beso Nemsadze	10th 5.29%	Eliminated (Week 1)				

==== Shows ====
===== Audition shows =====
The judging panel shortlisted 48 contestants following the audition shows aired between 5 January 2019 and 19 January 2019, and selected the top ten that would progress to the live shows from a further 22 shortlisted contestants. Among the contestants were 2010 Georgian Junior Eurovision entrant Mariam Kakhelishvili and member of 2011 Georgian Junior Eurovision winners Candy, Iru Khechanovi.

Auditions Show 1 – 5 January 2019
R/O	Artist	Song	Result
1	Tamar Lachkhepiani	"Over the Rainbow"	Advanced
1	Tamar Lachkhepiani	"Ar madzinebs" (არ მაძინებს)	Advanced
2	Mariam Dokvadze	"A Natural Woman"	Advanced
2	Mariam Dokvadze	"Lale" (ლალე)	Advanced
3	Giorgi Chomakhidze	"Tequila"	—N/a
4	Santa impersonator	"Let It Snow"	—N/a
5	Davit Kalandadze	"White Christmas"	Advanced
6	Afik Navruzov	—	Advanced
7	Natia Nanobashvili	"Clown"	Advanced
7	Natia Nanobashvili	"Neta martla gqvarebodi" (ნეტა მართლა გყვარებოდი)	Advanced
8	Giorgi Nakashidze	"Radioactive"	Advanced
8	Giorgi Nakashidze	"Natvris khe" (ნატვრის ხე)	Advanced
9	Ikako Aleksidze	"Have Yourself a Merry Little Christmas"	Advanced
10	Eto Tskipurishvili	"Can't Help Falling in Love"	—N/a
11	Avtandil Kukhianidze	"Strangers in the Night"	—N/a
12	Mariam Zhordania	"Love on the Brain"	Advanced
12	Mariam Zhordania	"Postalionis simghera" (ფოსტალიონის სიმღერა)	Advanced
13	Mariam Goguadze	"Burnin' Up"	Advanced

Auditions Show 2 – 12 January 2019
R/O	Artist	Song	Result
1	Liza Mebonia	"Summertime"	Advanced
2	Pini Kapanadze	"Oh! Darling"	Advanced
3	Giorgi Pruidze	"Kiss from a Rose"	Advanced
3	Giorgi Pruidze	"Sakutari simghera" (საკუტარი სიმღერა)	Advanced
4	Gedevan Kevlishvili	"Bebos ajika" (ბებოს აჯიკა)	Advanced
5	Imeda Davitadze	"O rakaia" (ო რაკაია)	—N/a
6	Beso Nemsadze	"Ra ikneba shens makhloblad mets viqo" (რა იქნება შენს მახლობლად მეც ვიყო)	Advanced
7	Oto Nemsadze	"Billie Jean"	Advanced
8	Maria Tsimintia	"I Wanna Be Loved by You"	Advanced
8	Maria Tsimintia	"Highway to Hell"	Advanced
9	Anastasia Pirveli	"I Wish You Love"	Advanced
10	Iru Khechanovi	"She Wolf (Falling to Pieces)"	Advanced
10	Iru Khechanovi	"Me Tbilisis kuchebshi" (მე თბილისის ქუჩებში)	Advanced
11	Dima Kobeshavidze	"Sait midikhar" (საით მიდიხარ)	Advanced
11	Dima Kobeshavidze	"Make It Rain"	Advanced
12	Mariam Buadze	"Simghera dolaris kursze" (სიმღერა დოლარის კურსზე)	—N/a
13	Aleqsandre Chekunovi	"Because I Got High"	—N/a
14	Liza Kalandadze	"Kari Kris" (ქარი ქრის)	Advanced
14	Liza Kalandadze	"Nature Boy"	Advanced

Auditions Show 3 – 19 January 2019
R/O	Artist	Song	Result
1	Bacho Chania	"Numb"	Advanced
2	Isev shen	"Isev shen" (ისევ შენ)	Advanced
3	Dzmadnapitsebi Rustavelis 16-idan	"Havana"	Advanced
4	Levan Morbedadze	"Simghera rustavze" (სიმღერა რუსთავზე)	—N/a
5	Barbare Sukhitashvili	"Fallin'"	—N/a
6	Tamuna Liluashvili	"Reflection"	Advanced
7	Malibu Tughushi	—	Advanced
8	Willie Tyrone	"Drown"	Advanced
9	Nini Tsnobiladze	"I'd Rather Go Blind"	Advanced
10	Sali Mirianashvili	"Do It Like a Dude"	Advanced
11	Mariam Kakhelishvili	"Golden Slumbers"	Advanced

Second Qualification Round – 19 January 2019
R/O	Artist	Song	Result
1	Gedevan Kevlishvili	"Born This Way"	—N/a
2	Liza Mebonia	"When We Were Young"	—N/a
3	Willie Tyrone	"Faith"	—N/a
4	Oto Ghurtskaia	"Wander This World"	—N/a
5	Mariam Kakhelishvili	"One Moment in Time"	Advanced
6	Mariam Dokvadze	"You Got to Love Me"	—N/a
7	Ikako Aleksidze	"Never Enough"	Advanced
8	Sali Mirianashvili	"Runnin' (Lose It All)"	—N/a
9	Eto Tskipurishvili	"I Will"	—N/a
10	Dima Kobeshavidze	"Let It Be"	Advanced
11	Mariam Goguadze	"We Found Love"	—N/a
12	Liza Kalandadze	"You Only Live Twice"	Advanced
13	Nini Tsnobiladze	"Golden"	Advanced
14	Giorgi Pruidze	"A Song for You"	Advanced
15	Natia Nanobashvili	"What a Girl Wants"	—N/a
16	Giorgi Nakashidze	"Enter Sandman"	Advanced
17	Malibu Tugushi	"Hello"	—N/a
18	Beso Nemsadze	"Ya ne sdamsya bez boyu" (Я не здамся без бою)	Advanced
19	Tamuna Liluashvili	"It's a Man's, Man's, Man's World"	—N/a
20	Oto Nemsadze	"Heaven on Their Minds"	Advanced
21	Tamar Lachkhepiani	"That's Life"	Advanced
22	Mariam Zhordania	"Rolling on the River"	—N/a

===== Live shows =====
Two of the ten contestants were eliminated in the first live show on 26 January 2019, while one was eliminated during each of the second to fifth live shows between 2 February 2019 and 23 February 2019. The results of the live shows were determined exclusively by a public vote through televoting and voting via Facebook messenger.

Show 1 – 26 January 2019
R/O	Artist	Song	Televote	Place
1	Giorgi Pruidze	"Somebody to Love"	8.93%	6
2	Nini Tsnobiladze	"These Are the Days of Our Lives"	7.14%	8
3	Oto Nemsadze	"We Will Rock You"	14.84%	1
3	Oto Nemsadze	"We Are the Champions"	14.84%	1
4	Ikako Aleksidze	"Under Pressure"	11.28%	5
5	Beso Nemsadze	"Fat Bottomed Girls"	5.29%	10
6	Tamar Lachkhepiani	"Radio Ga Ga"	13.57%	2
7	Giorgi Nakashidze	"The Show Must Go On"	7.39%	7
8	Liza Kalandadze	"Who Wants to Live Forever"	12.97%	3
9	Dima Kobeshavidze	"Love of My Life"	12.15%	4
10	Mariam Kakhelishvili	"I Want to Break Free"	6.44%	9

Show 2 – 2 February 2019
R/O	Artist	Song	Televote	Place
1	Giorgi Pruidze	"Naiarevs" (ნაიარევს)	9.87%	4
2	Ikako Aleksidze	"Silent Swim"	8.73%	7
2	Ikako Aleksidze	"Zghvas gavkhar" (ზღვას გავხარ)	8.73%	7
3	Tamar Lachkhepiani	"Miqvarkhar" (მიყვარხარ)	12.94%	3
3	Tamar Lachkhepiani	"Istorias darcheba" (ისტორიას დარჩება)	12.94%	3
4	Dima Kobeshavidze	"Mango"	8.10%	8
5	Nini Tsnobiladze	"Menatreba" (მენატრება)	9.79%	5
6	Giorgi Nakashidze	"Modi ak" (მოდი აკ)	9.25%	6
7	Liza Kalandadze	"Orghani 78" (ორღანი 78)	19.42%	2
8	Oto Nemsadze	"Sakartvelo" (საქართველო)	21.90%	1

Show 3 – 9 February 2019
R/O	Artist	Song	Televote	Place
1	Tamar Lachkhepiani	"Lale" (ლალე)	11.59%	4
2	Nini Tsnobiladze	"Kuchashi ertkhel" (ქუჩაში ერთხელ)	9.93%	6
3	Giorgi Nakashidze	"Natvris khe" (ნატვრის ხე)	11.98%	3
4	Giorgi Pruidze	"Mze da shokoladebi" (მზე და შოკოლადები)	10.96%	5
5	Ikako Aleksidze	"Didkhans gelodi" (დიდხანს გელოდი)	8.92%	7
6	Oto Nemsadze	"Nami vels" (ნამი ველს)	22.57%	2
7	Liza Kalandadze	"Artificial Love"	24.05%	1

Show 4 – 16 February 2019
R/O	Artist	Song	Televote	Place
1	Tamar Lachkhepiani	"Serenada" (სერენადა)	9.65%	6
2	Giorgi Pruidze	"Me saidumlos shenakhva vitsi" (მე საიდუმლოს შენახვა ვიცი)	10.44%	4
3	Liza Kalandadze	"Shemodgomis qvavilebs" (შემოდგომის ყვავილებს)	33.03%	1
4	Giorgi Nakashidze	"Kari Kris" (ქარი ქრის)	12.59%	3
5	Nini Tsnobiladze	"Qviteli potlebi" (ყვითელი ფოთლები)	10.39%	5
6	Oto Nemsadze	"Tselitsadis 4 dro" (წელიწადის 4 დრო)	23.09%	2

Show 5 – 23 February 2019
R/O	Artist	Song	Televote	Place
1	Oto Nemsadze	"Come Together"	27.23%	2
1	Oto Nemsadze	"Rats am kveqnad siqvaruli mepobs" (რაც ამ ქვეყნად სიყვარული მეფობს)	27.23%	2
2	Giorgi Pruidze	"Feeling Good"	14.35%	4
2	Giorgi Pruidze	"Emotions"	14.35%	4
3	Nini Tsnobiladze	"Am I The One"	13.73%	5
3	Nini Tsnobiladze	"Chemtan aghar" (ჩემთან აღარ)	13.73%	5
4	Liza Kalandadze	"I Put a Spell on You"	30.18%	1
4	Liza Kalandadze	"Nu medzakhi" (ნუ მეძახი)	30.18%	1
5	Giorgi Nakashidze	"Sweet Dreams"	14.51%	3
5	Giorgi Nakashidze	"Petkavs" (ფეთქავს)	14.51%	3

==== Final ====
Each of the four remaining contestants presented one of the three candidate Eurovision songs during the final live show on 3 March 2019. The winner, "Sul tsin iare" performed by Oto Nemsadze, was determined exclusively by a public vote through televoting and voting via Facebook messenger.

Final – 3 March 2019
R/O	Artist	Song	Songwriter(s)	Televote	Place
1	Giorgi Nakashidze	"Sul tsin iare" (სულ წინ იარე)	Roman Giorgadze, Diana Giorgadze	13,483	3
2	Liza Kalandadze	"Sevdisperi zgva" (სევდისფერი ზღვა)	Levan Basharuli	43,289	2
3	Oto Nemsadze	"Sul tsin iare" (სულ წინ იარე)	Roman Giorgadze, Diana Giorgadze	53,798	1
4	Giorgi Pruidze	"Me mjera" (მე მჯერა)	Tamar Babilua	11,337	4

=== Promotion ===
Prior to the contest, Oto Nemsadze specifically promoted "Keep On Going" as the Georgian Eurovision entry on 6 April 2019 by performing during the Eurovision in Concert event which was held at the AFAS Live venue in Amsterdam, Netherlands and hosted by Cornald Maas and Marlayne.

In April 2019, the official music video of "Keep On Going" was released. The video, directed by Giorgi Ebralidze, was filmed at a number of locations in Georgia including Maltakva village, Enguri Bridge, and Tbilisi, and also featured singers of the ensemble Shavnabada.

== At Eurovision ==
According to Eurovision rules, all nations with the exceptions of the host country and the "Big Five" (France, Germany, Italy, Spain and the United Kingdom) are required to qualify from one of two semi-finals in order to compete for the final; the top ten countries from each semi-final progress to the final. The European Broadcasting Union (EBU) split up the competing countries into six different pots based on voting patterns from previous contests, with countries with favourable voting histories put into the same pot. On 28 January 2019, a special allocation draw was held which placed each country into one of the two semi-finals, as well as which half of the show they would perform in. Georgia was placed into the first semi-final, to be held on 14 May 2019, and was scheduled to perform in the second half of the show.

Once all the competing songs for the 2019 contest had been released, the running order for the semi-finals was decided by the shows' producers rather than through another draw, so that similar songs were not placed next to each other. Georgia was set to perform in position 11, following the entry from Belgium and before the entry from Australia.

The two semi-finals and the final were broadcast in Georgia on GPB First Channel with commentary by Junior Eurovision Song Contest 2017 co-host, Helen Kalandadze, and member of 2018 Georgian Eurovision entrant Ethno-Jazz Band Iriao, Gaga Abashidze. Nodiko Tatishvili also took part in the commentary for the final. The Georgian spokesperson, who announced the top 12-point score awarded by the Georgian jury during the final, was Gaga Abashidze.

=== Semi-final ===
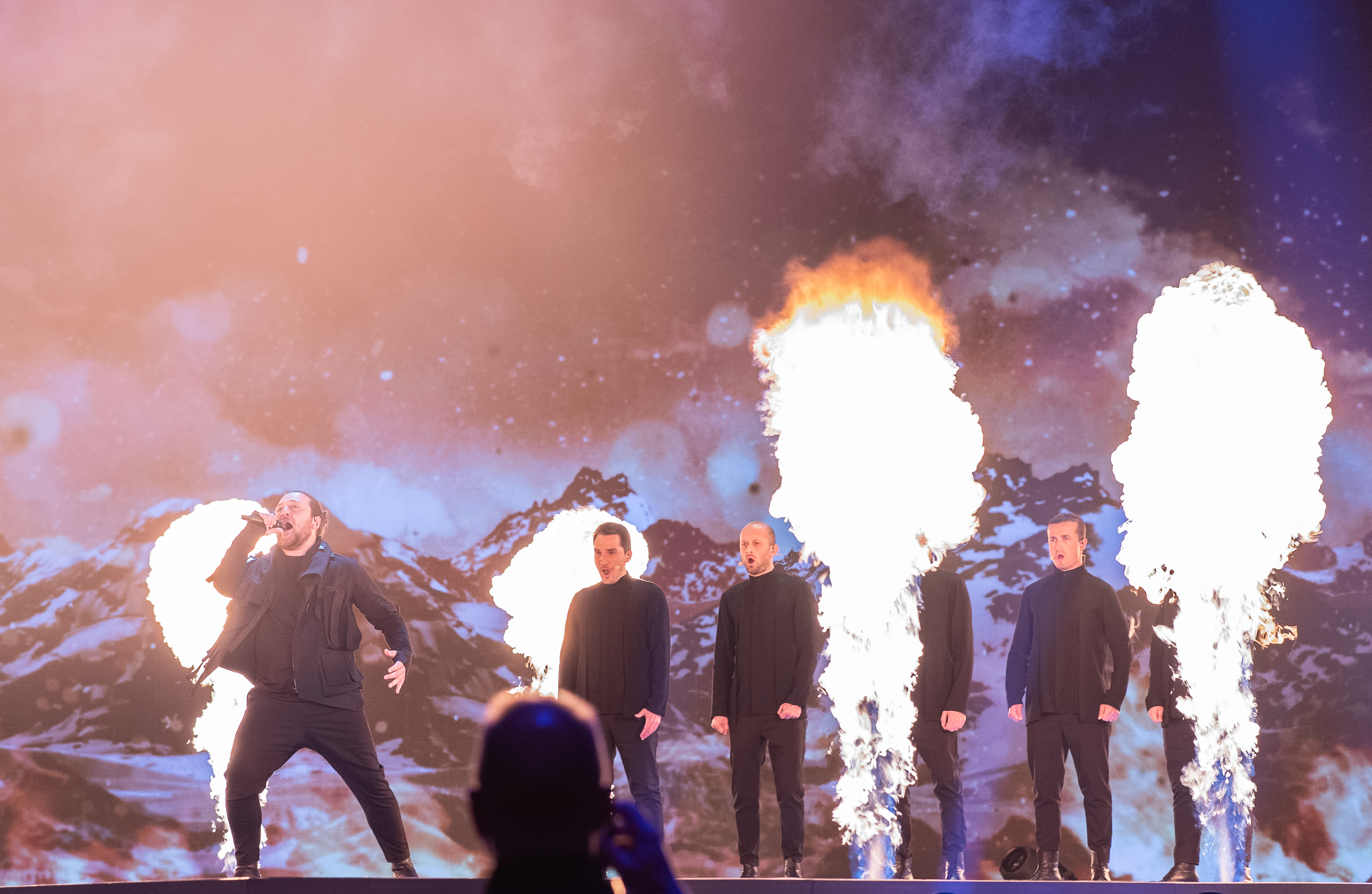
Oto Nemsadze during a rehearsal before the first semi-final

Oto Nemsadze took part in technical rehearsals on 5 and 9 May, followed by dress rehearsals on 13 and 14 May. This included the jury show on 13 May where the professional juries of each country watched and voted on the competing entries.

The Georgian performance featured Oto Nemsadze in a black costume designed by Georgian designer Giorgi Shaghashvili, joined on stage by five backing vocalists which first appeared as silhouettes. The LED screens transitioned from a snowy mountain background with starry skies and barbed wires to images of fire, during which the stage colours were red. The performance also featured smoke and pyrotechnic flame effects. The five backing performers that joined Oto Nemsadze were: Dato Tsintsadze, Giga Chigogidze, Giorgi Kananadze, Mikheil Javakhishvili and Spartak Sharikadze. Mikheil Javakhishvili previously represented Georgia in 2018 as part of the Ethno-Jazz Band Iriao.

At the end of the show, Georgia was not announced among the top 10 entries in the first semi-final and therefore failed to qualify to compete in the final. It was later revealed that Georgia placed fourteenth in the semi-final, receiving a total of 62 points: 33 points from the televoting and 29 points from the juries.

=== Voting ===
Voting during the three shows involved each country awarding two sets of points from 1-8, 10 and 12: one from their professional jury and the other from televoting. Each nation's jury consisted of five music industry professionals who are citizens of the country they represent, with their names published before the contest to ensure transparency. This jury judged each entry based on: vocal capacity; the stage performance; the song's composition and originality; and the overall impression by the act. In addition, no member of a national jury was permitted to be related in any way to any of the competing acts in such a way that they cannot vote impartially and independently. The individual rankings of each jury member as well as the nation's televoting results were released shortly after the grand final.

Below is a breakdown of points awarded to Georgia and awarded by Georgia in the first semi-final and grand final of the contest, and the breakdown of the jury voting and televoting conducted during the two shows:

==== Points awarded to Georgia ====
Points awarded to Georgia (Semi-final 1)
Score	Televote	Jury
12 points		
10 points	Cyprus; Greece	Belarus
8 points		
7 points	Israel	Cyprus
6 points		
5 points		Australia
4 points	France	
3 points		
2 points		France; Hungary; Montenegro
1 point	Belarus; San Marino	Czech Republic

==== Points awarded by Georgia ====
Points awarded by Georgia (Semi-final 1)
Score	Televote	Jury
12 points	San Marino	Czech Republic
10 points	Cyprus	Greece
8 points	Estonia	Estonia
7 points	Belarus	Slovenia
6 points	Iceland	Serbia
5 points	Slovenia	Cyprus
4 points	Greece	Australia
3 points	Serbia	Belarus
2 points	Portugal	Belgium
1 point	Czech Republic	Hungary

Points awarded by Georgia (Final)
Score	Televote	Jury
12 points	Cyprus	Czech Republic
10 points	San Marino	Azerbaijan
8 points	Russia	Netherlands
7 points	Azerbaijan	Denmark
6 points	Sweden	Cyprus
5 points	Netherlands	France
4 points	Israel	Slovenia
3 points	Iceland	Switzerland
2 points	North Macedonia	Sweden
1 point	Italy	United Kingdom

==== Detailed voting results ====
The following members comprised the Georgian jury:

- Khatuna Koberidze (jury chairperson) – radio musical program producer
- Mariko Lezhava – singer, vocal coach
- Boris Shkhiani – musical producer
- Levan Abshilava (Jojo) – singer, represented Georgia in the 2018 contest as part of Iriao
- Lado

Detailed voting results from Georgia (Semi-final 1)
R/O	Country	Jury							Televote	
R/O	Country	K. Koberidze	M. Lezhava	B. Shkhiani	Jojo	Lado	Rank	Points	Rank	Points
01	Cyprus	8	4	5	8	9	6	5	2	10
02	Montenegro	6	15	14	12	14	13		12	
03	Finland	12	9	15	13	16	15		14	
04	Poland	7	13	11	16	13	14		16	
05	Slovenia	2	2	8	10	11	4	7	6	5
06	Czech Republic	3	1	1	1	1	1	12	10	1
07	Hungary	14	12	9	3	12	10	1	15	
08	Belarus	9	6	4	9	10	8	3	4	7
09	Serbia	10	7	3	5	8	5	6	8	3
10	Belgium	13	8	12	6	4	9	2	13	
11	Georgia									
12	Australia	5	11	7	7	6	7	4	11	
13	Iceland	15	14	10	11	7	12		5	6
14	Estonia	4	5	2	4	2	3	8	3	8
15	Portugal	16	10	13	14	5	11		9	2
16	Greece	1	3	6	2	3	2	10	7	4
17	San Marino	11	16	16	15	15	16		1	12

Detailed voting results from Georgia (Final)
R/O	Country	Jury							Televote	
R/O	Country	K. Koberidze	M. Lezhava	B. Shkhiani	Jojo	Lado	Rank	Points	Rank	Points
01	Malta	7	16	8	9	22	12		24	
02	Albania	16	15	20	19	23	21		21	
03	Czech Republic	2	3	1	1	1	1	12	17	
04	Germany	5	19	23	22	20	16		25	
05	Russia	26	26	26	26	26	26		3	8
06	Denmark	1	17	9	10	3	4	7	22	
07	San Marino	21	25	25	24	25	25		2	10
08	North Macedonia	9	10	15	16	21	17		9	2
09	Sweden	17	6	6	7	19	9	2	5	6
10	Slovenia	4	9	10	5	18	7	4	15	
11	Cyprus	8	4	4	14	6	5	6	1	12
12	Netherlands	18	1	3	4	4	3	8	6	5
13	Greece	6	18	12	13	7	11		20	
14	Israel	23	23	24	25	17	24		7	4
15	Norway	24	20	21	21	16	23		18	
16	United Kingdom	10	12	5	8	13	10	1	26	
17	Iceland	25	24	19	20	12	20		8	3
18	Estonia	19	13	11	12	5	13		14	
19	Belarus	11	14	17	18	24	19		11	
20	Azerbaijan	3	2	2	3	2	2	10	4	7
21	France	14	5	7	6	9	6	5	12	
22	Italy	20	7	14	17	8	14		10	1
23	Serbia	12	11	13	15	11	15		23	
24	Switzerland	15	8	18	2	10	8	3	13	
25	Australia	13	22	16	11	14	18		16	
26	Spain	22	21	22	23	15	22		19	
