= Oto Nemsadze =

Georgian singer (born 1989)

Oto Nemsadze ოთო ნემსაძე
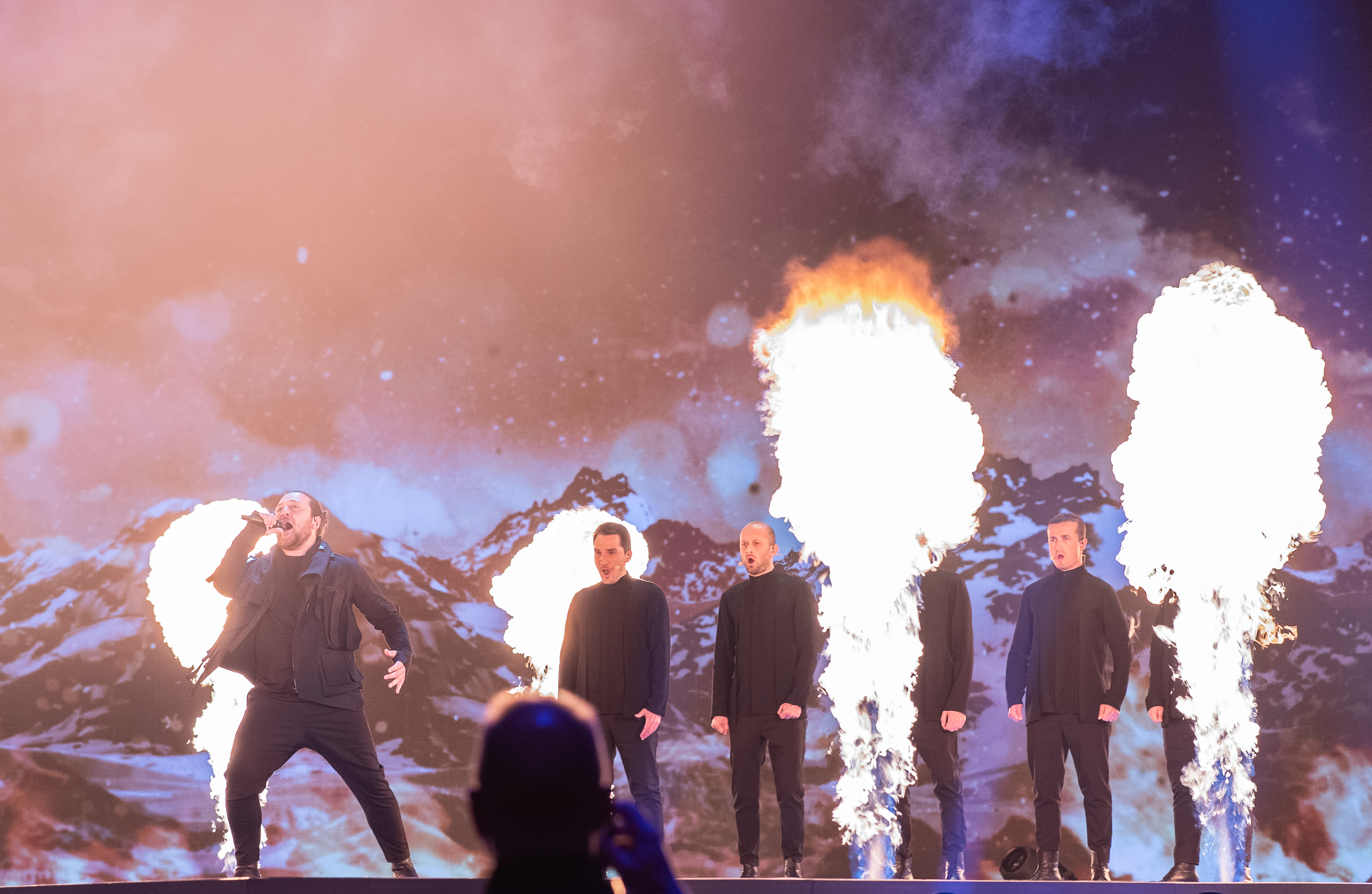

Background information
- Born: Otar Nemsadze; 18 June 1989 (age 37); Gori, Georgian SSR, Soviet Union
- Occupation: Singer
- Years active: 2010–present

Otar Nemsadze (Georgian: ოთო ნემსაძე; born 18 June 1989) is a Georgian singer. Nemsadze is best known for winning season five of Geostar in 2010. He previously participated in season three of The Voice of Ukraine, finishing second.

In 2017, he participated in the Georgian selection for Eurovision with the band Limbo. Their song "Dear God" finished 10th with 60 points. He represented Georgia at the Eurovision Song Contest 2019 with the song "Sul tsin iare", having won Georgian Idol for a second time on 3 March, but his song failed to qualify for the Eurovision final. He acted as Georgia's spokesperson in the grand final of the Eurovision Song Contest 2021, announcing the points awarded by the Georgian jury.

== Discography ==
=== Studio albums ===
- Another (2026)

=== Singles ===
- "Dear God" (with Limbo) (2017)
- "Sul tsin iare" (2019)
- "Mkidia" (with Limbo) (2025)
- "Dagvatenda" (with Limbo) (2025)

Awards and achievements
Preceded by Ethno-Jazz Band Iriao with "For You"	Georgia in the Eurovision Song Contest; 2019	Succeeded by Tornike Kipiani with "Take Me as I Am"
