= You (Tornike Kipiani song) =

2021 song by Tornike Kipiani

Single by Tornike Kipiani
- Released: 15 March 2021
- Genre: Rock; pop rock; blues rock
- Length: 3:03
- Label: Universal Music Denmark
- Composer(s): Tornike Kipiani

Tornike Kipiani singles chronology
"Take Me as I Am" (2020)	"You" (2021)

Music video
- "You" on YouTube

Eurovision Song Contest 2021 entry
- Country: Georgia
- Artist(s): Tornike Kipiani
- Language: English
- Composer(s): Tornike Kipiani
- Lyricist(s): Tornike Kipiani

Finals performance
- Semi-final result: 16th
- Semi-final points: 16

Entry chronology
- ◄ "Take Me as I Am" (2020)
- "Lock Me In" (2022) ►

"You" is a song by Georgian singer Tornike Kipiani. The song represented Georgia in the Eurovision Song Contest 2021 in Rotterdam, the Netherlands.

== Eurovision Song Contest ==
=== Internal selection ===
On 26 January 2021, GPB confirmed that Tornike Kipiani would represent Georgia in the 2021 contest.

=== In Eurovision ===
The 65th edition of the Eurovision Song Contest took place in Rotterdam, the Netherlands and consisted of two semi-finals on 18 May and 20 May 2021, and the grand final on 22 May 2021. According to the Eurovision rules, all participating countries, except the host nation and the "Big Five", consisting of France, Germany, Italy, Spain and the United Kingdom, are required to qualify from one of two semi-finals to compete for the final, although the top 10 countries from the respective semi-final progress to the grand final. On 17 November 2020, it was announced that Georgia would be performing in the second half of the second semi-final of the contest.
