= Nini Badurashvili =

Georgian singer and actress

Nini Badurashvili (Georgian: ნინი ბადურაშვილი; born 27 December 1985 in Tbilisi) is a Georgian singer and actress.

== Biography ==
Badurashvili was born in the family of director Erekle Badurashvili and Georgian singer and actress Eka Kakhiani. She was a Basti-Bubu soloist from the age of six. She shot the first music video as a child on the song "Nana Chemo Baia" by Dato Evgenidze. She was also a member of the group Stephane and 3G. She has played in several films, most notable one was "The Conflict Zone", where she played Nini's role.
