= Iriao =

Georgian jazz and folk group

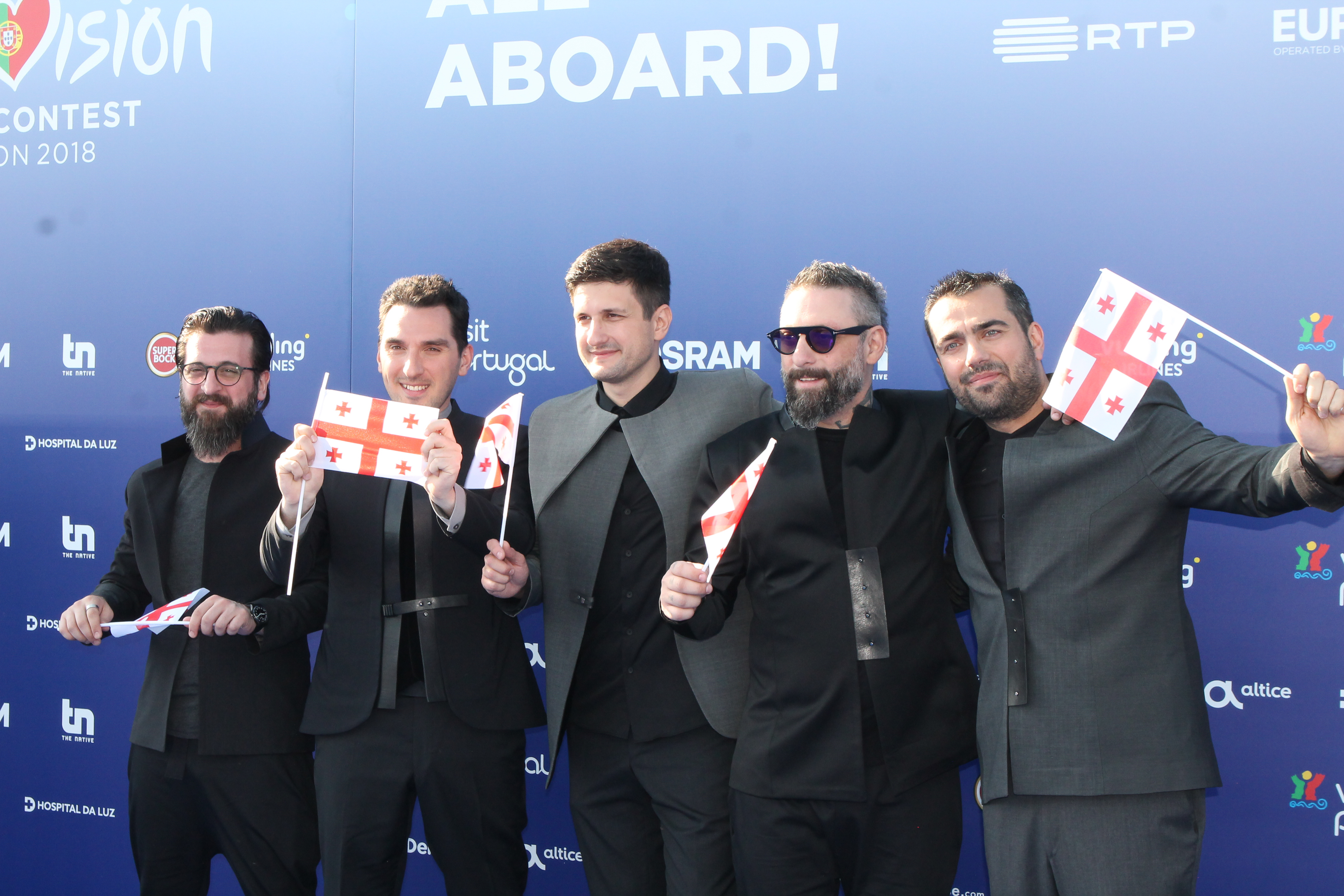
- Iriao in 2018

Background information
- Also known as: Ethno-Jazz Band Iriao
- Origin: Georgia
- Genres: Jazz; ethno folk
- Years active: 2013–present
- Members: David Malazonia; Nugzar Kavtaradze; Bidzina Murgulia; Levan Abshilava; Shalva Gelekva; George Abashidze; Mikheil Javakhishvili

Iriao (Georgian: ირიაო), also known as Ethno-Jazz Band Iriao, are a Georgian jazz and ethno folk group, led by David Malazonia (composition and keyboard). The band plays a combination of traditional Georgian polyphonic singing and jazz. They performed at the 2014 edition of the Borneo Jazz Festival in Malaysia. They represented Georgia at the Eurovision Song Contest 2018 in Lisbon, Portugal with the song "Sheni gulistvis" (English: "For You").

Awards and achievements
Preceded by Tamara Gachechiladze with "Keep the Faith"	Georgia in the Eurovision Song Contest; 2018	Succeeded by Oto Nemsadze with "Keep On Going"
