= Merab Amzoevi =

Yezidi musical artist from Georgia and Russia

Merab Amzoevi მერაბ ამზოევი
- Born: Merab Amzoev; January 19, 1992 (age 34); Tbilisi, Georgia
- Genre: pop
- Occupations: Singer, songwriter
- Instrument: Guitar
- Years active: 2017–present
- Website: merabamzoevi.ru

Merab Amzoev (Georgian: მერაბ ამზოევი; born 19 January 1992), known professionally as ''Merab Amzoevi'', is a Georgian and Russian singer and songwriter of Yezidi heritage.

== Biography ==
He was born on 19 January 1992 in Tbilisi, Georgia, into a Yezidi family. He also has a sister..

For a time, he moved with his family to the Russian city of Novorossiysk, where he spent part of his childhood before returning to Georgia. He inherited his musical talent from his father, a musician, and at age 15 began learning to play guitar and sing.. He worked for a time as a general laborer. He played football for about ten years, but then realized it was not for him and left the sport.

In 2017, he took part in the television music programs X Factor and Georgian Idol, where he came within a step of winning. After this, some of the audience first learned about Amzoev. In 2020, he was one of the participants in the Georgian national selection for the Eurovision Song Contest, but the contest itself was cancelled that year due to the COVID-19 pandemic.

At first, he posted covers of well-known songs, which he sang and continues to sing in Georgian, Russian, English, Italian, Spanish and French. These covers gained and continue to gain millions of views online, which added to his listeners and audience.In 2024, his first EP, ''Vremenno'' ("Temporarily"), was released. He tours actively and releases music.

== Discography ==
- 2024 – ''Vremenno'' (EP).

== Charts and rankings ==
The track "Bylyby krylya" ("If I Had Wings") entered many music platform charts, including the VKontakte chart (top 20), the Yandex Music chart (top 20), the Apple Music chart (top 20), the MTS Music chart (top 20), and the Shazam chart (top 20).

== See also ==
- List of Yazidi people

== Links ==
- Diasamidze, E. "მერაბ ამზოევი გიორგი გაბუნიას საჯაროდ მიმართავს — «აღარ დავინახავ თქვენს ცრემლებს»" [Merab Amzoevi publicly addresses Giorgi Gabunia: "I will no longer see your tears"]. Tia.ge (in Georgian).
- "მეუღლის რა საქციელი არ მოეწონა მერაბ ამზოევს და რაში აძლევს ის ცოლს თავისუფლებას" [What behavior of his spouse Merab Amzoevi disliked, and in what he gives his wife freedom]. Tbiliselebi (in Georgian).
- "მერაბ ამზოევი კლინიკაში გადაიყვანეს — რა მოხდა «იქს ფაქტორის» რეპეტიციაზე?" [Merab Amzoevi taken to a clinic: What happened at the "X Factor" rehearsal?]. Akhali Taoba (in Georgian). May 2017.
- "მერაბ ამზოევი — «სამწუხაროდ თუ საბედნიეროდ ჩემთვის კონკურსი დამთავრდა»" [Merab Amzoevi: "Unfortunately or fortunately, the competition is over for me"]. Akhali Taoba (in Georgian). June 2017.
- "სოფია ქავთარაძე: «გოგონები მერაბს ისე დაესივნენ, რომ შვილის გაჩენა გადავწყვიტე» — მერაბ ამზოევი ბიჭის მამა გახდება" [Sophia Kavtaradze: "The girls swarmed Merab so much that I decided to have a child": Merab Amzoevi will be the father of a boy]. Akhali Taoba (in Georgian). December 2017.
