= Tornike Kipiani =

Georgian singer

Tornike Kipiani თორნიკე ყიფიანი
- Born: 11 December 1987 (age 38); Tbilisi, Georgian SSR, USSR
- Occupation: Singer
- Years active: 2014–present

Tornike Kipiani (Georgian: თორნიკე ყიფიანი; IPA: [toɾnikʼe qʼipiani]; born 11 December 1987) is a Georgian singer. Kipiani started his musical career at the age of 19, forming the band The Circular Corner. In 2012, he auditioned for the Georgian talent show Magtifan on Maestro, placing in the top five of the competition. Kipiani also won the first season of X Factor Georgia in 2014, mentored by Tamta.

He entered the selection process for Georgia in the Eurovision Song Contest 2017 with the song "You Are My Sunshine", sung with Giorgi Bolotashvili. The song finished 23rd out of the 25 entries in the national final. However he was selected to represent his country in the Eurovision Song Contest 2020 after winning Georgian Idol. He was to perform in Rotterdam, Netherlands with the song "Take Me as I Am", however the contest was cancelled due to the COVID-19 pandemic. Instead, he represented Georgia at the Eurovision Song Contest 2021 with the song "You", but he failed to qualify to the grand final.

Outside of music, Kipiani works as an architect. He has three children.

== Discography ==
=== Albums ===
- 2016: Luck

=== Singles ===
- 2017: "You Are My Sunshine" (with Giorgi Bolotashvili)
- 2020: "Take Me as I Am"
- 2021: "You"

Awards and achievements
| Preceded by First | X Factor Georgia; Winner; 2014 | Succeeded by Giorgi Nakashidze |
| Preceded by Oto Nemsadze with "Keep On Going" | Georgia in the Eurovision Song Contest; 2020 (cancelled) | Succeeded by Himself with "You" |
| Preceded by Himself with "Take Me as I Am" | Georgia in the Eurovision Song Contest; 2021 | Succeeded by Circus Mircus with "Lock Me In" |
