= Take Me as I Am (Tornike Kipiani song) =

2020 song by Tornike Kipiani

Single by Tornike Kipiani
- Released: 2 March 2020
- Length: 2:53
- Label: Universal Music Denmark
- Songwriters: Tornike Kipiani; Aleko Berdzenishvili

Tornike Kipiani singles chronology
"You Are My Sunshine" (2017)	"Take Me as I Am" (2020)	"You" (2021)

Eurovision Song Contest 2020 entry
- Country: Georgia
- Artist: Tornike Kipiani
- Language: English
- Composers: Tornike Kipiani; Aleko Berdzenishvili
- Lyricists: Tornike Kipiani; Aleko Berdzenishvili

Finals performance
- Semi-final result: Contest cancelled

Entry chronology
- ◄ "Keep On Going" (2019)
- "You" (2021) ►

"Take Me as I Am" is a song performed by Georgian singer Tornike Kipiani released on 2 March 2020. It was chosen to represent Georgia in the Eurovision Song Contest 2020 on 30 January 2020. In the song's lyrics, he states not wanting to follow western European ideals (such as "talk like an Englishman", "dress like an Italian", "dance like a Spanish guy", "play like a German" and "smell like a French homme"), and then says "I love you" in their languages.

== Background ==
After winning Georgian Idol, Kipiani was selected to represent Georgia in the Eurovision Song Contest 2020. The song was internally selected by Georgian Public Broadcasting.

== Eurovision Song Contest ==
The song was selected to represent Georgia in the Eurovision Song Contest 2020 after Tornike Kipiani won Georgian Idol, which was used as the Georgian national selection that chose Georgia's entry for the Eurovision Song Contest. On 28 January 2020, it was announced that the song would be performed in the second half of the second semi-final of the contest to be held on 14 May 2020. On the Eurovision Song Celebration live broadcast on YouTube in the place of Semi Final 2, it was revealed he would have performed 16th, between Portugal and Bulgaria.
