= Stephane and 3G =

Georgian pop band

Stephane and 3G სტეფანე და 3G
- Origin: Georgia
- Genres: Pop
- Years active: 2009
- Members: Stephane Mgebrishvili; Nini Badurashvili; Tamara Gachechiladze; Kristine Imedadze
- Website: http://www.stephane-3g.com/

Stephane and 3G (Georgian: სტეფანე და 3G) are a Georgian pop group consisting of 4 members: Stephane Mgebrishvili, Nini Badurashvili, Tamara Gachechiladze and Kristine Imedadze.

== Eurovision and withdrawal ==
On 1 March 2008, Stephane and 3G participated in the Georgian national final to represent the country at the Eurovision Song Contest 2008 in Belgrade, Serbia. The band came 4th with the song I'm Free losing out to eventual winner Diana Gurtskaya.

On 18 February 2009, Stephane and 3G participated again and won the Georgian national final, therefore the band were going to represent Georgia at the Eurovision Song Contest 2009 in Moscow, Russia, with the song We Don't Wanna Put In. However, on 10 March 2009, the European Broadcasting Union ruled that the song lyrics "do not comply with Section 4 Rule 9 of the Rules of the 54th Eurovision Song Contest, and cannot take part in the competition as such", which meant that Georgia would have had to rewrite the song or choose another entry. A spokesman for the EBU said, "No lyrics, speeches, gestures of a political or similar nature shall be permitted. On March 11, 2009, Georgia decided to withdraw from Eurovision 2009, stating that EBU had been pressured into wanting to change the lyrics by Russia. The EBU stated the song's lyrics breached their guidelines regarding political messages.

One of the group's members, Tamara Gachechiladze, represented Georgia in the Eurovision Song Contest 2017.

== Discography ==
=== Albums ===
- 2010: We Don't Wanna Put In

=== Singles ===
- 2009: We Don't Wanna Put In
