= Georgia in the Eurovision Song Contest 2009 =

- Eurovision Song Contest 2009
- Participating broadcaster: Georgian Public Broadcaster (GPB)
- Country: Georgia
- Selection process: National final
- Selection date: 18 February 2009

Competing entry
- Song: "We Don't Wanna Put In"
- Artist: Stephane and 3G
- Songwriters: Stephane Mgebrishvili; Bibi Kvachadze

Placement
- Final result: Withdrawn

Participation chronology

Georgia was set to be represented at the Eurovision Song Contest 2009 with the song "We Don't Wanna Put In", written by Stephane Mgebrishvili and Bibi Kvachadze, and performed by the group Stephane and 3G. The Georgian participating broadcaster, Georgian Public Broadcaster (GPB), held a national final in order to select its entry for the contest. An open call for submissions was held which resulted in the shortlisting of ten entries that were presented to the public during a televised production on 18 February 2009. The results of a public televote combined with the votes of an expert jury resulted in the selection of "We Don't Wanna Put In" performed by Stephane and 3G as the Georgian entry.

Georgia was drawn to compete in the first semi-final of the Eurovision Song Contest which took place on 12 May 2009. However, on 11 March, GPB announced its withdrawal from the contest after "We Don't Wanna Put In" was rejected by the European Broadcasting Union (EBU) for perceived political references to Russian Prime Minister Vladimir Putin.

== Background ==
Prior to the 2009 Contest, Georgian Public Broadcaster (GPB) had participated in the Eurovision Song Contest representing Georgia two times since their first entry in 2007. Its highest placing in the contest, to this point, has been eleventh place, which was achieved in 2008 with the song "Peace Will Come" performed by Diana Gurtskaya. Georgia had managed to qualify to the final on both occasion the nation has participated in.

As part of its duties as participating broadcaster, GPB organises the selection of its entry in the Eurovision Song Contest and broadcasts the event in the country. Despite initially announcing on 28 August 2008 that it would not participate in the 2009 contest in protest to host country Russia's foreign policies caused by the 2008 South Ossetia war (also known as the Russo-Georgian War), stating that they refuse to "participate in a contest organised by a country that violates human rights and international laws", the broadcaster ultimately confirmed its intentions to participate at the 2009 contest on 19 December 2008 following talks with the European Broadcasting Union (EBU) and taking into account Georgia's victory at the Junior Eurovision Song Contest 2008, in which Russia awarded top marks to the country.

== Before Eurovision ==
=== National final ===
GPB opened a public submission from 22 January 2009 until 5 February 2009. 25 entries were received by the submission deadline and an expert commission selected the top ten songs from the received submissions, which were announced on 13 February 2009 and presented to the public via a special programme on 18 February 2009 at the GPB studios in Tbilisi, hosted by Nika Lomidze and broadcast on the GPB First Channel as well as online at the broadcaster's website 1tv.ge. The winner, "We Don't Wanna Put In" performed by Stephane and 3G, was determined upon by the combination of the votes of an expert jury (70%) and a public televote (30%). The jury consisted of Stephen Budd (British producer), Zaza Shengelia (music manager), Nika Memanishvili (composer), Mamuka Megrelishvili (music producer of the GPB First Channel), Nino Katamadze (singer), Kakha Kandelaki (marketing director of Eastern Promotions) and Gia Chanturia (deputy general director of the GPB First Channel). In addition to the performances of the competing entries, Bzikebi who won Junior Eurovision for Georgia in 2008 performed as a guest.

Final – 18 February 2009
R/O	Artist	Song	Songwriter(s)	Place
1	Bachi Kitiashvili and Bermukha	"Khvalindeli dghe" (ხვალინდელი დღე)	Bachi Kitiashvili	—
2	November	"Over"	Davit Mchedlishvili, Giorgi Mukhigulashvili	—
3	Giorgi Maisuradze	"Peace in the World"	Giorgi Maisuradze, Dato Ugrekhelidze, Lika Kakiashvili	—
4	Tika Patsatsia	"Miracle"	Georgios Kalpakidis	—
5	Tony and Friends	"Hear My Plea"	Tony O'Malley	—
6	Nodiko Tatishvili	"No Sun When You Are Near"	Levan Jibladze, Bibi Kvachadze	—
7	Boris Bedia	"Dagvipharavs ghmerti" (დაგვიფარავს ღმერთი)	Merab Mamulashvili, Manana Gurgenidze	3
8	Stephane and 3G	"We Don't Wanna Put In"	Stephane Mgebrishvili, Bibi Kvachadze	1
9	Anri Jokhadze	"I"	Anri Jokhadze, Bibi Kvachadze	—
10	Keti Orjonikidze	"Hang Out"	Bachi Kitiashvili	2

== Song controversy and withdrawal ==
The 2009 Georgian entry garnered international media exposure due to political connotations in its lyrics of the song "We Don't Wanna Put In". It was also reported that the song was ineligible to compete due to the EBU rules forbidding "lyrics, speeches, gestures of a political or similar nature". Stephane and 3G's accented pronunciation of the words "put in" were noted as resembling the pronunciation of the surname of Russian prime minister Vladimir Putin, and in the context of the previous year's 2008 South Ossetia war the song's lyrics were considered by some as a slight against Russia and Putin. GPB denied that the song was of a political nature, while the EBU refused to make a statement until the song was officially submitted to them. On 2 March, a protest against the song, organised by the Young Russia political group, was held in Moscow, Russia.

After "We Don't Wanna Put In" had been submitted to the EBU, on 10 March, GPB was requested to either re-write the lyrics of the song or select a new entry after it was deemed that the song's lyrics did not comply with the rules of the contest regarding political connotations. On 11 March, the broadcaster announced Georgia's withdrawal from the contest after they refused to change the song lyrics, claiming the EBU was "under unprecedented Russian pressure". The country's withdrawal was confirmed on 16 March during the running order draw. Georgia was set to perform in the first semi-final, to be held on 12 May 2009.

== See also ==
- Georgia–Russia relations
