= Sofia Nizharadze =

Georgian singer, actor, and songwriter (born 1985)

Sofia Nizharadze სოფო ნიჟარაძე
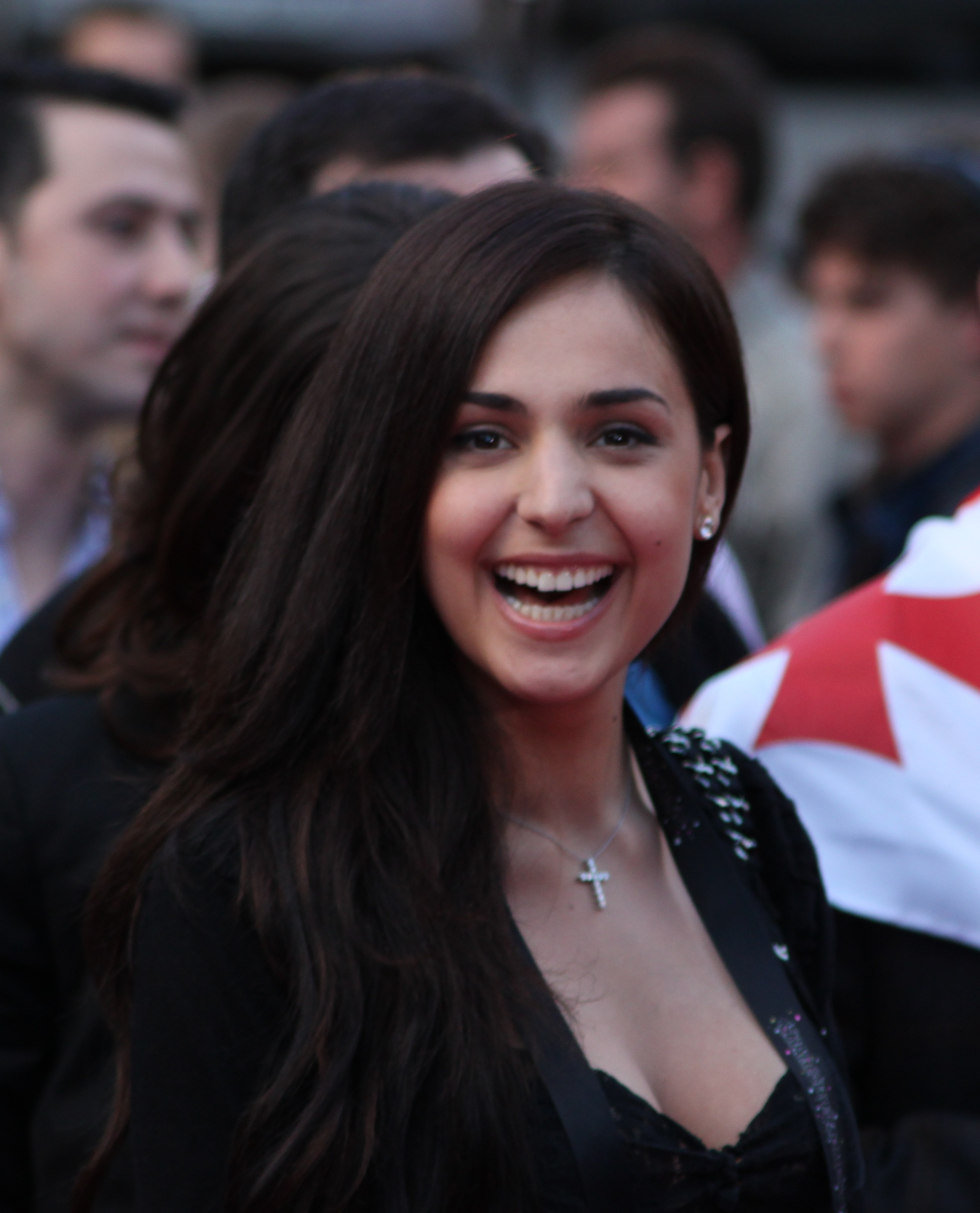
- Sopho Nizharadze in Oslo (2010)

Background information
- Also known as: Sofia
- Born: Sopho Nizharadze; 6 February 1985 (age 41); Tbilisi, Georgian SSR, Soviet Union
- Genres: Pop, soul, R&B
- Occupations: Singer, actress, songwriter
- Instrument: Vocals
- Years active: 1992–present
- Label: Bravo Records

Sopho "Sofia" Nizharadze (Georgian: სოფო ნიჟარაძე, IPA: [sopʰo niʒaɾadze]) is a Georgian singer, actress, and songwriter who represented Georgia in the Eurovision Song Contest 2010 with the song "Shine". Nizharadze was a judge on the TV shows Georgia's Got Talent, Only Georgian and The X Factor Georgia.

== Early life ==
Born in Tbilisi, Georgia in 1985, Nizharadze started singing at a very early age. She graduated with honors from the Musical Academy under the Tbilisi State Conservatory, where she studied piano and vocals. She later continued her studies at the Academy of Theatre and Arts in Russia (GITIS) and graduated with honors from the Gnessin State Musical College in Moscow.

Through her singing she has brought international attention to Georgia.

Nizharadze's great-grandmother, Dürye, was of Turkish origin who immigrated to Tsarist Russia during the Ottoman Empire. She married the son of a Georgian-born professor and then settled in Georgia. In 2010, Nizharadze was reunited with her Turkish relatives on the Beyaz Show during her Eurovision tour in Turkey.

== Music career ==
Nizharadze's vocal range is light lyric soprano.

At the age of three, Nizharadze started performing and found a very positive reception. At age seven she was invited by Jansug Kakhidze, a prominent Georgian conductor and composer of the Georgian cinema, to join a children's music studio where she took the lead as a vocalist for various shows and TV projects.

At age 11, she performed "Sous le ciel de Paris" at the French Embassy in Georgia, where she was noticed by journalist Bernard Pivot, who invited her to his program on TV5.

By age 17 she Nizharadze had won several international young singer's contests, including the "Bravo, Bravissimo!" competition in Mini La Scala (Italy), "Crystal Note" (Moscow, Russia) and "Crystal Fur-tree" (Borjomi, Georgia). She participated in several festivals in Russia, Turkey, Italy, Latvia and Georgia.

Later, she took leading parts in musicals: The Wedding of the Jays and Roméo et Juliette, de la Haine à l'Amour. She was living in Moscow when she started gaining international recognition for her singing.

In 2004, she got a main part in Gerard Presgurvic's musical (Original Russian Version, Operetta Theatre, leading cast). In 2005, she reached the final in the New Wave Festival in Jūrmala, Latvia.

In 2008, Nizharadze gave up her career in Russia and returned to Georgia due to the ongoing war between the two nations.

She performed "The Star-Spangled Banner" during Vice President Joe Biden's official visit to Georgia.

== Eurovision Song Contest 2010 ==
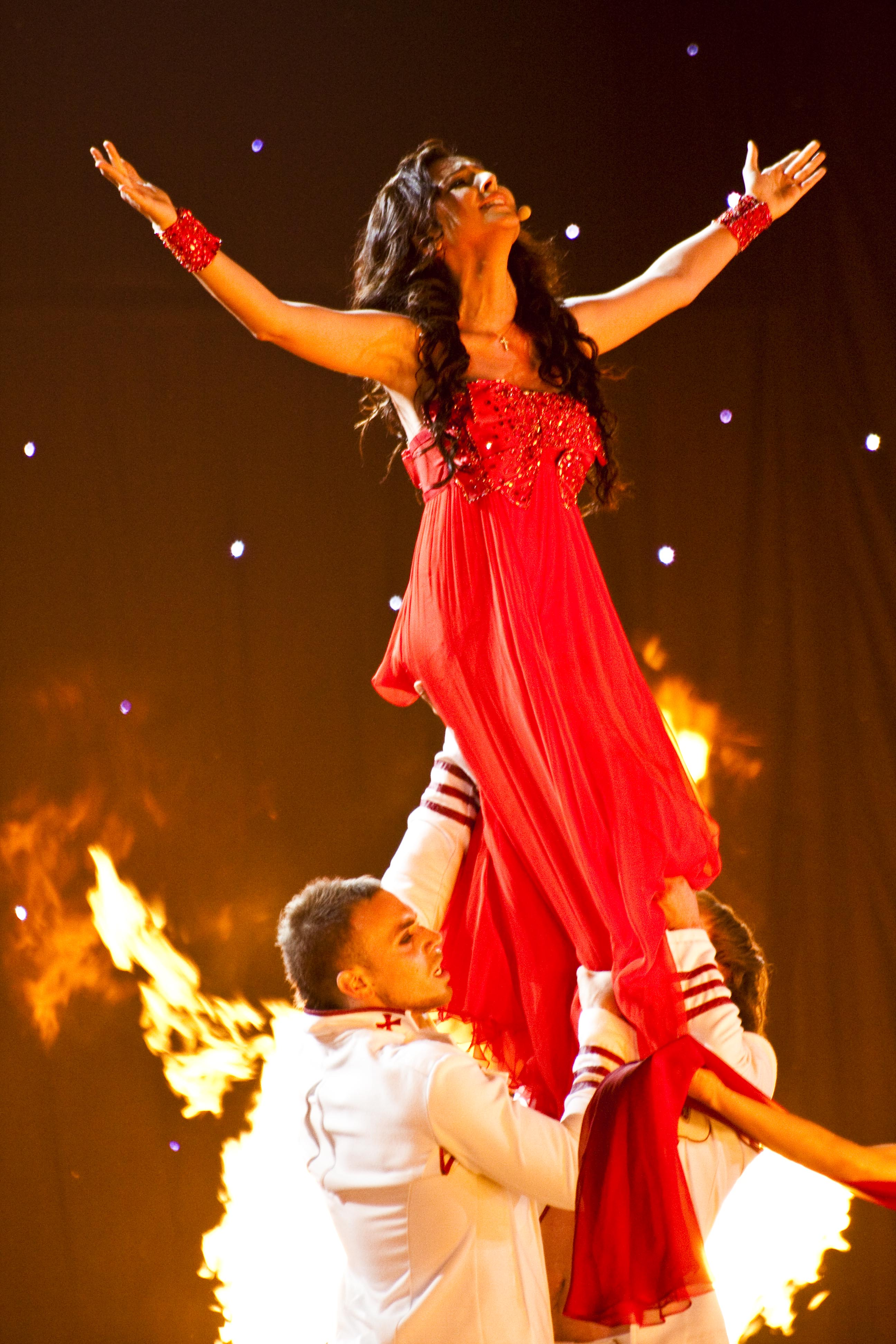
Eurovision 2010 semi-final performance

Nizharadze was chosen by GPB to represent Georgia in the Eurovision Song Contest 2010. An open call for songs was launched, and over 100 entries submitted, the broadcasting authorities selected six, that were all performed by her in a national final on 27 February in the Tbilisi Even Hall. "Shine" was voted as the winner.

== 2010: After Eurovision ==
In celebration of her performance at Eurovision, President of Georgia Mikheil Saakashvili suggested that Nizharadze was being considered for appointment as the nation's Minister of Culture.

Nizharadze performs at events throughout Europe and Asia. She has sung duets with José Carreras, Andrea Bocelli, Chris de Burgh and Julio Iglesias. In 2013 she recorded a single "When We Danced." She released a new album with this single and also with Eurovision Song Contest hit "Shine" in March 2014.

In 2016 she was a judge at the Georgian format of X Factor alongside Nika Gvaramia, Nina Sublatti and Giorgi Gabunia.

== Awards and achievements ==
- 1995: "Crystal fir tree", the international festival nominated at the "Best Vocal" category
- 1996: Special award – "The League", the first Georgian festival; award owner at the festival Mini La Scala
- 1997: participant of "Crystal note" International Festival in Moscow (850 anniversary of Moscow city)
- 1999: Diploma of the First category for the best vocal within the frame of the festival "Pushkin weeks"; Diploma of the Tbilisi Mayor's Office for the "Unique vocal features"
- 1998: 2001- Scholarship of President Eduard Shevardnadze
- 2000: "Golden Star" for the best vocal granted by Forte Cinematographic Studio and Star Scale Studio
- 2003–2004: leading part in the musical The Wedding of the Jays
- 2004–2006: leading part on Roméo et Juliette, de la Haine à l'Amour The Musical
- 2005: participant, a finalist of the young pop star contest at the New Wave Festival
- 2005–2007: leading parts in shows and production of RATI; was invited for Esmeralda part to the Musical Notre Dame De Paris
- 2010: performed a duet with José Carreras, extract from the musical West Side Story
- 2010: performed with Chris De Burgh
- 2011: performed with Andrea Bocelli
- 2012: performed a duet with Julio Iglesias
- 2012–2013: leading role in Redha Bentifour's musical Melodies of Vera District
- 2013: recorded single "When We Danced" and a music video with the participation Joaquin Cortes
- unknown: main role in the first Georgian musical Keto and Kote

== Stage roles ==
- Musical Svadba Soek "The Wedding of the Jays" (Ketevan – main role)
- Musical Romeo & Juliette – Juliet (Original Russian Main Cast)
- Musical Hello, Dolly (RATI)
- Keto and Kote The Musical (Keto – leading role)
- Melodies of Vera District The Musical by Redha Benteifour (Vardo – leading role)

== Albums ==
- The Wedding of the Jays Original Cast Recording (2003)
- Musical Romeo & Juliette "Ot Nenavisti Do Lubvi" Original Cast Recording (2005)
- Where are you... (2008)
  - Track listing:
    1. "My Dream"
    2. "Every Moment"
    3. "Where Are You..."
    4. "Leave Me Alone"
    5. "I'm Running Away"
    6. "Over and Over"
    7. "Leave Me Alone (rmx)"
    8. "Over and Over (rmx)"
- We Are All (2014)
  - Track listing:
    1. "No Way Out"
    2. "Hero"
    3. "Why Won't You Love Me"
    4. "When We Danced"
    5. "We Are All"
    6. "Without Your Love"
    7. "The Reason I Go On"
    8. "Shine"
    9. "So in Love"
    10. "Call Me"
    11. "Without Your Love (Remix)"
    12. "Two of a Kind"

== Personal life ==
On 31 December 2021, Mikheil Saakashvili recognized to have an extramarital daughter, Alice Maria, with Sofia Nizharadze, calling her "my most lovely girl and youngest child".

Awards and achievements
Preceded by Diana Gurtskaya with "Peace Will Come"	Georgia in the Eurovision Song Contest; 2010	Succeeded by Eldrine with "One More Day"
