= Eldrine =

Georgian nu metal band

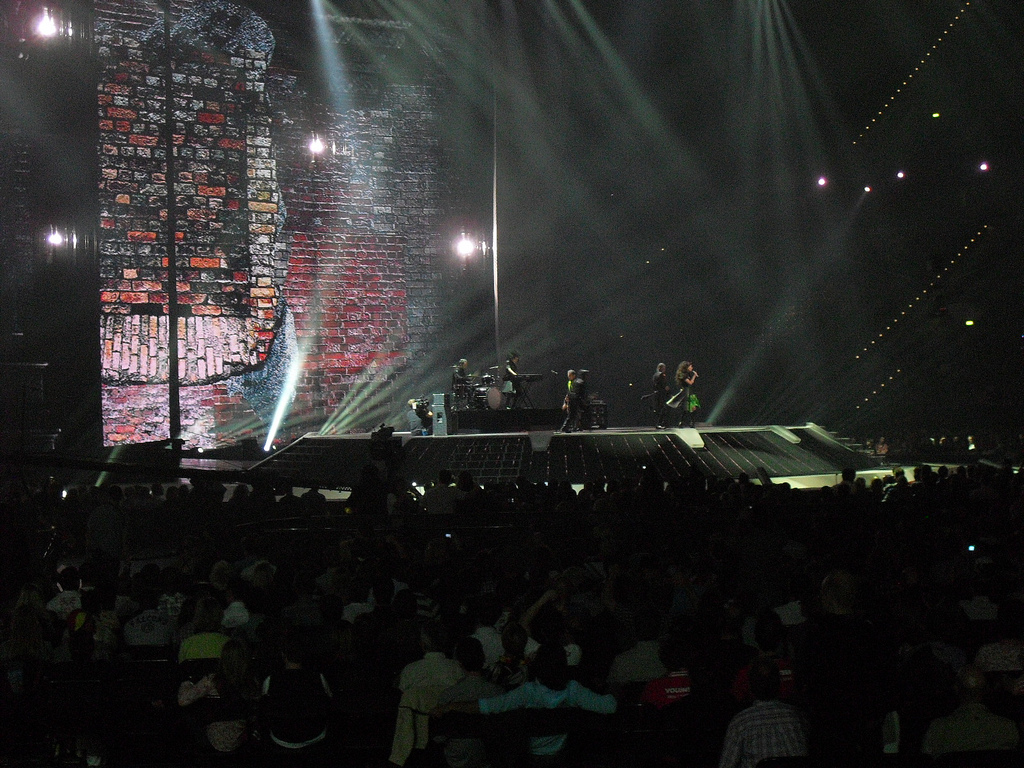
- Eldrine performing at Eurovision

Background information
- Origin: Georgia
- Genres: Nu metal
- Years active: 2007–present
- Members: Mikheil Chelidze; Irakli Bibilashvili; David Changoshvili; Sophio Toroshelidze; Beso Tsikhelashvili
- Past members: Tamar Shekiladze; Mariam Tomaradze; Tamar Vadachkoria
- Website: www.eldrine.ge

Eldrine (/ɔːlˈdraɪn/, all-DRINE; stylised as ƎLDRINE and also known as Eldraini) is a Georgian nu metal band that represented Georgia in the Eurovision Song Contest 2011 with the song "One More Day". The current line-up consists of 6 band members: Mariam Tomaradze who replaced Sophio Toroshelidze, Mikheil Chelidze, Irakli Bibilashvili, David Changoshvili, Tamar Shekiladze and Beso Tsikhelashvili. To date, they have released one studio album, entitled Fake Reality. It was released in January 2011, and a re-issued version is planned for release with the inclusion of "One More Day".

== Eurovision Song Contest 2011 ==
Eldrine entered and won a national telecast vote to represent Georgia in the 2011 Eurovision Song Contest, in Düsseldorf, Germany. Just a few days later, it was announced that Sopho Toroshelidze had replaced the band's original singer Tamar Vadachkoria, due to contractual issues. Eldrine competed into the first semi-final and were drawn as the 9th act to perform. They finished 6th in the voting, and thus qualified for the final, where they performed last and finished in 9th place with 110 points, receiving 12 points from Lithuania, Ukraine and Belarus.

== Band members ==
Current members

- Sophio Toroshelidze (Sopho) – Lead vocals (2011–present)
- Mikheil Chelidze (Miken) – Lead guitar, backing vocals (2007–present)
- Beso Tsikhelashvili (DJ BE$$) – Rhythm guitar, turntables, backing vocals (2007–present)
- Irakli Bibilashvili (Bibo) – Bass guitar (2007–present)
- David Changoshvili (Chango) – Drums (2007–present)

Former members

- Tamar Vadachkoria (Tako) – Lead vocals (2007–2011)
- Tamar Shekiladze (Tamta) – Keyboards, backing vocals (2007–2012)
- Mariam Tomaradze (Mari) - Lead vocals (2012)

== Discography ==
Albums

- Fake Reality (3-Track Demo) (2011)
- Till The End (2014)

Singles

- "Haunting" (2010)
- "One More Day" (2011)
- "Addiction" (2015)

Awards and achievements
Preceded by Sopho Nizharadze with "Shine"	Georgia in the Eurovision Song Contest; 2011	Succeeded by Anri Jokhadze with "I'm a Joker"
