= Geostar =

- Logo of Geostar 2008
- Created by: Simon Fuller
- Country of origin: Georgia

Original release
- Network: Rustavi 2
- Release: 2006 – 31 December 2011

Geostari (Georgian: ჯეოსტარი) is the Georgian franchise of the Idol series, which airs on Rustavi 2. Georgia is the fifth former Soviet country to have acquired an Idol franchise after Armenia, Estonia, Kazakhstan, and Russia.

== History ==
The series began on 2006 as an Idol spin-off, but it is only in its third season in 2008 that it has enable to acquire a license from FremantleMedia, owner of the Idol franchise which resulted in a change of the rules following the same format as other Idol shows were only the viewers decide upon the verdict of the contestants. Former seasons have seen the judges saving one of the bottom two contestants with their Power of Veto at the end of each episode.

The sixth season started in October 2010 and ended 31 December 2011. After six seasons known as Geostari, the program was to be redeveloped in 2012 by Rustavi 2 to the new title of საქართველოს ვარსკვლავი or Sakartvelos Varskvlavi (Georgian Idol) was to premiere in September however was delayed due to the 2012 Georgian protests. The program eventually returned in 2019 and was used to select the Georgian representative for the Eurovision Song Contest.

== Contestants ==
Giorgi Sukhitashvili won the third season making him the first male contestant to win the show following the two women Tiko Chulukhadze and Ani Kekua. It is therefore also the first former Soviet country which saw victory for both genders in its Idol adaptation whereas Narodniy Artist (Russia) and SuperStar KZ (Kazakhstan) only had male winners and Hay Superstar (Armenia) and Eesti otsib superstaari (Estonia) only had females.

== Hosts and Judges ==
=== Season 4 ===
Hosts

- Duta Skhirtladze
- Anano Mjhavia

Judges

- Marina Beridze
- Levan Tsuladze
- Buba Kikabidze

== Bottom three Statistics ==
=== Season 3 ===
Theme	Bottom Three		
19 October	Ana Kurtubadze	Salome Bakuradze	Giorgi Sukhitashvili
26 October	Teona Niazashvili	Giorgi Sukhitashvili (2)	Nini Tsiklauri
1 November	Mari Asatiani		
8 November	Rati Navadze		
15 November	Eko Amqoladze		
22 November	Giorgi Makharashvili		
29 November	Nini Tsiklauri		
6 December	Tamuna Mikeladze		
13 December	Irina Bairamashvili		
20 December	Boris Bedia		

== Elimination chart ==
=== Season 3 ===
Legend
Did Not Perform	Female	Male	Semi	Finalists	Winner

Safe	First Save	Second Save	Last Save	Eliminated

Stage:		Semi	Finals										
Week:		10/12	10/19	10/26	11/01	11/08	11/15	11/22	11/29	12/06	12/13	12/20	12/27
Place	Contestants	Results											
1	Giorgi Sukhitashvili		Btm 3	Btm 2				Btm 3					Winner
2	Salome Bakuradze		Btm 2				Btm 3						Runner-up
3	Boris Bedia											Elim	
4	Irina Bairamashvili					Btm 2					Elim		
5	Tamuna Mikeladze						Btm 2	Btm 2		Elim			
6	Nini Tsiklauri	Adv		Btm 3		Btm 3			Elim				
7	Giorgi Makharashvili							Elim					
8	Eko Amqoladze						Elim						
9	Rati Navadze					Elim							
10	Mari Asatiani				Elim								
11	Teona Niazashvili			Elim									
12	Ana Kurtubadze		Elim										
Semi	Tornike Beroshvili	Elim											
Semi	Natalia Gogitidze	Elim											

=== Season 4 ===
Stage:		Semi	Finals										
Week:		10/12	10/19	10/26	11/02	11/09	11/16	11/23	11/30	12/07	12/14	12/21	12/31
Place	Contestants	Results											
1	Nodiko Tatishvili						Btm 3			Btm 3	Btm 2	Btm 2	Winner
2	Vajha Mania							Btm 3					Runner-up
3	Datuna Mgeladze								Btm 3		Btm 3	Elim	
4	Sopo Bedia					Btm 3				Btm 2	Elim		
5	Shota Legashvili								Btm 2	Elim			
6	Nini Sukhitashvili		Btm 3			Btm 2		Btm 2	Elim				
7	Nino Basharuli		Btm 3				Btm 2	Elim					
8	Mamuka Gorgiladze			Btm 3			Elim						
9	Maka Sirbiladze			Btm 3		Elim							
10	Giorgi Tskhvariashvili	Adv			Elim								
11	Gvantsa Kachkachishvili			Elim									
12	Mariam liklikadze		Elim										
Semi	Irakli Maruashvili	Elim											
Semi	Giorgi Kobaidze	Elim											

=== Season 5 ===
Stage:		Semi	Finals										
Week:		10/11	10/18	10/25	11/01	11/08	11/15	11/22	11/29	12/06	12/13	12/20	12/27
Place	Contestants	Results											
1	Otar Nemsadze											Btm 2	Winner
2	Sopho Gelovani						Btm 3	Btm 2	Btm 2		Btm 2		Runner-Up
3	Iago Devadze									Btm 3	Btm 3	Elim	
4	Indira Gerenaia				Btm 3		Elim	Btm 3	Btm 3	Btm 2	Elim		
5	Natia Dumbadze	Adv			Btm 2		Btm 2		Elim	Elim			
6	Ani Siradze								WD				
7	Zura Mosiava			Btm 3		Btm 2		Elim					
8	Levan Kbilashvili					Btm 3	WD						
9	Ana Mdivnishvili		Btm 3			Elim							
10	Merab Nutsubidze			Btm 2	Elim								
11	Lasha Tolordava		Btm 2	Elim									
12	Salome Kalandadze		Elim										
Semi	Eka Skhirtladze	Elim											
Semi	Ninisha Metreveli	Elim											

- Levan Kbilashvili quit the show after a car accident. Therefore, Indira Gerenaia, who was voted off the last in the competition, was brought back as the replacement. The producers decided to give a second chance to Levan in the next season
- Ani Siradze quit the show by her own decision. Therefore, Natia Dumadze, who was voted off the last in the competition, was brought back as the replacement.

=== Season 6 ===
Stage:		Semi	Finals										
Week:		10/10	10/17	10/24	10/31	11/07	11/14	11/21	11/28	12/05	12/12	12/19	12/31
Place	Contestants	Results											
1	Marita Rokhvadze		Btm 3			Btm 2							Winner
2	Levan Kbilashvili						Btm 3	Btm 2		Btm 3	Btm 3	Btm 2	Runner-Up
3	Mari Jomardidze								Btm 2	Btm 2	Btm 2	Elim	
4	Giorgi Gogishvili					Btm 3		Btm 3			Elim		
5	Andria Gvelesiani			Btm 2	Btm 2				Btm 3	Elim			
6	Moris Meladze	Adv					Btm 2		Elim				
7	Niko Beridze		Btm 2					Elim					
8	David Londaridze			Btm 3	Btm 3		Elim						
9	Tekla Kalmakhelidze					Elim							
10	Khatia Esitashvili				Elim								
11	Mariam Pavliashvili			Elim									
12	Gio Maglaperidze		Elim										
Semi	Nikoloz Guraspashvili	Elim											
Semi	Irakli Churghulia	Elim											

== See also ==
- Nina Sublatti
