= Nina Sublatti discography =

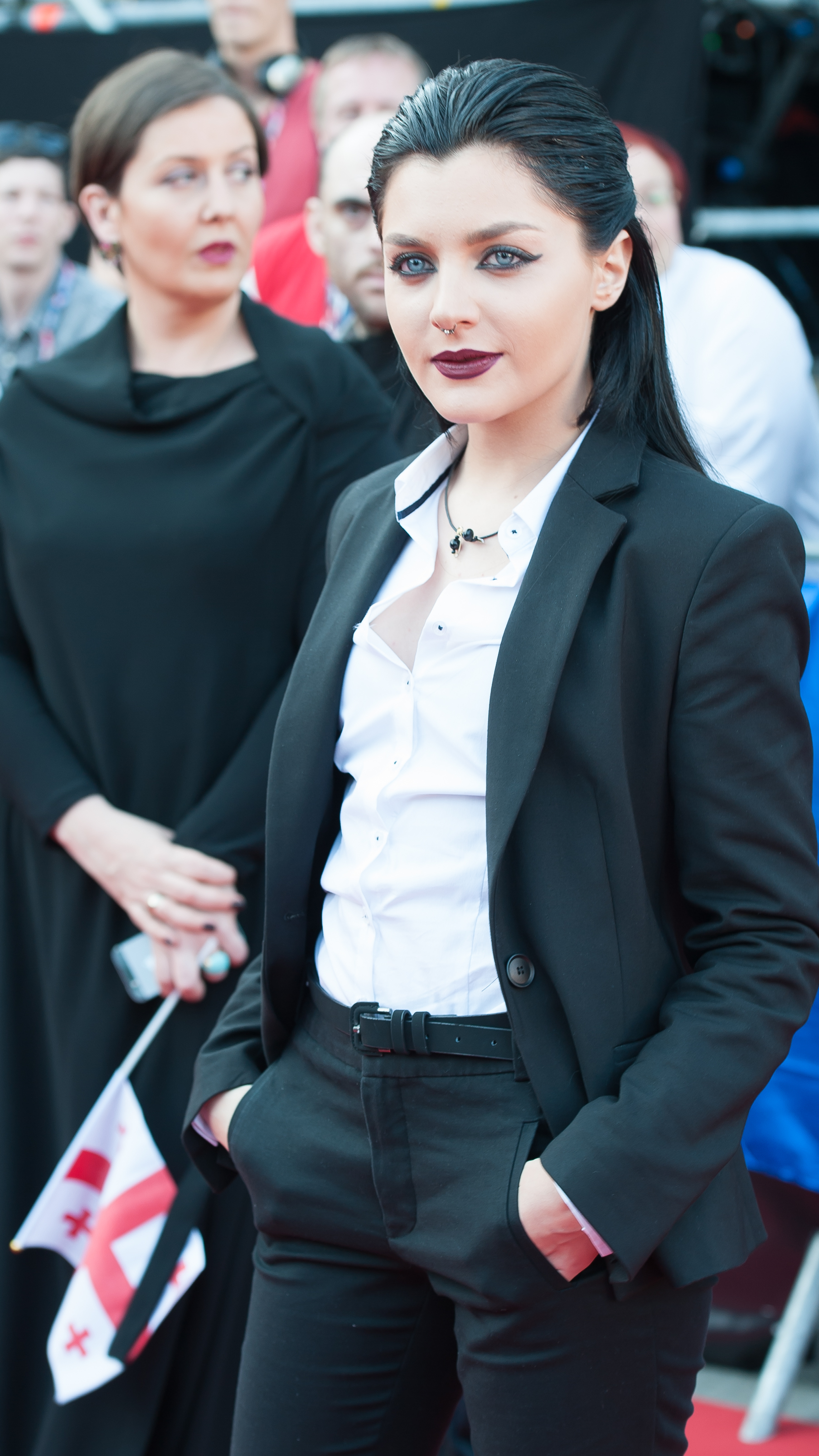
- Sublatti at the opening ceremony of the Eurovision Song Contest 2015 in Vienna
- Studio albums: 1
- EPs: 1
- Music videos: 4

Georgian singer and songwriter Nina Sublatti has released one studio album, one extended play, eight singles, and four music videos.

== Albums ==
=== Studio albums ===
List of albums, with selected chart positions and certifications
Title	Album details	Peak chart positions					
Title	Album details	AUT	POL	UKR	ISL	TUR	RUS
Dare to Be Nina Sublatti	Released: 12 June 2014; Formats: CD, digital download, online streaming; Label: Bravo Records	—	—	—	—	—	—
"—" denotes releases that did not chart or were not released in that territory.

== Extended plays ==
List of EPs, with selected chart positions and certifications
Title	EP details	Peak chart positions					
Title	EP details	AUT	POL	UKR	ISL	TUR	RUS
Locked Box	Released: 27 July 2015; Format: Digital download; Label: Bravo Records	—	—	—	—	—	—
"—" denotes releases that did not chart or were not released in that territory.

== Singles ==
Title	Year	Peak chart positions						Album
Title	Year	AUT	POL	UKR	ISL	TUR	RUS	Album
"Down" (featuring Nini Tsnobiladze)	2014	—	—	—	—	—	—	Non-album singles
"Sleep"	2015	—	—	—	—	—	—	Non-album singles
"I've Got An Idea"	2015	—	95	112	—	14	95	Locked Box
"Warrior"	2015	73	69	40	44	2	29	Non-album single
"Locked Box"	2015	—	—	—	—	—	146	Locked Box
"You Call Me Devil"	2015	—	—	91	—	30	72	Locked Box
"Heart Won't Suck It"	2015	—	—	—	—	—	179	Non-album singles
"Dark Desire"	2015	—	—	—	—	—	—	Non-album singles
"Vision of Mind"	2016	—	—	183	—	—	220	Non-album singles
"Home"	2017	—	—	—	—	—	—	Non-album singles
"Maybe This Day"	2021	—	—	—	—	—	—	Non-album singles
"Roses"	2022	—	—	—	—	—	—	Non-album singles
"For My Friend"	2022	—	—	—	—	—	—	Non-album singles
"Light"	2024	—	—	—	—	—	—	Non-album singles

== Music videos ==
Year	Title	Director
2014	"Toxic" (featuring Lasha Kicks)	David Gogokhia
2015	"Warrior"	David Gogokhia
2015	"I’ve Got An Idea"	David Gogokhia
2015	"Dark Desire"	David Gogokhia
