= Nika Kocharov =

Georgian musician (born 1980)

Nika Kocharov ნიკა კოჩაროვი
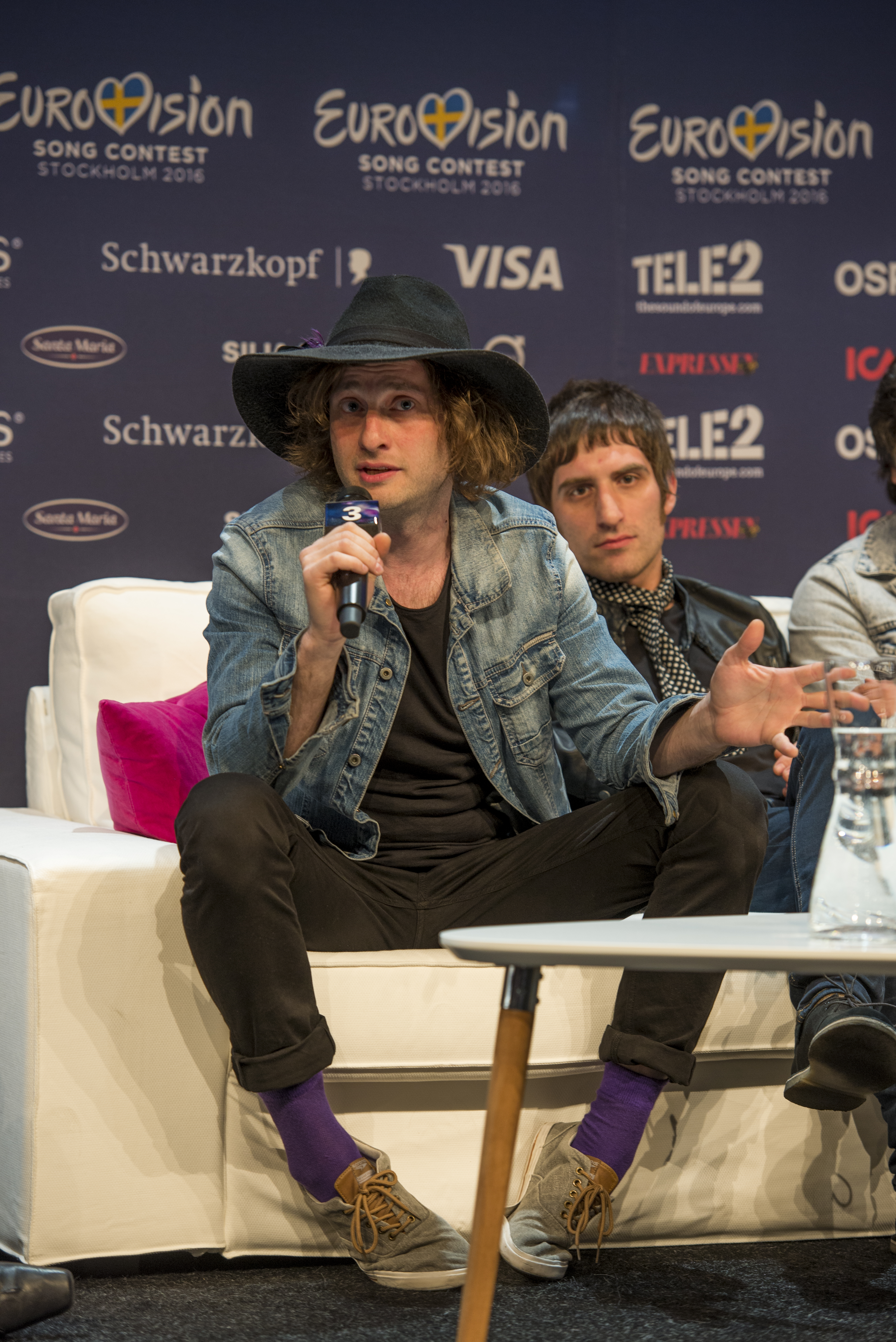
- Kocharov (left) in 2016.
- Born: Nikoloz Valerieovich Kocharov; June 22, 1980 (age 46); Tbilisi, Georgian SSR, Soviet Union (now Georgia)
- Other name: Igor Von Lichtenstein
- Occupations: Singer; songwriter; composer; musician; actor
- Musical career
- Genres: Alternative rock, indie rock, progressive rock
- Instruments: Vocals; guitar; drums; keyboard
- Years active: 1995–present
- Labels: 4 Real Records; Stockton Records
- Member of: Circus Mircus; Young Georgian Lolitaz; Z for Zulu

Nikoloz Valerieovich Kocharov (Georgian: ნიკოლოზ ვალერიოვიჩი კოჩაროვი), known as Nika Kocharov (Georgian: ნიკა კოჩაროვი) is a Georgian singer-songwriter, composer, musician and actor who is part of progressive rock band Circus Mircus, who represented Georgia in the Eurovision Song Contest 2022. He was also the frontman of indie rock band Young Georgian Lolitaz, who represented Georgia in the Eurovision Song Contest 2016. He is the son of a Georgian musician Valeri Kocharov.

== Career ==
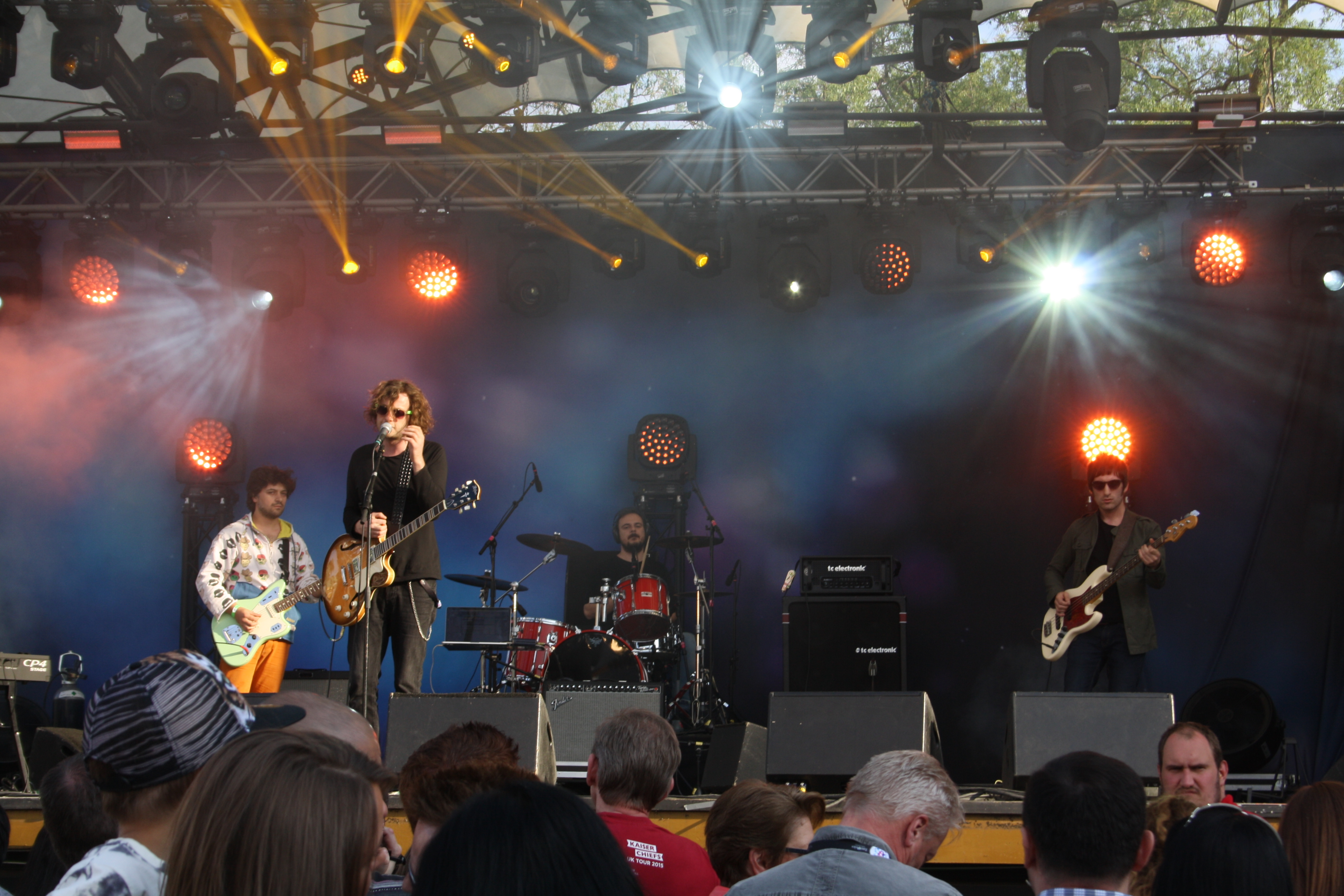
Kocharov (second from left) performing as part of Young Georgian Lolitaz at the ESC Village at the Eurovision Song Contest 2016.

Kocharov was born in 1980 in Tbilisi, Georgia. He started his musical career aged 15 when he formed his first band, Nagvis Khe Georgian for Garbage Tree. Aged 19, he started another band, Nebo CCCR, with Kote Kalandadze. In 2001, he formed Young Georgian Lolitaz. In 2006, he moved to London when he was signed by 4 Real Records. From 2002–present, he has composed the music for three films and one television series, and starred in three films.

In 2016, he represented Georgia in the Eurovision Song Contest 2016 with Young Georgian Lolitaz with the song Midnight Gold, finishing 20th in the final with 104 points. He was the spokesperson for Georgia in the 2017 contest.

In late 2025, Kocharov released his first solo album to streaming services, Morning Terror, through Leno Records, described as the beginning of a plan to bring decades' of unreleased material to light.

=== Circus Mircus ===
According to Wiwibloggs, Kocharov was rumoured to be part of Circus Mircus, who represented Georgia in the Eurovision Song Contest 2022. Kocharov, along with other members of Young Georgian Lolitaz, have been listed in credits of Circus Mircus songs, and media noticed similarities in looks between Kocharov and Igor von Lichtenstein of Circus Mircus.

Following Eurovision, Kocharov was confirmed as Igor von Lichtenstein, a member of the band.

== Personal life ==
Kocharov is in a relationship with 1TV presenter Lika Evgenidze, and their first child was born in 2024.

== Discography ==
=== Albums ===
Title	Details
Morning Terror	Released: 9 December 2025; Label: Leno Records

=== Extended plays ===
Title	Details
Blankets	Released: 26 January 2026; Label: Leno Records

=== Singles ===
Title	Year	Writer(s)	Ref.
"Trivial Truths"	2020	Nika Kocharov	
"Friend" (featuring Gogi Dzodzuashvili)	2023	Nika Kocharov, Gogi Dzodzuashvili	
"Sirock" (featuring Young Georgian Lolitaz)	2023	Valeri Kocharov	
"Demo Days EP.1" (with Qaji Todia)	2025	Nikoloz Kocharov, Davit Jikia	

=== As featured artist ===
Title	Year	Writer(s)	Ref.
"River (Nika Kocharov Remix)" (by George Sikharulidze)	2021	George Sikharulidze, Nika Kocharov	
"99.99% Happy" (Gogi Dzodzuashvili featuring Nika Kocharov)	2023	Gogi Dzodzuashvili, Nika Kocharov	

=== Young Georgian Lolitaz ===
==== Studio albums ====
Title	Details	Ref.
"Lemonjuice"	Released: December 28, 2009	

==== Extended plays ====
Title	Details	Ref.
"The Lava EP"	Released: June 7, 2010	

==== Singles ====
Title	Year	Writer(s)	Ref.
"Midnight Gold"	2016	Kote Kalandadze; Thomas G:son	(Note: "Midnight Gold" was removed from streaming services.)
"Dark Device"	2017	Young Georgian Lolitaz	

== Filmography ==
=== As a composer ===
Year	Title	Role	Notes	Ref.
2002	Post Punk	Composer		
2009	Tbilisuri Love Story	Composer		
2015-2017	Mzareulebi	Composer		
2019	The Criminal Man	Composer		

=== As an actor ===
Year	Title	Role	Notes	Ref.
2002	Listen to Chopin	Yellow Duck singer		
2013	Ra Mokhda Kievshi	Tombstone maker		
2022	In Bax	The Rock N Rolla Friend		

== Awards ==
Year	Award/Festival	Category	Work	Result	Ref
2019	Minsk International Film Festival (Listapad)	Best Sound/Score	The Criminal Man	Won	

== Notes ==
Awards and achievements
Preceded by Nina Sublatti with "Warrior"	Georgia in the Eurovision Song Contest with Young Georgian Lolitaz; 2016	Succeeded by Tamara Gachechiladze with "Keep the Faith"
