= Georgia in the Eurovision Song Contest 2017 =

- Eurovision Song Contest 2017
- Participating broadcaster: Georgian Public Broadcaster (GPB)
- Country: Georgia
- Selection process: Evroviizis erovnul konkurss
- Selection date: 20 January 2017

Competing entry
- Song: "Keep the Faith"
- Artist: Tamara Gachechiladze
- Songwriters: Anri Jokhadze; Tamara Gachechiladze

Placement
- Semi-final result: Failed to qualify (11th)

Participation chronology

Georgia was represented at the Eurovision Song Contest 2017 with the song "Keep the Faith" written by Anri Jokhadze and Tamara Gachechiladze. The song was performed by Tamara Gachechiladze, who was due to represent Georgia in the Eurovision Song Contest 2009 as part of Stephane and 3G with the song "We Don't Wanna Put In" before the nation's withdrawal in protest of the Russo-Georgian War. Songwriter Anri Jokhadze represented Georgia in the 2012 contest where he failed to qualify to the final with the song "I'm a Joker". The Georgian broadcaster Georgian Public Broadcaster (GPB) held a national final in order to select the Georgian entry for the 2017 contest in Kyiv, Ukraine. An open call for submissions was held which resulted in the submission of twenty-five entries that were presented to the public during a televised production on 20 January 2017. The results of a public televote combined with the votes of an international jury resulted in the selection of "Keep the Faith" performed by Tamara Gachechiladze as the Georgian entry.

Georgia was drawn to compete in the first semi-final of the Eurovision Song Contest which took place on 9 May 2017. Performing during the show in position 2, "Keep the Faith" was not announced among the top 10 entries of the second semi-final and therefore did not qualify to compete in the final. It was later revealed that Georgia placed eleventh out of the 18 participating countries in the semi-final with 99 points.

== Background ==
Prior to the 2017 contest, Georgia had participated in the Eurovision Song Contest nine times since their first entry in 2007. The nation's highest placing in the contest, to this point, has been ninth place, which was achieved on two occasions: in 2010 with the song "Shine" performed by Sofia Nizharadze and in 2011 with the song "One More Day" performed by Eldrine. The nation briefly withdrew from the contest in 2009 after the European Broadcasting Union (EBU) rejected the Georgian entry, "We Don't Wanna Put In", for perceived political references to Vladimir Putin who was the Russian Prime Minister at the time. The withdrawal and fallout was tied to tense relations between Georgia and then host country Russia, which stemmed from the 2008 Russo-Georgian War. Following the introduction of semi-finals, Georgia has, to this point, failed to qualify to the final on only two occasions. In 2016, Georgia qualified to the final where the country placed 20th with the song "Midnight Gold" performed by Nika Kocharov and Young Georgian Lolitaz.

The Georgian national broadcaster, Georgian Public Broadcaster (GPB), broadcasts the event within Georgia and organises the selection process for the nation's entry. GPB confirmed their intentions to participate at the 2017 Eurovision Song Contest on 3 October 2016. Georgia has selected their entry for the Eurovision Song Contest both through national finals and internal selections in the past. In 2016, GPB opted to internally select the Georgian artist while the song was chosen in a national final. For their 2017 participation, both the artist and song was selected via a national final.

== Before Eurovision ==
=== Evroviizis erovnuli konkursi ===
GPB opened a public submission from 7 November 2016 until 7 December 2016. 28 entries were received by the submission deadline, of which three were later withdrawn. The 25 entries were presented to the public via a special programme on 20 January 2017 at the Philharmonic Hall in Tbilisi, hosted by 2013 Georgian Eurovision entrant Nodiko Tatishvili and Liza Tsiklauri and broadcast on the GPB First Channel as well as online at the broadcaster's website 1tv.ge. The winner, "Keep the Faith" performed by Tako Gachechiladze, was determined upon by the combination of the votes of an international jury (80%) and a public televote (20%). The international jury consisted of Tali Eshkoli (television director), Ralf Reinink (journalist), Sacha Jean-Baptiste (staging director) and Borislav Milanov (composer and producer).

R/O	Artist	Song	Songwriter(s)	Jury	Televote	Total	Place
1	Giorgi Chikovani	"Make It Right"	Giorgi Chikovani	76	3	79	7
2	Brandon Stone, Eteri Beriashvili and Vahtang	"Heyo Song"	Brandon Stone	43	4	47	18
3	Rati Durglishvili	"Why"	Rati Durglishvili	32	13	45	21
4	Andria Gvelesiani	"Revolutionise"	Giorgi Laghidze	58	12	70	10
5	Alisa Danelia	"We Are Eternity"	Alisa Danelia	47	1	48	17
6	Nutsa Buzaladze	"White Horses Run"	Andy Vitolo, John King	89	18	107	2
7	Maliibu	"We Live Once"	Malibu Tugushi	95	10	105	3
8	Eos	"Urban Signs"	Giorgi Kochoradze, Gedevan Levlishvili	16	7	23	25
9	Dima Kobeshavidze	"Scream"	Dima Kobeshavidze	53	2	55	14
10	Trio Mandili	"Me da shen" (მე და შენ)	Vadim Estreman, Rostislav Maslovich	60	5	65	12
11	Tako Gachechiladze	"Keep the Faith"	Anri Jokhadze, Tamara Gachechiladze	98	24	122	1
12	Nino Basharuli	"Lileo" (ლილეო)	Nino Basharuli	52	20	72	9
13	Elene Mikiashvili	"Fighter"	Ylva Persson, Linda Persson, Will Taylor	44	11	55	14
14	Misha Sulukhia	"Magic"	Misha Sulukhia	49	14	63	13
15	Mariko Lezhava	"Light It Up"	Boris Skhiani, Gigi Bezhanishvili	66	16	82	6
16	The Mins	"Crime"	Zviad Mghebrishvili	83	22	105	3
17	Sparkle	"On the Top"	Aleko Berdzenishvili, Mariko Lezhava	54	23	77	8
18	Tornike Kipiani and Giorgi Bolotashvili	"You Are My Sunshine"	Tornike Kipiani	26	9	35	23
19	Temo Sajaia	"All the Same"	Temo Sajaia	48	6	54	16
20	Sabina Chantouria	"Stranger"	Sabina Chantouria	39	8	47	18
21	Mariam Chachkhiani	"Fly"	Joni Titirashvili	68	15	83	5
22	Asea Sool	"Nature"	Asea Sool	25	21	46	20
23	Nanuka Giorgobiani	"Let the Sunshine In"	Edisher Lomadze	17	17	34	24
24	Oto Nemsadze and Group Limbo	"Dear God"	Beso Nemsadze	45	25	70	10
25	Davit Shanidze	"Mtveris katsi" (მტვერის კაცი)	Davit Shanidze	17	19	36	22

=== Promotion ===
Tamara Gachechiladze made several appearances across Europe to specifically promote "Keep the Faith" as the Georgian Eurovision entry. On 4 February, Tamara Gachechiladze performed "Keep the Faith" during the first semi-final of the Ukrainian Eurovision national final. Between 3 and 6 April, Gachechiladze took part in promotional activities in Tel Aviv, Israel where she performed during the Israel Calling event held at the Ha'teatron venue. On 8 April, she performed during the Eurovision in Concert event which was held at the Melkweg venue in Amsterdam, Netherlands and hosted by Cornald Maas and Selma Björnsdóttir. On 15 April, Tamara Gachechiladze performed during the Eurovision Spain Pre-Party, which was held at the Sala La Riviera venue in Madrid, Spain.

== At Eurovision ==
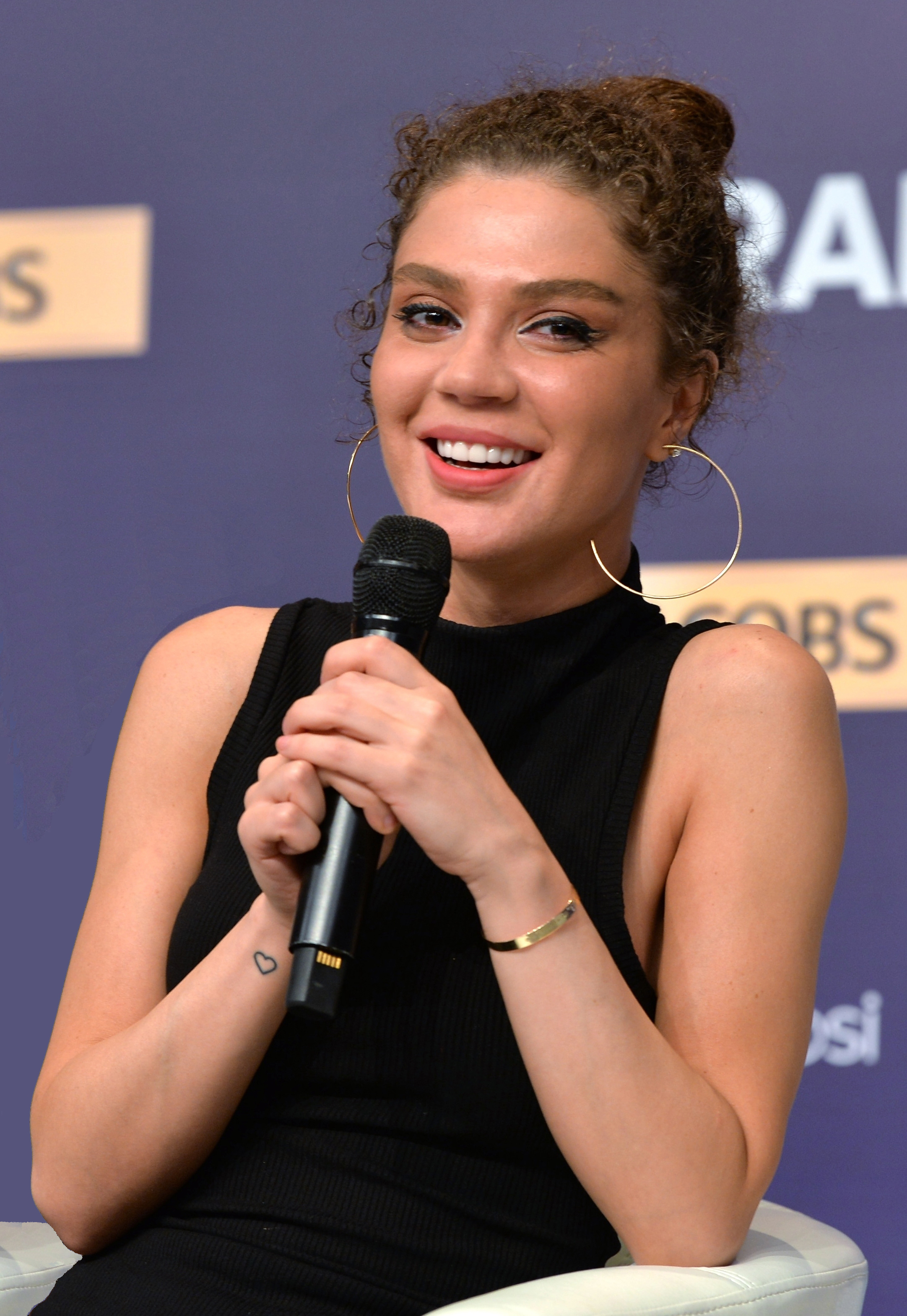
Tamara Gachechiladze during a press meet and greet

According to Eurovision rules, all nations with the exceptions of the host country and the "Big Five" (France, Germany, Italy, Spain and the United Kingdom) are required to qualify from one of two semi-finals in order to compete for the final; the top ten countries from each semi-final progress to the final. The European Broadcasting Union (EBU) split up the competing countries into six different pots based on voting patterns from previous contests, with countries with favourable voting histories put into the same pot. On 31 January 2017, a special allocation draw was held which placed each country into one of the two semi-finals, as well as which half of the show they would perform in. Georgia was placed into the first semi-final, to be held on 9 May 2017, and was scheduled to perform in the first half of the show.

Once all the competing songs for the 2017 contest had been released, the running order for the semi-finals was decided by the shows' producers rather than through another draw, so that similar songs were not placed next to each other. Georgia was set to perform in position 2, following the entry from Sweden and before the entry from Australia.

The two semi-finals and the final were broadcast in Georgia on GPB First Channel with commentary by Demetre Ergemlidze. The Georgian spokesperson, who announced the top 12-point score awarded by the Georgian jury during the final, was 2016 Georgian Eurovision entrant Nika Kocharov.

=== Semi-final ===
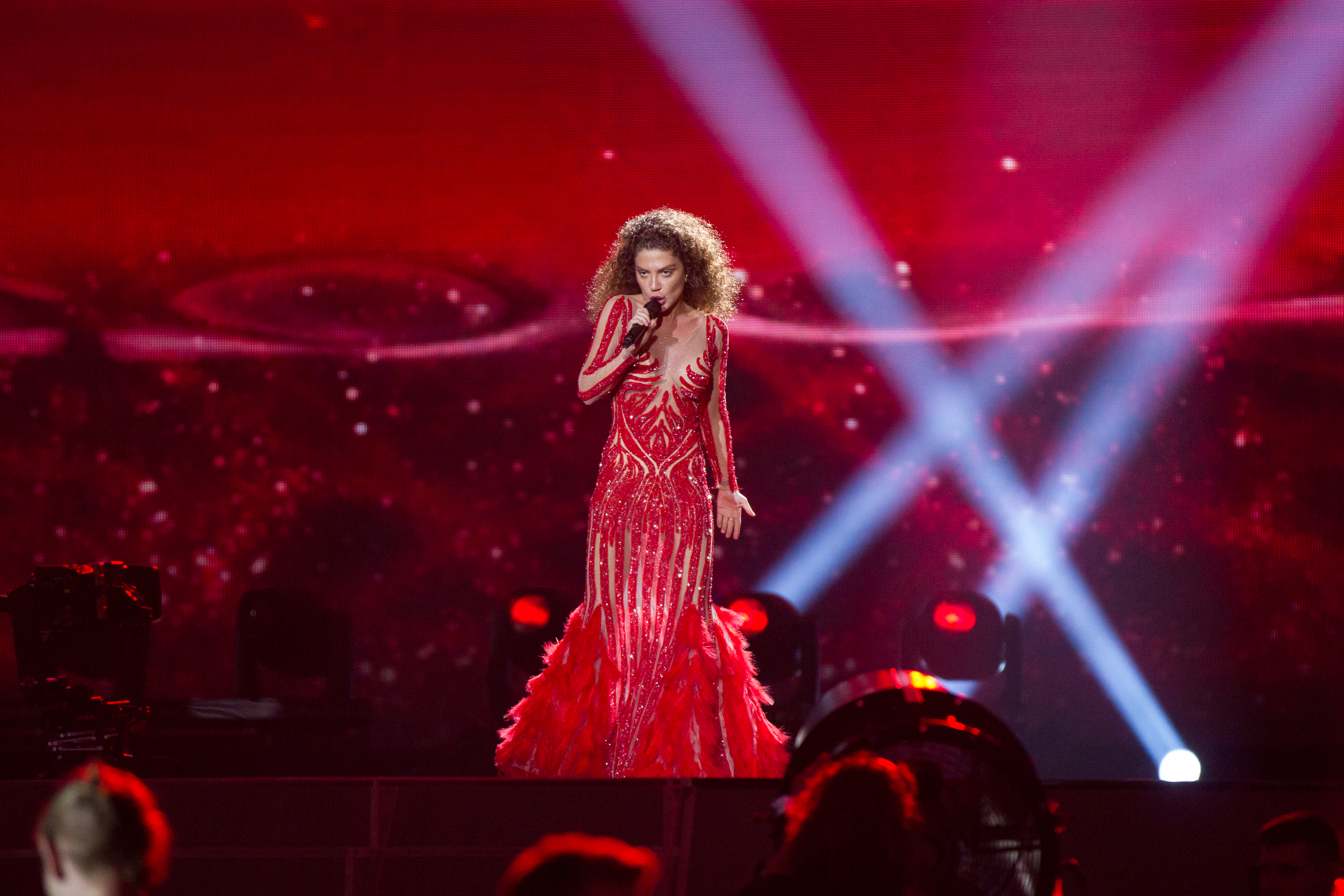
Tamara Gachechiladze during a rehearsal before the first semi-final

Tamara Gachechiladze took part in technical rehearsals on 30 April and 4 May, followed by dress rehearsals on 8 and 9 May. This included the jury show on 8 May where the professional juries of each country watched and voted on the competing entries.

The Georgian performance featured Tamara Gachechiladze in a full-length red dress with a cape, the latter which she later ripped off. The stage colours were red, white and black with the LED screen displaying a space theme. The performance also featured pyrotechnic flame effects. The staging director for the Georgian performance was Sacha Jean-Baptiste. Tamara Gachechiladze was joined by five off-stage backing vocalists: Giorgi Tskhvariashvili, Guri Pasikashvili, Mariam Akobia, Mariam Jomardidze and Natia Oqruashvili.

At the end of the show, Georgia was not announced among the top 10 entries in the first semi-final and therefore failed to qualify to compete in the final. It was later revealed that Georgia placed eleventh in the semi-final, receiving a total of 99 points: 37 points from the televoting and 62 points from the juries.

=== Voting ===
Voting during the three shows involved each country awarding two sets of points from 1-8, 10 and 12: one from their professional jury and the other from televoting. Each nation's jury consisted of five music industry professionals who are citizens of the country they represent, with their names published before the contest to ensure transparency. This jury judged each entry based on: vocal capacity; the stage performance; the song's composition and originality; and the overall impression by the act. In addition, no member of a national jury was permitted to be related in any way to any of the competing acts in such a way that they cannot vote impartially and independently. The individual rankings of each jury member as well as the nation's televoting results were released shortly after the grand final.

Below is a breakdown of points awarded to Georgia and awarded by Georgia in the first semi-final and grand final of the contest, and the breakdown of the jury voting and televoting conducted during the two shows:

==== Points awarded to Georgia ====
Points awarded to Georgia (Semi-final 1)
Score	Televote	Jury
12 points	Azerbaijan	
10 points		Poland
8 points	Armenia	
7 points		Iceland
6 points	Greece; Portugal	Armenia; Azerbaijan; Sweden
5 points		Moldova; Slovenia
4 points		Greece
3 points		Belgium; Finland; Portugal
2 points	Italy; Moldova	Italy
1 point	Cyprus	Albania; United Kingdom

==== Points awarded by Georgia ====
Points awarded by Georgia (Semi-final 1)
Score	Televote	Jury
12 points	Azerbaijan	Portugal
10 points	Armenia	Azerbaijan
8 points	Portugal	Sweden
7 points	Cyprus	Armenia
6 points	Moldova	Australia
5 points	Belgium	Cyprus
4 points	Sweden	Slovenia
3 points	Poland	Moldova
2 points	Greece	Iceland
1 point	Iceland	Czech Republic

Points awarded by Georgia (Final)
Score	Televote	Jury
12 points	Azerbaijan	Portugal
10 points	Armenia	Azerbaijan
8 points	Portugal	Sweden
7 points	Bulgaria	Norway
6 points	Belarus	Bulgaria
5 points	Italy	Austria
4 points	Ukraine	Cyprus
3 points	France	Armenia
2 points	Cyprus	Italy
1 point	Sweden	Netherlands

==== Detailed voting results ====
The following members comprised the Georgian jury:

- Maia Baratashvili (jury chairperson) – singer, musician
- Medea Kavtaradze – vocal coach
- Mirian Kukulashvili – musical producer
- Gvantsa Kilasonia – TV producer
- Mamuka Begashvili – composer, sound engineer

Detailed voting results from Georgia (Semi-final 1)
R/O	Country	Jury							Televote	
R/O	Country	M. Kavtaradze	M. Kukulashvili	M. Baratashvili	G. Kilasonia	M. Begashvili	Rank	Points	Rank	Points
01	Sweden	6	5	12	2	7	3	8	7	4
02	Georgia									
03	Australia	12	9	3	9	3	5	6	12	
04	Albania	17	17	15	14	17	17		16	
05	Belgium	16	3	14	8	15	13		6	5
06	Montenegro	11	15	16	3	16	14		14	
07	Finland	15	6	13	11	5	11		11	
08	Azerbaijan	4	1	2	6	2	2	10	1	12
09	Portugal	1	4	1	1	1	1	12	3	8
10	Greece	13	7	17	16	8	15		9	2
11	Poland	10	8	10	17	10	12		8	3
12	Moldova	5	14	9	12	6	8	3	5	6
13	Iceland	9	10	8	7	12	9	2	10	1
14	Czech Republic	14	12	7	5	11	10	1	17	
15	Cyprus	7	2	5	13	9	6	5	4	7
16	Armenia	3	11	4	10	4	4	7	2	10
17	Slovenia	2	13	6	4	14	7	4	13	
18	Latvia	8	16	11	15	13	16		15	

Detailed voting results from Georgia (Final)
R/O	Country	Jury							Televote	
R/O	Country	M. Kavtaradze	M. Kukulashvili	M. Baratashvili	G. Kilasonia	M. Begashvili	Rank	Points	Rank	Points
01	Israel	23	26	23	16	17	25		11	
02	Poland	6	22	22	9	22	18		20	
03	Belarus	20	25	24	25	8	23		5	6
04	Austria	10	7	12	8	9	6	5	22	
05	Armenia	8	13	13	11	13	8	3	2	10
06	Netherlands	11	9	10	15	16	10	1	19	
07	Moldova	7	23	18	19	10	16		12	
08	Hungary	13	16	20	5	26	17		23	
09	Italy	3	17	11	4	24	9	2	6	5
10	Denmark	14	10	8	14	19	12		25	
11	Portugal	1	3	1	1	1	1	12	3	8
12	Azerbaijan	2	2	2	3	6	2	10	1	12
13	Croatia	12	8	16	13	20	14		17	
14	Australia	15	18	17	17	3	15		26	
15	Greece	17	11	25	18	23	21		15	
16	Spain	19	24	26	26	21	26		24	
17	Norway	16	1	6	6	2	4	7	21	
18	United Kingdom	24	20	9	20	18	19		16	
19	Cyprus	5	6	19	7	14	7	4	9	2
20	Romania	21	21	15	24	11	20		18	
21	Germany	22	5	5	21	12	13		14	
22	Ukraine	25	15	21	22	15	22		7	4
23	Belgium	26	14	14	23	25	24		13	
24	Sweden	4	4	3	2	5	3	8	10	1
25	Bulgaria	9	12	4	12	4	5	6	4	7
26	France	18	19	7	10	7	11		8	3
