= Tamara Gachechiladze =

Georgian singer, songwriter and actress (born 1983)

Tamara Gachechiladze თამარა გაჩეჩილაძე
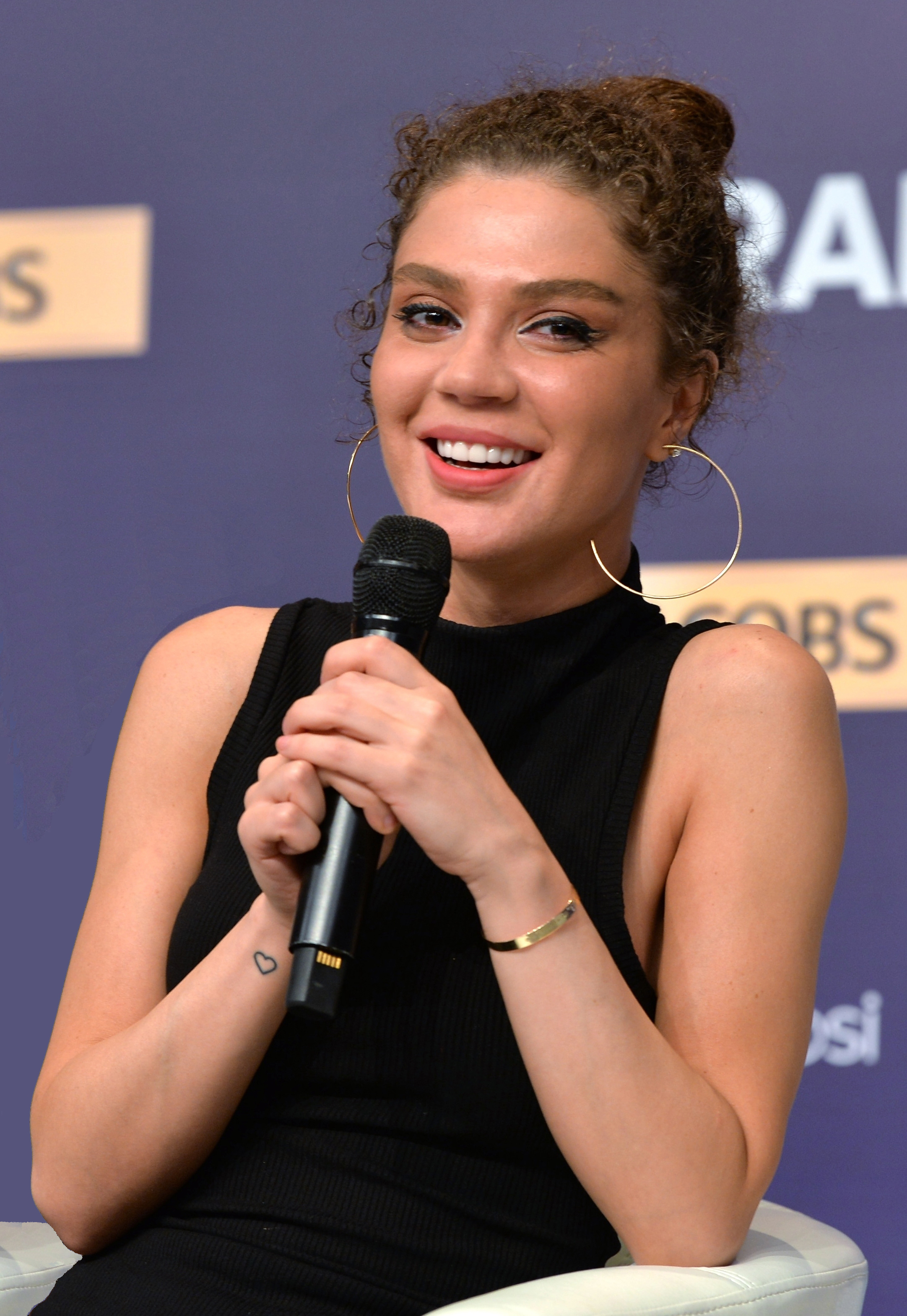
- Milanova in 2017

Background information
- Also known as: Tako Gachechiladze; Tamara Milanova
- Born: 17 March 1983 (age 43); Tbilisi, Georgian SSR, USSR
- Genres: Pop; R&B; soul
- Occupations: Singer; songwriter; actress
- Instrument: Vocals

Tamara "Tako" Milanova (née Gachechiladze; Georgian: თამარა "თაკო" მილანოვა, née გაჩეჩილაძე; born 17 March 1983) is a Georgian singer, songwriter and actress. She represented Georgia in the Eurovision Song Contest 2017, with the song "Keep the Faith".

== Career ==
She took part in the national final for Georgia in the Eurovision Song Contest 2008, with the song "Me and My Funky", coming in tenth place. As a member of the quartet Stephane & 3G, she also placed fourth in the same national final with the song "I'm Free", and was going to represent Georgia in the Eurovision Song Contest 2009 with the song "We Don't Wanna Put In", until the group's entry was disqualified for political content. She intended to enter Georgian national final for the Eurovision Song Contest in 2011, but ultimately withdrew due to health problems.

In 2017, she represented Georgia in the Eurovision Song Contest 2017 with the song "Keep the Faith" but failed to qualify to the final, finishing in 11th place in the first semi-final.

== Personal life ==
In 2018, Gachechiladze married Bulgarian songwriter Borislav Milanov at Mama Daviti Church in Tbilisi. They had met while both were participating in the Eurovision Song Contest 2017; Gachechiladze was representing Georgia, while Milanov had written the entries for Serbia, North Macedonia, and Bulgaria. They have two children and live in Austria.

== Discography ==
=== Singles ===
Title	Year	Album
"Me and My Funky"	2008	Non-album singles
"Keep the Faith"	2017	Non-album singles

Awards and achievements
Preceded by Nika Kocharov & Young Georgian Lolitaz with "Midnight Gold"	Georgia in the Eurovision Song Contest; 2017	Succeeded by Ethno-Jazz Band Iriao with "For You"
