= Georgia in the Eurovision Song Contest 2016 =

- Eurovision Song Contest 2016
- Participating broadcaster: Georgian Public Broadcaster (GPB)
- Country: Georgia
- Selection process: Artist: Internal selection Song: Evrovizia 2016 - Airchie sheni simgera!
- Selection date: Artist: 15 December 2015; Song: 15 February 2016

Competing entry
- Song: "Midnight Gold"
- Artist: Nika Kocharov and Young Georgian Lolitaz
- Songwriters: Kote Kalandadze; Thomas G:son

Placement
- Semi-final result: Qualified (9th, 123 points)
- Final result: 20th, 104 points

Participation chronology

Georgia was represented at the Eurovision Song Contest 2016 with the song "Midnight Gold", written by Kote Kalandadze and Thomas G:son, and performed by Nika Kocharov and the Young Georgian Lolitaz. The Georgian participating broadcaster, Georgian Public Broadcaster (GPB), internally selected its performer for the contest in December 2015. A national final was held to select the song that Nika Kocharov and the Young Georgian Lolitaz would perform. An open call for song submissions was held which resulted in the shortlisting of five entries that were presented to the public on 3 February 2016. The public had until 15 February to vote for their favourite song. The results of the public vote combined with the votes of an international jury resulted in the selection of "Midnight Gold" as the Georgian entry.

Georgia was drawn to compete in the second semi-final of the Eurovision Song Contest which took place on 12 May 2016. Performing during the show in position 16, "Midnight Gold" was announced among the top 10 entries of the second semi-final and therefore qualified to compete in the final on 14 May. It was later revealed that Georgia placed ninth out of the 18 participating countries in the semi-final with 123 points. In the final, Georgia performed in position 23 and placed twentieth out of the 26 participating countries, scoring 104 points.

== Background ==
Prior to the 2016 contest, Georgia had participated in the Eurovision Song Contest eight times since their first entry in 2007. The nation's highest placing in the contest, to this point, has been ninth place, which was achieved on two occasions: in 2010 with the song "Shine" performed by Sofia Nizharadze and in 2011 with the song "One More Day" performed by Eldrine. The nation briefly withdrew from the contest in 2009 after the European Broadcasting Union (EBU) rejected the Georgian entry, "We Don't Wanna Put In", for perceived political references to Vladimir Putin who was the Russian Prime Minister at the time. The withdrawal and fallout was tied to tense relations between Georgia and then host country Russia, which stemmed from the 2008 Russo-Georgian War. Following the introduction of semi-finals, Georgia has, to this point, failed to qualify to the final on only two occasions. In 2015, Georgia qualified to the final where the country placed 11th with the song "Warrior" performed by Nina Sublatti.

The Georgian national broadcaster, Georgian Public Broadcaster (GPB), broadcasts the event within Georgia and organises the selection process for the nation's entry. GPB confirmed their intentions to participate at the 2016 Eurovision Song Contest on 15 September 2015. Georgia has selected their entry for the Eurovision Song Contest both through national finals and internal selections in the past. In 2013 and 2014, GPB opted to internally select the Georgian entry while in 2015, the Georgian entry was selected via a national final. For their 2016 participation, the artist was selected internally by the broadcaster, while the song was selected through a national final.

== Before Eurovision ==
=== Artist selection ===
On 15 December 2015, the broadcaster held a press conference and announced that they had internally selected Nika Kocharov and the Young Georgian Lolitaz to represent Georgia in Stockholm. During the press conference, GPB announced that a national final would be held to select their song.

=== Evrovizia 2016 - Airchie sheni simgera! ===
GPB opened a public song submission from 15 December 2015 until 8 January 2016. The broadcaster sought songs that fit the style of the selected musicians: "melodic song structure of alternative and indie rock with electronic beats, synths and/or samples, and club orientation of post-disco dance music." Over 100 songs were received by the submission deadline and an expert commission selected the top five songs from the received submissions. The songs were presented to the public on 3 February 2016 during the GPB First Channel programme Komunikatori, hosted by Vakho Khvichia and Elene Margvelashvili, and the public was able to vote for their favourite song through telephone and SMS between 4 and 15 February 2016. The winning song, "Midnight Gold", was determined upon by the combination of the votes of an international jury and the public televote, and was announced on 15 February during Komunikatori. The international jury consisted of Andy Mikheev (journalist and Eurovision expert), Christer Björkman (supervisor of Melodifestivalen and producer of the 2016 Eurovision Song Contest), Sasha Jean Baptiste (staging director) and Marvin Dietmann (choreographer). An advisory online vote was held during the public voting period, which was also won by "Midnight Gold" with 9,604 votes.

Final – 15 February 2016
R/O	Song	Songwriter(s)	Jury		Televote		Total	Place
R/O	Song	Songwriter(s)	Votes	Points	Votes	Points	Total	Place
1	"Midnight Gold"	Kote Kalandadze	13	32.5	1,310	50	82.5	1
2	"Pain in My Heart"	Giorgi Sikharulidze	11	27.5	9	0.34	27.84	5
3	"Right or Wrong"	Sandro Sulakvelidze	12	30	15	0.57	30.57	3
4	"Sugar and Milk"	Gia Iashvili	14	35	42	1.6	36.6	2
5	"We Agree"	Nika Kocharov, Vazha Marr	10	25	142	5.42	30.42	4

Detailed International Jury Votes
R/O	Artist	A. Mikheev	C. Björkman	S.J. Baptiste	M. Dietmann	Total
1	"Midnight Gold"	5	3	2	3	13
2	"Pain in My Heart"	4	2	4	1	11
3	"Right or Wrong"	3	1	3	5	12
4	"Sugar and Milk"	2	5	5	2	14
5	"We Agree"	1	4	1	4	10

=== Preparation ===
Nika Kocharov and the Young Georgian Lolitaz recorded the final version of "Midnight Gold" at the Red Bull Studios in Berlin following the national final. The performers worked with Swedish composer Thomas G:son to refine and create a three-minute version of the song. On 11 March, the final version of the song premiered together with the music video on the GPB programme Komunikatori. The music video was based on two concepts: one written and directed by Temo Ezugbaia and the other written by Nika Kocharov and directed by Temo Kvirkvelia. The final version of the video was directed by Nestan Sinjikashvili.

== At Eurovision ==
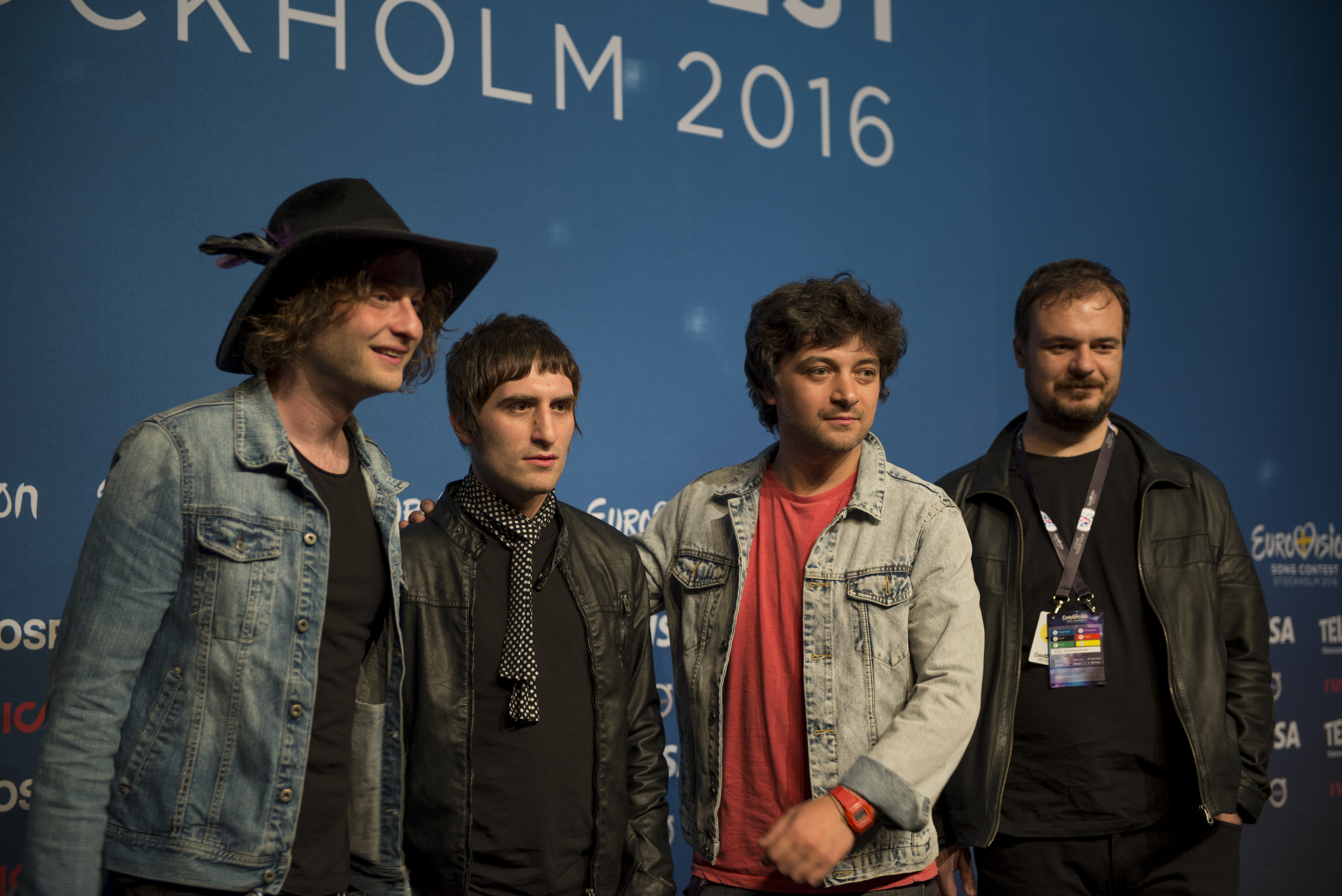
Nika Kocharov and the Young Georgian Lolitaz during a press meet and greet

According to Eurovision rules, all nations with the exceptions of the host country and the "Big Five" (France, Germany, Italy, Spain and the United Kingdom) are required to qualify from one of two semi-finals in order to compete for the final; the top ten countries from each semi-final progress to the final. The European Broadcasting Union (EBU) split up the competing countries into six different pots based on voting patterns from previous contests, with countries with favourable voting histories put into the same pot. On 25 January 2016, a special allocation draw was held which placed each country into one of the two semi-finals, as well as which half of the show they would perform in. Georgia was placed into the second semi-final, to be held on 12 May 2016, and was scheduled to perform in the second half of the show.

Once all the competing songs for the 2016 contest had been released, the running order for the semi-finals was decided by the shows' producers rather than through another draw, so that similar songs were not placed next to each other. Georgia was set to perform in position 17, following the entry from Norway and before the entry from Albania. But after Romania was removed from the running order of the competition, Georgia's position shifted to 16.

The two semi-finals and the final were broadcast in Georgia on GBP First Channel with commentary by Tuta Chkheidze and Nika Katsia. The Georgian spokesperson, who announced the top 12-point score awarded by the Georgian jury during the final, was 2015 Georgian Eurovision entrant Nina Sublatti.

=== Semi-final ===
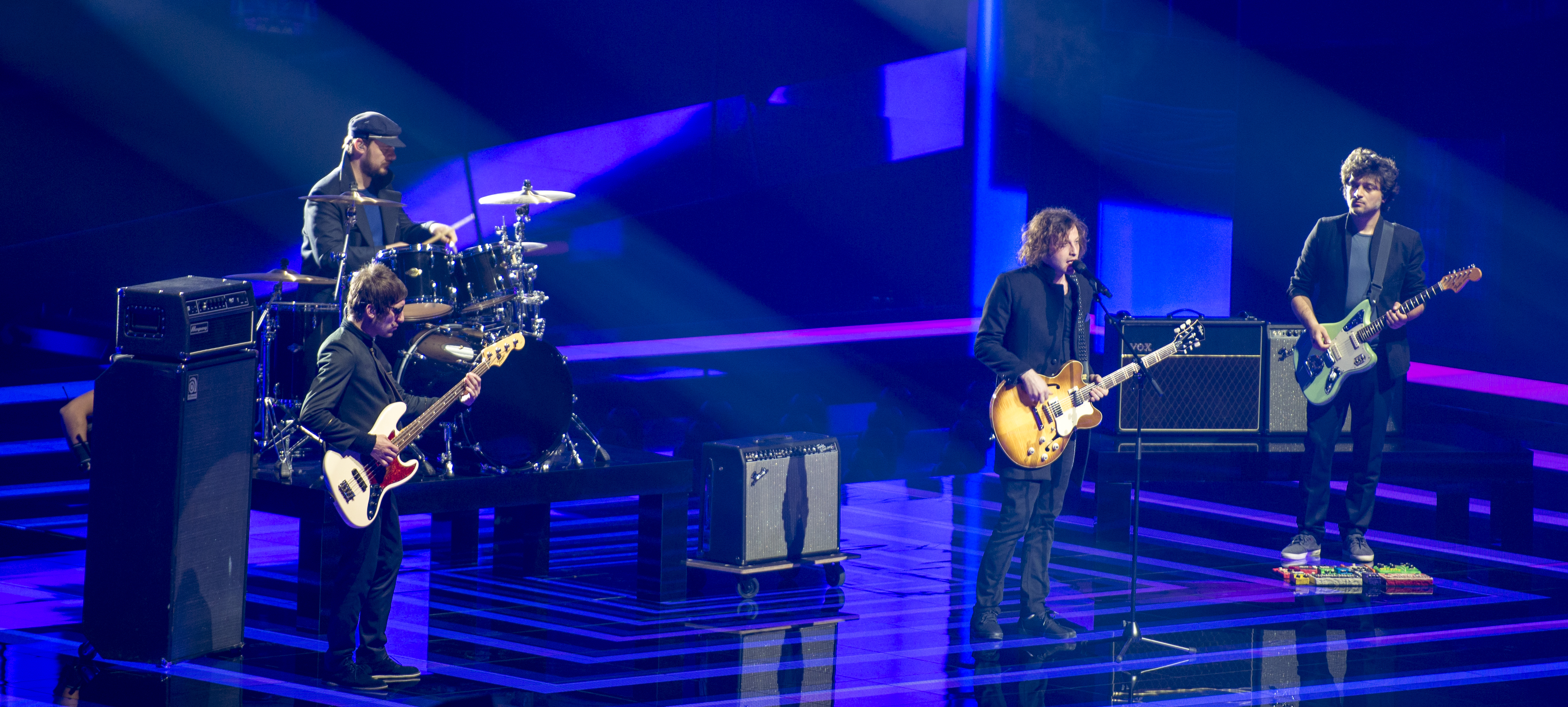
Nika Kocharov and the Young Georgian Lolitaz during a rehearsal before the second semi-final

Nika Kocharov and the Young Georgian Lolitaz took part in technical rehearsals on 5 and 7 May, followed by dress rehearsals on 11 and 12 May. This included the jury show on 11 May where the professional juries of each country watched and voted on the competing entries.

The Georgian performance featured Nika Kocharov and the Young Georgian Lolitaz performing in a band set-up dressed in outfits designed by Georgian designer Marika Kurdubadze. The stage colours were yellow and purple with the fast moving lights and LED screen patterns creating a psychedelic look. The camera work for the performance featured mirror and duplication effects that created a kaleidoscopic effect. The performance also featured smoke and pyrotechnic effects. The staging director for the Georgian performance was Sacha Jean-Baptiste. The Georgian performers were joined by one off-stage backing vocalist: Lars Säfsund.

At the end of the show, Georgia was announced as having finished in the top 10 and subsequently qualifying for the grand final. It was later revealed that Georgia placed ninth in the semi-final, receiving a total of 123 points: 39 points from the televoting and 84 points from the juries.

=== Final ===
Shortly after the second semi-final, a winners' press conference was held for the ten qualifying countries. As part of this press conference, the qualifying artists took part in a draw to determine which half of the grand final they would subsequently participate in. This draw was done in the reverse order the countries appeared in the semi-final running order. Georgia was drawn to compete in the second half. Following this draw, the shows' producers decided upon the running order of the final, as they had done for the semi-finals. Georgia was subsequently placed to perform in position 23, following the entry from Malta and before the entry from Austria.

Nika Kocharov and the Young Georgian Lolitaz once again took part in dress rehearsals on 13 and 14 May before the final, including the jury final where the professional juries cast their final votes before the live show. Nika Kocharov and the Young Georgian Lolitaz performed a repeat of their semi-final performance during the final on 14 May. Georgia placed twentieth in the final, scoring 104 points: 24 points from the televoting and 80 points from the juries.

=== Voting ===
Voting during the three shows was conducted under a new system that involved each country now awarding two sets of points from 1-8, 10 and 12: one from their professional jury and the other from televoting. Each nation's jury consisted of five music industry professionals who are citizens of the country they represent, with their names published before the contest to ensure transparency. This jury judged each entry based on: vocal capacity; the stage performance; the song's composition and originality; and the overall impression by the act. In addition, no member of a national jury was permitted to be related in any way to any of the competing acts in such a way that they cannot vote impartially and independently. The individual rankings of each jury member as well as the nation's televoting results were released shortly after the grand final.

Below is a breakdown of points awarded to Georgia and awarded by Georgia in the second semi-final and grand final of the contest, and the breakdown of the jury voting and televoting conducted during the two shows:

==== Points awarded to Georgia ====
Points awarded to Georgia (Semi-final 2)
Score	Televote	Jury
12 points		United Kingdom
10 points		Germany; Lithuania
8 points	Lithuania; Ukraine	Belgium
7 points	Poland	Bulgaria; Italy; Poland
6 points		Latvia
5 points	Germany; Latvia	Israel
4 points		Ukraine
3 points		Serbia
2 points	Belarus; Serbia	Belarus
1 point	Slovenia; United Kingdom	Ireland; Macedonia; Norway

Points awarded to Georgia (Final)
Score	Televote	Jury
12 points		United Kingdom
10 points		Armenia; Lithuania
8 points	Armenia	Germany; Poland
7 points		Belgium
6 points	Ukraine	San Marino
5 points		Greece; Russia
4 points	Lithuania	
3 points	Italy	Bulgaria; Italy; Ukraine
2 points	Latvia	
1 point	Azerbaijan	

==== Points awarded by Georgia ====
Points awarded by Georgia (Semi-final 2)
Score	Televote	Jury
12 points	Ukraine	Ukraine
10 points	Lithuania	Belgium
8 points	Latvia	Australia
7 points	Poland	Switzerland
6 points	Belarus	Israel
5 points	Bulgaria	Latvia
4 points	Australia	Denmark
3 points	Belgium	Poland
2 points	Serbia	Lithuania
1 point	Israel	Norway

Points awarded by Georgia (Final)
Score	Televote	Jury
12 points	Armenia	Ukraine
10 points	Ukraine	Belgium
8 points	Russia	Australia
7 points	Azerbaijan	Latvia
6 points	Latvia	Sweden
5 points	Lithuania	Lithuania
4 points	Poland	France
3 points	Bulgaria	Israel
2 points	Hungary	Croatia
1 point	Australia	Germany

==== Detailed voting results ====
The following members comprised the Georgian jury:

- George Asanishvili (jury chairperson) – sound engineer
- Mikheil Javakhishvili – singer, musical producer
- Helen Kalandadze – singer
- Nata Natsvlishvili – singer-songwriter
- Zaza Orashvili – stage and video director

Detailed voting results from Georgia (Semi-final 2)
R/O	Country	Jury							Televote	
R/O	Country	G. Asanishvili	M. Javakhishvili	H. Kalandadze	N. Natsvlishvili	Z. Orashvili	Rank	Points	Rank	Points
01	Latvia	7	14	6	11	3	6	5	3	8
02	Poland	17	9	8	4	8	8	3	4	7
03	Switzerland	2	8	7	13	6	4	7	16	
04	Israel	10	5	5	12	7	5	6	10	1
05	Belarus	16	10	15	5	10	14		5	6
06	Serbia	12	7	13	15	11	16		9	2
07	Ireland	11	11	11	10	12	13		15	
08	Macedonia	8	17	17	1	14	15		13	
09	Lithuania	9	13	4	8	13	9	2	2	10
10	Australia	4	4	3	14	5	3	8	7	4
11	Slovenia	13	15	16	6	4	12		14	
12	Bulgaria	14	16	9	2	17	17		6	5
13	Denmark	6	6	12	9	9	7	4	12	
14	Ukraine	1	1	1	17	1	1	12	1	12
15	Norway	15	3	10	7	15	10	1	11	
16	Georgia									
17	Albania	5	12	14	3	16	11		17	
18	Belgium	3	2	2	16	2	2	10	8	3

Detailed voting results from Georgia (Final)
R/O	Country	Jury							Televote	
R/O	Country	G. Asanishvili	M. Javakhishvili	H. Kalandadze	N. Natsvlishvili	Z. Orashvili	Rank	Points	Rank	Points
01	Belgium	1	3	3	9	4	2	10	21	
02	Czech Republic	15	10	13	15	14	12		20	
03	Netherlands	8	19	24	14	9	15		15	
04	Azerbaijan	16	20	12	19	20	21		4	7
05	Hungary	7	21	20	20	13	19		9	2
06	Italy	9	22	23	4	15	14		14	
07	Israel	18	11	5	11	8	8	3	19	
08	Bulgaria	24	23	14	22	25	24		8	3
09	Sweden	3	13	4	6	2	5	6	11	
10	Germany	19	14	10	8	12	10	1	13	
11	France	17	15	8	1	7	7	4	18	
12	Poland	25	9	11	17	24	20		7	4
13	Australia	4	2	2	12	3	3	8	10	1
14	Cyprus	10	17	17	16	17	17		12	
15	Serbia	11	16	16	10	10	11		23	
16	Lithuania	6	8	6	13	6	6	5	6	5
17	Croatia	12	7	21	2	19	9	2	24	
18	Russia	21	18	19	24	23	23		3	8
19	Spain	23	12	22	25	11	22		16	
20	Latvia	5	5	7	5	5	4	7	5	6
21	Ukraine	2	1	1	7	1	1	12	2	10
22	Malta	20	4	18	23	16	18		25	
23	Georgia									
24	Austria	22	25	25	21	18	25		17	
25	United Kingdom	14	24	9	3	21	13		22	
26	Armenia	13	6	15	18	22	16		1	12
