= Valeri Kocharov =

Georgian rock guitarist singer and songwriter (1948–2022)

Valeri Kocharov ვალერი კოჩაროვი
- Born: 1948
- Died: 3 May 2022 (aged 74)
- Genres: Rock
- Occupations: Singer; songwriter
- Instruments: Vocals; guitar

Valeri Kocharov (Note: Georgian: ვალერი კოჩაროვი, romanized: Valeri K’ocharovi) (1948 – 3 May 2022) was a Georgian artist, rock guitarist, and singer.

== Biography ==
Kocharov's musical career began in the early 1970s. Throughout his career, he has been a member of various musical groups, including "Quadrat", Cold Flame ("Cold Flame") and The Blitz, known for his original compositions (in Georgian and Russian) and The Beatles cover versions. Kocharov's name is associated with the promotion of The Beatles in Georgia. In 1989, at the Beatles's traditional competition, the festival's top prize for the British quartet's best external and musical imitation went to The Blitz.

Kocharov died of a stroke on 3 May 2022 at the age of 74.

== Personal life ==
Kocharov was the father of Nika Kocharov (b. 1980) who is also a well-known rock musician and leader of the band Young Georgian Lolitaz.
