= Gogokhia =

Gogokhia (Georgian: გოგოხია) is a Georgian surname. Notable people with the surname include:

- David Gogokhia (born 1987), Georgian experimental visual artist
- Enriko Gogokhia (born 1991), Ukrainian kickboxer
- Nina Gogokhia (born 1986), Georgian Neuroscientist, Feminist
