= Trio Mandili =

Georgian musical trio

Trio Mandili ტრიო მანდილი
- Origin: Tbilisi, Georgia
- Genres: folk; vocal music
- Years active: 2014–present
- Labels: EL Italia srl; Merlins Nose Records
- Members: Tatuli Mgeladze; Tako Tsiklauri; Mariam Kurasbediani
- Past members: Irina Midelauri; Elene Nareshelashvili; Anuka Chincharauli; Shorena Tsiskalauri
- Website: triomandili.com

Trio Mandili (მანდილი, "woman's headscarf") is a Georgian musical group which currently consists of Tatuli Mgeladze (თათული მგელაძე), Tako Tsiklauri (თაკო წიკლაური), and Mariam Kurasbediani (მარიამ ქურასბედიანი).

They perform polyphonic singing accompanied by a panduri, a traditional Georgian string instrument. They became popular in Georgia when they uploaded a music video in which they performed a Georgian folk song, "Apareka". This video has gathered over eight million views.

Trio Mandili have sung songs in other languages, such as the Hindi song "Goron Ki Na Kalon Ki Duniya Hai Dilwalon Ki" (English translation: Neither to whites nor to blacks the world belongs to the kindhearted) that was performed on India's Republic Day, as well as the Polish song "Lipka" (English translation: Little linden) and the Hebrew song "Adon Olam". Found on their YouTube channel, Trio Mandili has also recorded songs in Flemish, Spanish, Italian, Turkish, Croatian, Ukrainian, and Russian.

In 2017, the group participated in Evroviizis erovnul konkurss with the song "Me da shen" with the chance to represent Georgia at the Eurovision Song Contest 2017. They performed 10th and ultimately finished in 12th place with 65 points.

== Discography ==
Year	Title	Type	Label
2015	With Love, Trio Mandili	CD, album	EL ITALIA
2016	With Love, Trio Mandili	LP, album, RE	Merlins Orr Records MN 1014LP Yr Germany
2017	Enguro, Trio Mandili	CD, album	EL ITALIA
2021	Sakartvelo, Trio Mandili	CD, album	EL ITALIA

== Band members ==
- Tatuli Mgeladze – lead and backing vocals
- Mariam Kurasbediani – backing and occasional lead vocals, panduri (a traditional Georgian string instrument)
- Tako Tsiklauri – backing and occasional lead vocals, occasionally also plays the panduri and other instruments
