= Young Georgian Lolitaz =

Georgian indie rock band

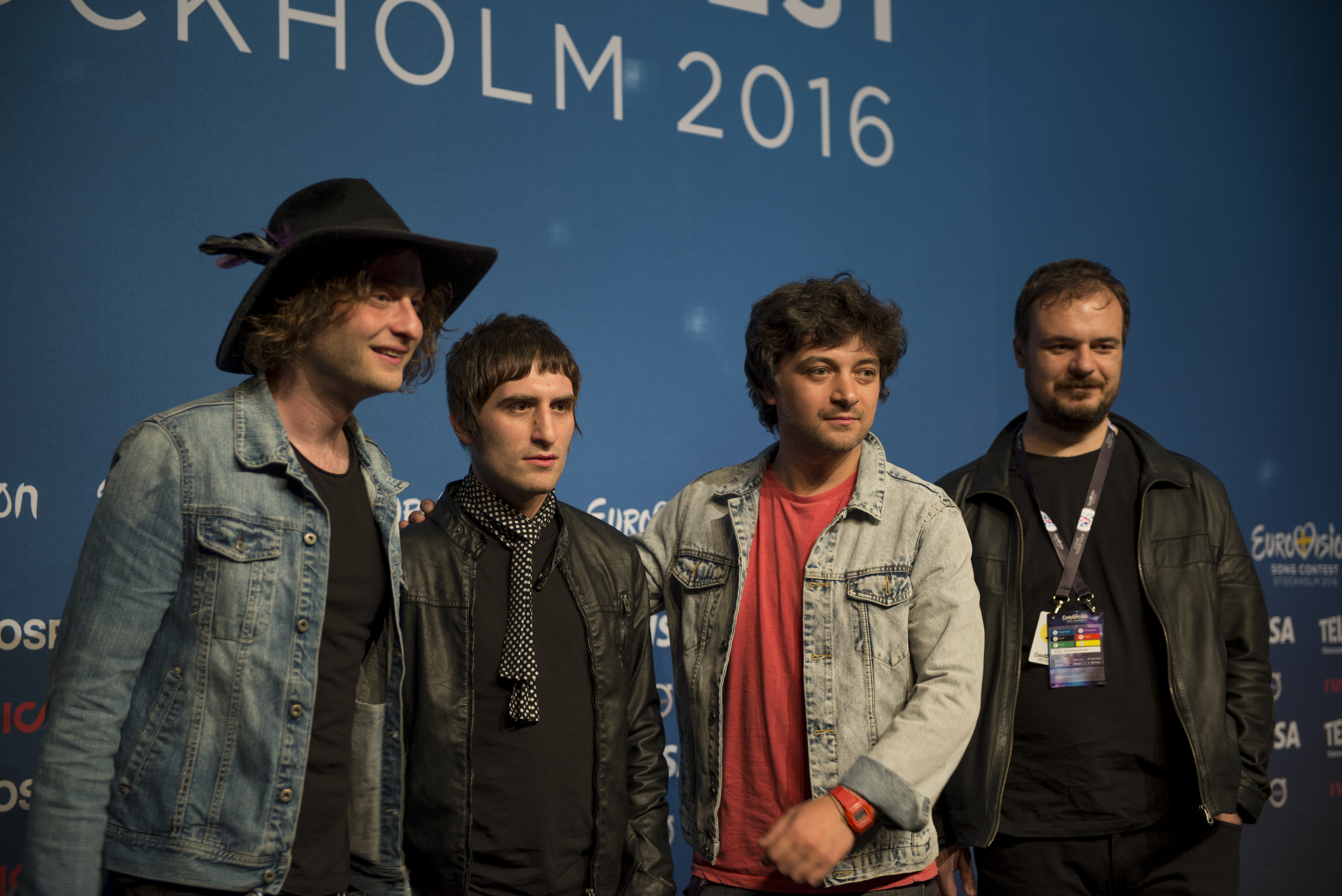
- Young Georgian Lolitaz at the Eurovision Song Contest 2016 (left to right: Nika Kocharov, Giorgi Marr, Levan Shanshiashvili, Dimitri Oganesian)

Background information
- Origin: Tbilisi, Georgia
- Genres: Alternative rock, indie rock
- Years active: 2000–present
- Members: Nika Kocharov (vocals); Giorgi Marr (bass guitar); Levan Shanshiashvili (guitar); Dimitri Oganesian (drums)
- Past members: David Svanidze (bass guitar); Guram Makalatia (drums)

Young Georgian Lolitaz is a Georgian indie rock band. They represented Georgia in the Eurovision Song Contest 2016 as Nika Kocharov & Young Georgian Lolitaz with the song "Midnight Gold". They are the first all-male band to represent Georgia in the contest.

The band consists of vocalist and guitarist Nika Kocharov (Georgian: ნიკა კოჩაროვი), vocalist and bassist Giorgi Marr (Georgian: გიორგი მარი), guitarist and keyboardist Levan Shanshiashvili (Georgian: ლევან შანშიაშვილი), and drummer Dimitri Oganesian (Georgian: დიმიტრი ოგანესიანი).

The band has released a studio album, Lemonjuice (2009), and an EP, The Lava EP (2010). In 2017 they released a single entitled "Dark Device".

Awards and achievements
Preceded by Nina Sublatti with "Warrior"	Georgia in the Eurovision Song Contest with Nika Kocharov; 2016	Succeeded by Tamara Gachechiladze with "Keep the Faith"
