= Sabina Chantouria =

Swedish-Georgian singer and songwriter

Olga Sabina Tchantouria Vamling (born 12 July 1991), professionally known as Sabina Chantouria, is a Swedish-Georgian singer and songwriter.

== Biography ==
Tchantouria Vamling was born in Lund, Sweden. She participated in the Georgian national competition final for the Eurovision Song Contest in 2017 Georgia in the Eurovision Song Contest 2017 with her song "Stranger", which she released after the national final. "Stranger" was recorded by Amir Aly in Malmö. In 2011, Chantouria was chosen to participate in the talent show World Championship of Performing Arts in Hollywood, with a song of her own. Chantouria has also made TV appearances and guested talkshows in Georgia and worked with big names in both Sweden and Georgia. Chantouria has performed at festivals and given concert in Sweden, Denmark, Georgia and the US. In 2012, she won the music competition Publikens favorit by Malmöfestivalen in Sweden.

In 2013, Chantouria released her debut maxi single A Confession. Thereafter Spiderweb (2014) and, in 2016, the widely acclaimed single "Cry for Me". The song Cry for me was recorded by the American producer Kevin Jarvis (who has worked with Iggy Pop, Leonard Cohen, Elvis Costello, Ben Vaughn etc. The actor Ryan Francis (teenage Peter Pan in the film Hook by Steven Spielberg), acted together with Sabina in her music videos "Spiderweb" and "Cry for Me".

== Discography ==
=== Singles ===
- 2013: "A Confession" (maxi single)
- 2014: "Spiderweb"
- 2016: "Cry for Me"
- 2017: "Stranger"

== Music videos ==
- 2014: "Spiderweb"
- 2016: "Cry for Me"
- 2017: "Stranger"
