= Nina Sublatti =

Nina Sublatti ნინა სუბლატი
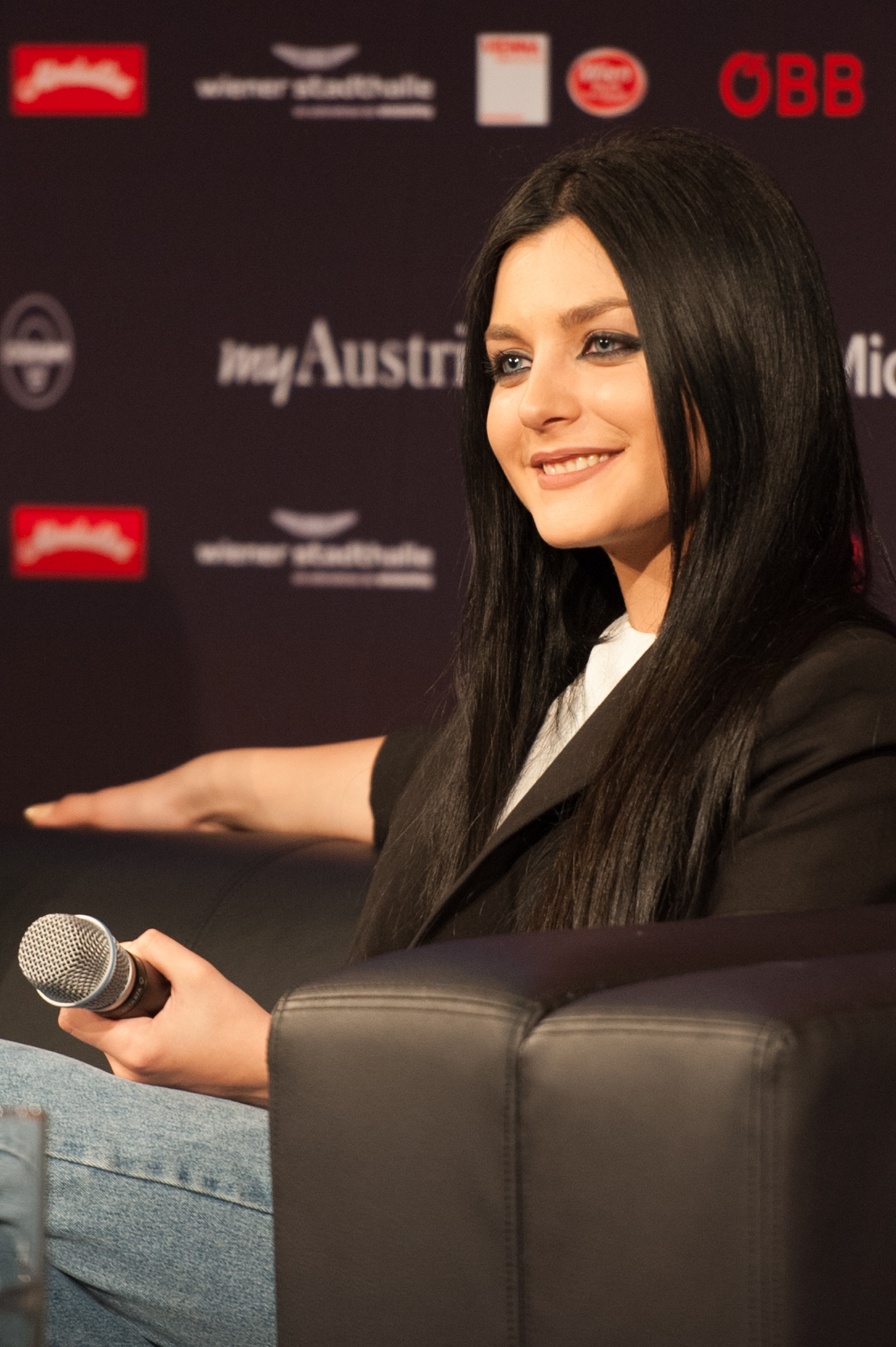
- Sublatti in 2015.

Background information
- Born: Nino Sulaberidze; 31 January 1995 (age 31); Moscow, Russia
- Origin: Tbilisi, Georgia
- Genres: Indie pop; alternative rock; ambient; dark pop; synthpop
- Occupations: Singer; songwriter; model
- Instruments: Vocals; piano
- Years active: 2008–present
- Website: ninasublatti.com

Nino Sulaberidze (Georgian: ნინო სულაბერიძე, born 31 January 1995), better known by her stage name Nina Sublatti (Georgian: ნინა სუბლატი), is a Georgian singer, songwriter, and model.

Sublatti achieved international attention when she represented Georgia in Eurovision Song Contest 2015 with her song "Warrior", where she placed 11th with 51 points. Sublatti won the 2013 season of the Georgian version of Idols. In 2016, she became one of the judges of X Factor Georgia, and later became a judge on the Georgian version of Idols.

== Life and career ==
=== Early life and career ===
Sublatti was born to Georgian parents in Moscow, Russia on 31 January 1995. Her birth name is Nino Sulaberidze. Shortly after her birth, her family moved back to Georgia. Sublatti also lived in Riga, Latvia for a time as a child. In 2008, Sublatti received a contract from a modelling agency and began modelling. In early 2009, Sublatti was approached by fashion scouts and a modelling agency to model for top magazines. While being a model Sublatti performed across Georgia and worked with bands such as The Mins. In 2011, Sublatti began to work with the Georgian Dream Studio, an influential music house where she worked with the singer Bera Ivanishvili.

=== 2013–2014: Georgian Idol and Dare to Be Nina Sublatti ===
In 2013, Sublatti was announced as the winner of Georgian Idol, the Georgian version of Idols. The following year, she released her debut album Dare to Be Nina Sublatti which went on to become the best-selling album in Georgia of all-time. Five of the album's tracks are covers of popular songs, including two Sublatti performed on Sakartvelos Varskvlavi; "Blue Jeans" by Lana Del Rey and "Uninvited" by Alanis Morissette.

=== 2014–2015: Eurovision Song Contest 2015 ===
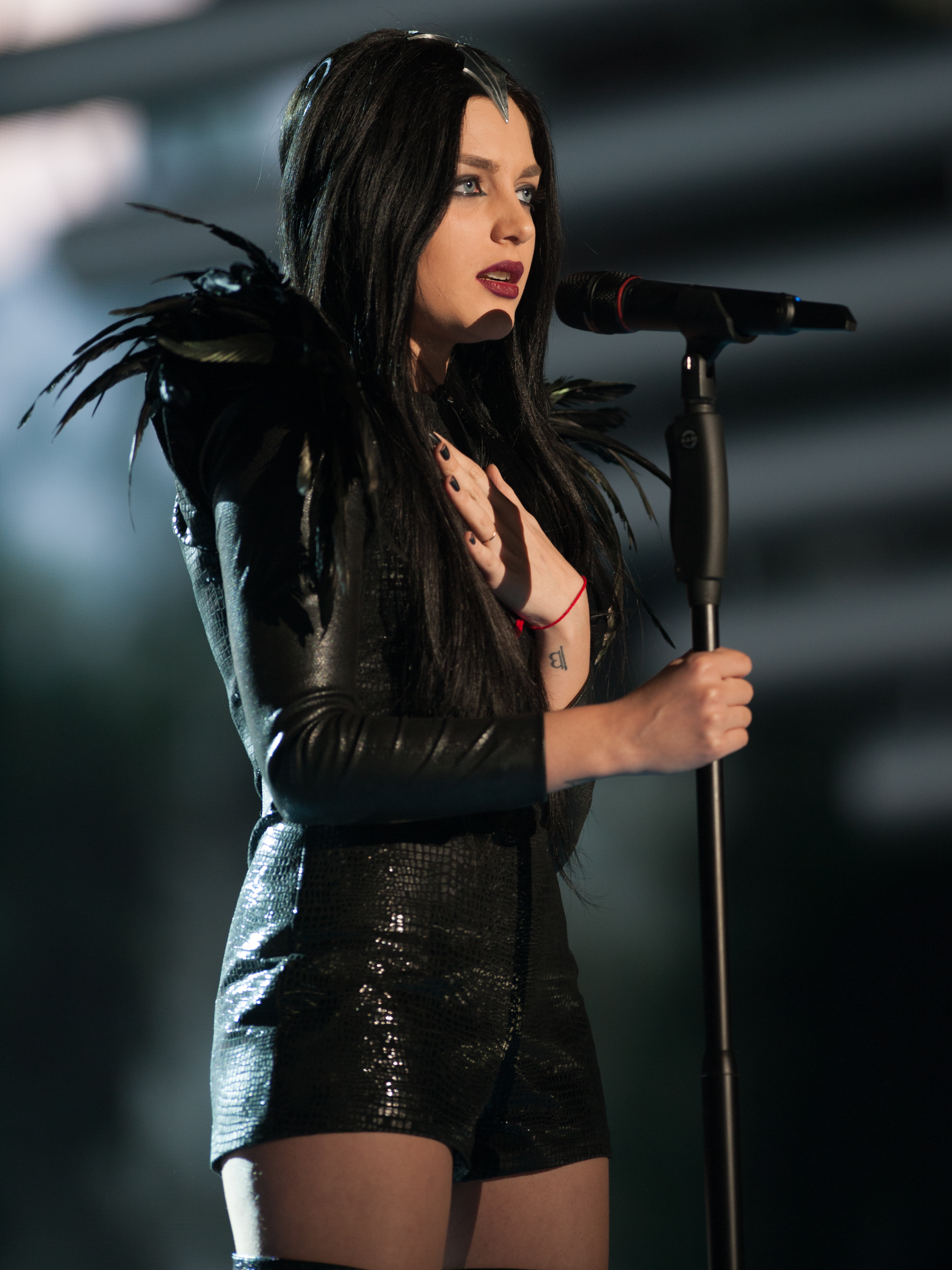
Sublatti performing at the Eurovision Song Contest 2015.

Following the success of Sublatti's debut album, in December 2014 she was announced as one of the five contestants competing to represent Georgia in the Eurovision Song Contest 2015 with the song "Warrior". On 14 January 2015, Sublatti competed in the national final and was announced as the winner, earning 38.1% of the televote and a score of 21 from the official jury. The public had two weeks to cast their vote with these two weeks spanning from 1 January 2015 to 14 January 2015. Sublatti went on to work with Swedish composer Thomas G:son and Swedish choreographer Sacha Jean-Baptiste to prepare for Eurovision. She performed "Warrior" at the Eurovision semi-finals on 19 May and advanced to the grand final, placing fourth with 98 points. In the final, she finished eleventh earning 51 points.

Following the Grand Final of the Eurovision Song Contest 2015 "Warrior" charted across Europe, in Ireland the entry charted within the Top 50 with its peak position being 44. In Ukraine, the song reached the Top 40, and in Russia, "Warrior" successfully reached the Top 30 charting at a peak position of 29. While in Turkey, the song peaked at number-two.

=== 2016–present: X Factor Georgia and Georgian Idol ===
In 2016, she became a judge on the Georgian version of The X Factor along with Nika Gvaramia, Sofia Nizharadze and Giorgi Gabunia. In October 2017, she became a judge on the Georgian version of Idols.

== Personal life ==
Sublatti notes her biggest musical influences are Janis Joplin, Brian Molko, and Björk. She has several tattoos on her body, which she sketches herself. She is married to Georgian trumpeter George Shamanauri with whom she occasionally collaborates with in music. Sublatti had her first child Alex in 2020 with her husband.

== Discography ==
- Dare to Be Nina Sublatti (2014)

Awards and achievements
Preceded by Luka Zakariadze	Saqartvelos Varskvlavi winner 2013	Incumbent
Preceded by The Shin and Mariko with "Three Minutes to Earth"	Georgia in the Eurovision Song Contest; 2015	Succeeded by Nika Kocharov & Young Georgian Lolitaz with "Midnight Gold"
