= Mariam Chachkhiani =

Georgian singer (born 1995)

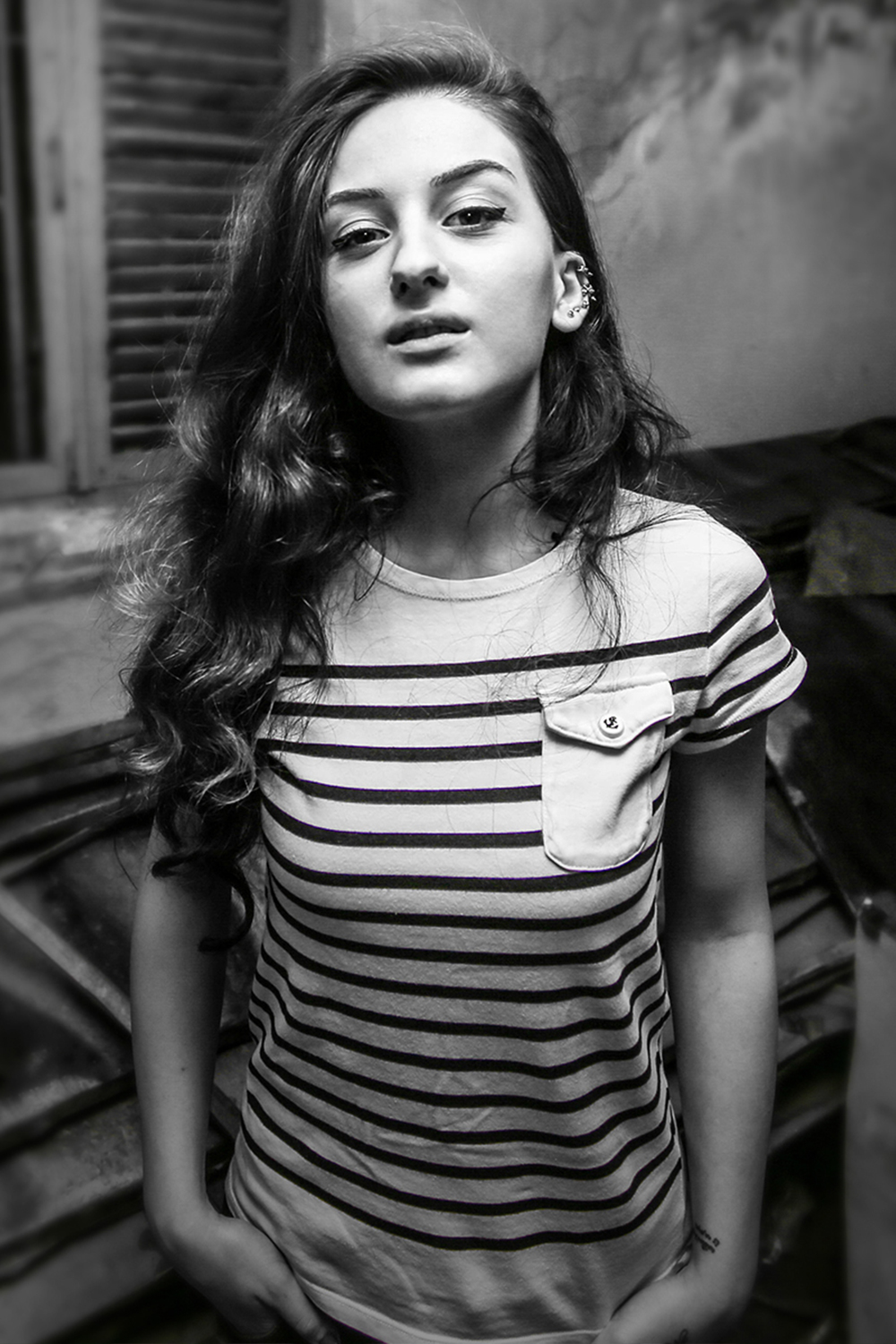

Background information
- Born: March 10, 1995 (age 31); Tbilisi, Georgia
- Genres: Pop, dubstep, R&B, soul
- Occupation: Singer
- Instrument: Vocals
- Years active: 2012–present
- Label: Unsigned artist
- Website: mariamofficial.com

Mariam Chachkhiani (Georgian: მარიამ ჩაჩხიანი; born March 10, 1995) is a Georgian singer, best known for winning Season 2 of Imedi's reality TV singing competition The Voice of Georgia as part of David Porchkhidze's team.

== Beginnings ==
Mariam first appeared on the stage since age 6 with other young singers on Tbilisi Concert Hall stage

Mariam took part in the Georgian national selection for the Junior Eurovision Song Contest 2007 as a part of a trio and reached the national final of 12 songs.

In 2008, Mariam took a part in the International Nail Song Festival and won the 2nd place among participants from 28 countries.

In 2010 in the "I Love Tbilisi" Festival, where the jury were mostly from Italy and Misha Mdinaradze from Georgia, Mariam hit the 1st place, beating the participants from over 18 countries.

== The Voice of Georgia ==
On the third episode of the Blind Auditions broadcast on October 15, 2013, Mariam performed Jennifer Hudson's song "And I Am Telling You I'm Not Going". All four judges turned their chairs and Mariam chose to join David Porchkhidze's team.

On the Battle Round, Mariam was against Ani Chkheidze, they both performed Natalie Cole’s song "Inseparable".

On the Knockout Round, Mariam performed Whitney Houston’s song "Run To You".

On the first Live, Mariam performed Beth Hart’s song "Mama".

On the third Live, Mariam performed Leona Lewis’s song "Here I Am".

On the semi-final Live she performed Aerosmith’s song "I Don't Want to Miss a Thing".

And on the Final live, Mariam performed Jennifer Hudson's song "And I Am Telling You I'm Not Going" again and won the show.

== After competition ==
After The Voice, she released her debut single "Gibberish", which was an international collaboration. The British company Loop G created the beats, and the lyrics were penned by the Brazilian Ronaldo Junior.

== Discography ==
=== Singles ===
- 2014: "Feel Free"
- 2015: "Gibberish"
- 2015: "The Grin" (feat. George Moller & Mariam Abdushelishvili)
- 2015: "Fly Away (feat. Jambazi)"
- 2015: "You're Mine (feat. Cool Yan)"
- 2016: "Reborn (feat. George Moller)"
- 2017: "Fly"

== Music videos ==
- 2015: "Gibberish"
  - Music video was directed by David Gogokhia.
- 2016: "Fly Away" (feat. Jambazi)
  - Music video was directed by David Gogokhia.

== Charts ==
Chart (2015)	Peak position
Georgia (Music Box Top 5)	5

Awards and achievements
Preceded by Salome Katamadze	ახალი ქართული ხმა (The Voice of Georgia) Winner; 2013-14	Succeeded by Giorgi Nadibaidze
