= David Gogokhia =

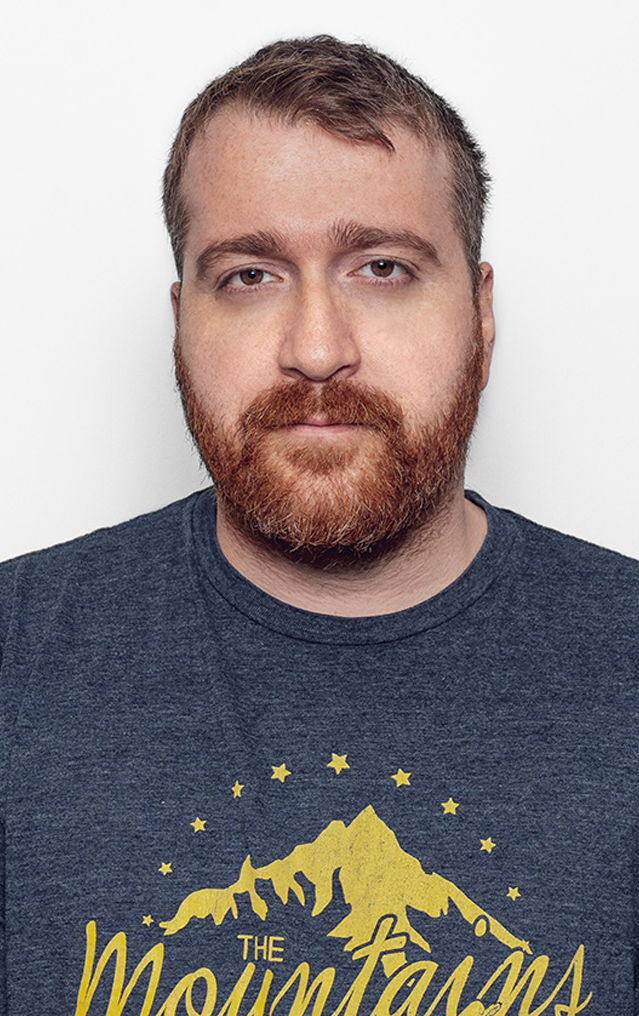
- Born: July 16, 1987 (age 38); Jvari, Georgia
- Website: http://www.gogokhia.com

David Gogokhia (Georgian: დავით გოგოხია, born 16 July 1987 in Jvari, Georgia) is a Georgian experimental visual artist, director of photography, and video editor, specialize in music videos, commercials etc

== Early life ==
David was born in Jvari (Georgia). He spent part of his childhood growing up in Moscow, Russia until his family moved to Georgia. After graduating from Georgian Technical University in 2008, he began working as a web designer for a while. Later, he left a job and started direct music videos, short films, commercials etc.

== Filmography ==
2013

- Mister Dzidza (Director of Photography)

== Music videography ==
2014

- Lasha Kicks feat. Nina Sublatti - "Toxic"
- Nиkas - "From the Inside" (Russian: Изнутри)

2015

- Anri Jokhadze - "თოვლი მოდის" (Cinematographer)
- Mariam Chachkhiani - "Gibberish"
- Nina Sublatti - "Warrior" | This song represented Georgia in the Eurovision Song Contest 2015.
- Nina Sublatti - "I’ve Got An Idea"
- Nina Sublatti - "Dark Desire"

2016

- Mariam Chachkhiani feat. Jambazi - "Fly Away"
- Cool Company - "Slice of Paradise"

2017

- BB Thomaz - "Now You Want It"

2018

- Hamin Reed - "Disrelish"

2019

- Nitepunk - "We Go Back"
