= Midnight Gold =

2016 song by Nika Kocharov & Young Georgian Lolitaz

Single by Nika Kocharov & Young Georgian Lolitaz
- Released: 3 February 2016
- Recorded: 2016
- Studio: Red Bull Studios Berlin
- Genre: Indie rock, dance-punk, post-punk revival
- Songwriter(s): Kote Kalandadze; Thomas G:son

Eurovision Song Contest 2016 entry
- Country: Georgia
- Artist(s): Nika Kocharov & Young Georgian Lolitaz
- Language: English
- Composer(s): Kote Kalandadze, Thomas G:son
- Lyricist(s): Kote Kalandadze

Finals performance
- Semi-final result: 9th
- Semi-final points: 123
- Final result: 20th
- Final points: 104

Entry chronology
- ◄ "Warrior" (2015)
- "Keep the Faith" (2017) ►

Official performance video
- "Midnight Gold" (Second Semi-Final) on YouTube "Midnight Gold" (Grand Final) on YouTube

"Midnight Gold" is a song performed by Georgian indie rock band Nika Kocharov & Young Georgian Lolitaz. The song represented Georgia in the Eurovision Song Contest 2016.

== Background ==
The song speaks about "waking up the morning after", possibly from a hangover. The memories from last night are hazy, and while the singer tries to put together what happened from the night, he can't put it all together.

== Release ==
The song was released on 3 February 2016 to the public on GPB First Channel programme Komunikatori, along with the other four songs competing in the national final for Georgia.

== Eurovision Song Contest ==
=== Selection and national final ===
On 15 December 2015, the broadcaster held a press conference and announced that they had internally selected Nika Kocharov and the Young Georgian Lolitaz to represent Georgia in Stockholm. During the press conference, GPB announced that a national final would be held to select their song.

GPB opened a public song submission from 15 December 2015 until 8 January 2016. The broadcaster sought songs that fit the style of the selected musicians: "melodic song structure of alternative and indie rock with electronic beats, synths and/or samples, and club orientation of post-disco dance music." Over 100 songs were received by the submission deadline and an expert commission selected the top five songs from the received submissions. songs were presented to the public on 3 February 2016 via the GPB First Channel programme Komunikatori. The public was able to vote for their favourite song between 4 and 15 February 2016 through free televoting and internet voting. On February 15, it was announced that "Midnight Gold" had won the final, earning a total of 82.50 with 13 jury points and 1,310 votes from the internet.

=== At Eurovision ===
According to Eurovision rules, all nations with the exceptions of the host country and the "Big Five" (France, Germany, Italy, Spain and the United Kingdom) are required to qualify from one of two semi-finals in order to compete for the final; the top ten countries from each semi-final progress to the final. The European Broadcasting Union (EBU) split up the competing countries into six different pots based on voting patterns from previous contests, with countries with favourable voting histories put into the same pot. On 25 January 2016, a special allocation draw was held which placed each country into one of the two semi-finals, as well as which half of the show they would perform in. Georgia was placed into the second semi-final, to be held on 12 May 2016, and was scheduled to perform in the second half of the show.

In the semi-finals, "Midnight Gold" would earn a ninth-place finish with 123 points, earning a berth to the final.

In the final, "Midnight Gold" would earn a 20th place finish with 104 points.
