= The Mins =

Georgian rock band

- Origin: Tbilisi, Georgia
- Genres: Alternative rock, progressive rock
- Years active: 2011–2017
- Members: Zviad Mgebrishvili; Zaza Mgebrishvili; Shota Gvinepadze; Nika Abesadze; Daniel Adikashvili
- Website: www.themins.ge

The Mins are a Georgian Alternative / New Progressive Rock band founded in 2011 by Zviad Mgebrishvili. The band played its first live gig in 2011 on Altervision Newcomers, then started to work hard on its repertoire. They mostly perform original songs, with occasional covers. The main songwriter in the band is Zviad Mgebrishili. Some songs are also written by Shota Gvinepadze (keyboards). The band has made four music videos for the following songs: "Blind World", "O.W.L.", "My Lover is a Killer" and "I Don't Give a Foot". Zviad Mgebrishvili was successful in the TV show Akhali Khma [The Voice of Georgia] in 2013, making it through five stages of the show. The band has performed extensively at festivals and other events. The band had its first big solo concert in Tbilisi Eventhall 26 May 2014, performing its first EP, named "Blind World" and released in the same year with five songs. The band was support for Faithless at Tbilisi Summer Set 2014 and Archive at Tbilisi Open Air/Altervision 2015, where Placebo, Beth Hart and Black Label Society were the other headliners. Zaza Mgebrishvili left the band in 2015 and the new bass player and backing vocal is Nika Abesadze, who used to play with Zviad Mgebrishvili in the university rock-band Sunny Universe. The band recorded its debut album, "First Minute", at the Bravo Records studio for release in the winter of 2015.

== Lineup ==
- Zviad Mgebrishvili (singer, songwriter and lead guitar)
- Nika Abesadze (Bass, backing vocals)
- Daniel Adikashvili (Drums, backing vocals)
- Giorgi Tetsoshvili (Drums, Keyboard, samples)

== Sources ==
- Guests at morning show on Rustavi 2
- Tbilisi Live
- Guests at noon show
- guests at noon show on GDS
- Video Clip Presentation
- solo concert pre-coverage on MusicBox (Georgian music television channel)
- solo concert coverage on MusicBox
- presentation of the first single O.W.L.
- Coverage of one of the band's concerts
- first big coverage about the band
- Georgian National Broadcast
