= Warrior (Nina Sublatti song) =

2015 single by Nina Sublati

Single by Nina Sublatti
- Released: 11 March 2015
- Recorded: 2015
- Genre: Synthpop
- Length: 3:01
- Label: Georgian Public Broadcaster; Universal Music
- Songwriters: Nina Sublatti, Thomas G:son
- Producers: Nina Sublatti, Thomas G:son

Music video
- "Warrior" on YouTube

Eurovision Song Contest 2015 entry
- Country: Georgia
- Artist: Nina Sublatti
- Language: English
- Composers: Nina Sublatti, Thomas G:son
- Lyricist: Nina Sublatti

Finals performance
- Semi-final result: 4th
- Semi-final points: 98
- Final result: 11th
- Final points: 51

Entry chronology
- ◄ "Three Minutes to Earth" (2014)
- "Midnight Gold" (2016) ►

"Warrior" is a song performed by Georgian singer-songwriter Nina Sublatti. The song represented Georgia in the Eurovision Song Contest 2015.

In an interview ahead of the Georgian national final, Sublatti said she wrote the song during a three-hour period in the middle of the night. The song is about Georgian women who strive to be "good women, good mothers, good teachers." It also subliminally fought against the ongoing Russian occupation of Georgia.

On 28 January 2015 the Georgian Public Broadcaster announced that Sublatti would work with Swedish composer Thomas G:son ahead of her stage performance in Vienna.

== Critical reception ==
In a review of the Eurovision blog Wiwibloggs, the song received an overall score of 7.67/10 from a total of 29 jurors and was ranked 11th among the forty Eurovision 2015 participants. It received mostly positive reviews, but Patrick of Wiwibloggs awarded the song a 2/10 and stated "If you don’t have anything nice to say, then don’t say anything at all. I really don’t understand why people like this – it’s an ok song maybe but for me it’s nothing special. She may exude personal strength, but I don’t feel the strength in her voice, song or message. It’s dark but it’s too much. I really don’t like the song and she puts me off as a person. I’m not feeling Georgia once again." Among 29 jurors, 6 of them gave it a maximum score of 10/10. Sinan, one of the jurors who awarded the song a maximum score stated "Strong, different, painfully cool — this is fierce. Nina sings great live and I think she will do very well in Vienna. The video is just an accessory for the song, but it makes the whole package even more amazing. Slay kween!". Mikhail, another juror who also gave a maximum score to the song stated, "From the first listen this song has been “stucked in my mind“ [sic?]. It is powerful, energetic, and has some mystic energy. And what an amazing job Georgians did with the revamp! When I hear the very beginning, I think that the whole Mongol army is running at me! This is stunning! It captures you and you cannot take your ears/eyes off it. This warrior will slay in Vienna! Go Nina!"

== Music video ==
On 11 March 2015 the official music video, directed by David Gogokhia, was released. In this clip, the final version of the song was presented. Five other females who were also featured in the video were Nina Potskhishvili (a model from Look Models), Mariam Sanogo (a model from the Geomodels Agency), Keta Gavasheli, Lina Tsiklauri, and Dea Aptsiauri. A notable feature of the video is that the models also portray Tamar of Georgia, a Georgian National Hero who ruled Georgia as the first Queen Regnant.

== Live performance ==
On 10 April 2015 the final version of the song was performed live for the first time during the Eurovision Pre-Party held in Riga, Latvia. One week later, it was performed again on 18 April at the Eurovision In Concert event held in Amsterdam, Netherlands.

The song was performed last on 19 May at the first semi-final of the Eurovision Song Contest 2015 and qualified for the final. In the grand final, Nina performed "Warrior" in the 23rd position and finished in 11th place with 51 points. A smoke machine malfunction happened while she was performing live on the final night, causing her to disappear temporarily on the stage in a cloud of grey smoke.

== Track listings ==
- Digital download
1. "Warrior" – 3:02

== Charts ==
Chart (2015)	Peak position
Austria (Ö3 Austria Top 40)	73
Iceland (Tónlist)	44
Turkey (Number One Top 100)	2

== See also ==
- Georgia in the Eurovision Song Contest 2015
