= Belgium in the Eurovision Song Contest 2018 =

- Eurovision Song Contest 2018
- Participating broadcaster: Vlaamse Radio- en Televisieomroeporganisatie (VRT)
- Country: Belgium
- Selection process: Internal selection
- Announcement date: Artist: 28 September 2017; Song: 5 March 2018

Competing entry
- Song: "A Matter of Time"
- Artist: Sennek
- Songwriters: Laura Groeseneken; Alex Callier; Maxime Tribeche

Placement
- Semi-final result: Failed to qualify (12th)

Participation chronology

Belgium was represented at the Eurovision Song Contest 2018 with the song "A Matter of Time", written by Laura Groeseneken, Alex Callier, and Maxime Tribeche, and performed by Groeseneken herself under her stage name Sennek. The Belgian participating broadcaster, Flemish Vlaamse Radio- en Televisieomroeporganisatie (VRT), internally selected its entry for the contest. The artist was announced on 28 September 2017, and the song was presented to the public on 5 March 2018.

Belgium was drawn to compete in the first semi-final of the Eurovision Song Contest which took place on 8 May 2018. Performing during the show in position 4, "A Matter of Time" was not announced among the top 10 entries of the first semi-final and therefore did not qualify to compete in the final. It was later revealed that Belgium placed twelfth out of the 19 participating countries in the semi-final with 91 points.

== Background ==
Prior to the 2018 contest, Belgium had participated in the Eurovision Song Contest fifty-nine times since its debut as one of seven countries to take part in 1956. Since then, they have won the contest on one occasion in 1986 with the song "J'aime la vie", performed by Sandra Kim. Following the introduction of semi-finals for the 2004 contest, Belgium had been featured in only six finals. In 2017, "City Lights" by Blanche, qualified to the final and placed fourth.

The Belgian participation in the contest alternates between two broadcasters: Flemish Vlaamse Radio- en Televisieomroeporganisatie (VRT) and Walloon Radio-télévision belge de la Communauté française (RTBF) at the time, with both broadcasters sharing the broadcasting rights. Both broadcasters –and their predecessors– had selected the Belgian entry using national finals and internal selections in the past. In 2016, VRT organised the national final Eurosong in order to select the Belgian entry, while in 2017, RTBF internally selected a contestant from the reality singing competition The Voice Belgique to represent the nation. On 9 May 2017, VRT confirmed its participation in the 2018 contest and internally selected both the artist and song.

== Before Eurovision ==
=== Internal selection ===
The Belgian entry for the 2018 Eurovision Song Contest was selected via an internal selection by VRT. On 14 September 2017, the broadcaster's spokesperson Hans Van Goethem revealed that the artist would be selected by an A&R Team (Arts and Repertoire) consisting of music experts following conversations with several acts and that they were close to reaching a decision. On 28 September 2017, it was announced during the Één talk show Van Gils & Gasten that Laura Groeseneken (Sennek) would represent Belgium in Lisbon. Among artists that were previously rumoured to be selected for the competition included Belle Perez, De Romeo's, Isabelle A, Kate Ryan –who represented Belgium in 2006–, Natalia, and Ozark Henry. On 24 January 2018, Sennek revealed that the song she would perform at the contest, which she described as a "unique pop song with a mysterious feeling", was written and composed by herself.

The song, "A Matter of Time", was set to be presented to the public on 6 March 2018 during the radio MNM programme De Grote Peter Van de Veire Ochtendshow, however it was released on 5 March 2018 following an online leak. The song was written by Sennek herself along with member of the band Hooverphonic, Alex Callier, and Maxime Tribeche. In regards to the song, Sennek stated: "The song describes the way you can find beauty in transience, how you can see the beauty in something precious that gets broken."

=== Promotion ===
Sennek made several appearances across Europe to specifically promote "A Matter of Time" as the Belgian Eurovision entry. Between 8 and 11 April, Sennek took part in promotional activities in Tel Aviv, Israel and performed during the Israel Calling event held at the Rabin Square. On 14 April, Sennek performed during the Eurovision in Concert event which was held at the AFAS Live venue in Amsterdam, Netherlands and hosted by Edsilia Rombley and Cornald Maas. On 21 April, Sennek performed during the ESPreParty event which was held at the Sala La Riviera venue in Madrid, Spain and hosted by Soraya Arnelas.

== At Eurovision ==
According to Eurovision rules, all nations with the exceptions of the host country and the "Big Five" (France, Germany, Italy, Spain and the United Kingdom) are required to qualify from one of two semi-finals in order to compete for the final; the top ten countries from each semi-final progress to the final. The European Broadcasting Union (EBU) split up the competing countries into six different pots based on voting patterns from previous contests, with countries with favourable voting histories put into the same pot. On 29 January 2018, a special allocation draw was held which placed each country into one of the two semi-finals, as well as which half of the show they would perform in. Belgium was placed into the first semi-final, to be held on 8 May 2018, and was scheduled to perform in the first half of the show.

Once all the competing songs for the 2018 contest had been released, the running order for the semi-finals was decided by the shows' producers rather than through another draw, so that similar songs were not placed next to each other. Belgium was set to perform in position 4, following the entry from Albania and before the entry from the Czech Republic.

The two semi-finals and the final was broadcast in Belgium by both the Flemish and Walloon broadcasters. VRT broadcast the shows on één with commentary in Dutch by Peter Van de Veire. RTBF televised the shows on La Une with commentary in French by Jean-Louis Lahaye and Maureen Louys; the second semi-final aired on a 90-minute delay on La Une. The Belgian spokesperson, who announced the top 12-point score awarded by the Belgian jury during the final, was Danira Boukhriss.

=== Semi-final ===
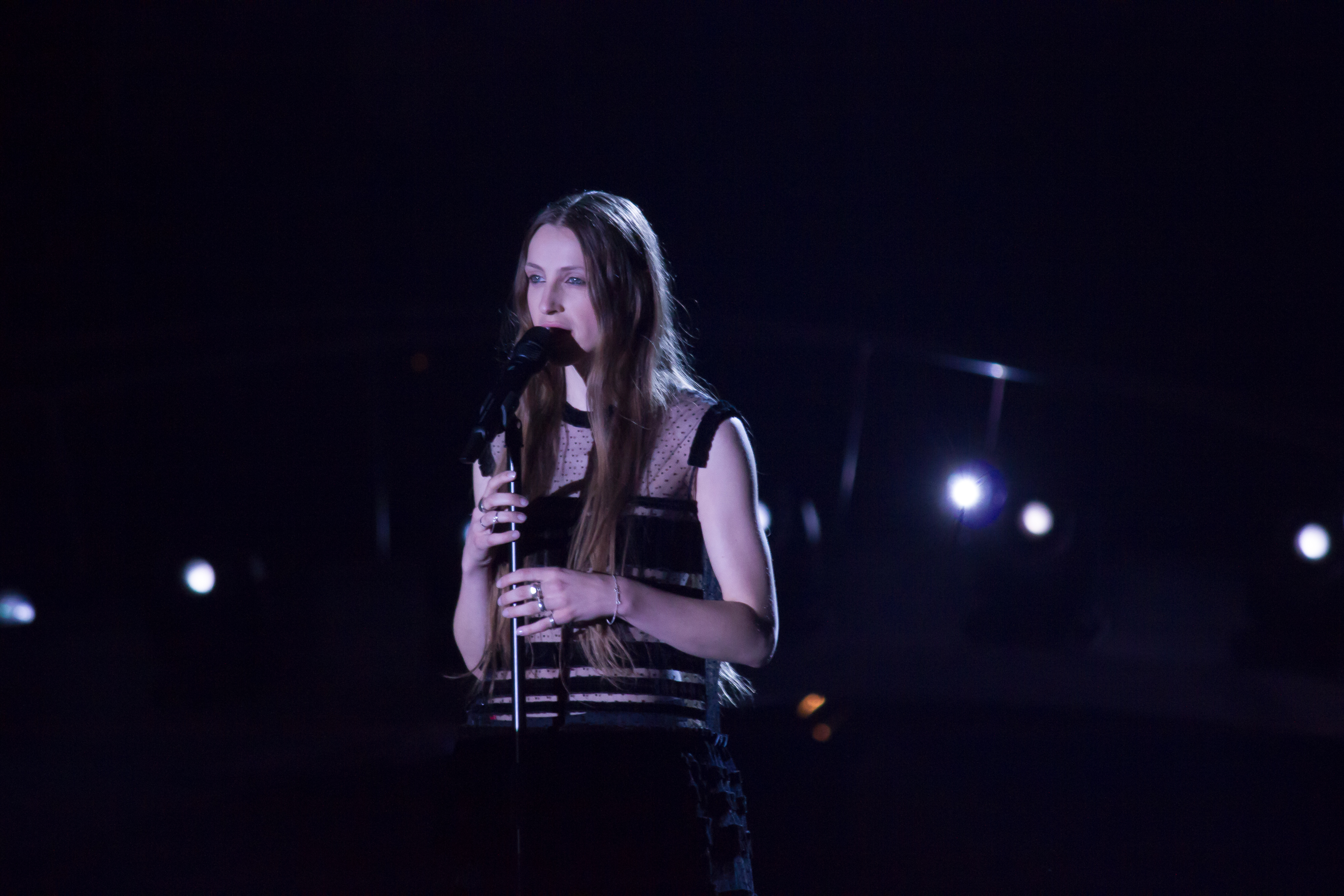
Sennek during a rehearsal before the first semi-final

Sennek took part in technical rehearsals on 29 April and 3 May, followed by dress rehearsals on 7 and 8 May. This included the jury show on 7 May where the professional juries of each country watched and voted on the competing entries.

The Belgian performance featured Sennek in a black transparent dress designed by Veronique Branquinho and performing on the outer ring of the stage. The performance began with a small panel of light that focused on Sennek's hands as she moved to reveal her eyes, while the stage remained dark throughout the song. The Belgian performance was directed by Hans Pannecoucke. Three off-stage backing vocalists joined Sennek during the performance: Monique Harcum, Nina Babet and Stef Caers, the latter of whom would go on to represent Belgium in 2023 under his stage name Gustaph.

At the end of the show, Belgium was not announced among the top 10 entries in the first semi-final and therefore failed to qualify to compete in the final. It was later revealed that Belgium placed twelfth in the semi-final, receiving a total of 91 points: 20 points from the televoting and 71 points from the juries.

=== Voting ===
Voting during the three shows involved each country awarding two sets of points from 1-8, 10 and 12: one from their professional jury and the other from televoting. Each nation's jury consisted of five music industry professionals who are citizens of the country they represent, with their names published before the contest to ensure transparency. This jury judged each entry based on: vocal capacity; the stage performance; the song's composition and originality; and the overall impression by the act. In addition, no member of a national jury was permitted to be related in any way to any of the competing acts in such a way that they cannot vote impartially and independently. The individual rankings of each jury member as well as the nation's televoting results were released shortly after the grand final.

Below is a breakdown of points awarded to Belgium and awarded by Belgium in the first semi-final and grand final of the contest, and the breakdown of the jury voting and televoting conducted during the two shows:

==== Points awarded to Belgium ====
Points awarded to Belgium (Semi-final 1)
Score	Televote	Jury
12 points		Bulgaria
10 points		Czech Republic; Portugal
8 points	Lithuania	Lithuania
7 points		Austria
6 points		Armenia
5 points		Finland
4 points		Albania; Estonia
3 points	Armenia; Estonia	
2 points	Azerbaijan; Belarus; Israel	Iceland; Ireland
1 point		Croatia

==== Points awarded by Belgium ====
Points awarded by Belgium (Semi-final 1)
Score	Televote	Jury
12 points	Ireland	Austria
10 points	Austria	Czech Republic
8 points	Czech Republic	Switzerland
7 points	Cyprus	Israel
6 points	Armenia	Armenia
5 points	Estonia	Ireland
4 points	Lithuania	Albania
3 points	Israel	Cyprus
2 points	Finland	Bulgaria
1 point	Greece	Iceland

Points awarded by Belgium (Final)
Score	Televote	Jury
12 points	Netherlands	Austria
10 points	Israel	Netherlands
8 points	France	Sweden
7 points	Cyprus	Czech Republic
6 points	Italy	Israel
5 points	Denmark	Germany
4 points	Ireland	Cyprus
3 points	Austria	France
2 points	Germany	Albania
1 point	Czech Republic	Spain

==== Detailed voting results ====
The following members comprised the Belgian jury:

- Bob Savenberg (jury chairperson) – singer, songwriter, musician, manager, represented Belgium in 1991 as part of Clouseau
- Wouter Vander Veken – music producer
- Laura Tesoro – singer, represented Belgium in 2016
- Tom Eeckhout (Tom Dice) – singer, songwriter, represented Belgium in 2010
- Nathalie Delporte – radio DJ

Detailed voting results from Belgium (Semi-final 1)
R/O	Country	Jury							Televote	
R/O	Country	W. V. Veken	L. Tesoro	T. Dice	B. Savenberg	N. Delporte	Rank	Points	Rank	Points
01	Azerbaijan	8	14	15	15	16	15		14	
02	Iceland	10	5	12	10	14	10	1	15	
03	Albania	12	2	4	9	10	7	4	11	
04	Belgium									
05	Czech Republic	4	3	3	2	4	2	10	3	8
06	Lithuania	14	13	10	11	11	13		7	4
07	Israel	5	9	6	3	3	4	7	8	3
08	Belarus	18	17	18	17	17	17		16	
09	Estonia	11	15	9	13	5	11		6	5
10	Bulgaria	9	6	11	8	13	9	2	12	
11	Macedonia	17	18	17	18	18	18		18	
12	Croatia	15	12	16	16	8	14		17	
13	Austria	1	1	1	1	1	1	12	2	10
14	Greece	16	16	14	14	15	16		10	1
15	Finland	13	11	13	7	9	12		9	2
16	Armenia	3	4	5	6	7	5	6	5	6
17	Switzerland	2	8	7	5	2	3	8	13	
18	Ireland	6	10	2	4	6	6	5	1	12
19	Cyprus	7	7	8	12	12	8	3	4	7

Detailed voting results from Belgium (Final)
R/O	Country	Jury							Televote	
R/O	Country	W. V. Veken	L. Tesoro	T. Dice	B. Savenberg	N. Delporte	Rank	Points	Rank	Points
01	Ukraine	20	23	18	19	22	24		24	
02	Spain	9	10	4	8	10	10	1	19	
03	Slovenia	25	21	19	18	21	25		25	
04	Lithuania	10	14	9	23	17	14		11	
05	Austria	1	1	1	1	1	1	12	8	3
06	Estonia	13	18	6	12	7	12		12	
07	Norway	14	13	14	13	8	13		14	
08	Portugal	18	15	26	20	11	17		17	
09	United Kingdom	19	19	20	14	12	16		18	
10	Serbia	22	22	25	25	23	26		26	
11	Germany	6	4	3	15	13	6	5	9	2
12	Albania	11	3	13	10	6	9	2	13	
13	France	23	16	5	7	3	8	3	3	8
14	Czech Republic	4	5	7	6	4	4	7	10	1
15	Denmark	12	9	21	22	26	15		6	5
16	Australia	16	20	15	26	25	21		21	
17	Finland	15	24	17	16	19	20		23	
18	Bulgaria	17	12	22	21	18	18		16	
19	Moldova	26	25	24	17	14	22		15	
20	Sweden	7	7	8	2	2	3	8	22	
21	Hungary	21	26	16	11	24	19		20	
22	Israel	5	8	11	5	5	5	6	2	10
23	Netherlands	3	2	2	3	15	2	10	1	12
24	Ireland	8	11	12	4	9	11		7	4
25	Cyprus	2	6	10	9	20	7	4	4	7
26	Italy	24	17	23	24	16	23		5	6
