= Croatia in the Eurovision Song Contest 2018 =

- Eurovision Song Contest 2018
- Country: Croatia
- Selection process: Internal selection
- Announcement date: Artist: 13 February 2018; Song: 6 March 2018

Competing entry
- Song: "Crazy"
- Artist: Franka Batelić
- Songwriters: Branimir Mihaljević; Franka Batelić

Placement
- Semi-final result: Failed to qualify (17th)

Participation chronology

Croatia was represented at the Eurovision Song Contest 2018 with the song "Crazy" written by Branimir Mihaljević and Franka Batelić. The song was performed by Franka, which is the artistic name of singer Franka Batelić who was selected internally by the Croatian broadcaster Croatian Radiotelevision (HRT) on 13 February 2018 to represent Croatia at the 2018 contest in Lisbon, Portugal. Her song "Crazy" was presented to the public on 6 March 2018.

Croatia was drawn to compete in the first semi-final of the Eurovision Song Contest which took place on 8 May 2018. Performing during the show in position 12, "Crazy" was not announced among the top 10 entries of the first semi-final and therefore did not qualify to compete in the final. It was later revealed that Croatia placed seventeenth out of the 19 participating countries in the semi-final with 63 points.

== Background ==
Prior to the 2017 contest, Croatia had participated in the Eurovision Song Contest twenty-two times since its first entry in 1993. The nation's best result in the contest was fourth, which it achieved on two occasions: in 1996 with the song "Sveta ljubav" performed by Maja Blagdan and in 1999 with the song "Marija Magdalena" performed by Doris Dragović. Following the introduction of semi-finals in 2004, Croatia had thus far featured in seven finals. After the Croatian entries failed to qualify from the semi-finals between 2010 and 2013, Croatia managed to qualify to the final in 2016 and 2017. In 2017, Croatia qualified with Jacques Houdek and the song "My Friend".

The Croatian national broadcaster, Croatian Radiotelevision (HRT), broadcasts the event within Croatia and organises the selection process for the nation's entry. HRT confirmed Croatia's participation in the 2018 Eurovision Song Contest on 11 September 2017. Between 1993 and 2011, HRT organised the national final Dora in order to select the Croatian entry for the Eurovision Song Contest. In 2012 and 2013, the broadcaster opted to internally select the entry. The Croatian broadcaster continued the internal selection procedure in 2016 and 2017 after missing the contest in 2014 and 2015. For their 2018 participation, a return of Dora was planned but later cancelled with the broadcaster internally selecting the entry.

== Before Eurovision ==
=== Internal selection ===
On 17 February 2018, the Croatian national broadcaster HRT announced that it had internally selected Franka Batelić to represent Croatia at the Eurovision Song Contest 2018, performing the song "Crazy". Franka Batelić previously attempted to represent Croatia at the Eurovision Song Contest in 2009 with "Pjesma za kraj" and in 2010 with "Na tvojim rukama", both of them placing seventh. Previously, Croatian media reported in January 2018 that three artists were considered by HRT to represent the nation: Damir Kedžo, Franka Batelić and Indira Levak.

"Crazy" was presented on 6 March 2018 along with the music video, directed by Sandra Mihaljević and Igor Ivanović, during the HRT news programme Dnevnik. The song was written by Franka herself and Branimir Mihaljević, and produced by Paul Norris in the United Kingdom. Branimir Mihaljević was also the co-writer of "Lako je sve", the Croatian Eurovision Song Contest entry in 2010. In regards to her song, Franka stated: "We came up with this song in an unexpected way. We recorded three songs in the studio as Eurovision suggestions, and this one suddenly came about. Branimir started playing it on the piano, I started singing the lyrics and the song came about. It simply worked as it was unusual and unexpected. The song is powerful, emotional, and modern. I hope the public will love it."

=== Controversy ===
Following the song presentation, Romanian singer Guez claimed on 30 March that "Crazy" had plagiarised his song "Ceea ce iubim". On 1 April, Franka's manager Siniša Bevanda issued a statement mentioning that they had worked on the production of the Croatian entry since December and that Guez had used the backing track of "Crazy" for his song instead. Following further accusations by Guez, producers Branimir Mihaljević and Denis Mevlja clarified that "Crazy" was created exclusively for the Eurovision Song Contest and that Mevlja had accidentally uploaded its instrumental for online purchase. Mevlja would also apologise for the mistake.

== At Eurovision ==
According to Eurovision rules, all nations with the exceptions of the host country and the "Big Five" (France, Germany, Italy, Spain and the United Kingdom) are required to qualify from one of two semi-finals in order to compete for the final; the top ten countries from each semi-final progress to the final. The European Broadcasting Union (EBU) split up the competing countries into six different pots based on voting patterns from previous contests, with countries with favourable voting histories put into the same pot. On 29 January 2018, a special allocation draw was held which placed each country into one of the two semi-finals, as well as which half of the show they would perform in. Croatia was placed into the first semi-final, to be held on 8 May 2018, and was scheduled to perform in the second half of the show.

Once all the competing songs for the 2018 contest had been released, the running order for the semi-finals was decided by the shows' producers rather than through another draw, so that similar songs were not placed next to each other. Croatia was set to perform in position 12, following the entry from Macedonia and before the entry from Austria.

The two semi-finals and the final were broadcast in Croatia on HRT 1 and via radio on HR 2 with commentary by Duško Ćurlić. The Croatian spokesperson, who announced the top 12-point score awarded by the Croatian jury during the final, was Uršula Tolj.

=== Semi-final ===
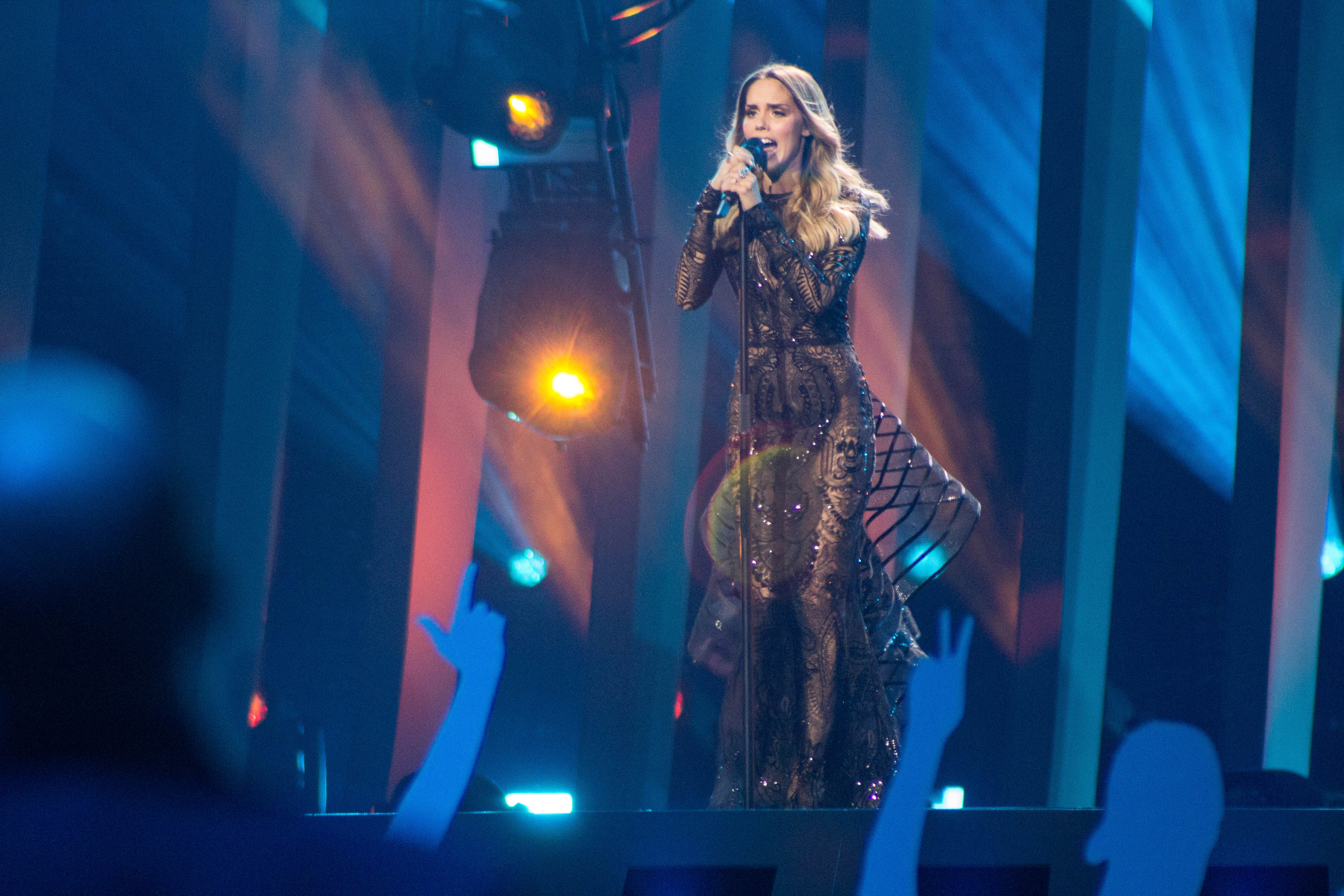
Franka during a rehearsal before the first semi-final

Franka took part in technical rehearsals on 30 April and 3 May, followed by dress rehearsals on 7 and 8 May. This included the jury show on 7 May where the professional juries of each country watched and voted on the competing entries.

The Croatian performance featured Franka in a black translucent frill trail dress designed by Nikica Ivančević and Vjeko Franetović. The stage lighting was in blue, red and black and the performance also featured several effects including smoke and a wind machine. The choreographer of the Croatian performance was Igor Barberić. Franka was joined by two off-stage backing vocalists: Djordjija Palić and Martina Ivanković.

At the end of the show, Croatia was not announced among the top 10 entries in the first semi-final and therefore failed to qualify to compete in the final. It was later revealed that Croatia placed seventeenth in the semi-final, receiving a total of 63 points: 17 points from the televoting and 46 points from the juries.

=== Voting ===
Voting during the three shows involved each country awarding two sets of points from 1-8, 10 and 12: one from their professional jury and the other from televoting. Each nation's jury consisted of five music industry professionals who are citizens of the country they represent, with their names published before the contest to ensure transparency. This jury judged each entry based on: vocal capacity; the stage performance; the song's composition and originality; and the overall impression by the act. In addition, no member of a national jury was permitted to be related in any way to any of the competing acts in such a way that they cannot vote impartially and independently. The individual rankings of each jury member as well as the nation's televoting results were released shortly after the grand final.

Below is a breakdown of points awarded to Croatia and awarded by Croatia in the first semi-final and grand final of the contest, and the breakdown of the jury voting and televoting conducted during the two shows:

==== Points awarded to Croatia ====
Points awarded to Croatia (Semi-final 1)
Score	Televote	Jury
12 points		
10 points	Macedonia	
8 points		Belarus
7 points		
6 points		Israel; Macedonia
5 points		Azerbaijan; Greece; United Kingdom
4 points	Switzerland	Bulgaria; Cyprus
3 points		
2 points	Austria	Estonia
1 point	Armenia	Portugal

==== Points awarded by Croatia ====
Points awarded by Croatia (Semi-final 1)
Score	Televote	Jury
12 points	Cyprus	Israel
10 points	Czech Republic	Czech Republic
8 points	Ireland	Lithuania
7 points	Austria	Ireland
6 points	Estonia	Bulgaria
5 points	Azerbaijan	Switzerland
4 points	Albania	Albania
3 points	Greece	Greece
2 points	Switzerland	Cyprus
1 point	Macedonia	Belgium

Points awarded by Croatia (Final)
Score	Televote	Jury
12 points	Serbia	Lithuania
10 points	Italy	Israel
8 points	Cyprus	Moldova
7 points	Slovenia	Bulgaria
6 points	Israel	France
5 points	Czech Republic	Norway
4 points	Albania	Czech Republic
3 points	Germany	Ireland
2 points	Denmark	United Kingdom
1 point	Bulgaria	Albania

==== Detailed voting results ====
The following members comprised the Croatian jury:

- Mustafa Softić (Muc; jury chairperson) – music producer, arranger
- Lara Antić Prskalo – singer (jury member in semi-final 1)
- Zdenka Kovačiček – singer
- Gina Damjanović – singer, songwriter
- Miroslav Lesić (Lesique) – musician, producer
- Kornelije Hećimović – radio producer (jury member in the final)

Detailed voting results from Croatia (Semi-final 1)
R/O	Country	Jury							Televote	
R/O	Country	L. Antić Prskalo	Z. Kovačiček	G. Damjanović	Muc	Lesique	Rank	Points	Rank	Points
01	Azerbaijan	13	18	16	9	10	17		6	5
02	Iceland	16	7	9	17	12	14		18	
03	Albania	10	16	7	4	6	7	4	7	4
04	Belgium	15	17	8	7	9	10	1	16	
05	Czech Republic	3	1	1	6	3	2	10	2	10
06	Lithuania	4	5	2	2	1	3	8	14	
07	Israel	1	3	3	1	2	1	12	11	
08	Belarus	18	9	15	12	18	18		15	
09	Estonia	5	15	12	14	13	12		5	6
10	Bulgaria	6	4	6	18	7	5	6	12	
11	Macedonia	14	6	17	16	16	16		10	1
12	Croatia									
13	Austria	12	14	5	13	14	11		4	7
14	Greece	2	13	10	15	8	8	3	8	3
15	Finland	9	11	13	10	11	13		13	
16	Armenia	11	8	14	11	15	15		17	
17	Switzerland	8	10	11	5	4	6	5	9	2
18	Ireland	7	2	4	8	17	4	7	3	8
19	Cyprus	17	12	18	3	5	9	2	1	12

Detailed voting results from Croatia (Final)
R/O	Country	Jury							Televote	
R/O	Country	Z. Kovačiček	G. Damjanović	Muc	Lesique	K. Hećimović	Rank	Points	Rank	Points
01	Ukraine	17	16	26	20	18	24		20	
02	Spain	11	17	8	7	24	15		19	
03	Slovenia	8	21	7	19	19	16		4	7
04	Lithuania	4	8	1	2	3	1	12	24	
05	Austria	7	6	12	18	26	14		11	
06	Estonia	16	13	21	25	7	18		13	
07	Norway	22	4	2	6	11	6	5	14	
08	Portugal	15	15	22	11	10	19		26	
09	United Kingdom	21	18	14	13	1	9	2	18	
10	Serbia	14	14	23	16	17	21		1	12
11	Germany	20	12	19	24	16	22		8	3
12	Albania	24	7	6	10	13	10	1	7	4
13	France	13	2	9	5	4	5	6	12	
14	Czech Republic	3	10	10	4	8	7	4	6	5
15	Denmark	23	26	25	14	14	23		9	2
16	Australia	2	24	15	22	20	12		17	
17	Finland	10	23	11	15	25	20		25	
18	Bulgaria	1	1	20	9	15	4	7	10	1
19	Moldova	9	11	4	1	5	3	8	22	
20	Sweden	12	5	13	12	12	13		23	
21	Hungary	26	22	24	23	21	26		16	
22	Israel	6	3	3	3	22	2	10	5	6
23	Netherlands	25	20	16	26	23	25		21	
24	Ireland	5	9	17	21	2	8	3	15	
25	Cyprus	18	25	5	8	9	11		3	8
26	Italy	19	19	18	17	6	17		2	10
