= Macedonia in the Eurovision Song Contest 2018 =

- Eurovision Song Contest 2018
- Country: Macedonia
- Selection process: Internal selection
- Announcement date: Artist: 13 February 2018; Song: 11 March 2018

Competing entry
- Song: "Lost and Found"
- Artist: Eye Cue
- Songwriters: Bojan Trajkovski; Darko Dimitrov

Placement
- Semi-final result: Failed to qualify (18th)

Participation chronology

Macedonia (Note: Officially under the provisional appellation "former Yugoslav Republic of Macedonia", abbreviated "FYR Macedonia".) was represented at the Eurovision Song Contest 2018 with the song "Lost and Found" written by Bojan Trajkovski and Darko Dimitrov. The song was performed by the group Eye Cue, which were internally selected by the Macedonian broadcaster Macedonian Radio Television (MRT) to compete for Macedonia at the 2018 contest in Lisbon, Portugal. Eye Cue's appointment as the Macedonian representative was announced on 13 February 2018, while their song, "Lost and Found", was presented to the public on 11 March 2018.

Macedonia was drawn to compete in the first semi-final of the Eurovision Song Contest which took place on 8 May 2018. Performing during the show in position 11, "Lost and Found" was not announced among the top 10 entries of the first semi-final and therefore did not qualify to compete in the final. It was later revealed that Macedonia placed eighteenth out of the 19 participating countries in the semi-final with 24 points.

== Background ==
Prior to the 2018 contest, Macedonia had participated in the Eurovision Song Contest seventeen times since its first entry in 1998. The nation's best result in the contest to this point was twelfth, which it achieved in 2006 with the song "Ninanajna" performed by Elena Risteska. Following the introduction of semi-finals for the 2004, Macedonia had featured in only five finals.

The Macedonian national broadcaster, Macedonian Radio Television (MRT), broadcasts the event within Macedonia and organises the selection process for the nation's entry. Macedonia had previously selected their entry for the Eurovision Song Contest through both national finals and internal selections. On 30 October 2017, the European Broadcasting Union (EBU) stated that the nation would not be allowed to participate at the 2018 Eurovision Song Contest as MRT no longer had access to their services due to the non-payment of debt amounting nearly 22 million euros. On 17 November 2017, MRT confirmed their intentions to participate at the 2018 contest after sanctions were lifted by the EBU. Between 2008 and 2011, Macedonia selected their entries using the national final Skopje Fest. During this period, the nation failed to qualify to the final on every occasion. Between 2012 and 2014, the broadcaster internally selected Macedonia's entry, resulting in a single qualification to the final during this period in 2012. After failing to qualify in 2015 where Skopje Fest was used as a national final, the broadcaster internally selected the nation's entry in 2016 and 2017. Both entries failed to bring the country to the final, including in 2017 with Jana Burčeska and the song "Dance Alone". For 2018, the broadcaster again opted to internally select the Macedonian entry.

== Before Eurovision ==
=== Internal selection ===
A submission period was opened for interested composers to submit their songs between 26 January 2018 and 8 February 2018. MRT received 382 submissions at the closing of the deadline. On 13 February 2018, the broadcaster announced that the band Eye Cue had been selected to represent Macedonia in Lisbon, performing the song "Lost and Found". The band consists of vocalists Bojan Trajkovski and Marija Ivanovska, and drummer Ivo Mitkovski. "Lost and Found" was written and composed by Trajkovski together with Darko Dimitrov, and was selected from 12 shortlisted songs by an eight-member committee consisting of Meri Popova (MRT 1), Karolina Petkovska (MRT 1), Aleksandra Jovanovska (MRT 1), Avni Qahili (MRT 2), Branka Kostić-Marković (music journalist and critic), Andrijana Jovanovska (reporter.mk), Marko Mark (Channel 77 and Telma) and Antonio Dimitrievski (vistina.mk).

On 11 March 2018, "Lost and Found" was presented to the public along with the official music video, directed by Jovan Kucinovski, during the MRT evening news programme Dnevnik 2. In regards to the song, Bojan Trajkovski stated: "It is a song about deep and unconditional love where one can dive deeper into the world of the unknown and experience the magic of true and powerful love. I hope Eurovision viewers will enjoy the cheerful melody and the charming vocals of Marija."

When I first heard the song, Bojan was playing it on the piano and I instantly liked it, I felt the emotion right away. It took only 20 seconds to fall in love with this melody, I hope the audience will react the same way as I did. I am really excited that I will perform this song on the Eurovision stage and will have a chance to share my emotions with everyone.

— Marija Ivanovska

=== Promotion ===
Eye Cue made several appearances across Europe to specifically promote "Lost and Found" as the Macedonian Eurovision entry. Between 8 and 11 April, Eye Cue took part in promotional activities in Tel Aviv, Israel and performed during the Israel Calling event held at the Rabin Square. On 14 April, Eye Cue performed during the Eurovision in Concert event which was held at the AFAS Live venue in Amsterdam, Netherlands and hosted by Edsilia Rombley and Cornald Maas. On 21 April, Eye Cue performed during the ESPreParty event on 21 April which was held at the Sala La Riviera venue in Madrid, Spain and hosted by Soraya Arnelas.

== At Eurovision ==
According to Eurovision rules, all nations with the exceptions of the host country and the "Big Five" (France, Germany, Italy, Spain and the United Kingdom) are required to qualify from one of two semi-finals in order to compete for the final; the top ten countries from each semi-final progress to the final. The European Broadcasting Union (EBU) split up the competing countries into six different pots based on voting patterns from previous contests, with countries with favourable voting histories put into the same pot. On 29 January 2018, a special allocation draw was held which placed each country into one of the two semi-finals, as well as which half of the show they would perform in. Macedonia was placed into the first semi-final, to be held on 8 May 2018, and was scheduled to perform in the second half of the show.

Once all the competing songs for the 2018 contest had been released, the running order for the semi-finals was decided by the shows' producers rather than through another draw, so that similar songs were not placed next to each other. Macedonia was set to perform in position 11, following the entry from Bulgaria and before the entry from Croatia.

The two semi-finals and final were broadcast in Macedonia on MRT 1, MRT 2 and Macedonian Radio with commentary by Karolina Petkovska. The Macedonian spokesperson, who announced the top 12-point score awarded by the Macedonian jury during the final, was 2017 Macedonian Eurovision representative Jana Burčeska.

=== Semi-final ===
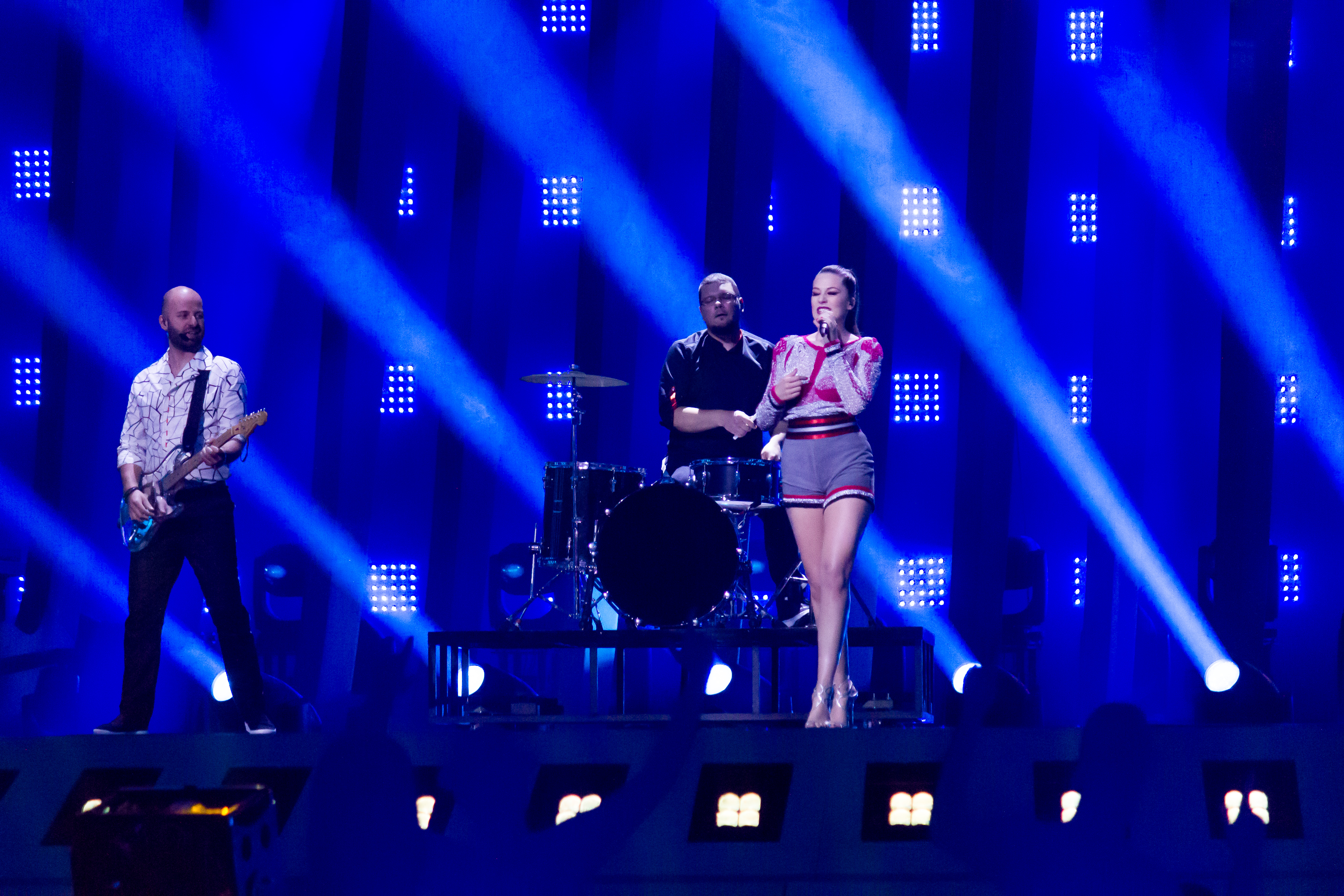
Eye Cue during a rehearsal before the first semi-final

Eye Cue took part in technical rehearsals on 30 April and 3 May, followed by dress rehearsals on 7 and 8 May. This included the jury show on 7 May where the professional juries of each country watched and voted on the competing entries.

The Macedonian performance featured the members of Eye Cue performing on stage; Marija Ivanovska wore a short metallic pink dress which she later removed to reveal a grey and pink netted top with grey denim shorts, while Bojan Trajkovski wore a white patterned shirt and black pants. The band was joined on stage by three dancers, which also performed backing vocals, in black body suits with pink and orange frills. During the first chorus, Ivanovska joined the backing performers to perform a synchronised routine. The stage colours were predominately pink, blue and yellow with the performers ending the song at the stage bridge. The three backing performers were Antonia Gigovska, Dina Jashari and Valery Dimovska.

At the end of the show, Macedonia was not announced among the top 10 entries in the second semi-final and therefore failed to qualify to compete in the final. It was later revealed that Macedonia placed eighteenth in the semi-final, receiving a total of 24 points: 6 points from the televoting and 18 points from the juries.

=== Voting ===
Voting during the three shows involved each country awarding two sets of points from 1-8, 10 and 12: one from their professional jury and the other from televoting. Each nation's jury consisted of five music industry professionals who are citizens of the country they represent, with their names published before the contest to ensure transparency. This jury judged each entry based on: vocal capacity; the stage performance; the song's composition and originality; and the overall impression by the act. In addition, no member of a national jury was permitted to be related in any way to any of the competing acts in such a way that they cannot vote impartially and independently. The individual rankings of each jury member as well as the nation's televoting results were released shortly after the grand final.

Below is a breakdown of points awarded to Macedonia and awarded by Macedonia in the second semi-final and grand final of the contest, and the breakdown of the jury voting and televoting conducted during the two shows:

==== Points awarded to Macedonia ====
Points awarded to Macedonia (Semi-final 1)
Score	Televote	Jury
12 points		
10 points		
8 points		Albania
7 points		
6 points		Azerbaijan
5 points	Bulgaria	
4 points		
3 points		Greece
2 points		
1 point	Croatia	Israel

==== Points awarded by Macedonia ====
Points awarded by Macedonia (Semi-final 1)
Score	Televote	Jury
12 points	Albania	Bulgaria
10 points	Croatia	Albania
8 points	Bulgaria	Czech Republic
7 points	Cyprus	Azerbaijan
6 points	Czech Republic	Croatia
5 points	Azerbaijan	Israel
4 points	Greece	Estonia
3 points	Israel	Cyprus
2 points	Finland	Iceland
1 point	Switzerland	Ireland

Points awarded by Macedonia (Final)
Score	Televote	Jury
12 points	Albania	Estonia
10 points	Serbia	Cyprus
8 points	Cyprus	Serbia
7 points	Bulgaria	Sweden
6 points	Italy	Albania
5 points	Czech Republic	Finland
4 points	Ukraine	Czech Republic
3 points	Israel	Germany
2 points	Slovenia	Slovenia
1 point	Moldova	Israel

==== Detailed voting results ====
The following members comprised the Macedonian jury:

- Miodrag Vrčakovski (jury chairperson) – songwriter, radio journalist
- Ile Spasev – music teacher, composer, music producer
- Ana Pandevska – composer
- Kristijan Gabrovski – composer, music producer
- Stefanija Leškova Zelenovska – musicologist, music journalist

Detailed voting results from Macedonia (Semi-final 1)
R/O	Country	Jury							Televote	
R/O	Country	I. Spasev	A. Pandevska	M. Vrčakovski	K. Gabrovski	S. Leškova Zelenovska	Rank	Points	Rank	Points
01	Azerbaijan	5	1	11	5	4	4	7	6	5
02	Iceland	9	6	10	9	8	9	2	17	
03	Albania	2	4	7	1	1	2	10	1	12
04	Belgium	13	16	14	15	16	17		15	
05	Czech Republic	4	2	1	2	7	3	8	5	6
06	Lithuania	16	13	18	11	14	16		16	
07	Israel	8	8	2	6	3	6	5	8	3
08	Belarus	17	18	17	10	11	13		14	
09	Estonia	6	9	5	7	6	7	4	12	
10	Bulgaria	1	3	3	3	2	1	12	3	8
11	Macedonia									
12	Croatia	3	5	6	4	5	5	6	2	10
13	Austria	14	17	15	16	17	18		11	
14	Greece	15	12	8	18	18	11		7	4
15	Finland	11	15	12	14	13	12		9	2
16	Armenia	12	11	16	17	15	15		18	
17	Switzerland	18	14	13	13	12	14		10	1
18	Ireland	10	10	9	12	9	10	1	13	
19	Cyprus	7	7	4	8	10	8	3	4	7

Detailed voting results from Macedonia (Final)
R/O	Country	Jury							Televote	
R/O	Country	I. Spasev	A. Pandevska	M. Vrčakovski	K. Gabrovski	S. Leškova Zelenovska	Rank	Points	Rank	Points
01	Ukraine	13	20	13	18	22	24		7	4
02	Spain	15	24	16	17	23	25		19	
03	Slovenia	14	3	8	7	19	9	2	9	2
04	Lithuania	24	7	26	21	13	22		25	
05	Austria	16	16	17	9	5	17		14	
06	Estonia	5	1	6	6	6	1	12	17	
07	Norway	18	19	7	5	17	15		13	
08	Portugal	26	23	20	20	21	26		26	
09	United Kingdom	25	14	18	19	1	13		22	
10	Serbia	1	4	12	13	10	3	8	2	10
11	Germany	8	10	19	2	14	8	3	11	
12	Albania	6	6	10	3	12	5	6	1	12
13	France	19	9	11	26	16	21		16	
14	Czech Republic	20	11	1	14	7	7	4	6	5
15	Denmark	22	18	23	15	11	23		12	
16	Australia	3	22	15	10	20	14		15	
17	Finland	21	5	9	16	2	6	5	20	
18	Bulgaria	17	8	5	25	15	16		4	7
19	Moldova	23	26	3	4	26	11		10	1
20	Sweden	2	15	14	11	3	4	7	18	
21	Hungary	11	21	21	8	25	20		23	
22	Israel	7	12	2	24	24	10	1	8	3
23	Netherlands	10	13	24	12	8	18		24	
24	Ireland	9	25	25	23	9	19		21	
25	Cyprus	4	2	4	22	4	2	10	3	8
26	Italy	12	17	22	1	18	12		5	6
