= Azerbaijan in the Eurovision Song Contest 2018 =

- Eurovision Song Contest 2018
- Country: Azerbaijan
- Selection process: Internal selection
- Announcement date: Artist: 8 November 2017; Song: 4 March 2018

Competing entry
- Song: "X My Heart"
- Artist: Aisel
- Songwriters: Dimitris Kontopoulos; Sandra Bjurman

Placement
- Semi-final result: Failed to qualify (11th)

Participation chronology

Azerbaijan was represented at the Eurovision Song Contest 2018 with the song "X My Heart" written by Dimitris Kontopoulos and Sandra Bjurman. The song was performed by Aisel, who was internally selected by the Azerbaijani broadcaster İctimai Television (İTV) to represent the nation at the 2018 contest in Lisbon, Portugal. Aisel's selection as the Azerbaijani Eurovision entrant was announced on 8 November 2017, while the song "X My Heart" was presented to the public on 4 March 2018.

Azerbaijan was drawn to compete in the first semi-final of the Eurovision Song Contest which took place on 8 May 2018. Performing as the opening entry for the show in position 1, "X My Heart" was not announced among the top 10 entries of the first semi-final and therefore did not qualify to compete in the final. This marked the first time that Azerbaijan failed to qualify to the final of the Eurovision Song Contest from a semi-final since its first entry in 2008. It was later revealed that Azerbaijan placed eleventh out of the 18 participating countries in the semi-final with 94 points.

== Background ==
Prior to the 2018 contest, Azerbaijan had participated in the Eurovision Song Contest ten times since its first entry in 2008. Azerbaijan had won the contest on one occasion in 2011 with the song "Running Scared" performed by Ell and Nikki. Since their debut in 2008, Azerbaijan has had a string of successful results, qualifying to the final and placing in the top ten each year until 2014, including a third-place result in 2009 with the song "Always" performed by AySel and Arash and a second-place result in 2013 with the song "Hold Me" performed by Farid Mammadov. However, in 2014, Azerbaijan achieved their lowest placing in the contest to this point, placing 22nd in the final with the song "Start a Fire" performed by Dilara Kazimova. In 2017, Azerbaijan placed fourteenth with the song "Skeletons" performed by Dihaj.

The Azerbaijani national broadcaster, İctimai Television (İTV), broadcasts the event within Azerbaijan and organises the selection process for the nation's entry. İTV confirmed their intentions to participate at the 2018 Eurovision Song Contest on 11 August 2017. Azerbaijan had used various methods to select the Azerbaijani entry in the past, including internal selections of both the artist and song, as well as national finals to select their artist followed by an internal selection to determine the song. Between 2011 and 2013, Azerbaijan organized a national final titled Milli Seçim Turu to select the performer, song or both for Eurovision. In 2014, the broadcaster utilised an existing talent show format titled Böyük Səhnə where the winning performer would subsequently be given an internally selected song. Since 2015, the broadcaster internally selected both the artist and song that represented Azerbaijan, a procedure which continued for the selection of their 2018 entry.

== Before Eurovision ==
=== Internal selection ===
Both the artist and song that represented Azerbaijan at the Eurovision Song Contest 2018 was selected internally by İTV. On 8 November 2017, the broadcaster announced that a national jury panel had selected Aisel as the Azerbaijani Eurovision contestant. On 3 March 2018, İTV announced that Aisel would be performing the song "X My Heart". The selection of the song was based on the decision of İTV and participants of an opinion survey that featured 300 music and television industry experts as well as Eurovision fans from 31 European countries; "X My Heart" received the most positive votes among three shortlisted entries with 87%. "X My Heart" was written by Dimitris Kontopoulos and Sandra Bjurman, and was presented on 4 March 2018 via the streaming service provider Spotify. The official music video was later released on 7 March 2018. In regards to the song, Aisel stated: "I feel a strong connection with the lyrics of the song, since believing in myself made me overcome several difficulties I had in my life. This is a message I want to send to everyone: believing in yourself can make you stronger than cannonballs."

=== Promotion ===
Aisel made several appearances across Europe to specifically promote "X My Heart" as the Azerbaijani Eurovision entry. On 7 April, Aisel performed during the Eurovision Pre-Party, which was held at the VEGAS Kuntsevo shopping mall in Moscow, Russia. Between 8 and 11 April, Aisel took part in promotional activities in Tel Aviv, Israel and performed during the Israel Calling event held at the Rabin Square. On 18 April, Aisel performed "X My Heart" during the bTV talk show programme Slavi's Show in Bulgaria.

== At Eurovision ==
According to Eurovision rules, all nations with the exceptions of the host country and the "Big Five" (France, Germany, Italy, Spain and the United Kingdom) are required to qualify from one of two semi-finals in order to compete for the final; the top ten countries from each semi-final progress to the final. The European Broadcasting Union (EBU) split up the competing countries into six different pots based on voting patterns from previous contests, with countries with favourable voting histories put into the same pot. On 29 January 2018, a special allocation draw was held which placed each country into one of the two semi-finals, as well as which half of the show they would perform in. Azerbaijan was placed into the first semi-final, to be held on 8 May 2018, and was scheduled to perform in the first half of the show.

Once all the competing songs for the 2018 contest had been released, the running order for the semi-finals was decided by the shows' producers rather than through another draw, so that similar songs were not placed next to each other. Azerbaijan was set to open the show and perform in position 1, before the entry from Iceland.

The two semi-finals and final were broadcast in Azerbaijan on İTV with commentary by Azer Suleymanli. The Azerbaijani spokesperson, who announced the top 12-point score awarded by the Azerbaijani jury during the final, was Tural Asadov.

=== Semi-final ===
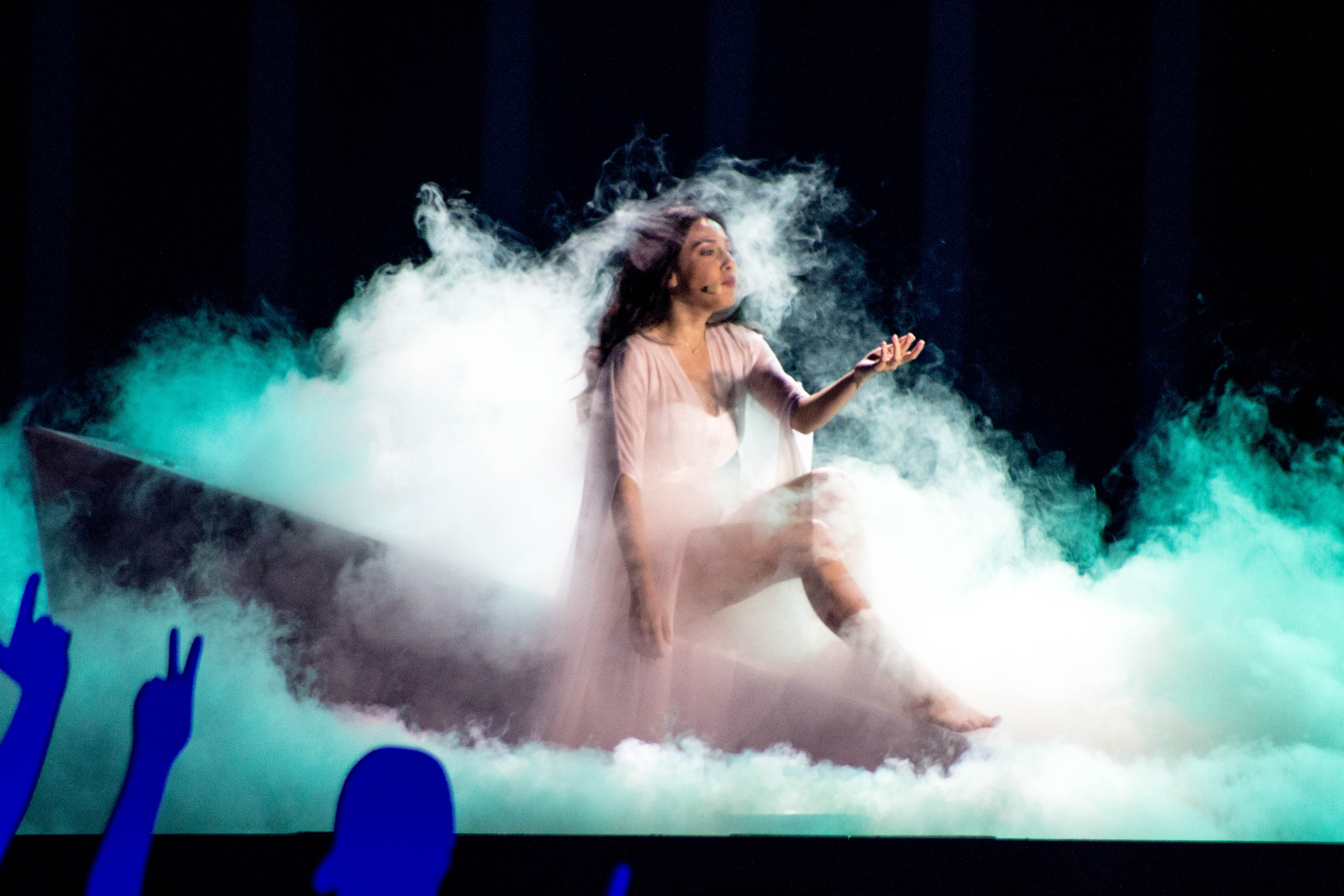
Aisel during a rehearsal before the first semi-final

Aisel took part in technical rehearsals on 29 April and 3 May, followed by dress rehearsals on 7 and 8 May. This included the jury show on 7 May where the professional juries of each country watched and voted on the competing entries.

The Azerbaijani performance featured Aisel performing with four backing vocalists/dancers, all dressed in white. The performance featured Aisel moving around triangular slabs that light up in white LEDs as well as the use of smoke effects and augmented reality that displayed a glittery effect. The performance was directed by Fokas Evangelinos. The four backing vocalists/dancers that joined Aisel on stage were Hugo Baptista, Rui Andrade, Salomé Caldeira and Sandra d'Andrade. An additional off-stage backing vocalist, Stefania Rizou, was also part of the performance.

At the end of the show, Azerbaijan was not announced among the top 10 entries in the first semi-final and therefore failed to qualify to compete in the final. This marked the first time that Azerbaijan failed to qualify to the final of the Eurovision Song Contest from a semi-final since its first entry in 2008. It was later revealed that Azerbaijan placed eleventh in the semi-final, receiving a total of 94 points: 47 points from both the televoting and the juries.

=== Voting ===
Voting during the three shows involved each country awarding two sets of points from 1–8, 10 and 12: one from their professional jury and the other from televoting. Each nation's jury consisted of five music industry professionals who are citizens of the country they represent, with their names published before the contest to ensure transparency. This jury judged each entry based on: vocal capacity; the stage performance; the song's composition and originality; and the overall impression by the act. In addition, no member of a national jury was permitted to be related in any way to any of the competing acts in such a way that they cannot vote impartially and independently. The individual rankings of each jury member as well as the nation's televoting results were released shortly after the grand final.

Below is a breakdown of points awarded to Azerbaijan and awarded by Azerbaijan in the first semi-final and grand final of the contest, and the breakdown of the jury voting and televoting conducted during the two shows:

==== Points awarded to Azerbaijan ====
Points awarded to Azerbaijan (Semi-final 1)
Score	Televote	Jury
12 points		Greece
10 points	Czech Republic	Cyprus; Israel
8 points		
7 points	Albania; Portugal	Macedonia
6 points		
5 points	Croatia; Israel; Macedonia	Albania
4 points	Austria	
3 points	Greece	Estonia
2 points		
1 point	Iceland	

==== Points awarded by Azerbaijan ====
Points awarded by Azerbaijan (Semi-final 1)
Score	Televote	Jury
12 points	Belarus	Belarus
10 points	Israel	Greece
8 points	Czech Republic	Cyprus
7 points	Cyprus	Albania
6 points	Ireland	Macedonia
5 points	Austria	Croatia
4 points	Bulgaria	Israel
3 points	Estonia	Switzerland
2 points	Belgium	Bulgaria
1 point	Lithuania	Estonia

Points awarded by Azerbaijan (Final)
Score	Televote	Jury
12 points	Israel	Albania
10 points	Cyprus	Serbia
8 points	Ukraine	Hungary
7 points	Norway	Moldova
6 points	Czech Republic	Ukraine
5 points	Italy	Bulgaria
4 points	Moldova	Cyprus
3 points	Germany	Estonia
2 points	Sweden	Germany
1 point	Bulgaria	Israel

==== Detailed voting results ====
The following members comprised the Azerbaijani jury:

- Mubariz Tagiyev (jury chairperson) – singer
- Faig Aghayev – singer
- Ilaha Efendiyeva-Khalilova – young soloist of the Azerbaijan State Academic Opera and Ballet Theater, soprano
- Tunzala Gahraman – jazz singer
- Nurlana Jafarova – TV presenter

Detailed voting results from Azerbaijan (Semi-final 1)
R/O	Country	Jury							Televote	
R/O	Country	F. Aghayev	M. Tagiyev	I. Efendiyeva-Khalilova	T. Gahraman	N. Jafarova	Rank	Points	Rank	Points
01	Azerbaijan									
02	Iceland	14	12	13	13	14	13		15	
03	Albania	2	3	7	2	4	4	7	11	
04	Belgium	17	17	17	16	17	17		9	2
05	Czech Republic	12	13	12	11	13	12		3	8
06	Lithuania	16	16	16	17	16	16		10	1
07	Israel	8	6	5	7	7	7	4	2	10
08	Belarus	1	1	2	4	3	1	12	1	12
09	Estonia	11	10	9	10	10	10	1	8	3
10	Bulgaria	9	9	10	9	9	9	2	7	4
11	Macedonia	4	4	1	5	6	5	6	17	
12	Croatia	6	8	3	6	5	6	5	16	
13	Austria	15	15	15	14	15	15		6	5
14	Greece	5	2	4	3	1	2	10	13	
15	Finland	13	14	14	15	12	14		14	
16	Armenia	18	18	18	18	18	18		18	
17	Switzerland	7	7	8	8	8	8	3	12	
18	Ireland	10	11	11	12	11	11		5	6
19	Cyprus	3	5	6	1	2	3	8	4	7

Detailed voting results from Azerbaijan (Final)
R/O	Country	Jury							Televote	
R/O	Country	F. Aghayev	M. Tagiyev	I. Efendiyeva-Khalilova	T. Gahraman	N. Jafarova	Rank	Points	Rank	Points
01	Ukraine	9	7	2	8	5	5	6	3	8
02	Spain	18	15	10	14	11	14		24	
03	Slovenia	7	11	15	13	24	11		25	
04	Lithuania	24	13	20	11	20	20		16	
05	Austria	14	12	11	20	8	12		15	
06	Estonia	19	14	4	6	7	8	3	11	
07	Norway	17	6	25	16	18	13		4	7
08	Portugal	16	26	26	17	26	23		26	
09	United Kingdom	20	19	19	23	16	22		18	
10	Serbia	5	1	3	1	4	2	10	21	
11	Germany	10	16	13	5	10	9	2	8	3
12	Albania	1	2	1	4	3	1	12	19	
13	France	21	20	21	15	19	21		12	
14	Czech Republic	13	8	23	18	17	16		5	6
15	Denmark	25	17	18	25	22	24		13	
16	Australia	26	9	22	21	13	19		23	
17	Finland	12	18	14	9	23	15		22	
18	Bulgaria	6	4	8	10	6	6	5	10	1
19	Moldova	4	5	6	3	2	4	7	7	4
20	Sweden	8	21	17	19	15	17		9	2
21	Hungary	2	3	7	2	1	3	8	17	
22	Israel	11	10	12	12	12	10	1	1	12
23	Netherlands	23	25	16	26	21	25		14	
24	Ireland	22	22	24	22	25	26		20	
25	Cyprus	3	24	5	7	9	7	4	2	10
26	Italy	15	23	9	24	14	18		6	5
