= Greece in the Eurovision Song Contest 2018 =

- Eurovision Song Contest 2018
- Participating broadcaster: Hellenic Broadcasting Corporation (ERT)
- Country: Greece
- Selection process: Internal selection
- Announcement date: 16 February 2018

Competing entry
- Song: "Oniro mou"
- Artist: Yianna Terzi
- Songwriters: Aris Kalimeris; Dimitris Stamatiou; Yianna Terzi; Mihalis Papathanasiou

Placement
- Semi-final result: Failed to qualify (14th)

Participation chronology

Greece was represented at the Eurovision Song Contest 2018 with the song "Oniro mou", written by Aris Kalimeris, Dimitris Stamatiou, Yianna Terzi, and Mihalis Papathanasiou, and performed by Terzi herself. The Greek participating broadcaster, the Hellenic Broadcasting Corporation (ERT), internally selected its entry for the contest. A national final was scheduled to be held in order to select the entry. Five entries were to compete in the final on 22 February 2018 where public voting would exclusively select the winner, however "Oniro mou" performed by Terzi was announced as the Greek entry on 16 February 2018 following the disqualification of four out of the five national final entries.

To promote the entry, a music video for the song was released and Terzi performed the song at both the fashion music series MADwalk and the Eurovision Live Lounge series hosted by ESCToday. Greece was drawn to compete in the first semi-final of the Eurovision Song Contest which took place on 8 May 2018. Performing fourteenth in the running order for the night, "Oniro mou" was not announced among the top 10 entries of the first semi-final and therefore did not qualify to compete in the final. It was later revealed that Greece placed fourteenth out of the 19 participating countries in its semi-final with 81 points.

== Background ==
Prior to the 2018 contest, Greece had participated in the Eurovision Song Contest 38 times since their debut in 1974. To this point, they won the contest once, in 2005 with the song "My Number One" performed by Helena Paparizou. Following the introduction of semi-finals for the 2004 contest, Greece managed to qualify for the final with each of their entries for several years. Between 2004 and 2013, the nation achieved nine top ten placements in the final. To this point, "Utopian Land" by Argo in 2016 failed to qualify from the semi-finals for the first time ever, being absent from the final for the first time since 2000 and marking Greece's worst result at the contest.

As part of its duties as participating broadcaster, the Hellenic Broadcasting Corporation (ERT) organises the selection of its entry in the Eurovision Song Contest and broadcasts the event in the country. ERT's predecessor, the National Radio Television Foundation (EIRT), debuted in the contest in 1974 and then ERT participated from 1975 until 2013, when it was shut down by a government directive and replaced with the interim Dimosia Tileorasi (DT) and later by the New Hellenic Radio, Internet and Television (NERIT) broadcaster. During this time, from 2013 through 2015, the Greek television station MAD TV organised the selection process. On 28 April 2015, a legislative proposal that resulted in the renaming of NERIT to ERT was approved and signed into law by the Hellenic Parliament; ERT began broadcasting once again on 11 June 2015, and shortly after confirmed their intentions to once again participate in the Eurovision Song Contest.

The Greek broadcaster has used various methods to select its entry in the past, such as internal selections and televised national finals, to choose the performer, song or both to compete at Eurovision. Despite its desire for a full national final for the previous year's entry, the broadcaster eventually went with an internally selected entrant and a song selected by a national final. For 2018, ERT once again announced a national final to select its entry.

== Before Eurovision ==
=== Cancelled national final plans ===
On 1 October 2017, the ERT announced that it would be selecting its performer and song through a national final. A submission period was opened in early October 2017, where record labels were able to submit their proposed artists and composers until 20 October, a deadline which was later extended by one week to 27 October. Artists were required to be signed to record labels, while songs had to be performed in the Greek language and contain a native sound. If a suitable number of high quality entries were received, the broadcaster then planned to have the ultimate choice determined solely by a public vote. An eight-member artistic committee reviewed the entries and consisted of Anastasios Symeonidis (chairperson), Petros Dourdoubakis (songwriter and radio producer), Dimitris Ktistakis (conductor), Alexis Kostas, Mihalis Messinis (composer), Andreas Pylarinos (conductor), Giannis Spyropoulos (orchestrator) and Tsaras Pantazis (radio producer).

Twenty entries were received by the submission deadline and the artistic committee selected five candidate entries to participate in the national final. These participants were announced on 8 November 2017. A week later on 14 November, "Idio tempo" performed by Duo Fina and "Baila jazz" performed by Tony Vlahos were disqualified from the national final as their songs did not contain a native sound. At this point, ERT continued to pursue a national final where the three remaining entries were to compete. The event was scheduled to take place on 22 February 2018 and be hosted by Panagiotis Kountouras and Nikos Pitanios. Each entrant would perform live with the winner selected exclusively by a public vote. As announced, the three record labels would also need to guarantee €90,000 to cover the expenses of the participation if their candidate was chosen.

Artists picked to participate in the selection Disqualified artists

Candidate entries
Artist	Song	Label
Areti Ketime	"Min ksehnas ton ilio" (Μην ξεχνάς τον ήλιο)	The Spicy Effect
Chorostalites	"Apo tin Thraki eos tin Kriti" (Από την Θράκη ως την Κρήτη)	Spider Music
Christina Salti	"To s'agapo" (Το σ'αγαπώ)	Panik Records
Decho	"I idia zali" (Η ίδια ζάλη)	Minos EMI
Dimitris Kiklis	"Odos agapis" (Οδός αγάπης)	Vinilio Music
Dimitris Liolios	"Ta monopatia" (Τα μονοπάτια)	Satellite Records
~~Duo Fina~~	~~"Idio tempo" (Ίδιο τέμπο)~~	~~Records On Top~~
Foteini Vasilaki	"Pes pos m'agapas" (Πες πως μ'αγαπάς)	Music Art Lab
Giannis Moraitis	"I poli imaste ena" (Οι πολλοί είμαστε ένα)	Vinilio Music
INK	"Thimame" (Θυμάμαι)	Heaven Music
Kyriaki Derebei feat. Lava	"Kokkina feggaria" (Κόκκινα φεγγάρια)	FinalTouch
Nikos Baibos	"Efhi kai katara" (Ευχή και κατάρα)	Satellite Records
Panagiotis Tsakalakos and Tania Breazou	"Anepanalipti" (Ανεπανάληπτη)	Feelgood Records
Stereo Soul feat. DJ Koncept	"Boro" (Μπορώ)	Heaven Music
Tania Breazou	"Kati" (Κάτι)	Feelgood Records
~~Tony Vlahos~~	~~"Baila jazz"~~	~~Spider Music~~
Vaggelis Panatos	"Mesogeios" (Μεσόγειος)	E&E Music Production
Vasiliki Stefanou	"Gia sena" (Για σενα)	Polymusic
Yianna Terzi	"Oniro mou" (Όνειρό μου)	Panik Records
Yiannis Dimitras	"Ta paidia tis Athinas" (Τα παιδιά της Αθήνας)	Mirror Music

=== Internal selection ===
On 15 February 2018, two of the three remaining selected entries "Min ksehnas ton ilio" performed by Areti Ketime and "Apo tin Thraki eos tin Kriti" performed by Chorostalites were disqualified as the artists' respective record labels did not pay the €20,000 requested by ERT to be used to finance the final itself. Ketime called out the broadcaster following the announcement, noting that her record label was unaware of the money required to participate until the last minute. With only one candidate remaining, ERT confirmed that "Oniro mou" performed by Yianna Terzi, would become the Greek entry for the 2018 contest on 16 February 2018. "Oniro mou" was written by Terzi, Aris Kalimeris, Dimitris Stamatiou and Mihalis Papathanasiou.

=== Promotion ===
To promote the entry, a music video of "Oniro mou" was presented on 8 March 2018 during the ERT1 programme Sto dromo gia ti Lisavona (Στο δρόμο για τη Λισαβόνα; "On the road to Lisbon"), hosted by Duo Fina and aired on ERT1, ERT HD, ERT World and through a live webcast. The video, produced by Panik Records in collaboration with ERT, was directed by Sherif Francis and featured a guest appearance by actor Dimitris Vlachos. Following the presentation of the video, Terzi along with the co-writers of the song spoke about their upcoming appearance at the contest. Further promotion of the entry found Terzi performing "Oniro mou" live at the MAD TV annual fashion music series MADwalk on 14 April where she was joined by fellow Eurovision 2018 entrants from Cyprus and Azerbaijan. The following week on 22 April, Terzi was a guest on the ESCToday webcast Eurovision Live Lounge where she was interviewed and sang an exclusive preview of the English version of "Oniro mou", which was titled "Eternity".

== At Eurovision ==
The Eurovision Song Contest 2018 took place at the Altice Arena in Lisbon, Portugal. It consisted of two semi-finals held on 8 and 10 May, respectively, and the final on 12 May 2018. All nations with the exceptions of the host country and the "Big Five", consisting of France, Germany, Italy, Spain and the United Kingdom, were required to qualify from one of two semi-finals to compete for the final; the top 10 countries from each semi-final progress to the final. Semi-finalists were allocated into six different pots based on voting patterns from previous contests as determined by the contest's televoting partner Digame, with the aim of reducing the chance of neighbourly voting between countries while also increasing suspense during the voting process. On 29 January 2018, an allocation draw was held at Lisbon City Hall which placed each country into one of the two semi-finals and determined which half of the show they would perform in. Greece was placed into the first semi-final, to be held on 8 May 2018, and was scheduled to perform in the second half of the show.

Once all the competing songs for the 2018 contest had been released, the running order for the semi-finals was decided by the shows' producers rather than through another draw, so that similar songs were not placed next to each other. Greece was set to perform fourteenth, following the entry from Austria and preceding the entry from Finland. The two semi-finals and the final were televised in Greece on ERT1, ERT HD and ERT World as well as broadcast via radio on ERA 2 and Voice of Greece with commentary by Alexandros Lizardos and Daphne Skalioni.

=== Semi-final ===
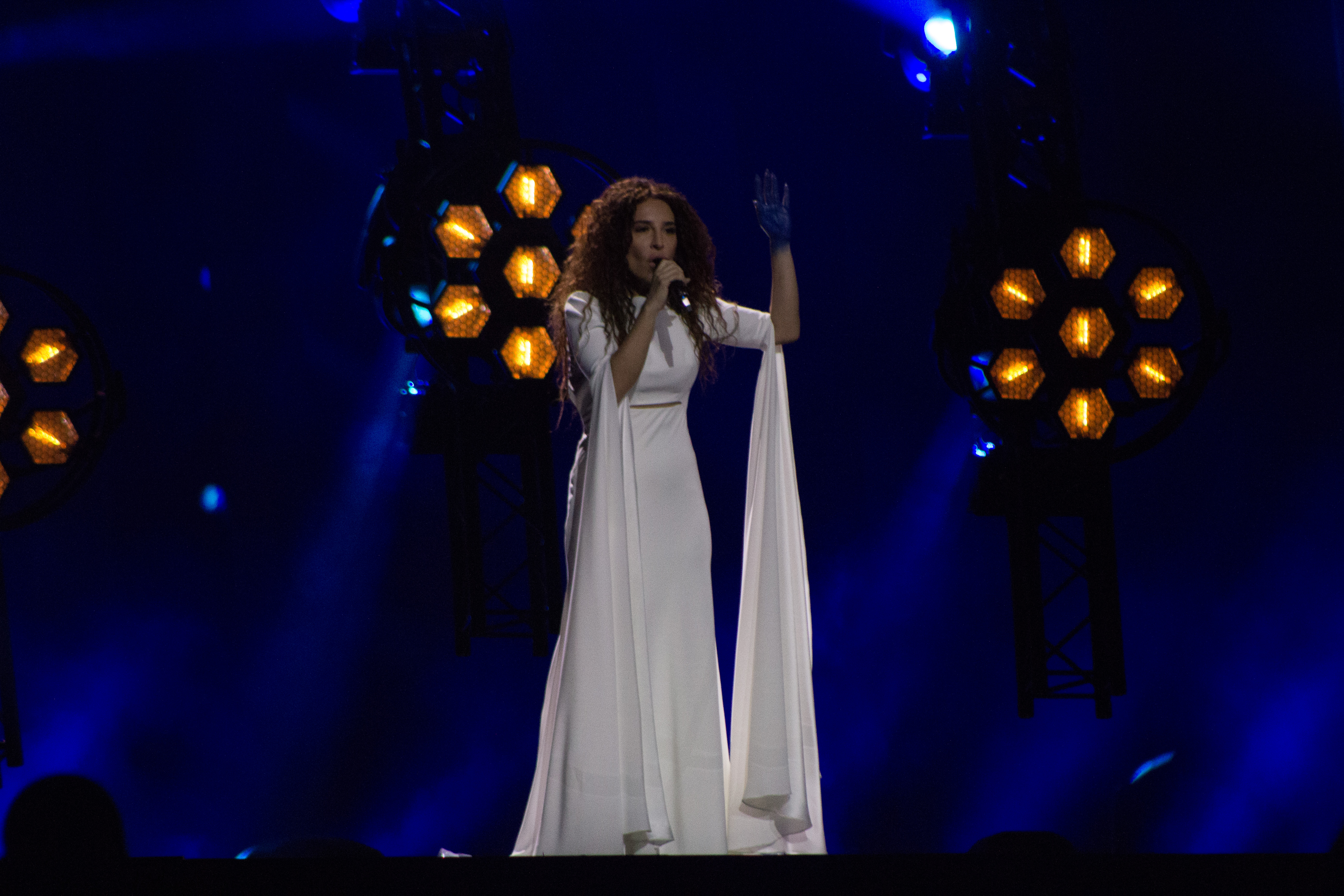
Yianna Terzi during a rehearsal before the first semi-final

Yianna Terzi took part in technical rehearsals on 30 April and 3 May, followed by dress rehearsals on 7 and 8 May. This included the jury show on 7 May where the professional juries of each country watched and voted on the competing entries.

The Greek performance was choreographed by Chali Jennings and featured Yianna Terzi dressed in a flowing white gown with wide sleeves and performing on stage with her hand painted blue. In regards to the blue hand, Terzi stated: "The song has a reference 'in the blue'; blue represents the blue sky of Greece, the ocean, what Greece is known for. And because it is a dialogue between Greece and Greeks, and devoted to the country, I wanted to symbolize the Greek blue." The stage lighting transitioned between blue, red and orange colours throughout the performance, which also featured the use of a wind machine. Terzi was joined by four off-stage backing vocalists: Evgenia Balafa, Giannis Lafis, Irini Psyhrami and Victoria Chalkitis.

At the end of the show, Greece was not announced among the top 10 entries in the first semi-final and therefore failed to qualify to compete in the final. It was later revealed that Greece placed fourteenth in the semi-final, receiving a total of 81 points: 53 points from the televoting and 28 points from the juries.

=== Voting ===
Voting during the three shows involved each country awarding two sets of points from 1–8, 10 and 12: one from their expert jury and the other from televoting. Each nation's jury consisted of five music industry professionals who are citizens of the country they represent. The jury judged each entry based on: vocal capacity; the stage performance; the song's composition and originality; and the overall impression by the act. No member of a national jury was permitted to be connected in any way to any of the competing acts in such a way that they cannot vote impartially and independently. Greece's jury consisted of Nikos Graigos, Yiannis Nikoletopoulos, Ares Anagnostopoulos, Ilenia Williams and Margo Enepekidi. The Greek spokesperson, who announced the top 12-point score awarded by the Greek jury during the final, was Olina Xenopoulou. Below is a breakdown of points awarded to Greece and awarded by Greece in the first semi-final and final of the contest, and the breakdown of the jury voting and televoting conducted during the two shows:

==== Points awarded to Greece ====
Points awarded to Greece (Semi-final 1)
Score	Televote	Jury
12 points	Cyprus	
10 points	Albania; Bulgaria	Azerbaijan
8 points	Armenia	Cyprus
7 points		
6 points		
5 points		
4 points	Macedonia	
3 points	Croatia; United Kingdom	Albania; Croatia
2 points	Switzerland	Armenia
1 point	Belgium	Iceland; Ireland

==== Points awarded by Greece ====
Points awarded by Greece (Semi-final 1)
Score	Televote	Jury
12 points	Cyprus	Azerbaijan
10 points	Albania	Estonia
8 points	Estonia	Albania
7 points	Bulgaria	Cyprus
6 points	Czech Republic	Bulgaria
5 points	Armenia	Croatia
4 points	Ireland	Israel
3 points	Azerbaijan	Macedonia
2 points	Israel	Czech Republic
1 point	Belarus	Switzerland

Points awarded by Greece (Final)
Score	Televote	Jury
12 points	Cyprus	Cyprus
10 points	Albania	Moldova
8 points	Italy	Sweden
7 points	Czech Republic	Albania
6 points	Israel	Hungary
5 points	Bulgaria	France
4 points	Estonia	Israel
3 points	Norway	Estonia
2 points	Germany	Serbia
1 point	Moldova	Italy

==== Detailed voting results ====
The following members comprised the Greek jury:

- Nikos Graigos (jury chairperson) – artist (performer), music producer
- Yiannis Nikoletopoulos – artist (percussionist), author of lyrics, composer
- Ares Anagnostopoulos – artist manager
- Ilenia Williams – music journalist, TV presenter, radio producer
- Margo Enepekidi – performer, musician, composer

Detailed voting results from Greece (Semi-final 1)
R/O	Country	Jury							Televote	
R/O	Country	N. Graigos	Y. Nikoletopoulos	A. Anagnostopoulos	I. Williams	M. Enepekidi	Rank	Points	Rank	Points
01	Azerbaijan	1	1	1	2	2	1	12	8	3
02	Iceland	18	18	18	17	17	18		18	
03	Albania	4	3	2	4	5	3	8	2	10
04	Belgium	15	13	14	16	15	16		12	
05	Czech Republic	7	10	10	6	8	9	2	5	6
06	Lithuania	16	11	4	18	18	11		13	
07	Israel	11	5	5	12	10	7	4	9	2
08	Belarus	13	14	15	7	9	13		10	1
09	Estonia	5	2	3	3	4	2	10	3	8
10	Bulgaria	2	4	9	5	3	5	6	4	7
11	Macedonia	8	7	8	9	7	8	3	17	
12	Croatia	9	8	6	8	6	6	5	16	
13	Austria	14	12	13	11	12	14		15	
14	Greece									
15	Finland	12	15	17	13	11	15		14	
16	Armenia	17	16	16	15	14	17		6	5
17	Switzerland	3	17	12	14	16	10	1	11	
18	Ireland	10	9	11	10	13	12		7	4
19	Cyprus	6	6	7	1	1	4	7	1	12

Detailed voting results from Greece (Final)
R/O	Country	Jury							Televote	
R/O	Country	N. Graigos	Y. Nikoletopoulos	A. Anagnostopoulos	I. Williams	M. Enepekidi	Rank	Points	Rank	Points
01	Ukraine	23	17	21	24	21	22		15	
02	Spain	25	25	20	19	22	24		24	
03	Slovenia	26	18	24	23	20	23		25	
04	Lithuania	17	20	16	16	15	18		18	
05	Austria	20	19	22	17	17	20		20	
06	Estonia	9	10	12	5	3	8	3	7	4
07	Norway	24	12	11	13	10	15		8	3
08	Portugal	21	22	23	22	25	25		26	
09	United Kingdom	22	24	26	21	23	26		22	
10	Serbia	6	6	7	9	7	9	2	19	
11	Germany	13	13	2	18	19	11		9	2
12	Albania	5	5	5	6	6	4	7	2	10
13	France	8	1	9	7	16	6	5	11	
14	Czech Republic	10	11	10	10	11	13		4	7
15	Denmark	14	26	25	26	26	21		14	
16	Australia	12	23	19	4	14	14		21	
17	Finland	16	21	15	15	18	19		23	
18	Bulgaria	18	14	18	12	9	16		6	5
19	Moldova	4	3	4	2	2	2	10	10	1
20	Sweden	7	8	6	3	4	3	8	17	
21	Hungary	1	9	14	8	5	5	6	13	
22	Israel	2	7	8	11	8	7	4	5	6
23	Netherlands	15	4	13	20	12	12		16	
24	Ireland	11	15	17	14	13	17		12	
25	Cyprus	3	2	3	1	1	1	12	1	12
26	Italy	19	16	1	25	24	10	1	3	8
