= Belarus in the Eurovision Song Contest 2018 =

- Eurovision Song Contest 2018
- Participating broadcaster: Belarusian Television and Radio Company (BTRC)
- Country: Belarus
- Selection process: Национальный отбор
- Selection date: 16 February 2018

Competing entry
- Song: "Forever"
- Artist: Alekseev
- Songwriters: Kirill Pavlov; Yevgeny Matyushenko

Placement
- Semi-final result: Failed to qualify (16th)

Participation chronology

Belarus was represented at the Eurovision Song Contest 2018 with the song "Forever", written by Kirill Pavlov and Yevgeny Matyushenko, and performed by Alekseev. The Belarusian participating broadcaster, Belarusian Television and Radio Company (BTRC), selected its entry for the contest through Национальный отбор. The national final consisted of fifteen competing acts participating in a televised production where "Forever" performed by Alekseev was selected as the winner following the combination of votes from a jury panel and public televoting.

Belarus was drawn to compete in the first semi-final of the Eurovision Song Contest which took place on 8 May 2018. Performing during the show in position 8, "Forever" was not announced among the top 10 entries of the first semi-final and therefore did not qualify to compete in the final. It was later revealed that Belarus placed sixteenth out of the 19 participating countries in the semi-final with 65 points.

== Background ==
Prior to the 2018 contest, Belarusian Television and Radio Company (BTRC) had participated in the Eurovision Song Contest representing Belarus fourteen times since its first entry in 2004. Its best placing in the contest was sixth, achieved in 2007 with the song "Work Your Magic" performed by Dmitry Koldun. Following the introduction of semi-finals for the 2004 contest, Belarus had managed to qualify to the final four times. In 2017, "Story of My Life" performed by Naviband qualified to the final and placed seventeenth.

As part of its duties as participating broadcaster, BTRC organises the selection of its entry in the Eurovision Song Contest and broadcasts the event in the country. The broadcaster has used both internal selections and national finals to select its entry for Eurovision in the past. Since 2012, BTRC has organised a national final in order to choose its entry, a selection procedure that will continue for 2018.

== Before Eurovision ==
=== National final ===
The Belarusian national final took place on 16 February 2018. Ten songs participated in the competition and the winner was selected through a jury and public televote. The show was broadcast on Belarus 1, Belarus 24 and Radius FM as well as online via the broadcaster's official website tvr.by.

==== Competing entries ====
Artists and composers were able to submit their applications and entries to the broadcaster between 1 December 2017 and 26 December 2017. At the closing of the deadline, 95 entries were received by the broadcaster. Auditions were held on 11 January 2018 at the BTRC "600 Metrov" studio where a jury panel was tasked with selecting up to fifteen entries to proceed to the televised national final. The auditions were webcast online at the official BTRC website. The jury consisted of Valery Dayneko (chairman of the jury, singer), Olga Salamakha (deputy director of the TV channel Belarus 1), Andrey Kalina (director of the Music Production Center), Victoria Aleshko (singer), Olga Vronskaya (artist of the Youth Theatre), Ekaterina Dulova (rector of BGAE), Tatyana Parhamovich (deputy head of the department of professional art of the Ministry of Culture of Belarus), Elena Treschinskaya (head of the radio station "Radius FM"), Denis Dudinsky (television host and singer), Grigor Abalyan (owner of the First Concert company), Natalia Tambovtseva (composer), Sergey Malinovsky (journalist) and Alexander Chernukho (journalist). Eleven finalists were selected and announced on 11 January 2018.

Following the announcement of the finalists, it emerged that "Forever" had been performed by Alekseev in Russian at several concerts before 1 September 2017; Alekseev was ultimately allowed to participate after changes to the song's melody were made. On 16 January 2018, "Gravity", written by Leo Vasilets and to have been performed by Sofi Lapina, was withdrawn from the competition. On 17 January 2018, it emerged that the participation of Shuma was being investigated as "Hmarki" contained lyrics from a traditional Belarusian folk song; the band was ultimately allowed to participate after adjusting the song lyrics.

Artist	Song	Songwriter(s)
Adagio	"Ty i ja" (Ты і я)	Evgeniy Oleynik, Yulia Bykova
Alekseev	"Forever"	Kirill Pavlov, Yevgeny Matyushenko
Alen Hit	"I Don't Care"	Oleg Shutskiy
Anastasiya Malashkevich	"World on Fire"	Ylva Persson, Linda Persson, Niklas Bergqvist, Simon Johansson
Gunesh	"I Won't Cry"	Tim Norell, Ola Håkansson, Alexander Bard
Kirill Good	"Deja Vu"	Kirill Ermakov, Roman Kolodko
Lexy Weaver	"Ain't You"	Aleksandra Tkach
Napoli	"Chasing Rushes"	Will Taylor, Michael James Down
Radiovolna	"Subway Lines"	Vlad Chizhikov, German Bronovitski, Vitaly Vechersky, Roman Kolodko
Shuma	"Hmarki" (Хмаркі)	Maks Shur, Alyaxey Korobeynik

==== Final ====
The televised final took place on 16 February 2018 at the "600 Metrov" studio in Minsk, hosted by Olga Ryzhikova and 2014 Belarusian Eurovision contestant Teo. Prior to the competition, a draw for the running order took place on 16 January 2018. A 50/50 combination of votes from nine jury members made up of music professionals and public televoting selected the song "Forever" performed by Alekseev as the winner. The jury consisted of Elena Treschinskaya (head of the radio station "Radius FM"), Alexander Kapenkin (director of the TV channel TV BelMuz), Olga Salamakha (deputy director of the TV channel Belarus 1), Tatyana Parkhimovich (deputy head of the Belarusian Ministry of Culture), Aleks David (singer-songwriter), Andrey Kalina (producer), Sergey Malinovsky (journalist), Igor Melnikov (vocal coach) and Alexander Chernukho (journalist).

In addition to the performances from the competitors, the show featured guest performances by 2017 Belarusian Eurovision contestant Naviband, Violetta Baginskaya, Angelina Pipper, Ivan Zdonyuk, Angelica Pushnova, Elizaveta Muravera, July, Michael Soul and Beatrees.

Final – 16 February 2018
R/O	Artist	Song	Jury	Televote		Total	Place
R/O	Artist	Song	Jury	Votes	Points	Total	Place
1	Adagio	"Ty i ja"	1	581	1	2	10
2	Alekseev	"Forever"	12	5,184	12	24	1
3	Shuma	"Hmarki"	4	3,042	10	14	3
4	Napoli	"Chasing Rushes"	6	1,236	7	13	4
5	Anastasiya Malashkevich	"World on Fire"	7	804	5	12	7
6	Gunesh	"I Won't Cry"	8	1,041	6	14	2
7	Radiovolna	"Subway Lines"	10	599	2	12	6
8	Alen Hit	"I Don't Care"	2	718	4	6	9
9	Lexy Weaver	"Ain't You"	4	669	3	7	8
10	Kirill Good	"Deja Vu"	5	1,359	8	13	5

==== Controversy ====
Prior to the national final, seven of the competing artists stated in an open letter to BTRC that they would withdraw from the competition if Alekseev was not disqualified, also adding that they believe the show was being rigged for him to win. All artists except Sofi Lapina, who withdrew in protest of BTRC blocking several of her participating songs that have been released or performed before that date yet neglected to disqualify Alekseev for the same reason, ultimately remained as participants and performed at the national final. Following the show, the songwriters of "I Won't Cry", performed by Gunesh, announced that they would take legal action against BTRC and the European Broadcasting Union (EBU), the latter which approved "Forever" to still compete in the contest despite previous claims.

=== Promotion ===
Alekseev made several appearances across Europe to specifically promote "Forever" as the Belarusian Eurovision entry. Between 8 and 11 April, Alekseev took part in promotional activities in Tel Aviv, Israel and performed during the Israel Calling event held at the Rabin Square. On 14 April, Alekseev performed during the Eurovision in Concert event which was held at the AFAS Live venue in Amsterdam, Netherlands and hosted by Edsilia Rombley and Cornald Maas. On 21 April, Alekseev performed during the ESPreParty event which was held at the Sala La Riviera venue in Madrid, Spain and hosted by Soraya Arnelas.

== At Eurovision ==
According to Eurovision rules, all nations with the exceptions of the host country and the "Big Five" (France, Germany, Italy, Spain and the United Kingdom) are required to qualify from one of two semi-finals in order to compete for the final; the top ten countries from each semi-final progress to the final. The European Broadcasting Union (EBU) split up the competing countries into six different pots based on voting patterns from previous contests, with countries with favourable voting histories put into the same pot. On 29 January 2018, a special allocation draw was held which placed each country into one of the two semi-finals, as well as which half of the show they would perform in. Belarus was placed into the first semi-final, to be held on 8 May 2018, and was scheduled to perform in the first half of the show.

Once all the competing songs for the 2018 contest had been released, the running order for the semi-finals was decided by the shows' producers rather than through another draw, so that similar songs were not placed next to each other. Belarus was set to perform in position 8, following the entry from Israel and before the entry from Estonia.

The two semi-finals and the final were broadcast in Belarus on Belarus 1 and Belarus 24 with commentary by Evgeny Perlin. The Belarusian spokesperson, who announce the top 12-point score awarded by the Belarusian jury during the final, was 2017 Belarusian representative Naviband.

=== Semi-final ===
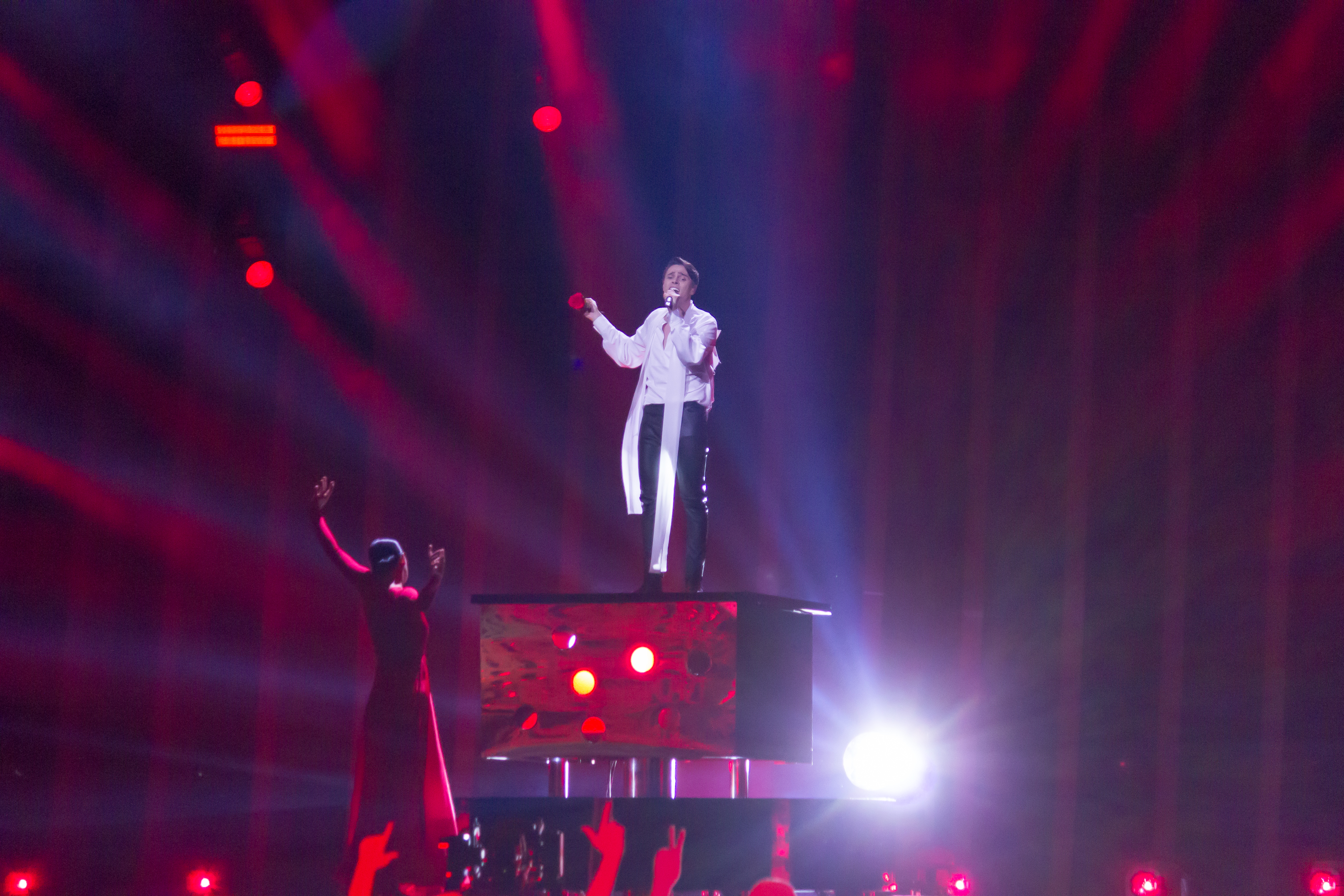
Alekseev during a rehearsal before the first semi-final

Alekseev took part in technical rehearsals on 29 April and 3 May, followed by dress rehearsals on 7 and 8 May. This included the jury show on 7 May where the professional juries of each country watched and voted on the competing entries.

The Belarusian performance featured Alekseev wearing a white shirt and black trousers, performing on stage together with a ballet dancer who wore a full length red Flamenco inspired dress. The performance began with Alekseev on a platform while singing to a red rose which he then presented to the camera. The rose was then handed to the dancer who fired it back through Alekseev's hand with a bow. The platform was later raised up from the stage, and was concluded with Alekseev turning his back showing a rose injury. The dancer that joined Alekseev was Yulia Zima-Blazhkiv, while the singer was also joined by four off-stage backing vocalists: Anna Kilchenko, Anyanya Udongwo, Valeriya Khomenko and Vilen Kilchenko.

At the end of the show, Belarus was not announced among the top 10 entries in the first semi-final and therefore failed to qualify to compete in the final. It was later revealed that Belarus placed sixteenth in the semi-final, receiving a total of 65 points: 45 points from the televoting and 20 points from the juries.

=== Voting ===
Voting during the three shows involved each country awarding two sets of points from 1-8, 10 and 12: one from their professional jury and the other from televoting. Each nation's jury consisted of five music industry professionals who are citizens of the country they represent, with their names published before the contest to ensure transparency. This jury judged each entry based on: vocal capacity; the stage performance; the song's composition and originality; and the overall impression by the act. In addition, no member of a national jury was permitted to be related in any way to any of the competing acts in such a way that they cannot vote impartially and independently. The individual rankings of each jury member as well as the nation's televoting results were released shortly after the grand final.

Below is a breakdown of points awarded to Belarus and awarded by Belarus in the first semi-final and grand final of the contest, and the breakdown of the jury voting and televoting conducted during the two shows:

==== Points awarded to Belarus ====
Points awarded to Belarus (Semi-final 1)
Score	Televote	Jury
12 points	Azerbaijan	Azerbaijan
10 points	Armenia	
8 points		
7 points		Albania
6 points	Estonia; Lithuania	
5 points	Cyprus	
4 points		
3 points	Finland	
2 points	Bulgaria	
1 point	Greece	Armenia

==== Points awarded by Belarus ====
Points awarded by Belarus (Semi-final 1)
Score	Televote	Jury
12 points	Armenia	Albania
10 points	Israel	Czech Republic
8 points	Czech Republic	Croatia
7 points	Cyprus	Iceland
6 points	Lithuania	Israel
5 points	Bulgaria	Bulgaria
4 points	Austria	Armenia
3 points	Estonia	Finland
2 points	Belgium	Ireland
1 point	Ireland	Austria

Points awarded by Belarus (Final)
Score	Televote	Jury
12 points	Ukraine	Cyprus
10 points	Norway	Austria
8 points	Israel	Norway
7 points	Denmark	Albania
6 points	Moldova	Czech Republic
5 points	Czech Republic	Lithuania
4 points	Italy	Slovenia
3 points	Cyprus	Denmark
2 points	Hungary	Australia
1 point	Bulgaria	Sweden

==== Detailed voting results ====
The following members comprised the Belarusian jury:

- Iskui Abalyan (jury chairperson) – singer
- Alex Nabeev – singer
- Vladimir Bogdan – TV and radio host
- Tatsiana Parhamovich – deputy head of the Professional Arts Department of the Ministry of Culture
- Svetlana Statsenko – producer

Detailed voting results from Belarus (Semi-final 1)
R/O	Country	Jury							Televote	
R/O	Country	I. Abalyan	A. Nabeev	V. Bogdan	T. Parhamovich	S. Statsenko	Rank	Points	Rank	Points
01	Azerbaijan	18	16	8	6	15	13		11	
02	Iceland	5	5	5	2	4	4	7	17	
03	Albania	2	4	1	1	1	1	12	16	
04	Belgium	17	15	17	16	8	17		9	2
05	Czech Republic	6	1	2	3	3	2	10	3	8
06	Lithuania	7	14	16	15	6	11		5	6
07	Israel	8	2	4	14	7	5	6	2	10
08	Belarus									
09	Estonia	10	13	6	13	13	12		8	3
10	Bulgaria	9	3	7	4	11	6	5	6	5
11	Macedonia	16	18	18	18	18	18		18	
12	Croatia	1	7	3	5	2	3	8	15	
13	Austria	11	8	15	9	9	10	1	7	4
14	Greece	12	17	9	10	17	14		14	
15	Finland	4	12	14	7	16	8	3	13	
16	Armenia	3	9	13	8	5	7	4	1	12
17	Switzerland	13	10	12	17	14	16		12	
18	Ireland	14	6	10	11	10	9	2	10	1
19	Cyprus	15	11	11	12	12	15		4	7

Detailed voting results from Belarus (Final)
R/O	Country	Jury							Televote	
R/O	Country	I. Abalyan	A. Nabeev	V. Bogdan	T. Parhamovich	S. Statsenko	Rank	Points	Rank	Points
01	Ukraine	14	18	8	19	15	15		1	12
02	Spain	15	24	18	13	18	21		26	
03	Slovenia	8	19	3	7	12	7	4	18	
04	Lithuania	7	5	17	6	8	6	5	11	
05	Austria	3	1	2	5	5	2	10	12	
06	Estonia	16	17	9	8	11	14		16	
07	Norway	2	6	4	4	3	3	8	2	10
08	Portugal	24	25	24	16	24	24		25	
09	United Kingdom	11	21	20	12	14	16		22	
10	Serbia	22	23	16	17	22	23		20	
11	Germany	17	15	15	18	17	18		14	
12	Albania	4	7	5	2	2	4	7	24	
13	France	18	4	21	10	10	11		15	
14	Czech Republic	13	2	7	9	16	5	6	6	5
15	Denmark	12	14	6	3	13	8	3	4	7
16	Australia	6	8	22	24	4	9	2	21	
17	Finland	25	22	26	23	26	25		23	
18	Bulgaria	20	13	13	25	21	20		10	1
19	Moldova	21	20	14	22	20	22		5	6
20	Sweden	9	9	12	11	7	10	1	13	
21	Hungary	26	26	23	26	25	26		9	2
22	Israel	23	16	10	14	23	17		3	8
23	Netherlands	10	11	11	21	6	13		19	
24	Ireland	5	10	19	20	9	12		17	
25	Cyprus	1	3	1	1	1	1	12	8	3
26	Italy	19	12	25	15	19	19		7	4
