= Albania in the Eurovision Song Contest 2018 =

- Eurovision Song Contest 2018
- Participating broadcaster: Radio Televizioni Shqiptar (RTSH)
- Country: Albania
- Selection process: Festivali i Këngës 56
- Selection date: 23 December 2017

Competing entry
- Song: "Mall"
- Artist: Eugent Bushpepa
- Songwriters: Eugent Bushpepa

Placement
- Semi-final result: Qualified (8th, 162 points)
- Final result: 11th, 184 points

Participation chronology

Albania was represented at the Eurovision Song Contest 2018 in Lisbon, Portugal, with the song "Mall" performed by Eugent Bushpepa. Its selected entry was chosen through the national selection competition Festivali i Këngës organised by Radio Televizioni Shqiptar (RTSH) in December 2017. To this point, the nation had participated in the Eurovision Song Contest fourteen times since its first entry in 2004. Prior to the contest, the song was promoted by a music video and live performances in the Netherlands and Spain.

Albania was drawn to compete in the first semi-final of the Eurovision Song Contest, which took place on 8 May 2018. Performing as number three, the nation was announced among the top 10 entries of the first semi-final and therefore qualified to compete in the final. In the grand final on 12 May, it performed as number 12 and placed 11th out of the 26 participating countries, scoring 184 points, which was, at the time, the highest amount of points the country has received ever since its debut.

== Background ==
Prior to the 2018 contest, Albania had participated in the Eurovision Song Contest fourteen times since its first entry in 2004. The nation's highest placing in the contest, to this point, had been the fifth place, which it achieved in 2012 with the song "Suus" performed by Rona Nishliu. The first entry was performed by Anjeza Shahini with the song "The Image of You" and finished in the seventh place, Albania's second-highest placing to date. During its tenure in the contest, Albania failed to qualify for the final seven times, with both the 2016 and 2017 entries being the most recent non-qualifiers.

In October 2017, the national broadcaster of Albania, Radio Televizioni Shqiptar (RTSH), officially confirmed Albania's participation in the Eurovision Song Contest 2018 in Lisbon, Portugal. RTSH broadcasts the contest within Albania and organises the selection process for the nation's entry. Since its debut in 2004, it has consistently selected its entry through the long-standing competition Festivali i Këngës.

== Before Eurovision ==
=== Festivali i Këngës ===
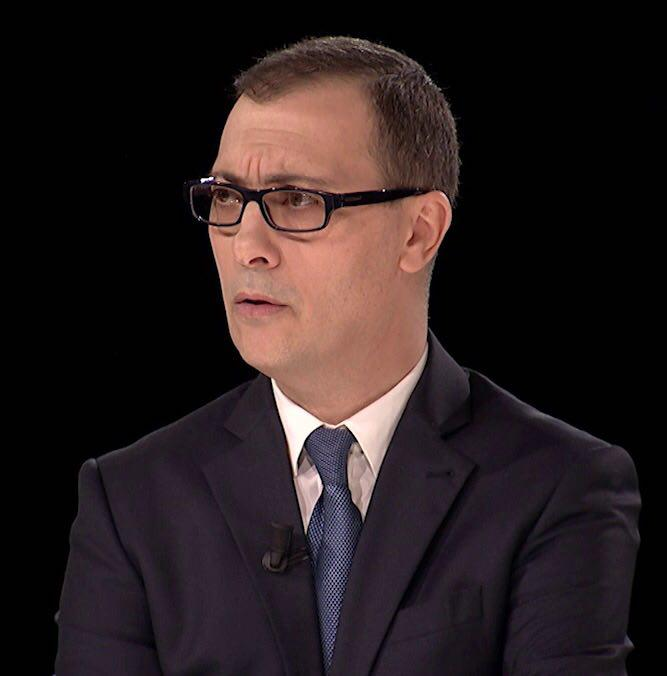
Adi Krasta hosted the 56th edition of Festivali i Këngës.

Radio Televizioni Shqiptar (RTSH) organised the 56th edition of Festivali i Këngës in order to select the nation's representative for the Eurovision Song Contest 2018. The event consisted of two semi-finals on 21 and 22 December, and the grand final on 23 December 2017. The three live shows were hosted by television presenter and journalist Adi Krasta, who had previously hosted the event five times prior to 2018. In October 2017, RTSH confirmed that the nation would participate in the contest and that once again, Festivali i Këngës would be used as the selection process for the entry. Over 70 acts submitted applications to the broadcaster for consideration during the submission period held from 2 November to 10 November 2017. The names of the 22 songs and singers selected to compete in the two semi-finals were released on 13 November.

==== Shows ====
===== Semi-finals =====
The semi-finals took place on 21 and 22 December 2017 and were broadcast at 20:45 (CET), respectively. The allocation draw of the participating entries for each semi-final was published on 19 December, a few days before the event. The interval acts for the first semi-final included performances from Italian singer-songwriter Riccardo Cocciante and Albanian singer Elhaida Dani, the latter of whom represented Albania in the Eurovision Song Contest 2015. The results of the semi-finals are outlined in the tables below, however of the 22 entries, 14 progressed to the grand final.

Semi-final 1 – 21 December 2017
| R/O | Artist | Song |
|---|---|---|
| 1 | Elton Deda | "Fjalët" |
| 2 | Mariza Ikonomi | "Unë" |
| 3 | Endri & Stefi | "Mesazh" |
| 4 | Evans Rama | "Gjurmët" |
| 5 | Genc and David Tukiçi | "Të pandarë" |
| 6 | Voltan Prodani | "E pamundur" |
| 7 | Eugent Bushpepa | "Mall" |
| 8 | Rezarta Smaja and Luiz Ejlli | "Ra një yll" |
| 9 | Bojken Lako | "Sytë e shpirtit" |
| 10 | Manjola Nallbani | "I njëjti qiell" |
| 11 | Redon Makashi | "Ekziston" |

Semi-final 2 – 22 December 2017
| R/O | Artist | Song |
|---|---|---|
| 1 | Orgesa Zaimi | "Ngrije zërin" |
| 2 | Denisa Gjezo | "Zemër ku je" |
| 3 | NA and Festina Mejzini | "Tjetër jetë" |
| 4 | Lorela Sejdini | "Pritëm edhe pak" |
| 5 | Artemisa Mithi | "E dua botën" |
| 6 | Ergi Bregu | "Bum bum" |
| 7 | Akullthyesit | "Divorc" |
| 8 | Xhesika Polo | "Përjetë" |
| 9 | Inis Neziri | "Piedestal" |
| 10 | Tiri Gjoci | "Orë e ndalur" |
| 11 | Lynx | "Vonë" |

===== Final =====
The grand final took place on 23 December 2017 and was broadcast at 20:45 (CET). It consisted of the fourteen entries that had qualified for the final, including eight from the first semi-final and six from the second semi-final. The results were determined by a jury panel consisting of Adrian Hila, Ilirian Zhupa, Limoz Dizdari, Markelian Kapedani and Zana Çela. After gathering the maximum points from the jury, "Mall" by Eugent Bushpepa emerged as the country's representative for the Eurovision Song Contest. The results of the final are summarized in the table below:

Key: Winner Second place Third place

Final – 23 December 2017
| R/O | Artist | Song | Place |
|---|---|---|---|
| 1 | Redon Makashi | "Ekziston" | 2 |
| 2 | NA and Festina Mejzini | "Tjetër jetë" | —N/a |
| 3 | Voltan Prodani | "E pamundur" | —N/a |
| 4 | Denisa Gjezo | "Zemër ku je" | —N/a |
| 5 | Tiri Gjoci | "Orë e ndalur" | —N/a |
| 6 | Orgesa Zaimi | "Ngrije zërin" | —N/a |
| 7 | Rezarta Smaja and Luiz Ejlli | "Ra një yll" | —N/a |
| 8 | Artemisa Mithi | "E dua botën" | —N/a |
| 9 | Manjola Nallbani | "I njëjti qiell" | —N/a |
| 10 | Inis Neziri | "Piedestal" | 3 |
| 11 | Bojken Lako | "Sytë e shpirtit" | —N/a |
| 12 | Mariza Ikonomi | "Unë" | —N/a |
| 13 | Eugent Bushpepa | "Mall" | 1 |
| 14 | Elton Deda | "Fjalët" | —N/a |

=== Promotion ===
An accompanying music video for "Mall" premiered on the official YouTube channel of the Eurovision Song Contest on 26 March 2018. Apart from the music video, Eugent Bushpepa traveled to the city of Aveiro on the Atlantic Ocean to film his introductory postcard, serving as an introduction for each participating country and artist. The postcard shows him visiting the fishermen's houses, fish warehouses and the salt mines of Aveiro. For further promotional purposes, the singer embarked on a small tour with live performances at various Eurovision Song Contest-related events, including Amsterdam and Madrid. In addition, he was scheduled to perform in London but was forced to withdraw due to issues obtaining a visa.

== At Eurovision ==
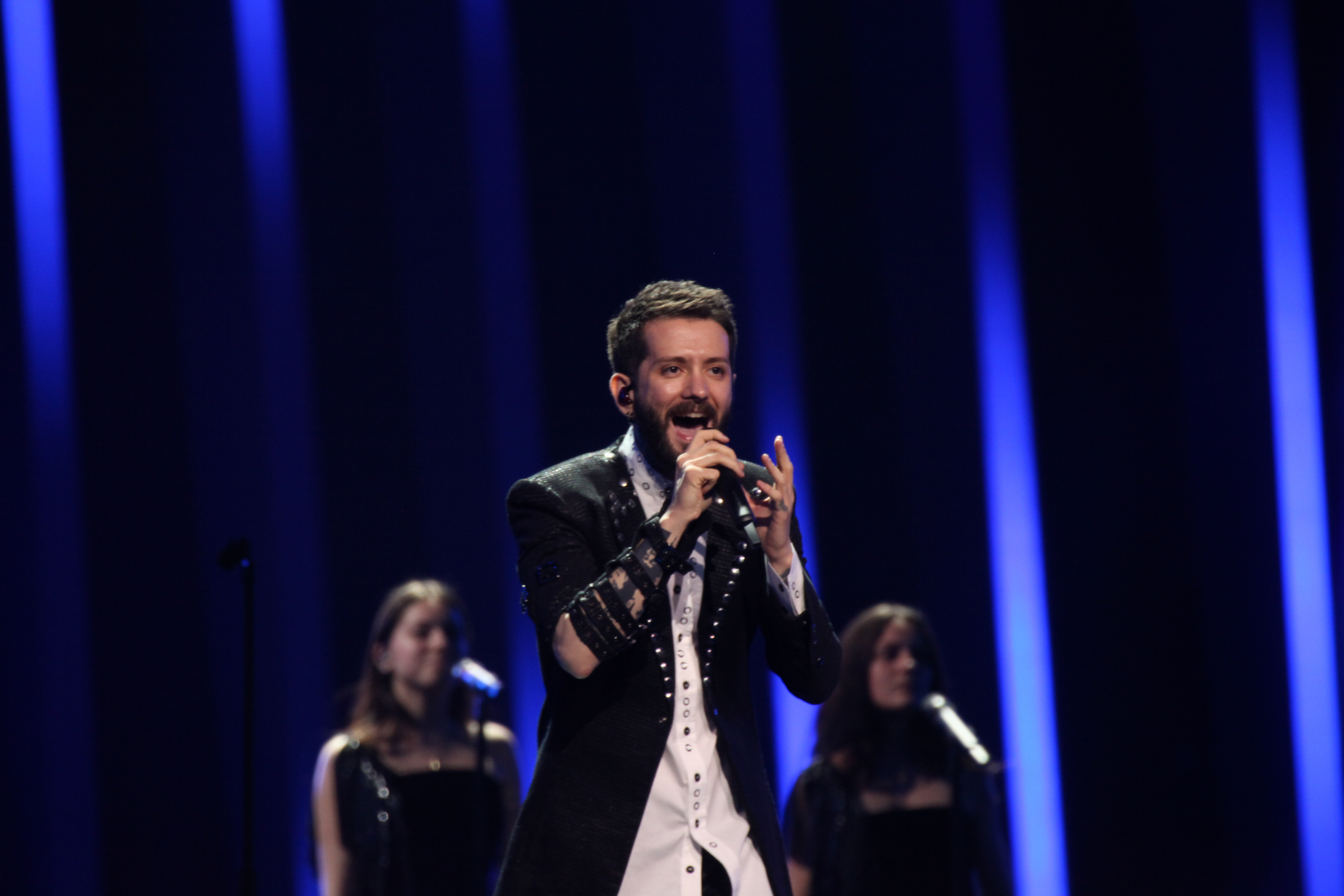
Eugent Bushpepa during a rehearsal for the grand final of the Eurovision Song Contest 2018.

The Eurovision Song Contest 2018 took place at the Altice Arena in Lisbon, Portugal, and consisted of two semi-finals held on the respective dates of 8 and 10 May and the grand final on 12 May 2018. According to the rules, each participating country, except the host country and the "Big Five", consisting of France, Germany, Italy, Spain, and the United Kingdom, were required to qualify from one of the two semi-finals to compete for the grand final, although, the top ten countries from the respective semi-final progress to the grand final.

In January 2018, a special allocation draw was held at the City Hall of Lisbon that placed each country into one of the two semi-finals, as well as which half of the show they would perform in. Albania was placed into the first semi-final, to be held on 8 May, and was scheduled to perform in the first half of the show. Once all the competing songs for the 2018 contest had been released, the running order for the semi-finals was decided by the producers of the contest rather than through another draw, for preventing similar songs being placed next to each other. Albania was set to perform in position three, following Iceland and preceding Belgium. At the end of the semi-final, the nation was announced among the top 10 entries and therefore qualified to compete in the grand final. Four days later at the grand final on 12 May, Albania appeared twelfth in the running order, following Germany and preceding France.

=== Voting ===
Voting during the three shows involved each country awarding two sets of points, including one from their professional jury and the other from televoting. Songs were given points ranging from 1 though 8, then 10 and 12, from lowest to highest ranking. Each nation's jury consisted of five music professionals, who are citizens of the country they represent, with their names published before the contest to ensure transparency. This jury judged each entry based on vocal capacity, the stage performance, the song's composition and originality, and the act's overall impression. In addition, no member of a national jury was permitted to be related in any way to any of the competing acts in such a way that they cannot vote impartially and independently. The individual rankings of each jury member as well as the nation's televoting results were released shortly after the grand final.

The tables below visualise a breakdown of points awarded to Albania in the first semi-final and final of the Eurovision Song Contest 2018, as well as by the nation on both occasions. In the semi-final, Albania finished in eighth place, being awarded a total of 162 points, including 12 by the televoters from Macedonia, and the same number of points by the juries from Belarus and Iceland. In the final, Albania reached the 11th place with 184 points, including 12 by the televoters from Italy and Macedonia, and 12 by the juries from Azerbaijan.

==== Points awarded to Albania ====
Points awarded to Albania (Semi-final 1)
| Score | Televote | Jury |
|---|---|---|
| 12 points | Macedonia | Belarus; Iceland |
| 10 points | Greece; Switzerland | Macedonia |
| 8 points | | Greece |
| 7 points | | Azerbaijan; Cyprus; United Kingdom |
| 6 points | | Austria; Bulgaria; Finland |
| 5 points | Spain | Armenia; Czech Republic; Portugal |
| 4 points | Croatia | Belgium; Croatia; Israel; Spain |
| 3 points | Czech Republic | |
| 2 points | | |
| 1 point | Austria; Finland; Ireland; United Kingdom | Estonia; Lithuania |

Points awarded to Albania (Final)
| Score | Televote | Jury |
|---|---|---|
| 12 points | Italy; Macedonia | Azerbaijan |
| 10 points | Greece; Montenegro | Hungary; Iceland; Montenegro; Portugal |
| 8 points | | |
| 7 points | Switzerland | Austria; Belarus; Bulgaria; Greece; Poland; United Kingdom |
| 6 points | | Cyprus; Czech Republic; Macedonia |
| 5 points | | |
| 4 points | Croatia | Georgia; Slovenia |
| 3 points | | |
| 2 points | Austria | Belgium; Ireland |
| 1 point | Slovenia | Croatia; Serbia |

==== Points awarded by Albania ====
Points awarded by Albania (Semi-final 1)
| Score | Televote | Jury |
|---|---|---|
| 12 points | Cyprus | Cyprus |
| 10 points | Greece | Israel |
| 8 points | Finland | Macedonia |
| 7 points | Azerbaijan | Belarus |
| 6 points | Estonia | Bulgaria |
| 5 points | Bulgaria | Azerbaijan |
| 4 points | Israel | Belgium |
| 3 points | Austria | Greece |
| 2 points | Czech Republic | Switzerland |
| 1 point | Switzerland | Lithuania |

Points awarded by Albania (Final)
| Score | Televote | Jury |
|---|---|---|
| 12 points | Italy | Italy |
| 10 points | Cyprus | Cyprus |
| 8 points | Germany | Bulgaria |
| 7 points | Ireland | France |
| 6 points | Bulgaria | Germany |
| 5 points | France | Israel |
| 4 points | Estonia | Sweden |
| 3 points | United Kingdom | Serbia |
| 2 points | Austria | Moldova |
| 1 point | Israel | Czech Republic |

==== Detailed voting results ====
The following members comprised the Albanian jury:

- Elton Deda (jury chairperson) – singer, music producer, pianist
- Baftar Luzati (Ben Andoni) – journalist
- Bojken Lako – singer, TV and theater director
- Rosela Gjylbegu – singer
- Kamela Islamaj – singer

Detailed voting results from Albania (Semi-final 1)
| R/O | Country | Jury | | | | | | | Televote | |
| R/O | Country | E. Deda | B. Andoni | B. Lako | R. Gjylbegu | K. Islamaj | Rank | Points | Rank | Points |
|---|---|---|---|---|---|---|---|---|---|---|
| 01 | Azerbaijan | 3 | 3 | 17 | 4 | 17 | 6 | 5 | 4 | 7 |
| 02 | Iceland | 17 | 10 | 16 | 17 | 16 | 17 | | 18 | |
| 03 | Albania | | | | | | | | | |
| 04 | Belgium | 7 | 11 | 1 | 8 | 8 | 7 | 4 | 15 | |
| 05 | Czech Republic | 18 | 15 | 15 | 18 | 15 | 18 | | 9 | 2 |
| 06 | Lithuania | 13 | 13 | 2 | 9 | 9 | 10 | 1 | 11 | |
| 07 | Israel | 5 | 6 | 3 | 6 | 3 | 2 | 10 | 7 | 4 |
| 08 | Belarus | 6 | 9 | 4 | 1 | 10 | 4 | 7 | 13 | |
| 09 | Estonia | 15 | 5 | 18 | 14 | 18 | 14 | | 5 | 6 |
| 10 | Bulgaria | 8 | 7 | 5 | 7 | 2 | 5 | 6 | 6 | 5 |
| 11 | Macedonia | 2 | 2 | 10 | 3 | 14 | 3 | 8 | 16 | |
| 12 | Croatia | 14 | 8 | 9 | 10 | 13 | 13 | | 17 | |
| 13 | Austria | 11 | 16 | 12 | 16 | 5 | 12 | | 8 | 3 |
| 14 | Greece | 4 | 4 | 11 | 5 | 12 | 8 | 3 | 2 | 10 |
| 15 | Finland | 12 | 14 | 13 | 12 | 11 | 16 | | 3 | 8 |
| 16 | Armenia | 10 | 17 | 6 | 11 | 7 | 11 | | 12 | |
| 17 | Switzerland | 9 | 12 | 7 | 13 | 1 | 9 | 2 | 10 | 1 |
| 18 | Ireland | 16 | 18 | 14 | 15 | 6 | 15 | | 14 | |
| 19 | Cyprus | 1 | 1 | 8 | 2 | 4 | 1 | 12 | 1 | 12 |

Detailed voting results from Albania (Final)
| R/O | Country | Jury | | | | | | | Televote | |
| R/O | Country | E. Deda | B. Andoni | B. Lako | R. Gjylbegu | K. Islamaj | Rank | Points | Rank | Points |
|---|---|---|---|---|---|---|---|---|---|---|
| 01 | Ukraine | 20 | 16 | 24 | 16 | 23 | 23 | | 18 | |
| 02 | Spain | 13 | 13 | 23 | 15 | 18 | 14 | | 25 | |
| 03 | Slovenia | 21 | 17 | 17 | 14 | 16 | 18 | | 19 | |
| 04 | Lithuania | 18 | 20 | 14 | 13 | 17 | 16 | | 15 | |
| 05 | Austria | 15 | 15 | 11 | 17 | 12 | 11 | | 9 | 2 |
| 06 | Estonia | 17 | 21 | 12 | 12 | 24 | 13 | | 7 | 4 |
| 07 | Norway | 23 | 19 | 22 | 18 | 22 | 25 | | 13 | |
| 08 | Portugal | 16 | 22 | 13 | 19 | 14 | 17 | | 24 | |
| 09 | United Kingdom | 11 | 14 | 21 | 20 | 19 | 15 | | 8 | 3 |
| 10 | Serbia | 8 | 6 | 10 | 9 | 9 | 8 | 3 | 16 | |
| 11 | Germany | 4 | 5 | 3 | 4 | 6 | 5 | 6 | 3 | 8 |
| 12 | Albania | | | | | | | | | |
| 13 | France | 3 | 3 | 6 | 5 | 5 | 4 | 7 | 6 | 5 |
| 14 | Czech Republic | 9 | 10 | 9 | 10 | 8 | 10 | 1 | 17 | |
| 15 | Denmark | 19 | 12 | 20 | 21 | 21 | 21 | | 20 | |
| 16 | Australia | 14 | 23 | 19 | 22 | 25 | 24 | | 14 | |
| 17 | Finland | 12 | 25 | 15 | 23 | 20 | 20 | | 11 | |
| 18 | Bulgaria | 5 | 4 | 5 | 3 | 4 | 3 | 8 | 5 | 6 |
| 19 | Moldova | 10 | 7 | 8 | 7 | 10 | 9 | 2 | 22 | |
| 20 | Sweden | 7 | 9 | 7 | 8 | 7 | 7 | 4 | 21 | |
| 21 | Hungary | 22 | 24 | 16 | 24 | 11 | 19 | | 23 | |
| 22 | Israel | 6 | 8 | 4 | 6 | 3 | 6 | 5 | 10 | 1 |
| 23 | Netherlands | 24 | 18 | 25 | 25 | 13 | 22 | | 12 | |
| 24 | Ireland | 25 | 11 | 18 | 11 | 15 | 12 | | 4 | 7 |
| 25 | Cyprus | 1 | 2 | 2 | 2 | 2 | 2 | 10 | 2 | 10 |
| 26 | Italy | 2 | 1 | 1 | 1 | 1 | 1 | 12 | 1 | 12 |
