= Bulgaria in the Eurovision Song Contest 2018 =

- Eurovision Song Contest 2018
- Participating broadcaster: Bulgarian National Television (BNT)
- Country: Bulgaria
- Selection process: Internal selection
- Announcement date: 12 March 2018

Competing entry
- Song: "Bones"
- Artist: Equinox
- Songwriters: Borislav Milanov; Joacim Bo Persson; Trey Campbell; Dag Lundberg

Placement
- Semi-final result: Qualified (7th, 177 points)
- Final result: 14th, 166 points

Participation chronology

Bulgaria was represented at the Eurovision Song Contest 2018 with the song "Bones", written by Borislav Milanov, Joacim Bo Persson, Trey Campbell, and Dag Lundberg, and performed by the group Equinox. The Bulgarian participating broadcaster, Bulgarian National Television (BNT), organised the internal selection process BG Song 2018 in order to select its entry for the contest. On 12 March 2018, BNT announced that Equinox had been selected to compete with "Bones", which was presented to the public on the same day.

Bulgaria was drawn to compete in the first semi-final of the Eurovision Song Contest which took place on 8 May 2018. Performing during the show in position 19, "Bones" was announced among the top 10 entries of the first semi-final and therefore qualified to compete in the final on 12 May. It was later revealed that Bulgaria placed seventh out of the 19 participating countries in the semi-final with 177 points. In the final, Bulgaria performed in position 18 and placed fourteenth out of the 26 participating countries, scoring 166 points.

== Background ==
Prior to the 2018 contest, Bulgarian National Television (BNT) had participated in the Eurovision Song Contest representing Bulgaria eleven times since its first entry in 2005. It achieved their best result in 2017 with the song "Beautiful Mess" performed by Kristian Kostov, which placed second. To this point, only three Bulgarian entries had managed to have qualified to the Eurovision final, all of them which placed in the top ten; the nation had failed to qualify to the final with their other eight entries.

As part of its duties as participating broadcaster, BNT organises the selection of its entry in the Eurovision Song Contest and broadcasts the event in the country. The broadcaster confirmed its participation in the 2018 contest on 10 October 2017. In the past, BNT had alternated between both internal selections and national finals in order to select its entry. Since 2016, the broadcaster internally selected the entry for the competition, a selection procedure that continued for its 2018 entry.

== Before Eurovision ==
=== BG Song 2018 ===
The artist and song that represented Bulgaria at the Eurovision Song Contest 2018 was determined through the internal selection process BG Song 2018. On 14 November 2017, BNT opened a submission period for producers to submit their proposals until 29 December 2017. Each proposal was required to contain both the artist and song as well as the staging concept of the entry. Artists were required to be Bulgarian citizens and have experience of singing live, while eligible producers were those that have experience in artist management, are registered and licensed in PROFON, and have produced at least three projects which have had a high level of popularity in the past two years. Songs were required to contain partial Bulgarian involvement. A new feature of the selection process allowed for independent composers to submit their songs to be considered by interested producers.

On 30 December 2017, BNT announced that they received a record-breaking 202 songs by the end of the deadline, 13 of them being full projects. Three entries were shortlisted in late January 2018 after the projects were evaluated by four focus groups: music and television industry professionals, media representatives and betting experts, Bulgarian representatives and a public group of television viewers and Eurovision fans in a proportion representing the viewing structure of the Eurovision Song Contest. On 30 December 2017, the songtitles of the thirteen entries were announced.

- "A New Home"
- "Bad News"
- "Bones"
- "Choosing"
- "Cold as Ice"
- "Collide"
- "Colours"
- "Love Never Lies"
- "Lovers to Enemies"
- "Rebirth"
- "Sky Symphony"
- "Two Hearts Collide"
- "You Will Be the Change"

On 12 March 2018, BNT announced that the group Equinox had been selected to represent Bulgaria in Lisbon. Their song "Bones" was presented through the release of the official lyrics video via the official Eurovision Song Contest's YouTube channel. Equinox was formed specifically for the Eurovision Song Contest and consisted of Bulgarian singers Zhana Bergendorff, Georgi Simeonov and Vlado Mihailov, and American singers Johnny Manuel and Trey Campbell. Bergendorff previously won the second season of X Factor Bulgaria. "Bones" was written by members of the songwriting team Symphonix International: Borislav Milanov, Joacim Bo Persson, Campbell and Dag Lundberg.

=== Promotion ===
Equinox made several appearances across Europe to specifically promote "Bones" as the Bulgarian Eurovision entry. On 14 April, Equinox performed during the Eurovision in Concert event which was held at the AFAS Live venue in Amsterdam, Netherlands and hosted by Edsilia Rombley and Cornald Maas. On 17 April, Equinox performed during the London Eurovision Party, which was held at the Café de Paris venue in London, United Kingdom and hosted by Nicki French and Paddy O'Connell.

== At Eurovision ==
According to Eurovision rules, all nations with the exceptions of the host country and the "Big Five" (France, Germany, Italy, Spain and the United Kingdom) are required to qualify from one of two semi-finals in order to compete for the final; the top ten countries from each semi-final progress to the final. The European Broadcasting Union (EBU) split up the competing countries into six different pots based on voting patterns from previous contests, with countries with favourable voting histories put into the same pot. On 29 January 2018, a special allocation draw was held which placed each country into one of the two semi-finals, as well as which half of the show they would perform in. Bulgaria was placed into the first semi-final, to be held on 8 May 2018, and was scheduled to perform in the first half of the show.

Once all the competing songs for the 2018 contest had been released, the running order for the semi-finals was decided by the shows' producers rather than through another draw, so that similar songs were not placed next to each other. Bulgaria was set to perform in position 10, following the entry from Estonia and before the entry from Macedonia.

The two semi-finals and the final were broadcast in Bulgaria on BNT 1 with commentary by Elena Rosberg and Georgi Kushvaliev. The Bulgarian spokesperson, who announced the top 12-point score awarded by the Bulgarian jury during the final, was Joanna Dragneva who represented Bulgaria at the 2008 contest as the lead singer of Deep Zone.

=== Semi-final ===
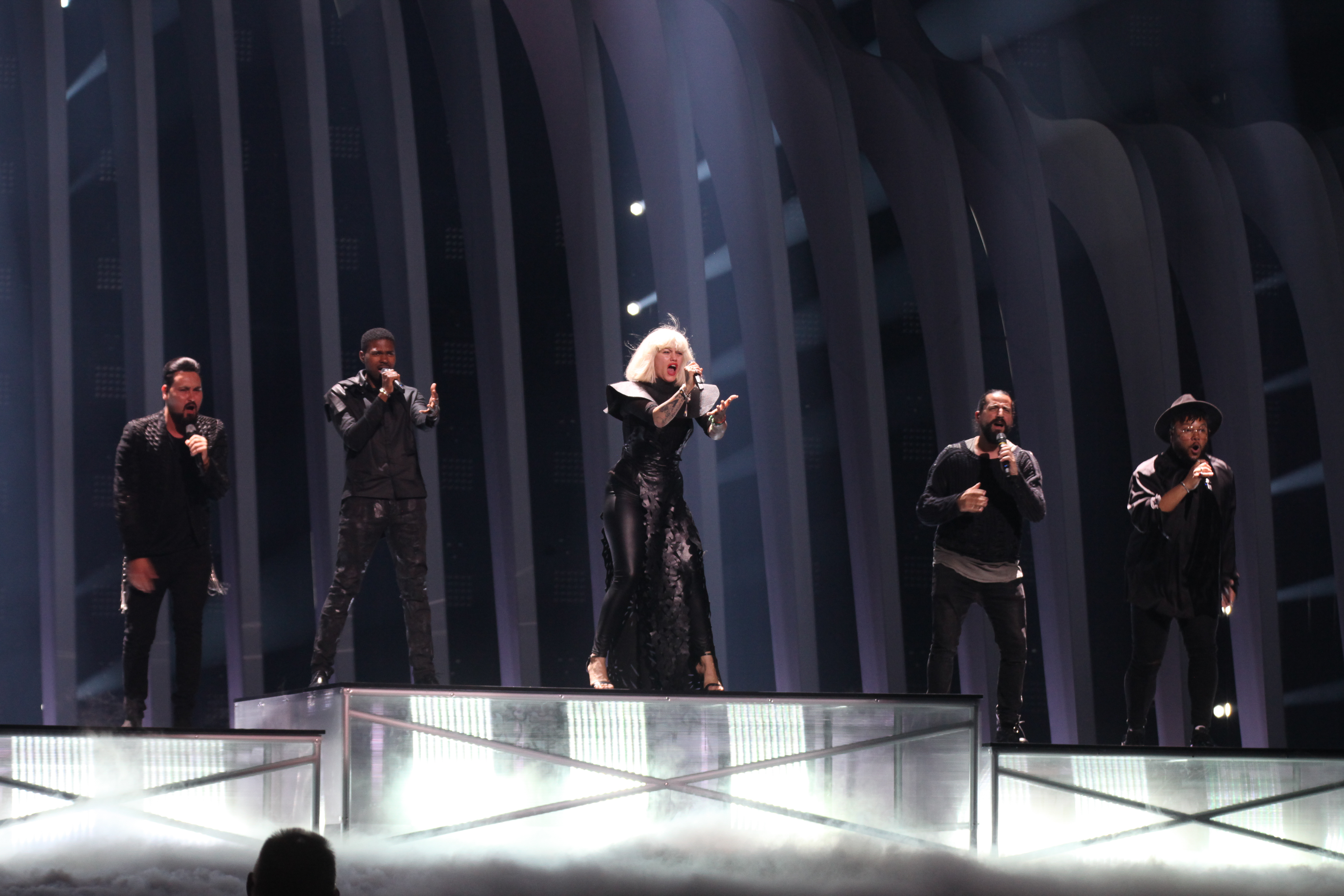
Equinox during a rehearsal before the first semi-final

Equinox took part in technical rehearsals on 29 April and 3 May, followed by dress rehearsals on 7 and 8 May. This included the jury show on 7 May where the professional juries of each country watched and voted on the competing entries.

The Bulgarian performance featured the members of Equinox in black outfits and performing on elevated glass podiums with smoke behind; Zhana Bergendorff wore a floor length dress with huge shoulder pads. Strobe lighting and a wind machine were used for the performance with overlaying camera shots also being used to create an effect that combined the group members into one. The stage concept and choreography of the Bulgarian performance was developed by Swedish artistic director Sacha Jean-Baptiste. An off-stage backing vocalist also joined Equinox: Maria Georgieva.

At the end of the show, Bulgaria was announced as having finished in the top 10 and subsequently qualifying for the grand final. It was later revealed that Bulgaria placed seventh in the semi-final, receiving a total of 177 points: 70 points from the televoting and 107 points from the juries.

=== Final ===
Shortly after the first semi-final, a winners' press conference was held for the ten qualifying countries. As part of this press conference, the qualifying artists took part in a draw to determine which half of the grand final they would subsequently participate in. This draw was done in the order the countries were announced during the semi-final. Bulgaria was drawn to compete in the second half. Following this draw, the shows' producers decided upon the running order of the final, as they had done for the semi-finals. Bulgaria was subsequently placed to perform in position 18, following the entry from Finland and before the entry from Moldova.

Equinox once again took part in dress rehearsals on 11 and 12 May before the final, including the jury final where the professional juries cast their final votes before the live show. The group performed a repeat of their semi-final performance during the final on 12 May. Bulgaria placed fourteenth in the final, scoring 166 points: 66 points from the televoting and 100 points from the juries.

=== Voting ===
Voting during the three shows involved each country awarding two sets of points from 1-8, 10 and 12: one from their professional jury and the other from televoting. Each nation's jury consisted of five music industry professionals who are citizens of the country they represent, with their names published before the contest to ensure transparency. This jury judged each entry based on: vocal capacity; the stage performance; the song's composition and originality; and the overall impression by the act. In addition, no member of a national jury was permitted to be related in any way to any of the competing acts in such a way that they cannot vote impartially and independently. The individual rankings of each jury member as well as the nation's televoting results were released shortly after the grand final.

Below is a breakdown of points awarded to Bulgaria and awarded by Bulgaria in the first semi-final and grand final of the contest, and the breakdown of the jury voting and televoting conducted during the two shows:

==== Points awarded to Bulgaria ====
Points awarded to Bulgaria (Semi-final 1)
Score	Televote	Jury
12 points		Macedonia; United Kingdom
10 points	Cyprus	Finland
8 points	Macedonia; Spain	
7 points	Greece	Czech Republic; Estonia; Portugal
6 points	United Kingdom	Albania; Croatia; Cyprus; Greece; Ireland
5 points	Albania; Austria; Belarus	Belarus
4 points	Azerbaijan	Austria
3 points	Ireland; Israel	Lithuania; Spain; Switzerland
2 points	Armenia; Czech Republic; Lithuania	Azerbaijan; Belgium
1 point		

Points awarded to Bulgaria (Final)
Score	Televote	Jury
12 points	Cyprus	
10 points		Finland; Ireland
8 points		Albania; Moldova; United Kingdom
7 points	Macedonia; Malta	Croatia; Estonia; Portugal
6 points	Albania; United Kingdom	Austria; Georgia; Sweden
5 points	Greece; Romania; Spain	Azerbaijan
4 points	Montenegro	Czech Republic
3 points	Moldova	
2 points	Serbia	Malta; Poland; Switzerland
1 point	Azerbaijan; Belarus; Croatia; Czech Republic	Denmark; Israel

==== Points awarded by Bulgaria ====
Points awarded by Bulgaria (Semi-final 1)
Score	Televote	Jury
12 points	Cyprus	Belgium
10 points	Greece	Lithuania
8 points	Austria	Austria
7 points	Israel	Czech Republic
6 points	Armenia	Albania
5 points	Macedonia	Israel
4 points	Estonia	Croatia
3 points	Czech Republic	Cyprus
2 points	Belarus	Armenia
1 point	Finland	Finland

Points awarded by Bulgaria (Final)
Score	Televote	Jury
12 points	Cyprus	Austria
10 points	Israel	Lithuania
8 points	Moldova	Czech Republic
7 points	Serbia	Albania
6 points	Italy	Germany
5 points	Hungary	France
4 points	Austria	Israel
3 points	Czech Republic	Cyprus
2 points	Estonia	Sweden
1 point	Ukraine	Ireland

==== Detailed voting results ====
The following members comprised the Bulgarian jury:

- Maya Raykova (jury chairperson) – music producer
- Aleksey Vasilev – music editor, music programming expert
- Maria Mutafchieva – Mary – singer, songwriter
- Lora Kotseva – radio host
- Kalin Veliov – musician, producer, composer, singer

Detailed voting results from Bulgaria (Semi-final 1)
R/O	Country	Jury							Televote	
R/O	Country	A. Vasilev	Mary	L. Kozeva	M. Raykova	K. Veliov	Rank	Points	Rank	Points
01	Azerbaijan	14	6	8	7	8	11		13	
02	Iceland	18	18	13	18	16	18		18	
03	Albania	12	1	17	5	2	5	6	15	
04	Belgium	9	2	2	3	1	1	12	16	
05	Czech Republic	6	8	5	2	3	4	7	8	3
06	Lithuania	10	4	3	1	4	2	10	14	
07	Israel	4	10	4	6	7	6	5	4	7
08	Belarus	8	5	11	12	10	12		9	2
09	Estonia	11	16	10	17	18	16		7	4
10	Bulgaria									
11	Macedonia	13	13	14	14	11	15		6	5
12	Croatia	5	14	1	15	12	7	4	17	
13	Austria	3	3	6	4	6	3	8	3	8
14	Greece	17	15	16	16	14	17		2	10
15	Finland	2	17	7	9	17	10	1	10	1
16	Armenia	7	7	9	10	5	9	2	5	6
17	Switzerland	16	11	12	11	13	13		12	
18	Ireland	15	12	18	8	15	14		11	
19	Cyprus	1	9	15	13	9	8	3	1	12

Detailed voting results from Bulgaria (Final)
R/O	Country	Jury							Televote	
R/O	Country	A. Vasilev	Mary	L. Kozeva	M. Raykova	K. Veliov	Rank	Points	Rank	Points
01	Ukraine	17	19	8	13	15	14		10	1
02	Spain	13	21	9	12	12	13		22	
03	Slovenia	8	16	13	24	17	15		25	
04	Lithuania	14	3	1	1	6	2	10	19	
05	Austria	9	2	2	2	1	1	12	7	4
06	Estonia	18	20	23	21	21	25		9	2
07	Norway	12	13	11	6	10	11		15	
08	Portugal	22	22	14	15	16	22		24	
09	United Kingdom	23	23	7	16	19	16		23	
10	Serbia	20	11	19	22	18	19		4	7
11	Germany	7	4	3	3	9	5	6	11	
12	Albania	16	1	4	9	3	4	7	13	
13	France	1	7	12	10	5	6	5	17	
14	Czech Republic	3	5	5	5	2	3	8	8	3
15	Denmark	24	15	22	18	20	23		14	
16	Australia	11	18	21	19	25	21		18	
17	Finland	10	17	20	11	22	17		16	
18	Bulgaria									
19	Moldova	15	10	24	23	14	18		3	8
20	Sweden	4	14	18	8	7	9	2	20	
21	Hungary	25	9	25	25	23	20		6	5
22	Israel	6	8	10	7	4	7	4	2	10
23	Netherlands	5	12	17	14	11	12		12	
24	Ireland	21	24	6	4	13	10	1	21	
25	Cyprus	2	6	16	17	8	8	3	1	12
26	Italy	19	25	15	20	24	24		5	6
