= Australia in the Eurovision Song Contest 2018 =

- Eurovision Song Contest 2018
- Participating broadcaster: Special Broadcasting Service (SBS)
- Country: Australia
- Selection process: Internal selection
- Announcement date: Artist: 11 December 2017; Song: 8 March 2018

Competing entry
- Song: "We Got Love"
- Artist: Jessica Mauboy
- Songwriters: Anthony Egizii; David Musumeci; Jessica Mauboy

Placement
- Semi-final result: Qualified (4th, 212 points)
- Final result: 20th, 99 points

Participation chronology

Australia was represented at the Eurovision Song Contest 2018 with the song "We Got Love", written by Anthony Egizii, David Musumeci, and Jessica Mauboy, and performed by Mauboy herself. The Australian participating broadcaster, Special Broadcasting Service (SBS), internally selected its entry for the contest. Mauboy was announced as the Australian representative on 11 December 2017, the song "We Got Love" was presented to the public on 8 March 2018.

Australia debuted in the Eurovision Song Contest in 2015 by invitation from the European Broadcasting Union (EBU) as a "one-off" special guest to celebrate the 60th anniversary of Eurovision. On 17 November 2015, the EBU announced that SBS had been invited to participate in the 2016 contest and that Australia would once again take part. In 2015, Australia was guaranteed a spot in the final of the contest and was allowed to vote during both semi-finals and the final; however, from the 2016 contest and onwards, Australia would have to qualify to the final from one of two semi-finals and could only vote in the semi-final in which the nation was allocated to compete.

Australia was drawn to compete in the second semi-final of the Eurovision Song Contest which took place on 10 May 2018. Performing during the show in position 9, "We Got Love" was announced among the top 10 entries of the second semi-final and therefore qualified to compete in the final on 12 May. It was later revealed that Australia placed fourth out of the 18 participating countries in the semi-final with 212 points. In the final, Australia performed in position 16 and placed twentieth out of the 26 participating countries, scoring 99 points.

== Background ==
Special Broadcasting Service (SBS) has broadcast the Eurovision Song Contest since 1983, and the contest has gained a cult following over that time, primarily due to the country's strong political and cultural ties with Europe. Paying tribute to this, the 2014 contest semi-finals included an interval act featuring Australian singer Jessica Mauboy. Australian singers have also participated at Eurovision as representatives of other countries, including Olivia Newton-John (United Kingdom 1974), two-time winner Johnny Logan (Ireland 1980 and 1987), Gina G (United Kingdom 1996), and Jane Comerford as lead singer of Texas Lightning (Germany 2006).

Tying in with the goal of Eurovision—to showcase "the importance of bringing countries together to celebrate diversity, music and culture", the 2015 theme of "Building Bridges", and arguing that they could not hold "the world's biggest party" to celebrate the 60th edition of Eurovision without inviting Australia, the EBU announced on 10 February 2015 that the country would compete at that year's edition as a special guest participant. Along with the "Big Five" (France, Germany, Italy, Spain and the United Kingdom), and the host country of Austria, Australia was given automatic entry into the final to "not reduce the chances" of the semi-final participants. On 17 November 2015, the EBU announced that SBS had been invited to participate in the 2016 contest and that Australia would once again take part, however they would have to qualify for the final from one of two semi-finals and could only vote in the semi-final in which the nation was competing. On 23 August 2017, SBS confirmed Australia's participation in the 2018 Eurovision Song Contest after securing an invitation for the fourth year in a row. In 2017, Australia was represented by Isaiah Firebrace and the song "Don't Come Easy". The country ended in ninth place in the grand final with 173 points.

== Before Eurovision ==
=== Internal selection ===
Jessica Mauboy was announced as the artist that would represent Australia at the Eurovision Song Contest 2018 on 11 December 2017. Mauboy had previously performed at the interval act at the second semi final of the 2014 contest, the year before Australia debuted at the 2015 contest. In regards to her selection as the Australian representative, Mauboy stated: "Eurovision is a wonderfully joyous and unique event. It brings together over 40 diverse countries and cultures under one roof to unite us all in music. It shows how much the power of song can transcend differences. I will sing my heart out for Australia, I'm so proud to be officially representing my country and a little bit nervous - mainly about the stress of the dress!"

The official video and digital download release of Jessica Mauboy's Eurovision song, "We Got Love", occurred on 8 March 2018. The song was written by Mauboy along with the songwriting and production team DNA Songs, which consists of Anthony Egizii and David Musumeci.

I love the Eurovision Song Contest. I have since I was a little girl watching it with the family in Darwin. I wanted to write a song that captured that instinctive sense of joy of how a great song can change the darkest of moods into happiness. "We Got Love" is also about how music can lift the human spirit. You can always rise above in the hardest times with something as simple as a great song. Eurovision, to me, is people brought together through a real love of music and all the joy that music can bring. I can’t wait to perform this song live in Portugal and see it connect with a global audience at such a special time.

— Jessica Mauboy about "We Got Love"

== At Eurovision ==
According to Eurovision rules, all nations with the exceptions of the host country and the "Big Five" (France, Germany, Italy, Spain and the United Kingdom) are required to qualify from one of two semi-finals in order to compete for the final; the top ten countries from each semi-final progress to the final. The European Broadcasting Union (EBU) split up the competing countries into six different pots based on voting patterns from previous contests, with countries with favourable voting histories put into the same pot. On 29 January 2018, a special allocation draw was held which placed each country into one of the two semi-finals, as well as which half of the show they would perform in. Australia was placed into the second semi-final, to be held on 10 May 2018, and was scheduled to perform in the first half of the show.

=== Semi-final ===
Once all the competing songs for the 2018 contest had been released, the running order for the semi-finals was decided by the shows' producers rather than through another draw, so that similar songs were not placed next to each other. Australia performed ninth in the second semi-final, following the entry from Netherlands and preceding the entry from Georgia. At the end of the show, Australia was announced as having finished in the top 10 and subsequently qualifying for the grand final. It was later revealed that Australia placed fourth in the semi-final, receiving a total of 212 points: 82 points from the televoting and 130 points from the juries.

=== Final ===
Shortly after the second semi-final, a winners' press conference was held for the ten qualifying countries. As part of this press conference, the qualifying artists took part in a draw to determine which half of the grand final they would subsequently participate in. This draw was done in the reverse order the countries appeared in the semi-final running order. Australia was drawn to compete in the second half. Following this draw, the shows' producers decided upon the running order of the final, as they had done for the semi-finals. Australia was subsequently placed to perform in position 16, following the entry from Denmark and before the entry from Finland. During the final on 12 May. Australia placed twentieth in the final, scoring 99 points: 9 points from the televoting and 90 points from the juries.

=== Voting ===
Voting during the three shows involved each country awarding two sets of points from 1–8, 10 and 12: one from their professional jury and the other from televoting. Each nation's jury consisted of five music industry professionals who are citizens of the country they represent, with their names published before the contest to ensure transparency. This jury judged each entry based on: vocal capacity; the stage performance; the song's composition and originality; and the overall impression by the act. In addition, no member of a national jury was permitted to be related in any way to any of the competing acts in such a way that they cannot vote impartially and independently. The individual rankings of each jury member as well as the nation's televoting results were released shortly after the grand final.

==== Points awarded to Australia ====
Points awarded to Australia (Semi-final 2)
Score	Televote	Jury
12 points		Denmark; France; Latvia
10 points	Malta	Hungary; Moldova; Norway; Sweden
8 points	Denmark; Norway	Germany; Poland
7 points	Germany; Romania; Sweden	Italy; Malta
6 points	France	Serbia; Ukraine
5 points	Moldova	
4 points	Netherlands; San Marino; Slovenia	Netherlands
3 points	Hungary; Poland; Serbia	Montenegro; Russia
2 points	Latvia	Slovenia
1 point	Russia	

Points awarded to Australia (Final)
Score	Televote	Jury
12 points		
10 points		Denmark; France
8 points		Sweden
7 points		Germany; Hungary; Israel; Moldova
6 points	Malta	Latvia; Norway
5 points		Russia
4 points		Poland
3 points		Malta
2 points	Denmark	Armenia; Belarus; Romania; San Marino; Ukraine
1 point	United Kingdom	

==== Points awarded by Australia ====
Points awarded by Australia (Semi-final 2)
Score	Televote	Jury
12 points	Denmark	Sweden
10 points	Moldova	Moldova
8 points	Sweden	Norway
7 points	Malta	Ukraine
6 points	Norway	Denmark
5 points	Ukraine	Latvia
4 points	Slovenia	Hungary
3 points	Hungary	Malta
2 points	San Marino	Slovenia
1 point	Netherlands	Netherlands

Points awarded by Australia (Final)
Score	Televote	Jury
12 points	Israel	Sweden
10 points	Denmark	Germany
8 points	Ireland	Estonia
7 points	Cyprus	Spain
6 points	United Kingdom	Israel
5 points	Moldova	Austria
4 points	Finland	Ireland
3 points	Czech Republic	Lithuania
2 points	Germany	Moldova
1 point	Norway	Czech Republic

==== Detailed voting results ====
The following members comprised the Australian jury:

- Richard Wilkins (jury chairperson) – radio DJ, entertainment journalist
- Jordan Raskopoulos – comedian, singer, writer
- Sukhdeep Singh Bhogal (L-FRESH the Lion) – artist
- Susanna Rowe (Zan Rowe) – radio broadcaster, music journalist
- Peta Jane Millgate (Milie Millgate) – executive producer at Sounds Australia, music export

Detailed voting results from Australia (Semi-final 2)
R/O	Country	Jury							Televote	
R/O	Country	R. Wilkins	J. Raskopoulos	L-Fresh the Lion	Z. Rowe	M. Millgate	Rank	Points	Rank	Points
01	Norway	1	15	8	3	3	3	8	5	6
02	Romania	4	17	12	9	16	12		14	
03	Serbia	14	12	11	7	12	14		12	
04	San Marino	17	16	10	16	7	15		9	2
05	Denmark	15	6	16	10	1	5	6	1	12
06	Russia	12	13	13	8	15	16		17	
07	Moldova	10	2	4	2	4	2	10	2	10
08	Netherlands	13	11	3	13	10	10	1	10	1
09	Australia									
10	Georgia	11	3	14	12	11	11		15	
11	Poland	16	9	17	15	8	17		13	
12	Malta	7	10	5	4	17	8	3	4	7
13	Hungary	9	4	7	11	6	7	4	8	3
14	Latvia	2	5	15	14	9	6	5	11	
15	Sweden	3	1	1	1	2	1	12	3	8
16	Montenegro	5	14	9	17	14	13		16	
17	Slovenia	8	8	6	5	13	9	2	7	4
18	Ukraine	6	7	2	6	5	4	7	6	5

Detailed voting results from Australia (Final)
R/O	Country	Jury							Televote	
R/O	Country	R. Wilkins	J. Raskopoulos	L-Fresh the Lion	Z. Rowe	M. Millgate	Rank	Points	Rank	Points
01	Ukraine	21	10	7	12	16	15		16	
02	Spain	2	25	2	17	13	4	7	25	
03	Slovenia	25	23	18	22	25	25		14	
04	Lithuania	1	22	4	25	19	8	3	20	
05	Austria	17	4	5	3	22	6	5	13	
06	Estonia	10	3	1	9	20	3	8	11	
07	Norway	11	14	13	11	10	16		10	1
08	Portugal	6	24	20	20	24	18		24	
09	United Kingdom	19	19	14	15	11	21		5	6
10	Serbia	20	21	11	18	17	23		21	
11	Germany	3	2	3	2	7	2	10	9	2
12	Albania	13	13	6	19	8	14		23	
13	France	16	12	21	21	14	22		18	
14	Czech Republic	18	17	25	24	1	10	1	8	3
15	Denmark	15	6	15	16	6	13		2	10
16	Australia									
17	Finland	23	20	19	13	21	24		7	4
18	Bulgaria	22	18	24	7	23	20		19	
19	Moldova	14	5	9	6	18	9	2	6	5
20	Sweden	4	1	8	1	2	1	12	12	
21	Hungary	24	11	16	14	12	19		15	
22	Israel	9	8	10	4	4	5	6	1	12
23	Netherlands	7	16	12	23	15	17		22	
24	Ireland	8	7	23	5	3	7	4	3	8
25	Cyprus	5	9	22	10	9	11		4	7
26	Italy	12	15	17	8	5	12		17	
