= Hyży =

Hyży is a Polish surname. Notable people with this surname include:

- Grzegorz Hyży (born 1987), Polish singer
- Julie Hyzy, American author of mystery fiction
- Maja Hyży (born 1989), Polish singer
