= Mélovin =

Ukrainian singer and songwriter (born 1997)

Mélovin Ме́ловін
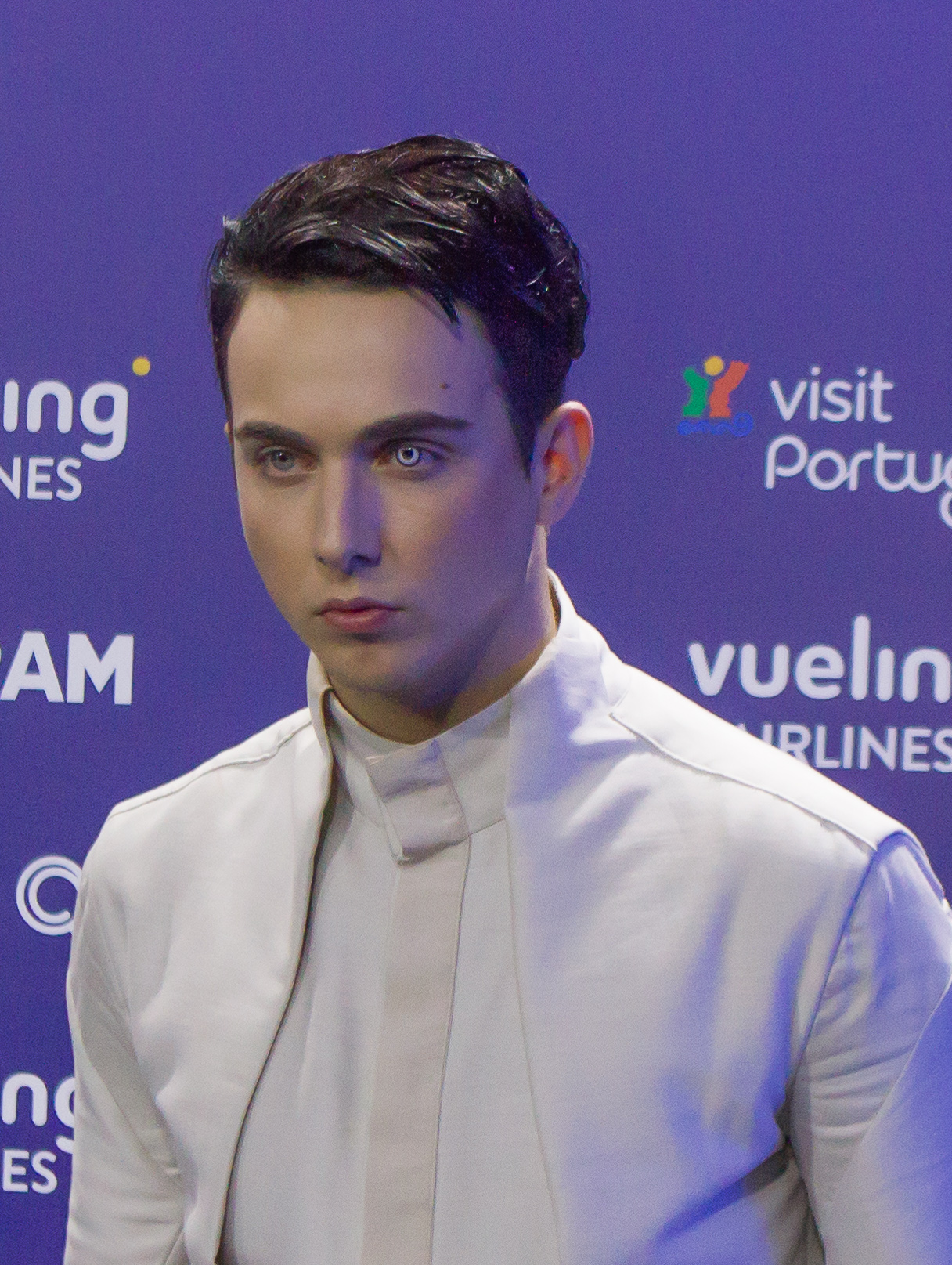
- Mélovin at the Eurovision Song Contest 2018

Background information
- Born: Kostiantyn Mykolaiovych Bocharov; 11 April 1997 (age 28); Odesa, Ukraine
- Genres: Electropop; Pop rock
- Occupations: Singer; songwriter
- Instrument: Vocals, Piano
- Years active: 2015–present
- Website: melovinmusic.com

Kostiantyn Mykolaiovych Bocharov (Ukrainian: Костянти́н Микола́йович Бочаро́в, IPA: [kosʲtʲɐnˈtɪn mɪkoˈlɑjowɪdʒ botʃɐˈrɔu̯]; born 11 April 1997), better known by his stage name Mélovin (stylised in all caps; Ukrainian: Ме́ловін, IPA: [ˈmɛlowin]), is a Ukrainian singer and songwriter. He first came to prominence after winning season six of X-Factor Ukraine.

He represented Ukraine in the Eurovision Song Contest 2018 in Lisbon, Portugal, with the song "Under the Ladder", finishing in seventeenth place, with 130 points.

== Early life ==
Bocharov was born in Odesa to parents Mykola Bocharov and Valentyna Bocharova. He became interested in music at a young age, and as a child would put on and perform in concerts at his school. He later began attending a music school, but left before graduating. He subsequently enrolled in a theatre school, which he graduated from.

== Career ==
=== 2015–2016: X-Factor Ukraine ===
Bocharov had auditioned for X-Factor Ukraine three times, but never got onto the televised show. Eventually, he passed his audition for the show's sixth season in 2015. He advanced through the competition and was eventually declared the winner. Following the show's completion, he went on a tour of Ukraine along with the show's other finalists. In 2016, he released his debut single "Ne odinokaya".

=== 2017–2018: Eurovision ===
On 17 January 2017, Bocharov was announced as one of the 23 competitors in Vidbir 2017, the Ukrainian national selection for the Eurovision Song Contest 2017, with the song "Wonder". Bocharov competed in the third semi-final on 18 February 2017, where he placed second and qualified to the final as one of the top two finishers. In the semi-final, he received the highest number of televotes from the Ukrainian public but only placed fourth with the jury consisting of Konstantin Meladze, Jamala, and Andriy Danylko. The final was held on 25 February 2017. Bocharov placed third, after receiving the highest number of televotes from the Ukrainian public again, but placing second-to-last with the jury.

Mélovin singing his 2018 Eurovision entry Under The Ladder a cappella.

Chat with Mélovin during the Eurovision Song Contest 2018.

The following year, Bocharov confirmed his return to Vidbir on 16 January 2018 after being confirmed as one of the 18 competing acts in Vidbir 2018 with the song "Under the Ladder". He competed in the second semi-final on 17 February 2018, where he qualified to the final as one of the top three finishers, placing first with the highest number of televotes from the Ukrainian public and second-highest number of jury votes from the jury consisting of Jamala, Danylko, and Eugene Filatov. He won the final on 24 February and thus represented Ukraine in the Eurovision Song Contest 2018 in Lisbon, Portugal. He placed 17th in the voting in Eurovision Song Contest 2018 final, gaining only eleven points from juries of 43 countries and 119 points from televiewers all around the world. After Eurovision 2018, he went on to release his new single "That's Your Role".

=== 2019–present: other ventures ===
Bocharov won the second season of The Masked Singer Ukraine in December 2021.

He attempted to represent Ukraine again in the Eurovision Song Contest 2024, being selected among the finalists of Vidbir 2024 with the song "Dreamer". He finished in third place.

== Discography ==
=== Extended plays ===
Title	Details
Face to Face	Released: 10 November 2017; Label: UMPG; Format: Digital download, CD

=== Singles ===
Title	Year	Peak chart positions		Album
Title	Year	UKR Airplay	SWE Heat.	Album
"Ne odinokaya (Не одинокая)"	2016	—	—	Non-album singles
"Na vzlyot (На взлёт)"	2016	—	—	Non-album singles
"Wonder"	2016	—	—	Face to Face
"Unbroken"	2017	—	—	Face to Face
"Hooligan"	2017	—	—	Face to Face
"Play This Life"	2017	—	—	Face to Face
"Face to Face"	2017	—	—	Face to Face
"Svit v poloni" (Світ в полоні)	2017	—	—	Face to Face
"Under the Ladder"	2018	54	9	Octopus
"That's Your Role"	2018	—	—	Octopus
"Z toboyu, zi mnoyu, i hodi (З тобою, зі мною, і годі)"	2018	—	—	Octopus
"Chudova Mytʹ (Чудова Мить)"	2018	—	—	Non-album single
"Ty (Ти)"	2019	4	—	Octopus
"Oh, No!"	2019	—	—	Octopus
"Expectations"	2019	—	—	Octopus
"Your Entertainment"	2019	—	—	Octopus
"Want You to Stay"	2019	—	—	Octopus
"Vitryla (Вітрила)"	2019	10	—	Non-album single
"Dance with the Devil"	2020	—	—	Non-album single
"I krov kypyt' (І кров кипить)"	2021	23	—	Non-album single
"Tayemnyy znak' (Таємний знак) (with Sowa)	2021	—	—	Non-album single
"Kit i drama' (Кіт і Драма)	2021	—	—	Non-album single
"Ne zvolikay (Не зволікай)"	2022	—	—	Non-album single
"Meni ne dzvony (Мені не дзвони)	2022	-	-	Non-album single

== Personal life ==
On 5 July 2021, Bocharov came out as bisexual in a concert, followed by an Instagram post. On 3 November 2025, he became engaged to Petro Zlotia, a paramedic of the Armed Forces of Ukraine.

Awards and achievements
Preceded by Dmitry Babak	X-Factor Ukraine; Winner; 2015	Succeeded by Sevak Khanagyan
Preceded by O.Torvald with "Time"	Ukraine in the Eurovision Song Contest; 2018	Succeeded by Go A with "Solovey"(Соловей)
