= Georgia in the Eurovision Song Contest 2018 =

- Eurovision Song Contest 2018
- Participating broadcaster: Georgian Public Broadcaster (GPB)
- Country: Georgia
- Selection process: Internal selection
- Announcement date: Artist: 31 December 2017; Song: 13 March 2018

Competing entry
- Song: "For You"
- Artist: Ethno-Jazz Band Iriao
- Songwriters: Davit Malazonia; Mikheil Mdinaradze; Irina Sanikidze

Placement
- Semi-final result: Failed to qualify (18th)

Participation chronology

Georgia was represented at the Eurovision Song Contest 2018 with the song "For You" written by Davit Malazonia, Mikheil Mdinaradze and Irina Sanikidze. The song was performed by the Ethno-Jazz Band Iriao, which was internally selected in December 2017 by the Georgian broadcaster Georgian Public Broadcaster (GPB) to compete at the 2018 contest in Lisbon, Portugal. The Georgian entry, "For You", was presented to the public on 13 March 2018.

Georgia was drawn to compete in the second semi-final of the Eurovision Song Contest which took place on 10 May 2018. Performing during the show in position 10, "For You" was not announced among the top 10 entries of the second semi-final and therefore did not qualify to compete in the final. It was later revealed that Georgia placed eighteenth (last) out of the 18 participating countries in the semi-final with 24 points.

== Background ==
Prior to the 2018 contest, Georgia had participated in the Eurovision Song Contest ten times since their first entry in 2007. The nation's highest placing in the contest, to this point, has been ninth place, which was achieved on two occasions: in 2010 with the song "Shine" performed by Sofia Nizharadze and in 2011 with the song "One More Day" performed by Eldrine. The nation briefly withdrew from the contest in 2009 after the European Broadcasting Union (EBU) rejected the Georgian entry, "We Don't Wanna Put In", for perceived political references to Vladimir Putin who was the Russian Prime Minister at the time. The withdrawal and fallout was tied to tense relations between Georgia and then host country Russia, which stemmed from the 2008 Russo-Georgian War. Georgia had, to this point, failed to qualify to the final on three occasions. In 2017, Georgia failed to qualify to the final with the song "Keep the Faith" performed by Tamara Gachechiladze.

The Georgian national broadcaster, Georgian Public Broadcaster (GPB), broadcasts the event within Georgia and organises the selection process for the nation's entry. GPB confirmed their intentions to participate at the 2018 Eurovision Song Contest on 2 October 2017. Georgia has selected their entry for the Eurovision Song Contest both through national finals and internal selections in the past. In 2017, the Georgian entry was selected via a national final. For their 2018 participation, GPB opted to internally select the Georgian entry.

== Before Eurovision ==
=== Internal selection ===
On 31 December 2017, the broadcaster announced that they had internally selected the band Iriao to represent Georgia in Lisbon. GPB also announced that the music director of the band Davit Malazonia would create their song. The song "For You", composed by Davit Malazonia and Mikheil Mdinaradze with lyrics by Irina Sanikidze, premiered on 13 March 2018 together with the music video on the GPB First Channel's YouTube channel. The music video was filmed at the First Cosmic Object in Saguramo and was directed by Zaza Orashvili. "For You" was the first song performed entirely in the Georgian language that was selected to represent Georgia at the Eurovision Song Contest.

=== Promotion ===
Prior to the contest, Ethno-Jazz Band Iriao specifically promoted "For You" as the Georgian Eurovision entry between 8 and 11 April 2018 by taking part in promotional activities in Tel Aviv, Israel and performing during the Israel Calling event held at the Rabin Square.

== At Eurovision ==
According to Eurovision rules, all nations with the exceptions of the host country and the "Big Five" (France, Germany, Italy, Spain and the United Kingdom) are required to qualify from one of two semi-finals in order to compete for the final; the top ten countries from each semi-final progress to the final. The European Broadcasting Union (EBU) split up the competing countries into six different pots based on voting patterns from previous contests, with countries with favourable voting histories put into the same pot. On 29 January 2018, a special allocation draw was held which placed each country into one of the two semi-finals, as well as which half of the show they would perform in. Georgia was placed into the second semi-final, to be held on 10 May 2018, and was scheduled to perform in the second half of the show.

Once all the competing songs for the 2018 contest had been released, the running order for the semi-finals was decided by the shows' producers rather than through another draw, so that similar songs were not placed next to each other. Georgia was set to perform in position 10, following the entry from Australia and before the entry from Poland.

The two semi-finals and the final were broadcast in Georgia on GPB First Channel with commentary by Demetre Ergemlidze. The Georgian spokesperson, who announced the top 12-point score awarded by the Georgian jury during the final, was 2017 Georgian Eurovision entrant Tamara Gachechiladze.

=== Semi-final ===
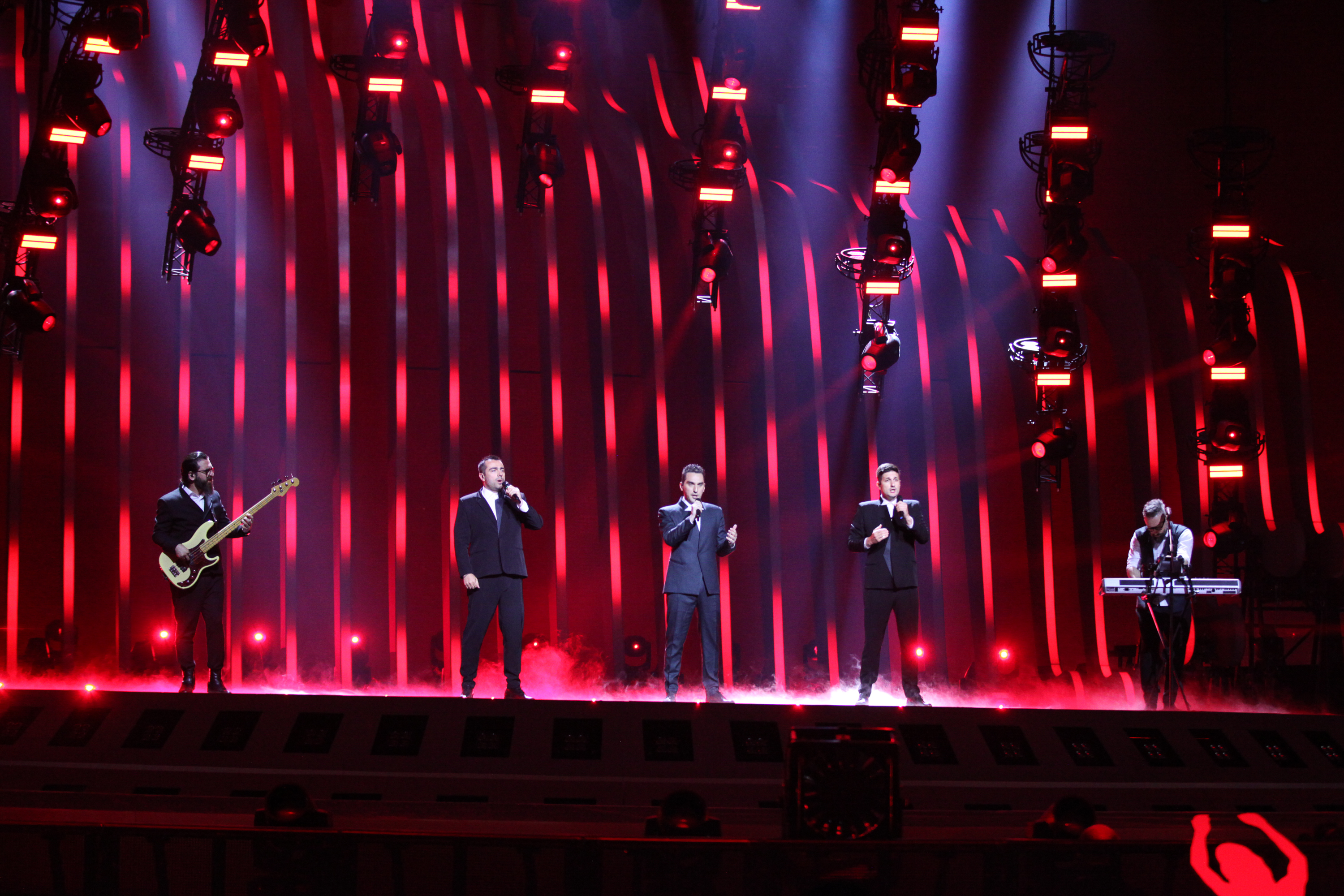
Ethno-Jazz Band Iriao during a rehearsal before the second semi-final

Ethno-Jazz Band Iriao took part in technical rehearsals on 2 and 5 May, followed by dress rehearsals on 9 and 10 May. This included the jury show on 9 May where the professional juries of each country watched and voted on the competing entries.

The Georgian performance featured the members of Ethno-Jazz Band Iriao dressed in black and dark blue suits with the stage colours transitioning from blue to red. The performance began with the three vocalists of the band spread out across the stage, all of them which later formed a line with the remaining two members at the left and right hand sides of the stage playing the keyboard and guitar, respectively, and performed arm choreography after switching positions. The performance also featured smoke effects and a pyrotechnic waterfall. The staging director for the Georgian performance was Zaza Orashvili.

At the end of the show, Georgia was not announced among the top 10 entries in the second semi-final and therefore failed to qualify to compete in the final. It was later revealed that Georgia placed eighteenth (last) in the semi-final, receiving a total of 24 points: 13 points from the televoting and 11 points from the juries.

=== Voting ===
Voting during the three shows involved each country awarding two sets of points from 1–8, 10 and 12: one from their professional jury and the other from televoting. Each nation's jury consisted of five music industry professionals who are citizens of the country they represent, with their names published before the contest to ensure transparency. This jury judged each entry based on: vocal capacity; the stage performance; the song's composition and originality; and the overall impression by the act. In addition, no member of a national jury was permitted to be related in any way to any of the competing acts in such a way that they cannot vote impartially and independently. The individual rankings of each jury member as well as the nation's televoting results were released shortly after the grand final.

Below is a breakdown of points awarded to Georgia and awarded by Georgia in the second semi-final and grand final of the contest, and the breakdown of the jury voting and televoting conducted during the two shows:

==== Points awarded to Georgia ====
Points awarded to Georgia (Semi-final 2)
Score	Televote	Jury
12 points		
10 points		
8 points		Ukraine
7 points		
6 points		
5 points	Latvia; Ukraine	
4 points		
3 points	Russia	
2 points		Latvia
1 point		Hungary

==== Points awarded by Georgia ====
Points awarded by Georgia (Semi-final 2)
Score	Televote	Jury
12 points	Moldova	Sweden
10 points	Ukraine	Netherlands
8 points	Romania	Latvia
7 points	Latvia	Ukraine
6 points	Russia	Romania
5 points	Norway	Norway
4 points	Hungary	Malta
3 points	Denmark	Moldova
2 points	Sweden	Hungary
1 point	Netherlands	Slovenia

Points awarded by Georgia (Final)
Score	Televote	Jury
12 points	Israel	Sweden
10 points	Cyprus	Estonia
8 points	Ukraine	Austria
7 points	Lithuania	Germany
6 points	Estonia	Bulgaria
5 points	Italy	Netherlands
4 points	France	Albania
3 points	Moldova	Israel
2 points	Denmark	Lithuania
1 point	Austria	Denmark

==== Detailed voting results ====
The following members comprised the Georgian jury:

- David Evgenidze (jury chairperson) – composer, musician (jury member in semi-final 2)
- Zurab Ramishvili – jazz musician
- Eliso Shengelia – musical producer
- Salome Bakuradze – singer
- Kakhaber Grigalashvili – singer
- Mariko Ebralidze – singer, represented Georgia in the 2014 contest (jury member in the final)

Detailed voting results from Georgia (Semi-final 2)
R/O	Country	Jury							Televote	
R/O	Country	D. Evgenidze	Z. Ramishvili	E. Shengelia	S. Bakuradze	K. Grigalashvili	Rank	Points	Rank	Points
01	Norway	5	4	5	11	12	6	5	6	5
02	Romania	15	5	13	4	3	5	6	3	8
03	Serbia	9	17	11	14	10	12		11	
04	San Marino	12	16	15	15	16	16		15	
05	Denmark	10	15	10	13	15	14		8	3
06	Russia	13	14	12	16	14	15		5	6
07	Moldova	6	11	14	8	5	8	3	1	12
08	Netherlands	2	2	2	3	4	2	10	10	1
09	Australia	16	13	16	6	7	11		13	
10	Georgia									
11	Poland	14	10	9	12	17	13		14	
12	Malta	8	8	8	5	6	7	4	16	
13	Hungary	7	9	7	10	8	9	2	7	4
14	Latvia	3	3	3	2	2	3	8	4	7
15	Sweden	1	1	1	1	1	1	12	9	2
16	Montenegro	17	12	17	17	13	17		17	
17	Slovenia	11	7	6	9	11	10	1	12	
18	Ukraine	4	6	4	7	9	4	7	2	10

Detailed voting results from Georgia (Final)
R/O	Country	Jury							Televote	
R/O	Country	Z. Ramishvili	E. Shengelia	S. Bakuradze	K. Grigalashvili	M. Ebralidze	Rank	Points	Rank	Points
01	Ukraine	25	25	15	15	10	20		3	8
02	Spain	19	18	14	8	18	15		24	
03	Slovenia	17	22	17	23	9	17		25	
04	Lithuania	7	10	7	5	22	9	2	4	7
05	Austria	4	3	3	4	1	3	8	10	1
06	Estonia	1	2	5	6	2	2	10	5	6
07	Norway	15	14	12	16	17	16		12	
08	Portugal	22	20	19	22	23	24		26	
09	United Kingdom	14	13	20	20	13	19		19	
10	Serbia	26	19	21	21	14	22		21	
11	Germany	2	1	4	14	3	4	7	13	
12	Albania	9	9	8	11	4	7	4	23	
13	France	18	8	16	12	21	14		7	4
14	Czech Republic	20	12	26	13	25	21		11	
15	Denmark	10	21	11	2	16	10	1	9	2
16	Australia	21	15	22	19	20	23		22	
17	Finland	11	17	23	26	12	18		17	
18	Bulgaria	6	6	2	10	5	5	6	16	
19	Moldova	24	26	24	24	26	26		8	3
20	Sweden	3	5	1	1	6	1	12	15	
21	Hungary	13	11	18	3	24	11		14	
22	Israel	8	7	6	7	15	8	3	1	12
23	Netherlands	5	4	9	9	11	6	5	18	
24	Ireland	12	23	13	18	8	13		20	
25	Cyprus	23	24	25	25	19	25		2	10
26	Italy	16	16	10	17	7	12		6	5
