= Latvia in the Eurovision Song Contest 2018 =

- Eurovision Song Contest 2018
- Country: Latvia
- Selection process: Supernova 2018
- Selection date: 24 February 2018

Competing entry
- Song: "Funny Girl"
- Artist: Laura Rizzotto
- Songwriters: Laura Rizzotto

Placement
- Semi-final result: Failed to qualify (12th)

Participation chronology

Latvia was represented at the Eurovision Song Contest 2018 with the song "Funny Girl" written and performed by Laura Rizzotto. The Latvian broadcaster Latvijas Televīzija (LTV) organized the national final Supernova 2018 in order to select the Latvian entry for the 2018 contest in Lisbon, Portugal. 21 songs were selected to compete in the national final, which consisted of four shows: three semi-finals and a final. In the semi-finals on 3, 10 and 17 February 2018, two entries were selected to advance from each show alongside two wildcards selected by LTV. Eight songs ultimately qualified to compete in the final on 24 February 2018 where a public televote and a four-member jury panel selected "Funny Girl" performed by Laura Rizzotto as the winner.

Latvia was drawn to compete in the second semi-final of the Eurovision Song Contest which took place on 10 May 2018. Performing during the show in position 14, "Funny Girl" was not announced among the top 10 entries of the second semi-final and therefore did not qualify to compete in the final. It was later revealed that Latvia placed twelfth out of the 18 participating countries in the semi-final with 106 points.

== Background ==
Prior to the 2018 contest, Latvia had participated in the Eurovision Song Contest eighteen times since its first entry in 2000. Latvia won the contest once in 2002 with the song "I Wanna" performed by Marie N. Following the introduction of semi-finals for the 2004, Latvia was able to qualify to compete in the final between 2005 and 2008. Between 2009 and 2014, the nation had failed to qualify to the final for six consecutive years. After managing to qualify to the final in 2015 and 2016, Latvia failed to qualify in 2017 with the song "Line" performed by Triana Park.

The Latvian national broadcaster, Latvijas Televīzija (LTV), broadcasts the event within Latvia and organises the selection process for the nation's entry. Latvia has selected their entries for the Eurovision Song Contest through a national final. Since their debut in 2000 until 2012, LTV had organised the selection show Eirodziesma. In a response to the nation's failure to qualify to the final at Eurovision since 2008, between 2013 and 2014, the competition was rebranded and retooled as Dziesma. However, after failing to produce successful entries those two years, LTV developed the Supernova national final since 2015 which produced two out of three Latvian entries that managed to qualify the nation to the final of the Eurovision Song Contest. In early December 2017, the broadcaster announced that they would organise Supernova 2018 in order to select the Latvian entry for the 2018 contest.

== Before Eurovision ==
=== Supernova 2018 ===
Supernova 2018 was the fourth edition of Supernova, the music competition that selects Latvia's entries for the Eurovision Song Contest. The competition commenced on 3 February 2018 and concluded with a final on 24 February 2018. All shows in the competition took place at the Riga Film Studio in Riga, hosted by 2016 Latvian Eurovision entrant Justs Sirmais and Dagmāra Legante and broadcast on LTV1 as well as online via the streaming platform Replay.lv and the official Supernova website supernova.lsm.lv with commentary by Toms Grēviņš and Edgars Bāliņš.

==== Format ====
The format of the competition consisted of four shows: three semi-finals and a final. LTV broadcast two introductory shows on 25 January and 1 February 2018 that covered the background preparation processes and auditions that occurred prior to the competition. The three semi-finals, held on 3, 10 and 17 February 2018, each featured seven competing entries from which two advanced to the final from each show. LTV also advanced two wildcard acts to the final from the remaining non-qualifying entries in the semi-finals. The final, held on 24 February 2018, selected the Latvian entry for Lisbon from the remaining eight entries.

Results during the semi-final and final shows were determined by the 50/50 combination of votes from a jury panel and a public vote. In the semi-finals, both the jury and public vote assigned points from 1 to 7 based on ranking, with the first place receiving one point and last place receiving seven points. In the final, both the jury and public vote assigned points from 1 to 8 also based on ranking with the first place receiving one point and last place receiving eight points. Ties were decided in favour of the entries that received higher points from the public. Viewers were able to vote via telephone or via SMS. The online vote conducted through the official Supernova website allowed users to vote once per each accepted social network account: Draugiem.lv, Facebook and Twitter. Votes conducted through Spotify were based on unique listener counts, with each stream counting as one vote for each entry.

The jury participated in each show by providing feedback to the competing artists and selecting entries to advance in the competition. The panel consisted of:

- Rūdolfs Budze–DJ Rudd – DJ and producer
- Jolanta Gulbe – jazz singer
- Jānis Lūsēns – composer

==== Competing entries ====
Artists and songwriters were able to submit their entries to the broadcaster between 6 September 2017 and 15 October 2017. 63 valid entries out of 93 were submitted at the conclusion of the submission period. The submitted songs were listed online on the official Supernova website allowing users to either select the "Like" or "Dislike" option for each entry between 18 and 29 October 2017. 152,082 votes were received and local and international jury panels appointed by LTV evaluated the submitted songs and shortlisted 33 entries, taking the results of the online vote into consideration. Auditions in front of the local jury took place on 5 November 2017 at the Alfa Park in Riga and featured the 33 shortlisted entries. The local jury panel consisted of Ilze Jansone (Supernova producer), Toms Grēviņš (radio DJ and journalist) and two members of the jury panel during the live shows: Rūdolfs Budze–DJ Rudd and Jolanta Gulbe. The twenty-one selected performers and songs were determined on 9 November 2017 and all relevant parties were informed. The twenty-one competing artists and songs were announced on 6 December 2017.

Artist	Song	Songwriter(s)
Agnese Stengrēvics	"You Are My World"	Helvijs Stengrēvics, Agnese Stengrēvics
Dvines	"More Than Meets the Eye"	Andris Strazds, Dvines
Ed Rallidae	"What I Had with You"	Aminata Savadogo
Edgars Kreilis	"Younger Days"	Edgars Kreilis
Hypnotic	"Pray"	Sabīne Geiba, Beatrise Heislere, Ruslans Kuksinovičs
In My Head	"Sunset"	Evija Smagare, Armands Varslavāns
Jenny May	"Soledad"	Maija Stuģe, Martin Karl Hägglund, Martin Björn Hanzén, Tim Erik Åström, Michael Javier Hernan Barraza Alfaro
Katrīna Gupalo and the Black Birds	"Intoxicating Caramel"	Katrīna Gupalo
Katrine Lukins	"Running Red Lights"	Katrine Lukins, Andris Lukins, Kaspars Ansons
Kris and Oz	"Morning Flight"	Artūrs Osipovs, Kristīne Morina, Kristīne Sisējeva, Aleksandrs Solovjovs
Laura Rizzotto	"Funny Girl"	Laura Rizzotto
Lauris Valters	"Lovers Bliss"	Lauris Valters
Liene Greifāne	"Walk the Talk"	Liene Greifāne, Ylva Persson, Linda Persson
Madara	"Esamība"	Madara Fogelmane
Markus Riva	"This Time"	Kaspars Ansons, Edgars Krastiņš, Quincy Thompson, Miķelis Ļaksa
Mionia	"You"	Maija Līcīte
Monta	"1000 Roses"	Monta Ķimene
Rahu the Fool	"Oh Longriver"	Pēteris Narubins, Rahu the Fool
Riga Reggae	"Stop the War U2"	Horens Stalbe, Vladimirs Eglītis, Mārtiņš Burkevics, Renarts Braufmanis
Ritvars	"Who's Counting?"	Ritvars Vulis
Sudden Lights	"Just Fine"	Andrejs Reinis Zitmanis, Kārlis Matīss Zitmanis

==== Shows ====
===== Semi-finals =====
The three semi-finals took place on 3, 10 and 17 February 2018. In each semi-final seven acts competed and the top two entries qualified to the semi-final based on the combination of votes from a jury panel and the Latvian public. On 12 February 2018, LTV announced that the song "This Time" performed by Markus Riva, which was originally announced as a non-qualifier during the second semi-final, had been awarded a wildcard to qualify to the final due to a technical failure with the online vote that led to changes in placing. On 20 February 2018, the song "Just Fine" performed by Sudden Lights was announced to have been awarded a second wildcard to qualify to the final.

A guest juror was also featured in each semi-final: member of 2017 Latvian Eurovision entrant Triana Park Agnese Rakovska for the first semi-final, member of 2013 Latvian Eurovision entrant PeR Ralfs Eilands for the second semi-final and 2010 Latvian Eurovision entrant Aija Andrejeva for the third semi-final.

Semi-final 1 – 3 February 2018
R/O	Artist	Song	Jury rank	Public vote rank	Place	Result
1	Katrīna Gupalo and the Black Birds	"Intoxicating Caramel"	5	4	5	—N/a
2	Rahu the Fool	"Oh Longriver"	6	7	6	—N/a
3	Dvines	"More Than Meets the Eye"	3	5	4	—N/a
4	Agnese Stengrevics	"You Are My World"	7	6	7	—N/a
5	Sudden Lights	"Just Fine"	4	1	3	Wildcard
6	Edgars Kreilis	"Younger Days"	2	2	2	Advanced
7	Liene Greifāne	"Walk the Talk"	1	3	1	Advanced

Semi-final 1 detailed public vote
R/O	Song	Public Vote			Rank
R/O	Song	Internet	Televote	Spotify streams	Rank
1	"Intoxicating Caramel"	222	357	24%	4
2	"Oh Longriver"	140	165	3%	7
3	"More Than Meets the Eye"	386	356	3%	5
4	"You Are My World"	260	168	16%	6
5	"Just Fine"	1,835	1,154	18%	1
6	"Younger Days"	755	550	31%	2
7	"Walk the Talk"	509	686	5%	3

Semi-final 2 – 10 February 2018
R/O	Artist	Song	Jury rank	Public vote rank	Place	Result
1	Hypnotic	"Pray"	6	5	5	—N/a
2	Madara	"Esamība"	2	2	1	Advanced
3	Markus Riva	"This Time"	3	1	2	Wildcard
4	In My Head	"Sunset"	5	7	6	—N/a
5	Ritvars	"Who's Counting?"	1	4	3	Advanced (Note: Ritvars, who was originally announced as a qualifier over Markus Riva during the second semi-final, was allowed by the Supernova organisers to compete in the final despite changes in ranking.)
6	Monta	"1000 Roses"	7	6	7	—N/a
7	Riga Reggae	"Stop the War U2"	4	3	4	—N/a

Semi-final 2 detailed public vote
R/O	Song	Public Vote		Rank
R/O	Song	Televote	Spotify streams	Rank
1	"Pray"	167	12%	5
2	"Esamība"	613	25%	2
3	"This Time"	685	18%	1
4	"Sunset"	117	11%	7
5	"Who's Counting?"	319	10%	4
6	"1000 Roses"	153	11%	6
7	"Stop the War U2"	423	13%	3

Semi-final 3 – 17 February 2018
R/O	Artist	Song	Jury rank	Public vote rank	Place	Result
1	Jenny May	"Soledad"	7	6	7	—N/a
2	Ed Rallidae	"What I Had with You"	5	3	4	—N/a
3	Katrine Lukins	"Running Red Lights"	6	5	6	—N/a
4	Lauris Valters	"Lovers Bliss"	2	4	2	Advanced
5	Mionia	"You"	3	7	5	—N/a
6	Kris and Oz	"Morning Flight"	4	2	3	—N/a
7	Laura Rizzotto	"Funny Girl"	1	1	1	Advanced

Semi-final 3 – detailed public vote
R/O	Song	Public Vote			Rank
R/O	Song	Internet	Televote	Spotify streams	Rank
1	"Soledad"	227	211	12%	6
2	"What I Had with You"	323	211	17%	3
3	"Running Red Lights"	244	96	16%	5
4	"Lovers Bliss"	369	254	12%	4
5	"You"	141	145	14%	7
6	"Morning Flight"	463	316	14%	2
7	"Funny Girl"	2,536	1,234	15%	1

===== Final =====
The final took place on 24 February 2018. Commercial Director of Universal Music Group Finland and the Baltics Petri Mannonen was a guest juror for the final. The eight entries that qualified from the semi-finals competed. The song with the highest number of votes based on the combination of votes from a jury panel and the Latvian public, "Funny Girl" performed by Laura Rizzotto, was declared the winner. In addition to the performances of the competing entries, the show featured guest performances by Dagmāra Legante, the band Instrumenti, 2000 Latvian Eurovision entrants Brainstorm, 2009 Latvian Eurovision entrant Intars Busulis, member of 2013 Latvian Eurovision entrant PeR Ralfs Eilands and 2016 Latvian Eurovision entrant Justs.

Final – 24 February 2018
R/O	Artist	Song	Jury rank	Public vote rank	Place
1	Sudden Lights	"Just Fine"	2	2	2
2	Ritvars	"Who's Counting?"	4	6	4
3	Madara	"Esamība"	3	4	3
4	Liene Greifane	"Walk the Talk"	8	5	7
5	Lauris Valters	"Lovers Bliss"	6	8	8
6	Edgars Kreilis	"Younger Days"	5	7	6
7	Laura Rizzotto	"Funny Girl"	1	1	1
8	Markus Riva	"This Time"	7	3	5

R/O	Song	Public Vote			Rank
R/O	Song	Internet	Televote	Spotify streams	Rank
1	"Just Fine"	2,357	1,563	28%	2
2	"Who's Counting?"	490	488	11%	6
3	"Esamība"	2,785	1,490	18%	4
4	"Walk the Talk"	800	398	7%	5
5	"Lovers Bliss"	366	285	5%	8
6	"Younger Days"	781	413	9%	7
7	"Funny Girl"	5,172	2,956	12%	1
8	"This Time"	2,839	2,321	10%	3

==== Ratings ====
Viewing figures by show
Show	Date	Viewing figures		Ref.
Show	Date	Nominal	Share	Ref.
Final	24 February 2018	130,900	6.9%	

=== Promotion ===
Laura Rizzotto made several appearances across Europe to specifically promote "Funny Girl" as the Latvian Eurovision entry. Between 8 and 11 April, Laura Rizzotto took part in promotional activities in Tel Aviv, Israel and performed during the Israel Calling event held at the Rabin Square. On 21 April, Laura Rizzotto performed during the ESPreParty event which was held at the Sala La Riviera venue in Madrid, Spain and hosted by Soraya Arnelas. In addition to her international appearances, on 24 March, Laura Rizzotto performed during the Eurovision PreParty Riga, which was organised by OGAE Latvia and held at the Crystal Club Concert Hall in Riga.

== At Eurovision ==
According to Eurovision rules, all nations with the exceptions of the host country and the "Big Five" (France, Germany, Italy, Spain and the United Kingdom) are required to qualify from one of two semi-finals in order to compete for the final; the top ten countries from each semi-final progress to the final. The European Broadcasting Union (EBU) split up the competing countries into six different pots based on voting patterns from previous contests, with countries with favourable voting histories put into the same pot. On 29 January 2018, a special allocation draw was held which placed each country into one of the two semi-finals, as well as which half of the show they would perform in. Latvia was placed into the second semi-final, to be held on 10 May 2018, and was scheduled to perform in the second half of the show.

Once all the competing songs for the 2018 contest had been released, the running order for the semi-finals was decided by the shows' producers rather than through another draw, so that similar songs were not placed next to each other. Latvia was set to perform in position 14, following the entry from Hungary and before the entry from Sweden.

The two semi-finals and the final were broadcast in Latvia on LTV1 with all shows featuring commentary by Toms Grēviņš who was joined by Magnuss Eriņš for the final. The Latvian spokesperson, who announced the top 12-point score awarded by the Latvian jury during the final, was Dagmāra Legante.

=== Semi-final ===
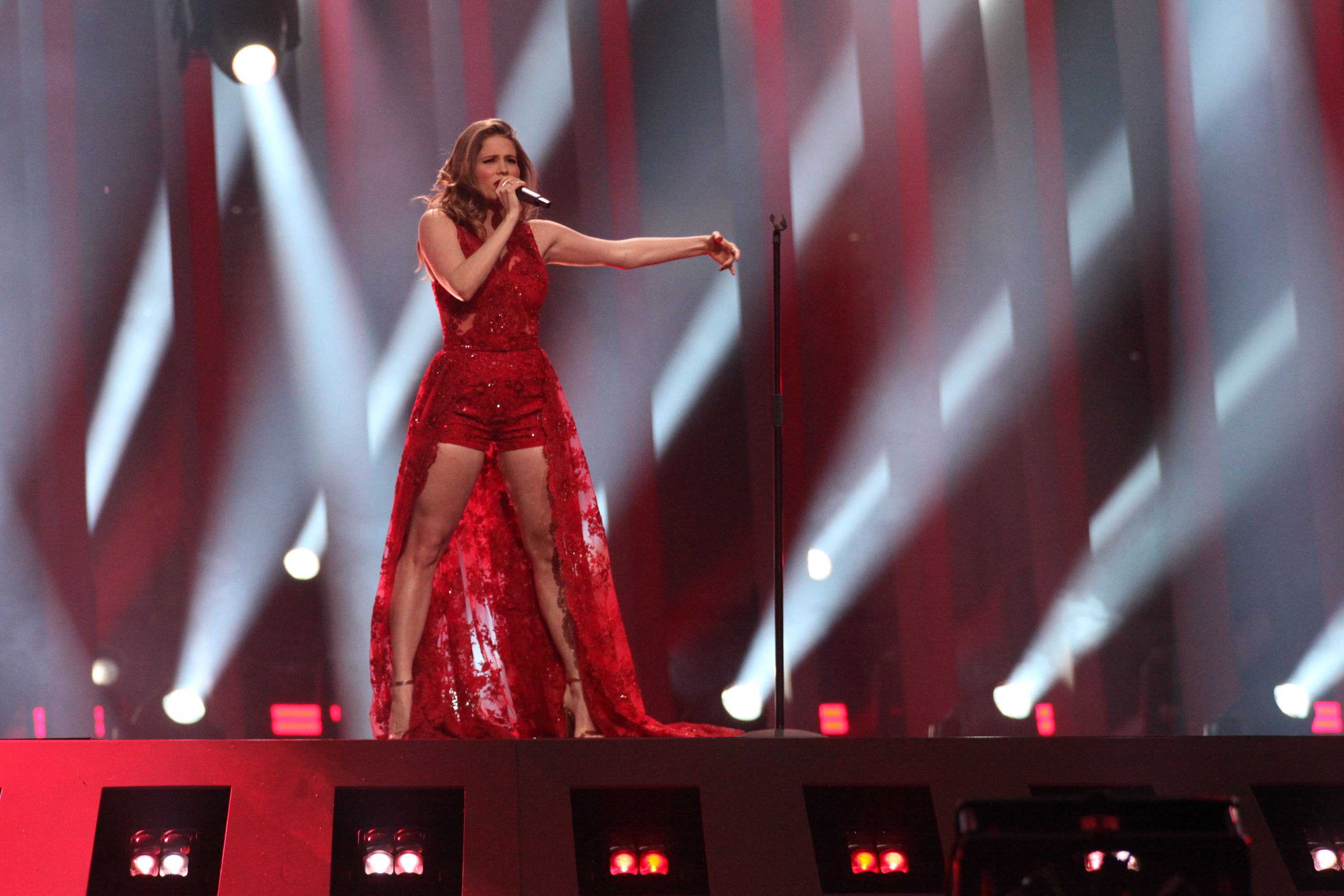
Laura Rizzotto during a rehearsal before the second semi-final

Laura Rizzotto took part in technical rehearsals on 2 and 5 May, followed by dress rehearsals on 9 and 10 May. This included the jury show on 9 May where the professional juries of each country watched and voted on the competing entries.

The Latvian performance featured Laura Rizzotto performing alone on stage wearing a red lace jumpsuit with a train attached. The stage lighting transitioned from red to yellow accompanied by white spotlights with the light rig being set in a lowered position. In regards to the performance, the singer stated: "'Funny Girl' is a song that is introspective. It's about a girl who has been keeping a secret and now has decided to share it with the world. It's an emotional journey. My outfit represents passion, drama and confidence, and I like the way it makes me feel." Laura Rizzotto was joined by four backing vocalists: Antra Kūmiņa, Edgars Zvirbulis, Iluta Alsberga and Kristīne Pastare.

At the end of the show, Latvia was not announced among the top 10 entries in the second semi-final and therefore failed to qualify to compete in the final. It was later revealed that Latvia placed twelfth in the semi-final, receiving a total of 106 points: 14 points from the televoting and 92 points from the juries.

=== Voting ===
Voting during the three shows involved each country awarding two sets of points from 1–8, 10 and 12: one from their professional jury and the other from televoting. Each nation's jury consisted of five music industry professionals who are citizens of the country they represent, with their names published before the contest to ensure transparency. This jury judged each entry based on: vocal capacity; the stage performance; the song's composition and originality; and the overall impression by the act. In addition, no member of a national jury was permitted to be related in any way to any of the competing acts in such a way that they cannot vote impartially and independently. The individual rankings of each jury member as well as the nation's televoting results were released shortly after the grand final.

Below is a breakdown of points awarded to Latvia and awarded by Latvia in the second semi-final and grand final of the contest, and the breakdown of the jury voting and televoting conducted during the two shows:

==== Points awarded to Latvia ====
Points awarded to Latvia (Semi-final 2)
Score	Televote	Jury
12 points		
10 points		France; Germany; Ukraine
8 points		Georgia
7 points	Georgia	Denmark; Netherlands; Norway; Poland; Sweden
6 points		
5 points		Australia; San Marino
4 points	Poland	
3 points		Moldova; Serbia
2 points	Denmark	Hungary
1 point	Ukraine	Romania

==== Points awarded by Latvia ====
Points awarded by Latvia (Semi-final 2)
Score	Televote	Jury
12 points	Russia	Australia
10 points	Ukraine	Sweden
8 points	Moldova	Netherlands
7 points	Denmark	Malta
6 points	Sweden	Moldova
5 points	Georgia	Norway
4 points	Norway	Slovenia
3 points	Hungary	Romania
2 points	Australia	Georgia
1 point	Netherlands	Ukraine

Points awarded by Latvia (Final)
Score	Televote	Jury
12 points	Lithuania	Sweden
10 points	Estonia	France
8 points	Israel	Estonia
7 points	Moldova	Austria
6 points	Italy	Australia
5 points	Denmark	Netherlands
4 points	Czech Republic	Lithuania
3 points	Ukraine	Germany
2 points	Norway	United Kingdom
1 point	Cyprus	Slovenia

==== Detailed voting results ====
The following members comprised the Latvian jury:

- Valters Pūce (jury chairperson) – composer, musician, producer, conductor, music educator
- Mārtiņš Makreckis (Makree) – music producer, songwriter
- Aminata Savadogo (Aminata) – singer, songwriter, music producer, model, represented Latvia in the 2015 Contest
- Annija Putniņa – singer, actress, head of musical theatre department in Riga Cathedral Choir School
- Agnese Cimuška – CEO at Music Export Latvia

Detailed voting results from Latvia (Semi-final 2)
R/O	Country	Jury							Televote	
R/O	Country	V. Pūce	Makree	Aminata	A. Putniņa	A. Cimuška	Rank	Points	Rank	Points
01	Norway	3	6	9	4	10	6	5	7	4
02	Romania	12	4	5	12	9	8	3	15	
03	Serbia	11	12	11	5	6	11		14	
04	San Marino	15	11	14	17	15	17		17	
05	Denmark	13	13	17	13	11	16		4	7
06	Russia	16	14	4	15	17	12		1	12
07	Moldova	7	7	7	7	2	5	6	3	8
08	Netherlands	1	3	2	6	12	3	8	10	1
09	Australia	4	2	3	2	3	1	12	9	2
10	Georgia	6	5	16	9	8	9	2	6	5
11	Poland	14	17	13	8	7	13		12	
12	Malta	2	8	10	1	13	4	7	13	
13	Hungary	9	15	8	11	16	14		8	3
14	Latvia									
15	Sweden	17	1	1	10	1	2	10	5	6
16	Montenegro	8	9	15	16	14	15		16	
17	Slovenia	5	16	12	3	4	7	4	11	
18	Ukraine	10	10	6	14	5	10	1	2	10

Detailed voting results from Latvia (Final)
R/O	Country	Jury							Televote	
R/O	Country	V. Pūce	Makree	Aminata	A. Putniņa	A. Cimuška	Rank	Points	Rank	Points
01	Ukraine	18	10	12	18	12	18		8	3
02	Spain	26	14	25	16	15	23		25	
03	Slovenia	14	26	24	1	13	10	1	22	
04	Lithuania	3	6	16	8	6	7	4	1	12
05	Austria	13	3	2	10	8	4	7	19	
06	Estonia	1	8	8	12	5	3	8	2	10
07	Norway	5	16	13	5	21	11		9	2
08	Portugal	24	7	10	26	22	17		26	
09	United Kingdom	6	25	26	2	26	9	2	18	
10	Serbia	12	18	11	9	14	15		23	
11	Germany	11	4	5	14	7	8	3	17	
12	Albania	10	22	20	17	24	22		24	
13	France	22	1	7	11	3	2	10	16	
14	Czech Republic	23	17	17	25	2	13		7	4
15	Denmark	17	21	22	13	19	24		6	5
16	Australia	7	9	6	4	4	5	6	13	
17	Finland	19	19	14	24	20	26		21	
18	Bulgaria	8	15	4	19	25	14		20	
19	Moldova	20	20	15	6	18	16		4	7
20	Sweden	4	2	1	3	1	1	12	11	
21	Hungary	15	24	9	20	23	20		12	
22	Israel	2	23	18	21	10	12		3	8
23	Netherlands	9	5	3	7	9	6	5	15	
24	Ireland	21	11	21	15	17	21		14	
25	Cyprus	16	12	19	22	11	19		10	1
26	Italy	25	13	23	23	16	25		5	6
