= Malta in the Eurovision Song Contest 2018 =

- Eurovision Song Contest 2018
- Participating broadcaster: Public Broadcasting Services (PBS)
- Country: Malta
- Selection process: Malta Eurovision Song Contest 2018
- Selection date: 3 February 2018

Competing entry
- Song: "Taboo"
- Artist: Christabelle
- Songwriters: Johnny Sanchez; Thomas G:son; Christabelle Borg; Muxu

Placement
- Semi-final result: Failed to qualify (13th)

Participation chronology

Malta was represented at the Eurovision Song Contest 2018 with the song "Taboo", written by Johnny Sanchez, Thomas G:son, Christabelle Borg, and Muxu, and performed by Christabelle. The Maltese participating broadcaster, Public Broadcasting Services (PBS), selected its entry for the contest through the national final Malta Eurovision Song Contest 2018. The competition consisted of a final held on 3 February 2018, where "Taboo" performed by Christabelle eventually emerged as the winning entry after scoring the most points from a five-member jury and a public televote.

Malta was drawn to compete in the second semi-final of the Eurovision Song Contest which took place on 10 May 2018. Performing during the show in position 12, "Taboo" was not announced among the top 10 entries of the second semi-final and therefore did not qualify to compete in the final on 12 May. It was later revealed that Malta placed thirteenth out of the 18 participating countries in the semi-final with 101 points.

== Background ==
Prior to the 2018 contest, the Maltese Broadcasting Authority (MBA) until 1975, and the Public Broadcasting Services (PBS) since 1991, have participated in the Eurovision Song Contest representing Malta thirty times since MBA's first entry in 1971. MBA briefly competed in the contest in the 1970s before withdrawing for sixteen years, while PBS competed in every contest since their return in 1991. Their best placing in the contest thus far was second, achieved on two occasions: in 2002 with the song "7th Wonder" performed by Ira Losco and in the 2005 contest with the song "Angel" performed by Chiara.

As part of its duties as participating broadcaster, PBS organises the selection of its entry in the Eurovision Song Contest and broadcasts the event in the country. The broadcaster selected its entry consistently through a national final procedure, a method that was continued for its 2018 participation.

== Before Eurovision ==
=== Malta Eurovision Song Contest 2018 ===
Malta Eurovision Song Contest 2018 was the national final format developed by PBS to select its entry for the Eurovision Song Contest 2018. The competition consisted of a final held on 3 February 2018 at the Malta Fairs and Conventions Centre in Ta' Qali, hosted by Colin Fitz and broadcast on Television Malta (TVM) as well as on the broadcaster's website tvm.com.mt.

==== Competing entries ====
Artists and composers were able to submit their entries between 30 June 2017 and 1 September 2017. Songwriters from any nationality were able to submit songs as long as the artist were Maltese or possessed Maltese citizenship. Artists were able to submit as many songs as they wished, however, they could only compete with a maximum of one in the final. 2017 national final winner Claudia Faniello was unable to compete due to a rule that prevented the previous winner from competing in the following competition. 129 entries were received by the broadcaster. On 15 September 2017, PBS announced a shortlist of 30 entries that had progressed through the selection process. The sixteen songs selected to compete in the final were announced on 11 October 2017. Among the selected competing artists was former Maltese Eurovision entrant Richard Micallef who represented Malta in 2014 as member of the group Firelight.

Artist	Song	Songwriter(s)
Aidan	"Dai Laga"	Aidan Cassar
Avenue Sky	"We Can Run"	Jonas Gladnikoff, Matthew Ker, Glen Vella
Brooke	"Heart of Gold"	Borislav Milanov, Dag Lundberg, Niklas Lif, Brooke Borg
Christabelle	"Taboo"	Johnny Sanchez, Thomas G:son, Christabelle Borg, Matthew Mercieca
Danica Muscat	"One Step at a Time"	John Ballard, Ruth Mussie, Jerusalem Yemane, Irena Krstva, Kian Fakhary
Deborah C	"Turn It Up"	Christian Schneider, Aidan O'Connor, Sara Biglert, Erik Grönwall
Dwett	"Breaking Point"	Elton Zarb, Matthew Mercieca
Eleanor Cassar	"Back to Life"	Jonas Gladnikoff, Michael James Down
Jasmine Abela	"Supernovas"	Charlie Mason, Jonas Thander
Lawrence Gray	"Love Renegade"	Cyprian Cassar, Matthew Mercieca
Matthew Anthony	"Call 2morrow"	Jonas Gladnikoff, Tom Wiklund, Peder Eriksson
Miriana Conte	"Rocket"	Cyprian Cassar, Matthew Mercieca
Petra	"Evolution"	Elton Zarb, Matthew Mercieca
Rhiannon	"Beyond Blue Horizons"	Rhiannon Micallef, Cyprian Cassar
Richard and Joe Micallef	"Song for Dad"	Cyprian Cassar, Richard Micallef
Tiziana Calleja	"First Time"	Tina Stenberg

==== Final ====
The final took place on 3 February 2018. Sixteen entries competed and the 50/50 combination of votes of a five-member jury panel and the results of public televoting determined the winner. The show was opened with a guest performance of "Breathlessly" performed by 2017 Maltese Eurovision entrant Claudia Faniello, while the interval act featured further performances by Faniello as well as performances by 2017 Maltese Junior Eurovision entrant Gianluca Cilla, the Analise Dance Studio and the Kinetic Dance Studio. After the votes from the jury panel and televote were combined, "Taboo" performed by Christabelle was the winner. Each point awarded by the public televote equated to approximately 37 votes. The five members of the jury that evaluated the entries during the final consisted of:

- Regína Ósk (Iceland) – Singer, represented Iceland in 2008 as member of the group Euroband
- Jan Bors (Czech Republic) – Head of Delegation for Czech Republic in the Eurovision Song Contest
- Kleart Duraj (Albania) – Head of Delegation for Albania in the Eurovision Song Contest
- Meri Popova (Macedonia) – Head of Delegation for Macedonia in the Eurovision Song Contest
- Bruno Santori (Italy) – Conductor

Final – 3 February 2018
R/O	Artist	Song	Jury	Televote	Total	Place
1	Aidan	"Dai Laga"	34	8	42	4
2	Miriana Conte	"Rocket"	9	5	14	12
3	Jasmine Abela	"Supernovas"	25	6	31	8
4	Matthew Anthony	"Call 2morrow"	26	6	32	7
5	Danica Muscat	"One Step at a Time"	2	1	3	16
6	Dwett	"Breaking Point"	3	12	15	10
7	Lawrence Gray	"Love Renegade"	3	4	7	15
8	Richard and Joe Micallef	"Song for Dad"	31	67	98	2
9	Tiziana Calleja	"First Time"	4	8	12	14
10	Eleanor Cassar	"Back to Life"	19	17	36	5
11	Rhiannon	"Beyond Blue Horizons"	9	5	14	11
12	Brooke	"Heart of Gold"	37	47	84	3
13	Christabelle	"Taboo"	60	73	133	1
14 (Note: Due to technical difficulties in the performance, Deborah C was allowed to perform again following Petra performing "Evolution".)	Deborah C	"Turn It Up"	0	13	13	13
15	Avenue Sky	"We Can Run"	1	15	16	9
16	Petra	"Evolution"	27	6	33	6

Detailed Jury Votes
R/O	Song	R. Ósk	J. Bors	K. Duraj	M. Popova	B. Santori	Total
1	"Dai Laga"	10	8	6	3	7	34
2	"Rocket"	4		5			9
3	"Supernovas"	8	10	2	5		25
4	"Call 2morrow"	3	5	4	6	8	26
5	"One Step at a Time"					2	2
6	"Breaking Point"		2		1		3
7	"Love Renegade"					3	3
8	"Song for Dad"	5	4	10	7	5	31
9	"First Time"					4	4
10	"Back to Life"	2	1	7	8	1	19
11	"Beyond Blue Horizons"	1	6		2		9
12	"Heart of Gold"	6	3	8	10	10	37
13	"Taboo"	12	12	12	12	12	60
14	"Turn It Up"						0
15	"We Can Run"			1			1
16	"Evolution"	7	7	3	4	6	27

== At Eurovision ==
The Eurovision Song Contest 2018 took place at the Lisbon Arena in Lisbon, Portugal and consisted of two semi-finals on 8 and 10 May, and the final of 12 May 2018. According to Eurovision rules, all nations with the exceptions of the host country and the "Big Five" (France, Germany, Italy, Spain and the United Kingdom) are required to qualify from one of two semi-finals in order to compete for the final; the top ten countries from each semi-final progress to the final. The European Broadcasting Union (EBU) split up the competing countries into six different pots based on voting patterns from previous contests, with countries with favourable voting histories put into the same pot. On 29 January 2018, an allocation draw was held which placed each country into one of the two semi-finals, as well as which half of the show they would perform in. Malta was placed into the second semi-final, to be held on 10 May 2018, and was scheduled to perform in the second half of the show.

Once all the competing songs for the 2018 contest had been released, the running order for the semi-finals was decided by the shows' producers rather than through another draw, so that similar songs were not placed next to each other. Malta was set to perform in position 12, following the entry from Poland and before the entry from Hungary.

The two semi-finals and the final were broadcast in Malta on TVM. The Maltese spokesperson, who announced the top 12 points awarded by the Maltese jury during the final, was Lara Azzopardi.

=== Semi-final ===
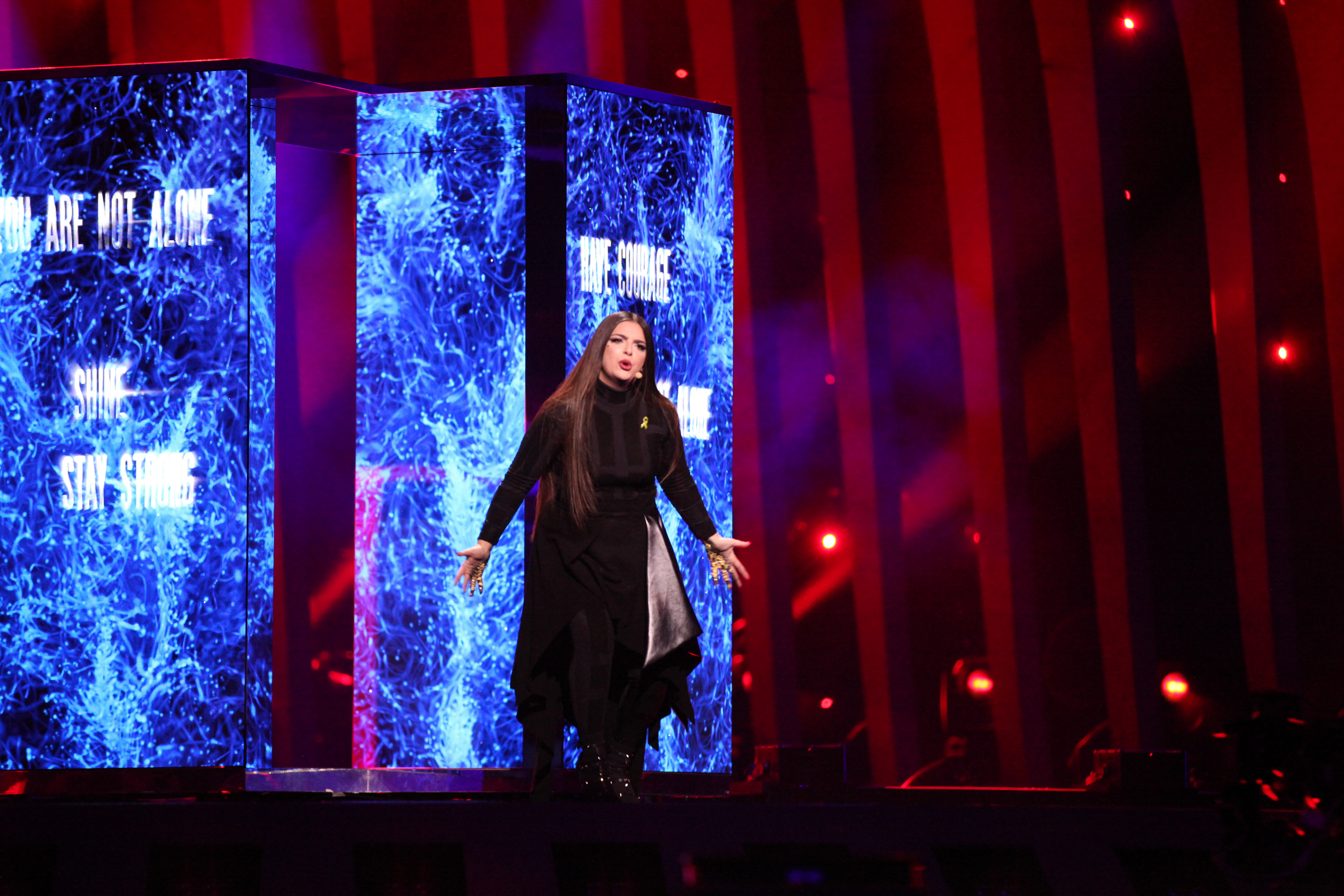
Christabelle during a rehearsal before the second semi-final

Christabelle took part in technical rehearsals on 1 and 4 May, followed by dress rehearsals on 9 and 10 May. This included the jury show on 9 May where the professional juries of each country watched and voted on the competing entries.

The Maltese performance featured Christabelle wearing a tight black long sleeved turtle neck and a black leather skirt with an uneven hemline, and performing together with one dancer. The performance began with Christabelle standing in the centre of a cube prop with four diagonal double-sided screens, displaying videos of people in a box, with an augmented reality heart appearing over her chest and a globe image appearing during the first verse. In the second verse, Christabelle came out of the cube for the dancer to take her place for the remainder of the performance. The performance also utilised lasers and pyrotechnics. Christabelle was joined by four off-stage backing vocalists: Anna Azzopardi, Josef Tabone, Pamela Bezzina and Petra Zammit. The dancer featured during the performance was Anthea Zammit who previously represented Malta at the Eurovision Young Dancers 2015.

At the end of the show, Malta was not announced among the top 10 entries in the first semi-final and therefore failed to qualify to compete in the final. It was later revealed that Malta placed thirteenth in the semi-final, receiving a total of 101 points: 8 points from the televoting and 93 points from the juries.

=== Voting ===
Voting during the three shows involved each country awarding two sets of points from 1-8, 10 and 12: one from their professional jury and the other from televoting. Each nation's jury consisted of five music industry professionals who are citizens of the country they represent, with their names published before the contest to ensure transparency. This jury judged each entry based on: vocal capacity; the stage performance; the song's composition and originality; and the overall impression by the act. In addition, no member of a national jury was permitted to be related in any way to any of the competing acts in such a way that they cannot vote impartially and independently. The individual rankings of each jury member as well as the nation's televoting results were released shortly after the grand final.

Below is a breakdown of points awarded to Malta and awarded by Malta in the second semi-final and grand final of the contest, and the breakdown of the jury voting and televoting conducted during the two shows:

==== Points awarded to Malta ====
Points awarded to Malta (Semi-final 2)
Score	Televote	Jury
12 points		
10 points		Romania
8 points		Denmark; Italy; San Marino; Slovenia
7 points	Australia	Latvia; Montenegro
6 points		France; Germany; Norway
5 points		
4 points		Georgia; Serbia; Sweden
3 points		Australia
2 points		Moldova
1 point	Denmark	Netherlands; Poland

==== Points awarded by Malta ====
Points awarded by Malta (Semi-final 2)
Score	Televote	Jury
12 points	San Marino	Norway
10 points	Australia	Sweden
8 points	Denmark	Denmark
7 points	Sweden	Australia
6 points	Norway	Ukraine
5 points	Netherlands	Montenegro
4 points	Moldova	Moldova
3 points	Russia	San Marino
2 points	Ukraine	Romania
1 point	Poland	Serbia

Points awarded by Malta (Final)
Score	Televote	Jury
12 points	Italy	Cyprus
10 points	Cyprus	Italy
8 points	Israel	France
7 points	Bulgaria	Sweden
6 points	Australia	Israel
5 points	Lithuania	Czech Republic
4 points	Germany	Norway
3 points	Czech Republic	Australia
2 points	Denmark	Bulgaria
1 point	United Kingdom	Austria

==== Detailed voting results ====
The following members comprised the Maltese jury:

- Elton Zarb (jury chairperson) – composer, musician, producer
- Dorian Cassar – radio and TV presenter, business owner
- Olwyn Jo Saliba – producer, video editor
- Alexander Kitcher – event coordinator, technical director at Valletta 2018 Foundation
- Amber Bondin – music artist, represented Malta in the 2015 contest

Detailed voting results from Malta (Semi-final 2)
R/O	Country	Jury							Televote	
R/O	Country	D. Cassar	O.J. Saliba	A. Kitcher	A. Bondin	E. Zarb	Rank	Points	Rank	Points
01	Norway	1	1	2	2	4	1	12	5	6
02	Romania	8	11	7	8	13	9	2	14	
03	Serbia	14	15	9	7	17	10	1	15	
04	San Marino	13	7	10	5	7	8	3	1	12
05	Denmark	2	2	5	4	6	3	8	3	8
06	Russia	17	17	8	13	11	16		8	3
07	Moldova	6	16	6	14	3	7	4	7	4
08	Netherlands	9	13	12	16	10	11		6	5
09	Australia	7	4	3	6	1	4	7	2	10
10	Georgia	16	8	11	15	14	14		17	
11	Poland	10	14	17	10	12	15		10	1
12	Malta									
13	Hungary	11	12	15	17	8	13		11	
14	Latvia	12	10	14	9	16	12		13	
15	Sweden	3	6	1	3	2	2	10	4	7
16	Montenegro	4	3	4	11	9	6	5	16	
17	Slovenia	15	9	16	12	15	17		12	
18	Ukraine	5	5	13	1	5	5	6	9	2

Detailed voting results from Malta (Final)
R/O	Country	Jury							Televote	
R/O	Country	D. Cassar	O.J. Saliba	A. Kitcher	A. Bondin	E. Zarb	Rank	Points	Rank	Points
01	Ukraine	13	22	16	11	26	17		21	
02	Spain	21	24	14	19	18	21		25	
03	Slovenia	23	23	18	20	19	23		24	
04	Lithuania	12	13	11	12	11	13		6	5
05	Austria	18	9	12	9	8	10	1	15	
06	Estonia	19	21	19	15	25	22		14	
07	Norway	6	8	7	6	7	7	4	17	
08	Portugal	26	25	17	22	20	24		26	
09	United Kingdom	22	16	9	18	16	16		10	1
10	Serbia	25	19	20	26	23	26		19	
11	Germany	10	11	15	10	15	12		7	4
12	Albania	24	18	4	21	22	11		18	
13	France	3	3	3	3	3	3	8	13	
14	Czech Republic	4	7	5	7	6	6	5	8	3
15	Denmark	11	12	26	13	24	15		9	2
16	Australia	9	10	10	8	9	8	3	5	6
17	Finland	14	17	21	25	13	18		16	
18	Bulgaria	20	4	23	14	10	9	2	4	7
19	Moldova	15	15	24	24	17	20		22	
20	Sweden	5	5	6	5	5	4	7	12	
21	Hungary	17	26	25	23	21	25		23	
22	Israel	7	6	8	4	4	5	6	3	8
23	Netherlands	16	20	22	16	14	19		20	
24	Ireland	8	14	13	17	12	14		11	
25	Cyprus	2	1	2	1	1	1	12	2	10
26	Italy	1	2	1	2	2	2	10	1	12
