= Under the Ladder =

2018 song by Mélovin

Single by Mélovin

from the album Octopus
- Released: 18 January 2018
- Genre: Pop rock
- Length: 2:59
- Label: Umyh Music
- Songwriters: Mike Ryals; Kostyantyn Bocharov; Anton Karskyi
- Producers: Anton Karskyi; Yevhen Filatov

Mélovin singles chronology
"Hooligan" (2017)	"Under the Ladder" (2018)	"That's Your Role" (2018)

Music video
- "Under the Ladder" on YouTube

Eurovision Song Contest 2018 entry
- Country: Ukraine
- Artist: Mélovin
- Language: English
- Composer: Mélovin
- Lyricist: Mike Ryals

Finals performance
- Semi-final result: 6th
- Semi-final points: 179
- Final result: 17th
- Final points: 130

Entry chronology
- ◄ "Time" (2017)
- "Siren Song" (2019) ►

"Under the Ladder" is a song performed by Ukrainian singer Mélovin. The song was released as a digital download on 18 January 2018 through Umyh Music, and was written by Mélovin along with Mike Ryals and Anton Karskyi. It represented Ukraine in the Eurovision Song Contest 2018 in Lisbon, Portugal. It was included in Mélovin’s 2018 album Octopus.

== Eurovision Song Contest ==
On 16 January 2018, Mélovin was confirmed as one of the 18 competing acts in Vidbir 2018, the Ukrainian national selection for the Eurovision Song Contest 2018, with the song "Under the Ladder". He competed in the second semi-final on 17 February 2018, where he qualified to the final as one of the top three finishers, placing first with the highest number of televotes from the Ukrainian public and second-highest number of jury votes from the jury consisting of Jamala, Andriy Danylko, and Eugene Filatov. He won the final on 24 February and represented Ukraine in the Eurovision Song Contest 2018.

The song competed in the second semi-final, held on 10 May 2018 in Lisbon, Portugal. It qualified for the final, finishing in 6th place, and finished in 17th place in the final, getting seventh place with the public (119 points), but last place with the juries (11 points). This was one of the lowest placement of Ukraine at the Eurovision Song Contest in history.

== Track listing ==
Digital download
No.	Title	Length
1.	"Under the Ladder"	2:59

== Charts ==
Chart (2018)	Peak position
Ukraine Weekly (Tophit)	54
Sweden Heatseeker (Sverigetopplistan)	9

== Release history ==
Region	Date	Format	Label
Various	18 January 2018	Digital download	Umyh Music
