= Ukraine in the Eurovision Song Contest 2018 =

- Eurovision Song Contest 2018
- Participating broadcaster: Public Broadcasting Company of Ukraine (UA:PBC)
- Country: Ukraine
- Selection process: Vidbir 2018
- Selection date: 24 February 2018

Competing entry
- Song: "Under the Ladder"
- Artist: Mélovin
- Songwriters: Mike Ryals; Kostyantyn Bocharov; Anton Karskyi

Placement
- Semi-final result: Qualified (6th, 179 points)
- Final result: 17th, 130 points

Participation chronology

Ukraine was represented at the Eurovision Song Contest 2018 with the song "Under the Ladder", performed by Mélovin and written by Mélovin along with Mike Ryals and Anton Karskyi. The Ukrainian broadcaster Public Broadcasting Company of Ukraine (UA:PBC) organised a national final in collaboration with commercial broadcaster STB in order to select the Ukrainian entry for the 2018 contest in Lisbon, Portugal. The national selection consisted of two semi-finals, held on 10 and 17 February 2018, and a final, held on 24 February 2018; nine entries competed in each semi-final with the top three from each semi-final advancing to the final. In the final, "Under the Ladder" performed by Mélovin was selected as the winner following the combination of votes from a three-member jury panel and a public televote.

Ukraine was drawn to compete in the second semi-final of the Eurovision Song Contest which took place on 10 May 2018. Performing during the show in position 18, "Under the Ladder" was announced among the top 10 entries of the second semi-final and therefore qualified to compete in the final on 12 May. It was later revealed that Ukraine placed sixth out of the 18 participating countries in the semi-final with 179 points. In the final, Ukraine performed in position 1 and placed seventeenth out of the 26 participating countries with 130 points. It is the worst position for Ukraine in a contest where it was not the host country.

== Background ==
Prior to the 2018 contest, Ukraine had participated in the Eurovision Song Contest fourteen times since its first entry in 2003, winning it in 2004 with the song "Wild Dances" performed by Ruslana and in 2016 with the song "1944" performed by Jamala. Following the introduction of semi-finals for the 2004, Ukraine had managed to qualify to final in every contest they participated in thus far. Ukraine had been the runner-up in the contest on two occasions: in 2007 with the song "Dancing Lasha Tumbai" performed by Verka Serduchka and in 2008 with the song "Shady Lady" performed by Ani Lorak. Ukraine's least successful result had been 24th place, which they achieved during the 2017, with the song "Time" performed by O.Torvald.

The Ukrainian national broadcaster, Public Broadcasting Company of Ukraine (UA:PBC), broadcasts the event within Ukraine and organises the selection process for the nation's entry. UA:PBC confirmed their intentions to participate at the 2018 Eurovision Song Contest on 23 August 2017. In the past, UA:PBC had alternated between both internal selections and national finals in order to select the Ukrainian entry. In 2016 and 2017, the broadcaster, in collaboration with commercial broadcaster STB, had set up national finals with several artists to choose both the song and performer to compete at Eurovision for Ukraine, with both the public and a panel of jury members involved in the selection. UA:PBC's collaboration with STB continued into 2018.

== Before Eurovision ==
=== Vidbir 2018 ===
Vidbir 2018 was the third edition of Vidbir which selected the Ukrainian entry for the Eurovision Song Contest 2018. The competition took place at the Palace of Culture "KPI" in Kyiv and consisted of two semi-finals held on 10 and 17 February 2018 and a final on 24 February 2018. All shows in the competition were hosted by Serhiy Prytula and broadcast on both UA:Pershyi and STB as well as online via UA:PBC and STB's Facebook and YouTube broadcasts.

==== Format ====
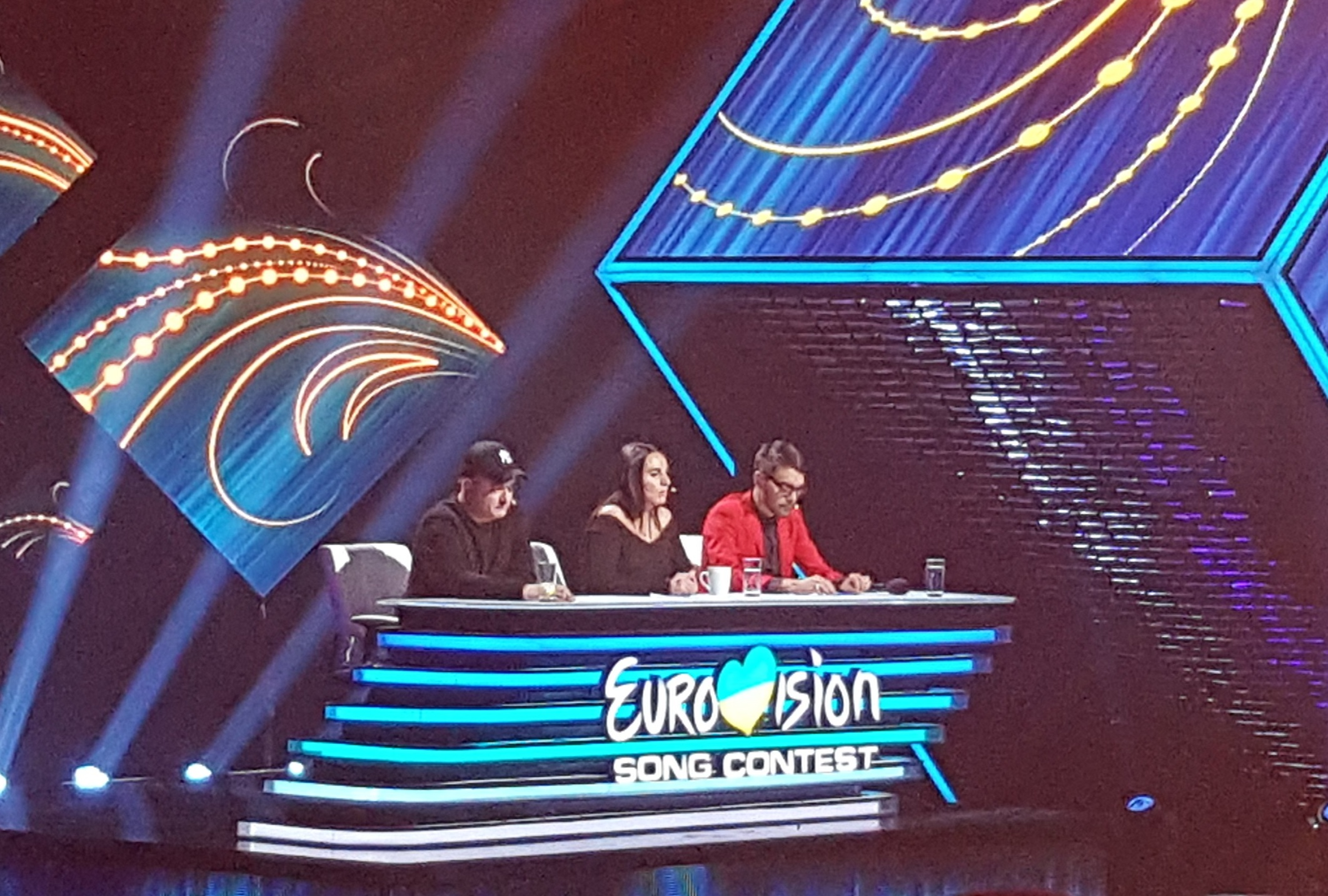
The Vidbir 2018 judges: Andriy Danylko, Jamala and Yevhen Filatov

The selection of the competing entries for the national final and ultimately the Ukrainian Eurovision entry took place over three stages. In the first stage, artists and songwriters had the opportunity to apply for the competition through an online submission form. Eighteen acts were selected and announced on 16 January 2018. The second stage consisted of the televised semi-finals which took place on 10 and 17 February 2018 with nine acts competing in each show. Three acts were selected to advance from each semi-final based on the 50/50 combination of votes from a public televote and an expert jury. Both the public televote and the expert jury assigned scores ranging from 1 (lowest) to 9 (highest) and the three entries that had the highest number of points following the combination of these scores advanced to the final. The third stage was the final, which took place on 24 February 2018 and featured the six acts that qualified from the semi-finals vying to represent Ukraine in Lisbon. The winner was selected via the 50/50 combination of votes from a public televote and an expert jury. Both the public televote and the expert jury assigned scores ranging from 1 (lowest) to 6 (highest) and the entry that had the highest number of points following the combination of these scores was declared the winner. Viewers participating in the public televote during the three live shows had the opportunity to submit a single vote per phone number for each of the participating entries via SMS or the Teleportal mobile application. In the event of a tie during the semi-finals and final, the tie was decided in favour of the entry that received the highest score from the public televote.

The jury panel that voted during the three shows consisted of:

- Andriy Danylko – comedian and singer, represented Ukraine in 2007 as the drag artist Verka Serduchka
- Jamala – singer-songwriter, winner of the Eurovision Song Contest 2016 for Ukraine
- Yevhen Filatov (The Maneken) – singer and producer, creator of group Onuka

==== Competing entries ====
Artists and composers had the opportunity to submit their entries via an online submission form which accepted entries between 10 October 2017 and 15 January 2018. Composer and producer Ruslan Kvinta was assigned as the new music producer of the show and was the lead in reviewing the received submissions and shortlisting entries to compete in the national final. On 16 January 2018, the eighteen selected competing acts were announced. The eighteen acts were allocated to one of two semi-finals during a draw that took place on 19 January, which was hosted by Ruslan Kvinta.

Artist	Song	Songwriter(s)
Constantine	"Misto" (Місто)	Kostiantyn Dmytriyev, Ulyana Kushyk
Dilemma	"Na Party" (На Party)	Yevhen Bardachenko, Nazariy Herasymchuk
The Erised	"Heroes"	Sonia Sukhorukova, Danylo Marin, Ihor Kyrylenko, Oleksander Liuliakin, Zak Ferum
Illaria	"Syla" (Сила)	Kateryna Pryshchepa
Ingret	"Save My Planet"	Ingret Kostenko, Oleksii Potapenko
Julinoza	"Hto ya?" (Хто я?)	Yulia Zaporozhets
Kadnay	"Beat of the Universe"	Dmytro Kadnay, Philipp Koliadenko
Kazka	"Dyva" (Дива)	Serhiy Yermolayev, Andriy Ihnatchenko, Serhiy Loksyn
Kozak System	"Mamai" (Мамай)	Mykola Brovchenko, Kozak System
Laud	"Waiting"	Vlad Karashchuk, Roman Cherenov, Kateryna Rohova
Mélovin	"Under the Ladder"	Mike Ryals, Kostyantyn Bocharov, Anton Karskyi
Mountain Breeze	"I See You"	Oleksandr Biliak
Pur:Pur	"Fire"	Natalia Smirina
Serhiy Babkin	"Kriz tvoyi ochi" (Крізь твої очі)	Serhiy Babkin, Yefim Chupakin, Anton Malyshev, Yevhen Filatov
Tayanna	"Lelya" (Леля)	Tetyana Reshetniak
Vilna	"Forest Song"	Iryna Vasylenko, Mykyta Reva, Yuriy Vodolazhskyi
The VYO	"Nga-Nga"	Myroslav Kuvaldin
Yurcash	"Stop Killing Love"	Yuriy Nechystiak

==== Semi-finals ====
The two semi-finals took place on 10 and 17 February 2018. In each semi-final nine acts competed and the top three entries determined following the combination of votes from a public televote and an expert jury advanced to the final of the competition, while the remaining six entries were eliminated. In addition to the performances of the competing entries, 2018 Czech Eurovision entrant Mikolas Josef performed the 2018 Czech entry "Lie to Me" as a guest in the first semi-final, while 2018 French Eurovision entrant Madame Monsieur performed the 2018 French entry "Mercy" as a guest in the second semi-final.

Semi-final 1 – 10 February 2018
R/O	Artist	Song	Jury	Televote		Total	Place
R/O	Artist	Song	Jury	Percentage	Points	Total	Place
1	Constantine	"Misto"	7	5.05%	2	9	7
2	Serhiy Babkin	"Kriz tvoyi ochi"	8	8.99%	4	12	5
3	Laud	"Waiting"	9	14.84%	7	16	1
4	Kazka	"Dyva"	4	11.42%	5	9	6
5	The Vyo	"Nga-Nga"	2	4.35%	1	3	9
6	Kozak System	"Mamai"	1	8.30%	3	4	8
7	Vilna	"Forest Song"	3	17.66%	9	12	3
8	Pur:Pur	"Fire"	6	11.91%	6	12	4
9	The Erised	"Heroes"	5	17.49%	8	13	2

Detailed Jury Votes
R/O	Song	A. Danylko	Jamala	Y. Filatov	Total	Points
1	"Misto"	5	7	9	21	7
2	"Kriz tvoyi ochi"	6	9	7	22	8
3	"Waiting"	9	8	6	23	9
4	"Dyva"	4	4	3	11	4
5	"Ng'a-Ng'a"	3	1	2	6	2
6	"Mamai"	1	3	1	5	1
7	"Forest Song"	2	2	4	8	3
8	"Fire"	7	6	8	21	6
9	"Heroes"	8	5	5	18	5

Semi-final 2 – 17 February 2018
R/O	Artist	Song	Jury	Televote		Total	Place
R/O	Artist	Song	Jury	Percentage	Points	Total	Place
1	Ingret	"Save My Planet"	2	6.96%	3	5	7
2	Mélovin	"Under the Ladder"	8	25.49%	9	17	1
3	Julinoza	"Hto ya?"	4	4.70%	1	5	8
4	Tayanna	"Lelya"	9	13.23%	7	16	2
5	Kadnay	"Beat of the Universe"	7	15.40%	8	15	3
6	Yurcash	"Stop Killing Love"	3	9.29%	5	8	6
7	Mountain Breeze	"I See You"	6	10.69%	6	12	4
8	Illaria	"Syla"	5	7.48%	4	9	5
9	Dilemma	"Na Party"	1	6.47%	2	3	9

Detailed Jury Votes
R/O	Song	A. Danylko	Jamala	Y. Filatov	Total	Points
1	"Save My Planet"	2	3	3	8	2
2	"Under the Ladder"	9	7	7	23	8
3	"Hto ya?"	4	5	4	13	4
4	"Lelya"	7	9	9	25	9
5	"Beat of the Universe"	6	8	8	22	7
6	"Stop Killing Love"	5	2	2	9	3
7	"I See You"	8	4	6	18	6
8	"Syla"	3	6	5	14	5
9	"Na Party"	1	1	1	3	1

==== Final ====
The final took place on 24 February 2018. The six entries that qualified from the semi-finals competed. The winner, "Under the Ladder" performed by Mélovin, was selected through the combination of votes from a public televote and an expert jury. Ties were decided in favour of the entries that received higher scores from the public televote. 179,455 votes were registered by the televote during the show. In addition to the performances of the competing entries, jury member Jamala performed the song "Kryla" as a guest.

Final – 24 February 2018
R/O	Artist	Song	Jury	Televote		Total	Place
R/O	Artist	Song	Jury	Votes	Points	Total	Place
1	Kadnay	"Beat of the Universe"	3	33,392	5	8	3
2	Tayanna	"Lelya"	6	29,830	4	10	2
3	The Erised	"Heroes"	2	11,628	1	3	6
4	Laud	"Waiting"	4	20,744	2	6	4
5	Vilna	"Forest Song"	1	23,192	3	4	5
6	Mélovin	"Under the Ladder"	5	60,669	6	11	1

Detailed Jury Votes
R/O	Song	A. Danylko	Jamala	Y. Filatov	Total	Points
1	"Beat of the Universe"	3	2	6	11	3
2	"Lelya"	5	6	5	16	6
3	"Heroes"	1	3	2	6	2
4	"Waiting"	4	5	3	12	4
5	"Forest Song"	2	1	1	4	1
6	"Under the Ladder"	6	4	4	14	5

=== Promotion ===
Mélovin specifically promoted "Under the Ladder" as the Ukrainian Eurovision entry on 14 April 2018 by performing during the Eurovision in Concert event which was held at the AFAS Live venue in Amsterdam, Netherlands and hosted by Edsilia Rombley and Cornald Maas.

== At Eurovision ==
According to Eurovision rules, all nations with the exceptions of the host country and the "Big Five" (France, Germany, Italy, Spain and the United Kingdom) are required to qualify from one of two semi-finals in order to compete for the final; the top ten countries from each semi-final progress to the final. The European Broadcasting Union (EBU) split up the competing countries into six different pots based on voting patterns from previous contests, with countries with favourable voting histories put into the same pot. On 29 January 2018, a special allocation draw was held which placed each country into one of the two semi-finals, as well as which half of the show they would perform in. Ukraine was placed into the second semi-final, to be held on 10 May 2018, and was scheduled to perform in the second half of the show.

Once all the competing songs for the 2018 contest had been released, the running order for the semi-finals was decided by the shows' producers rather than through another draw, so that similar songs were not placed next to each other. Ukraine was set to perform last in position 18, following the entry from Slovenia.

In Ukraine, both the semi-finals and the final were broadcast on UA:Pershyi. All shows featured commentary by Timur Miroshnychenko who was joined by 2014 Ukrainian representative Mariya Yaremchuk in the first semi-final, 2010 Ukrainian representative Alyosha in the second semi-final, and Ukrainian Eurovision 2016 winner Jamala in the final. The Ukrainian spokesperson, who announced the top 12-point score awarded by the Ukrainian jury during the final, was Natalia Zhyzhchenko.

=== Semi-final ===
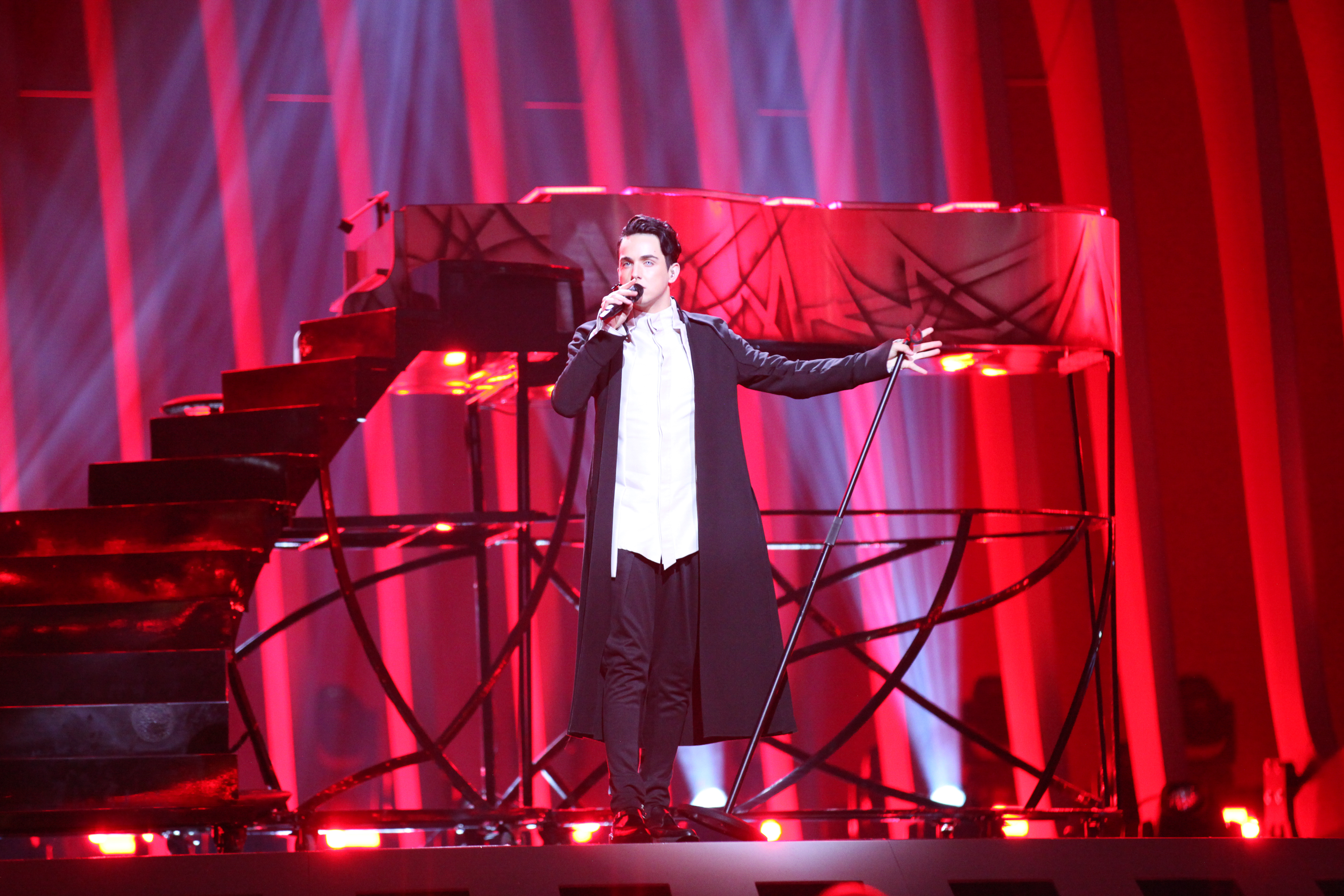
Mélovin during a rehearsal before the second semi-final

Mélovin took part in technical rehearsals on 2 and 5 May, followed by dress rehearsals on 9 and 10 May. This included the jury show on 9 May where the professional juries of each country watched and voted on the competing entries.

The Ukrainian performance featured Mélovin performing on stage in a black jacket and white shirt together with four backing vocalists. The performance began with a two-level red lit-up piano being opened up with Mélovin, who was buried inside, lifted up by the contraption within the piano. During the second verse, Mélovin walked down the stairs to the centre stage where he took his jacket off and went back up to the top of the podium to play the piano while the stairs were set on fire at the end of the performance. The stage directors and choreographers for the Ukrainian performance were Kostiantyn Tomilchenko and Oleksandr Bratkovskyi. The four backing vocalists that joined Mélovin on stage were Dasha Ptashnik, Denis Nadyozhin, Konstantin Sologub and Luiza Kazaryan.

At the end of the show, Ukraine was announced as having finished in the top 10 and subsequently qualifying for the grand final. It was later revealed that Ukraine placed sixth in the semi-final, receiving a total of 179 points: 114 points from the televoting and 65 points from the juries.

=== Final ===
Shortly after the second semi-final, a winners' press conference was held for the ten qualifying countries. As part of this press conference, the qualifying artists took part in a draw to determine which half of the grand final they would subsequently participate in. This draw was done in the order the countries were announced during the semi-final. Ukraine was drawn to compete in the first half. Following this draw, the shows' producers decided upon the running order of the final, as they had done for the semi-finals. Ukraine was subsequently placed to perform in position 1, before the entry from Spain.

Mélovin once again took part in dress rehearsals on 11 and 12 May before the final, including the jury final where the professional juries cast their final votes before the live show. Mélovin performed a repeat of his semi-final performance during the final on 12 May. Ukraine placed seventeenth in the final, scoring 130 points: 119 points from the televoting and 11 points from the juries.

=== Voting ===
Voting during the three shows involved each country awarding two sets of points from 1–8, 10 and 12: one from their professional jury and the other from televoting. Each nation's jury consisted of five music industry professionals who are citizens of the country they represent, with their names published before the contest to ensure transparency. This jury judged each entry based on: vocal capacity; the stage performance; the song's composition and originality; and the overall impression by the act. In addition, no member of a national jury was permitted to be related in any way to any of the competing acts in such a way that they cannot vote impartially and independently. The individual rankings of each jury member as well as the nation's televoting results were released shortly after the grand final.

Below is a breakdown of points awarded to Ukraine and awarded by Ukraine in the second semi-final and grand final of the contest, and the breakdown of the jury voting and televoting conducted during the two shows:

==== Points awarded to Ukraine ====
Points awarded to Ukraine (Semi-final 2)
Score	Televote	Jury
12 points	Poland	
10 points	Latvia; Georgia; Russia; San Marino	Montenegro
8 points	Italy	Moldova
7 points	Moldova; Montenegro	Australia; Georgia
6 points	Hungary	Malta; Netherlands; Russia
5 points	Australia; Denmark; Romania	Sweden
4 points	Norway	
3 points	France; Slovenia	Denmark; Norway
2 points	Malta; Netherlands; Serbia; Sweden	Poland
1 point	Germany	Latvia; San Marino

Points awarded to Ukraine (Final)
Score	Televote	Jury
12 points	Belarus; Czech Republic; Poland	
10 points	Moldova	
8 points	Azerbaijan; Georgia; Italy; Russia	
7 points	Israel; Montenegro	
6 points		Azerbaijan
5 points	San Marino	Moldova
4 points	Armenia; France; Macedonia; Portugal	
3 points	Latvia	
2 points	Cyprus	
1 point	Bulgaria	

==== Points awarded by Ukraine ====
Points awarded by Ukraine (Semi-final 2)
Score	Televote	Jury
12 points	Moldova	Netherlands
10 points	Denmark	Latvia
8 points	Norway	Georgia
7 points	Poland	Sweden
6 points	Slovenia	Australia
5 points	Georgia	Slovenia
4 points	Sweden	Denmark
3 points	Russia	Montenegro
2 points	Hungary	Romania
1 point	Latvia	Norway

Points awarded by Ukraine (Final)
Score	Televote	Jury
12 points	Israel	France
10 points	Czech Republic	Israel
8 points	Denmark	Netherlands
7 points	France	Austria
6 points	Moldova	Sweden
5 points	Italy	Slovenia
4 points	Cyprus	Czech Republic
3 points	Estonia	Denmark
2 points	Lithuania	Australia
1 point	Hungary	Estonia

==== Detailed voting results ====
The following members comprised the Ukrainian jury:

- Vitalii Klymov (jury chairperson) – producer, music video director
- Denys Zhupnyk – radio host, actor, singer
- Artur Danielyan – sound producer, musician. DJ
- Alla Moskovka (Alloise) – artist
- Khrystyna Soloviy – singer, songwriter, musician

Detailed voting results from Ukraine (Semi-final 2)
R/O	Country	Jury							Televote	
R/O	Country	D. Zhupnyk	A. Danielyan	V. Klymov	Alloise	K. Soloviy	Rank	Points	Rank	Points
01	Norway	8	11	6	10	16	10	1	3	8
02	Romania	10	16	8	7	8	9	2	16	
03	Serbia	11	5	9	16	13	12		13	
04	San Marino	13	10	11	17	14	16		17	
05	Denmark	7	13	4	12	1	7	4	2	10
06	Russia	17	12	16	15	17	17		8	3
07	Moldova	14	15	5	14	15	14		1	12
08	Netherlands	1	4	2	2	2	1	12	11	
09	Australia	3	3	10	6	6	5	6	12	
10	Georgia	9	2	1	11	5	3	8	6	5
11	Poland	15	17	12	9	11	15		4	7
12	Malta	5	9	17	13	12	13		15	
13	Hungary	16	14	14	4	9	11		9	2
14	Latvia	6	1	13	1	4	2	10	10	1
15	Sweden	2	8	3	5	7	4	7	7	4
16	Montenegro	12	7	15	8	3	8	3	14	
17	Slovenia	4	6	7	3	10	6	5	5	6
18	Ukraine									

Detailed voting results from Ukraine (Final)
R/O	Country	Jury							Televote	
R/O	Country	D. Zhupnyk	A. Danielyan	V. Klymov	Alloise	K. Soloviy	Rank	Points	Rank	Points
01	Ukraine									
02	Spain	17	16	25	23	7	18		24	
03	Slovenia	2	9	14	3	16	6	5	17	
04	Lithuania	14	22	11	16	17	20		9	2
05	Austria	6	4	5	12	3	4	7	14	
06	Estonia	12	2	16	11	18	10	1	8	3
07	Norway	10	3	13	14	21	12		11	
08	Portugal	24	21	18	24	9	23		25	
09	United Kingdom	21	20	23	9	23	24		22	
10	Serbia	13	12	17	22	19	22		21	
11	Germany	20	19	7	17	8	14		12	
12	Albania	4	15	6	18	15	11		18	
13	France	22	5	1	2	1	1	12	4	7
14	Czech Republic	8	6	9	4	22	7	4	2	10
15	Denmark	15	18	8	13	2	8	3	3	8
16	Australia	5	10	19	5	14	9	2	19	
17	Finland	16	24	22	20	24	25		23	
18	Bulgaria	23	17	10	19	10	17		13	
19	Moldova	11	23	12	15	25	19		5	6
20	Sweden	9	7	2	6	11	5	6	15	
21	Hungary	25	11	24	7	13	15		10	1
22	Israel	3	1	3	8	4	2	10	1	12
23	Netherlands	1	13	4	1	5	3	8	16	
24	Ireland	18	14	15	21	12	21		20	
25	Cyprus	7	8	20	10	20	13		7	4
26	Italy	19	25	21	25	6	16		6	5
