= Poland in the Eurovision Song Contest 2018 =

- Eurovision Song Contest 2018
- Participating broadcaster: Telewizja Polska (TVP)
- Country: Poland
- Selection process: Krajowe Eliminacje 2018
- Selection date: 3 March 2018

Competing entry
- Song: "Light Me Up"
- Artist: Gromee feat. Lukas Meijer
- Songwriters: Andrzej Gromala; Lukas Meijer; Mahan Moin; Christian Rabb

Placement
- Semi-final result: Failed to qualify (14th)

Participation chronology

Poland was represented at the Eurovision Song Contest 2018 with the song "Light Me Up" written by Andrzej Gromala, Lukas Meijer, Mahan Moin and Christian Rabb. The song was performed by Gromee featuring Lukas Meijer. The Polish broadcaster Telewizja Polska (TVP) organised the national final Krajowe Eliminacje 2018 in order to select the Polish entry for the 2018 contest in Lisbon, Portugal. The national final took place on 3 March 2018 and featured ten entries. "Light Me Up" performed by Gromee featuring Lukas Meijer was selected as the winner after gaining the most points following the combination of votes from a five-member jury panel and a public vote.

Poland was drawn to compete in the second semi-final of the Eurovision Song Contest which took place on 10 May 2018. Performing in position 11, "Light Me Up" was not announced among the ten qualifying entries of the second semi-final and therefore did not qualify to compete in the final. It was later revealed that Poland placed fourteenth out of the 18 participating countries in the semi-final with 81 points.

== Background ==
Prior to the 2018 contest, Poland had participated in the Eurovision Song Contest twenty times since its first entry in 1994. Poland's highest placement in the contest, to this point, has been second place, which the nation achieved with its debut entry in 1994 with the song "To nie ja!" performed by Edyta Górniak. Poland has only, thus far, reached the top ten on two other occasions, when Ich Troje performing the song "Keine Grenzen – Żadnych granic" finished seventh in 2003, and when Michał Szpak performing the song "Color of Your Life" finished eighth in 2016. Between 2005 and 2011, Poland failed to qualify from the semi-final round six out of seven years with only their 2008 entry, "For Life" performed by Isis Gee, managing to take the nation to the final during that period. After once again failing to qualify to the final in 2011, the country withdrew from the contest during 2012 and 2013. Since returning to the contest in 2014, Poland managed to qualify to the final each year including their 2017 entry, "Flashlight" performed by Kasia Moś.

The Polish national broadcaster, Telewizja Polska (TVP), broadcasts the event within Poland and organises the selection process for the nation's entry. TVP confirmed Poland's participation in the 2018 Eurovision Song Contest on 15 May 2017. Between 2006 and 2011, TVP organised televised national finals that featured a competition among several artists and songs in order to select the Polish entry for the Eurovision Song Contest. After returning to the contest in 2014 following their two-year absence, the broadcaster opted to internally select both the 2014 and 2015 entries but returned to select their 2016 and 2017 entries via a national final, a selection procedure that continued for their 2018 entry.

== Before Eurovision ==
=== Krajowe Eliminacje 2018 ===
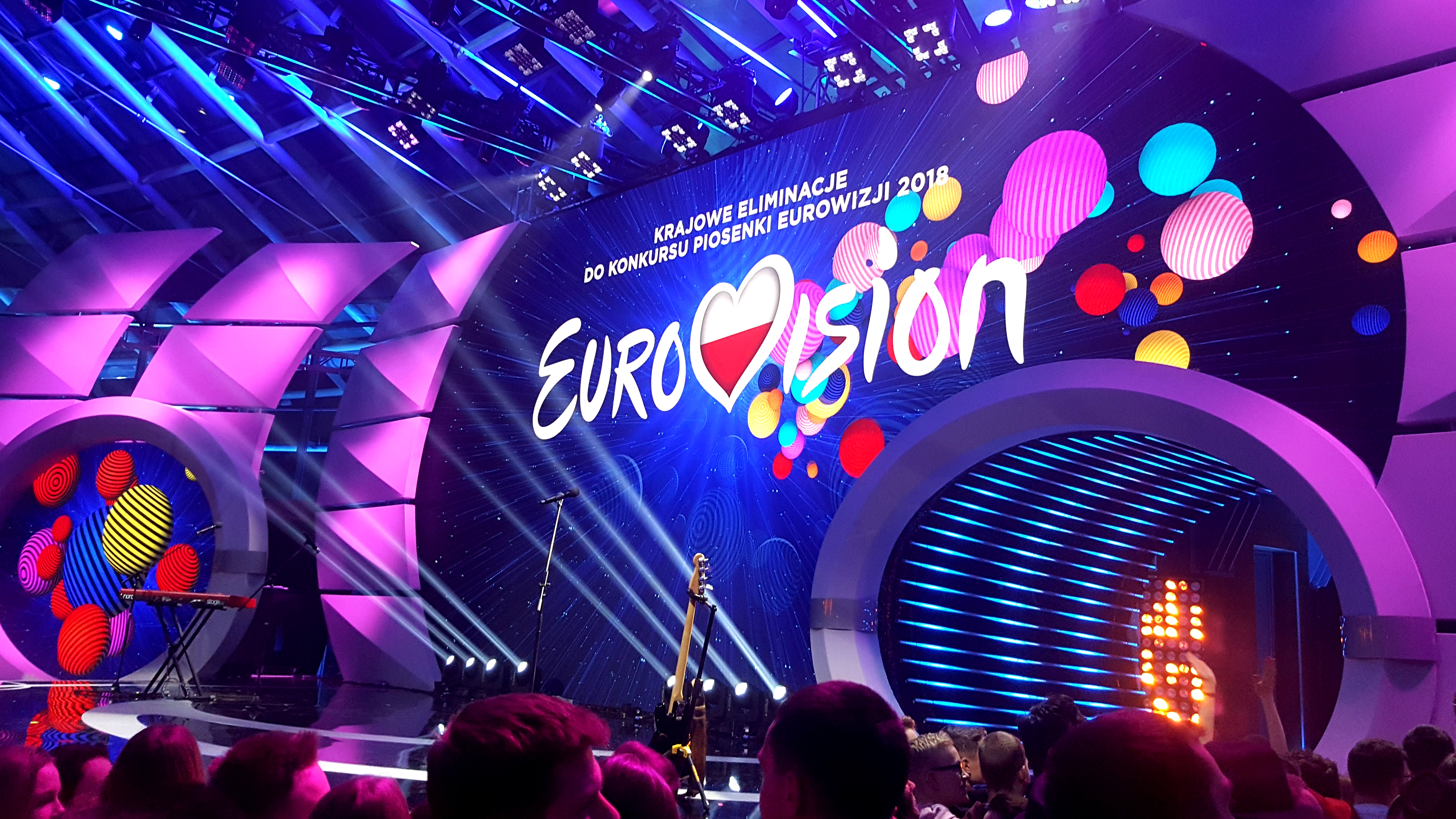
The stage of Krajowe Eliminacje 2018

Krajowe Eliminacje 2018 was the national final organised by TVP in order to select the Polish entry for the Eurovision Song Contest 2018. The show took place on 3 March 2018 at the TVP Headquarters in Warsaw, hosted by Artur Orzech. A combination of public televoting and jury voting selected the winner. The show was broadcast on TVP1 and TVP Polonia as well as streamed online at the broadcaster's website eurowizja.tvp.pl. The national final was watched by 1.78 million viewers in Poland.

==== Competing entries ====
TVP opened a submission period for interested artists and songwriters to submit their entries between 22 December 2017 and 1 February 2018. The broadcaster received 250 submissions at the closing of the deadline. A selection committee selected ten entries from the received submissions to compete in the national final. The selected entries were announced on 8 February 2018.

Artist	Song	Songwriter(s)
Gromee feat. Lukas Meijer	"Light Me Up"	Andrzej Gromala, Lukas Meijer, Mahan Moin, Christian Rabb
Future Folk	"Krakowiacy i Górale"	Matt Kowalsky
Happy Prince	"Don't Let Go"	Jakub Prachowski
Ifi Ude	"Love Is Stronger"	Ifi Ude, Polly Scattergood, Glenn Kerrigan, Paweł Dziemski
Isabell Otrębus	"Delirium"	Elize Ryd, Jonas Thander
Maja Hyży	"Błysk (Skin)"	Lanberry, Jakub Krupski, Krzysztof Morange, Michał Głuszczuk, Piotr Siejka
Marta Gałuszewska	"Why Don't We Go"	Marta Gałuszewska, Dominic Buczkowski-Wojtaszek, Sarah Reeve, Steven Manovski
Monika Urlik	"Momentum"	Ylva Persson, Linda Persson, Niklas Bergqvist, Simon Johansson
Pablosson	"Sunflower"	Paweł Stasiak, Jens Bjerelius
Saszan	"Nie chcę ciebie mniej"	Saszan, Lanberry, Piotr Siejka

==== Final ====
The televised final took place on 3 March 2018. Ten entries competed and the winner, "Light Me Up" performed by Gromee featuring Lukas Meijer, was determined by a 50/50 combination of votes from a five-member professional jury and a public vote. The jury consisted of Maryla Rodowicz (singer), Tabb (music producer), Jan Borysewicz (guitarist and leader of Lady Pank), Kasia Moś (2017 Polish Eurovision entrant) and Stefano Terrazzino (dancer, singer and choreographer). In addition to the performances of the competing entries, Swedish 2015 Eurovision winner Måns Zelmerlöw opened the show with his winning Eurovision song "Heroes", while 2004 Polish Eurovision entrants Blue Café, Moś and Zelmerlöw performed as the interval acts.

Final – 3 March 2018
R/O	Artist	Song	Jury	Televote	Total	Place
1	Pablosson	"Sunflower"	1	1	2	10
2	Marta Gałuszewska	"Why Don't We Go"	6	8	14	5
3	Maja Hyży	"Błysk (Skin)"	4	3	7	7
4	Future Folk	"Krakowiacy i Górale"	2	5	7	8
5	Isabell Otrębus	"Delirium"	3	2	5	9
6	Gromee feat. Lukas Meijer	"Light Me Up"	8	12	20	1
7	Happy Prince	"Don't Let Go"	12	7	19	2
8	Saszan	"Nie chcę ciebie mniej"	5	4	9	6
9	Ifi Ude	"Love Is Stronger"	10	6	16	4
10	Monika Urlik	"Momentum"	7	10	17	3

Detailed Jury Votes
R/O	Song	M. Rodowicz	Tabb	J. Borysewicz	K. Moś	S. Terrazzino	Total	Points
1	"Sunflower"	2	1	1	1	1	6	1
2	"Why Don't We Go"	5	3	7	6	4	25	6
3	"Błysk (Skin)"	3	6	4	5	2	20	4
4	"Krakowiacy i Górale"	1	2	6	4	3	16	2
5	"Delirium"	4	4	2	3	6	19	3
6	"Light Me Up"	12	12	3	7	8	42	8
7	"Don't Let Go"	10	8	10	12	12	52	12
8	"Nie chcę ciebie mniej"	6	5	5	2	5	23	5
9	"Love Is Stronger"	8	10	8	10	10	46	10
10	"Momentum"	7	7	12	8	7	41	7

== At Eurovision ==
According to Eurovision rules, all nations with the exceptions of the host country and the "Big Five" (France, Germany, Italy, Spain and the United Kingdom) are required to qualify from one of two semi-finals in order to compete for the final; the top ten countries from each semi-final progress to the final. The European Broadcasting Union (EBU) split up the competing countries into six different pots based on voting patterns from previous contests, with countries with favourable voting histories put into the same pot. On 29 January 2018, a special allocation draw was held which placed each country into one of the two semi-finals, as well as which half of the show they would perform in. Poland was placed into the second semi-final, to be held on 10 May 2018, and was scheduled to perform in the second half of the show.

Once all the competing songs for the 2018 contest had been released, the running order for the semi-finals was decided by the shows' producers rather than through another draw, so that similar songs were not placed next to each other. Poland was set to perform in position 11, following the entry from Georgia and before the entry from Malta.

The two semi-finals and the final were broadcast in Poland on TVP1 and TVP Polonia with commentary by Artur Orzech. The three shows also aired on a one-day delay on TVP Rozrywka. The Polish spokesperson, who announced the top 12-point score awarded by the Polish jury during the final, was Mateusz Szymkowiak.

=== Semi-final ===
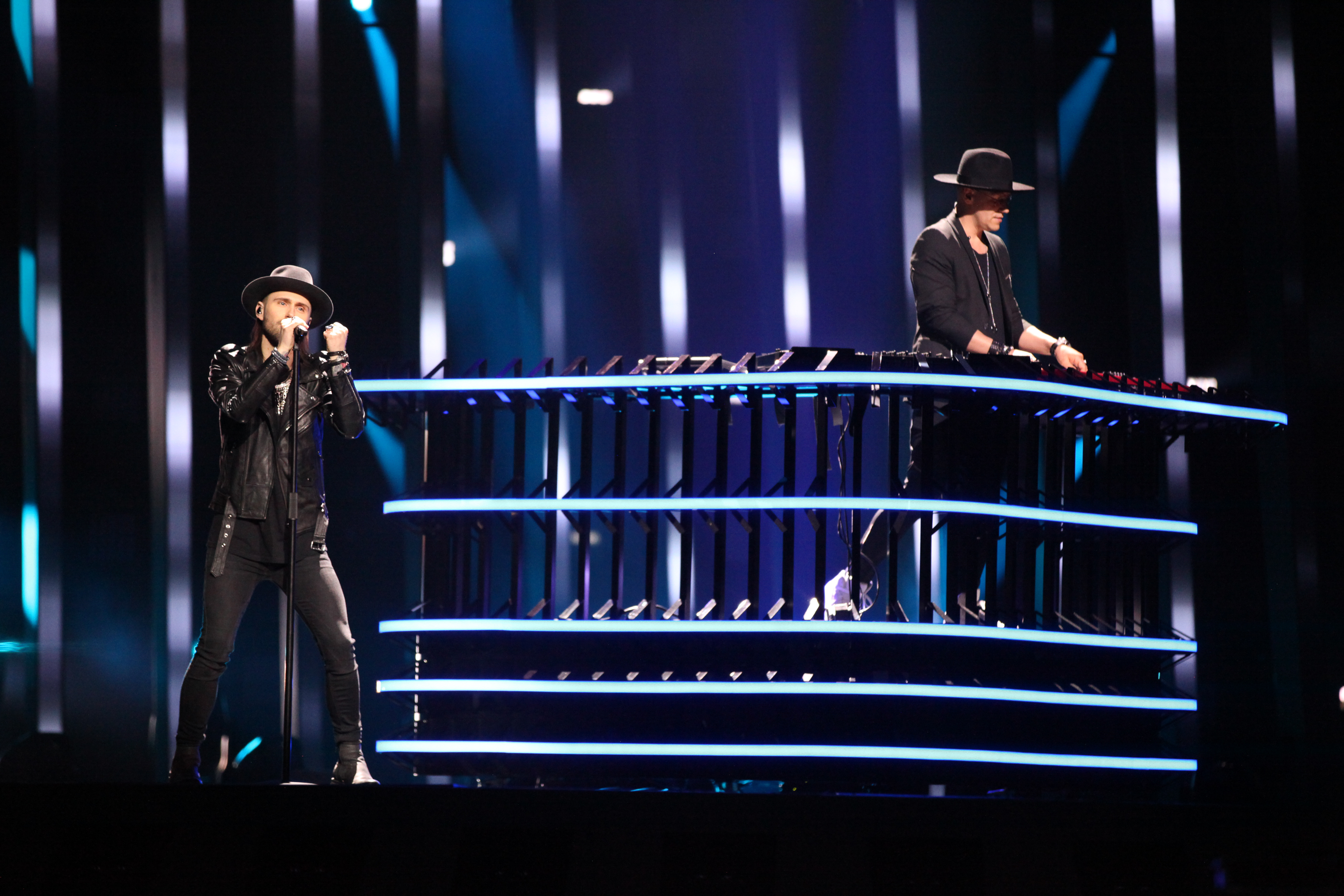
Gromee and Lukas Meijer during a rehearsal before the second semi-final

Gromee and Lukas Meijer took part in technical rehearsals on 2 and 5 May, followed by dress rehearsals on 7 and 8 May. This included the jury show on 7 May where the professional juries of each country watched and voted on the competing entries.

The Polish performance featured Lukas Meijer performing in a black leather jacket, black trousers and a black hat, with Gromee, dressed in black, standing in an elevated see-through DJ booth on stage. The performers were also flanked by three backing singers on one side of the stage and a guitarist on the other. As the song progressed, Meijer made use of the stage bridges in order to conclude the performance on the outer ring of the stage. The stage predominately displayed pink and blue colours with pyrotechnic effects also being featured during the performance. The guitarist that joined Gromee and Meijer on stage was the co-composer of "Light Me Up" Christian Rabb, while the backing vocalists were: Kasia Dereń, the co-composer of "Light Me Up" Mahan Moin and Sara Chmiel-Gromala.

At the end of the show, Poland was not announced among the top 10 entries in the second semi-final and therefore failed to qualify to compete in the final. It was later revealed that Poland placed fourteenth in the semi-final, receiving a total of 81 points: 60 points from the televoting and 21 points from the juries.

=== Voting ===
Voting during the three shows involved each country awarding two sets of points from 1–8, 10 and 12: one from their professional jury and the other from televoting. Each nation's jury consisted of five music industry professionals who are citizens of the country they represent, with their names published before the contest to ensure transparency. This jury judged each entry based on: vocal capacity; the stage performance; the song's composition and originality; and the overall impression by the act. In addition, no member of a national jury was permitted to be related in any way to any of the competing acts in such a way that they cannot vote impartially and independently. The individual rankings of each jury member as well as the nation's televoting results were released shortly after the grand final.

Below is a breakdown of points awarded to Poland and awarded by Poland in the second semi-final and grand final of the contest, and the breakdown of the jury voting and televoting conducted during the two shows:

==== Points awarded to Poland ====
Points awarded to Poland (Semi-final 2)
Score	Televote	Jury
12 points	Germany	
10 points		
8 points	Sweden	
7 points	France; Hungary; Ukraine	
6 points	Norway	
5 points	Netherlands	Netherlands
4 points	Denmark	France; Hungary
3 points	Italy	
2 points		Germany; Russia; San Marino
1 point	Malta	Norway; Sweden

==== Points awarded by Poland ====
Points awarded by Poland (Semi-final 2)
Score	Televote	Jury
12 points	Ukraine	Sweden
10 points	Hungary	Netherlands
8 points	Denmark	Australia
7 points	Norway	Latvia
6 points	Slovenia	Hungary
5 points	Sweden	Slovenia
4 points	Latvia	Norway
3 points	Australia	Romania
2 points	Moldova	Ukraine
1 point	Netherlands	Malta

Points awarded by Poland (Final)
Score	Televote	Jury
12 points	Ukraine	Austria
10 points	Israel	Germany
8 points	Cyprus	Netherlands
7 points	Hungary	Albania
6 points	Denmark	Sweden
5 points	Italy	Ireland
4 points	Czech Republic	Australia
3 points	France	Hungary
2 points	Ireland	Bulgaria
1 point	Germany	Lithuania

==== Detailed voting results ====
The following members comprised the Polish jury:

- Dorota Szpetkowska (jury chairperson) – TV director
- Michał Szpak – singer, represented Poland in the 2016 contest
- Natalia Szroeder – singer
- Sławek Uniatowski – singer
- Michał Grott – musician, composer, producer

Detailed voting results from Poland (Semi-final 2)
R/O	Country	Jury							Televote	
R/O	Country	D. Szpetkowska	M. Szpak	N. Szroeder	S. Uniatowski	M. Grott	Rank	Points	Rank	Points
01	Norway	8	8	8	11	4	7	4	4	7
02	Romania	7	7	10	4	13	8	3	16	
03	Serbia	14	16	16	12	7	13		14	
04	San Marino	10	17	7	14	17	11		17	
05	Denmark	13	10	9	15	14	12		3	8
06	Russia	12	13	15	13	15	16		11	
07	Moldova	17	14	17	17	16	17		9	2
08	Netherlands	2	2	3	2	3	2	10	10	1
09	Australia	5	3	2	3	2	3	8	8	3
10	Georgia	15	15	13	8	12	14		12	
11	Poland									
12	Malta	11	9	11	7	10	10	1	13	
13	Hungary	6	5	4	6	8	5	6	2	10
14	Latvia	3	4	5	5	6	4	7	7	4
15	Sweden	1	1	1	1	1	1	12	6	5
16	Montenegro	16	11	14	16	11	15		15	
17	Slovenia	4	6	6	9	9	6	5	5	6
18	Ukraine	9	12	12	10	5	9	2	1	12

Detailed voting results from Poland (Final)
R/O	Country	Jury							Televote	
R/O	Country	D. Szpetkowska	M. Szpak	N. Szroeder	S. Uniatowski	M. Grott	Rank	Points	Rank	Points
01	Ukraine	16	19	14	16	12	16		1	12
02	Spain	8	14	12	9	11	11		24	
03	Slovenia	13	15	19	12	24	17		16	
04	Lithuania	4	16	9	11	13	10	1	14	
05	Austria	3	1	1	1	1	1	12	15	
06	Estonia	15	11	10	13	23	14		12	
07	Norway	11	22	16	17	6	12		11	
08	Portugal	17	13	13	10	19	15		26	
09	United Kingdom	23	21	22	24	21	25		21	
10	Serbia	25	20	25	25	18	24		23	
11	Germany	1	3	6	2	2	2	10	10	1
12	Albania	2	10	2	6	4	4	7	25	
13	France	22	17	20	22	14	20		8	3
14	Czech Republic	14	23	18	23	16	18		7	4
15	Denmark	21	25	23	21	17	23		5	6
16	Australia	9	5	11	7	7	7	4	19	
17	Finland	20	24	21	19	20	22		22	
18	Bulgaria	10	6	8	18	5	9	2	18	
19	Moldova	26	26	26	26	26	26		17	
20	Sweden	6	4	4	4	3	5	6	13	
21	Hungary	12	7	5	8	10	8	3	4	7
22	Israel	19	12	24	20	25	19		2	10
23	Netherlands	5	2	3	3	8	3	8	20	
24	Ireland	7	9	7	5	9	6	5	9	2
25	Cyprus	18	8	15	14	15	13		3	8
26	Italy	24	18	17	15	22	21		6	5
