= Paweł Stasiak =

Polish singer (born 1967)

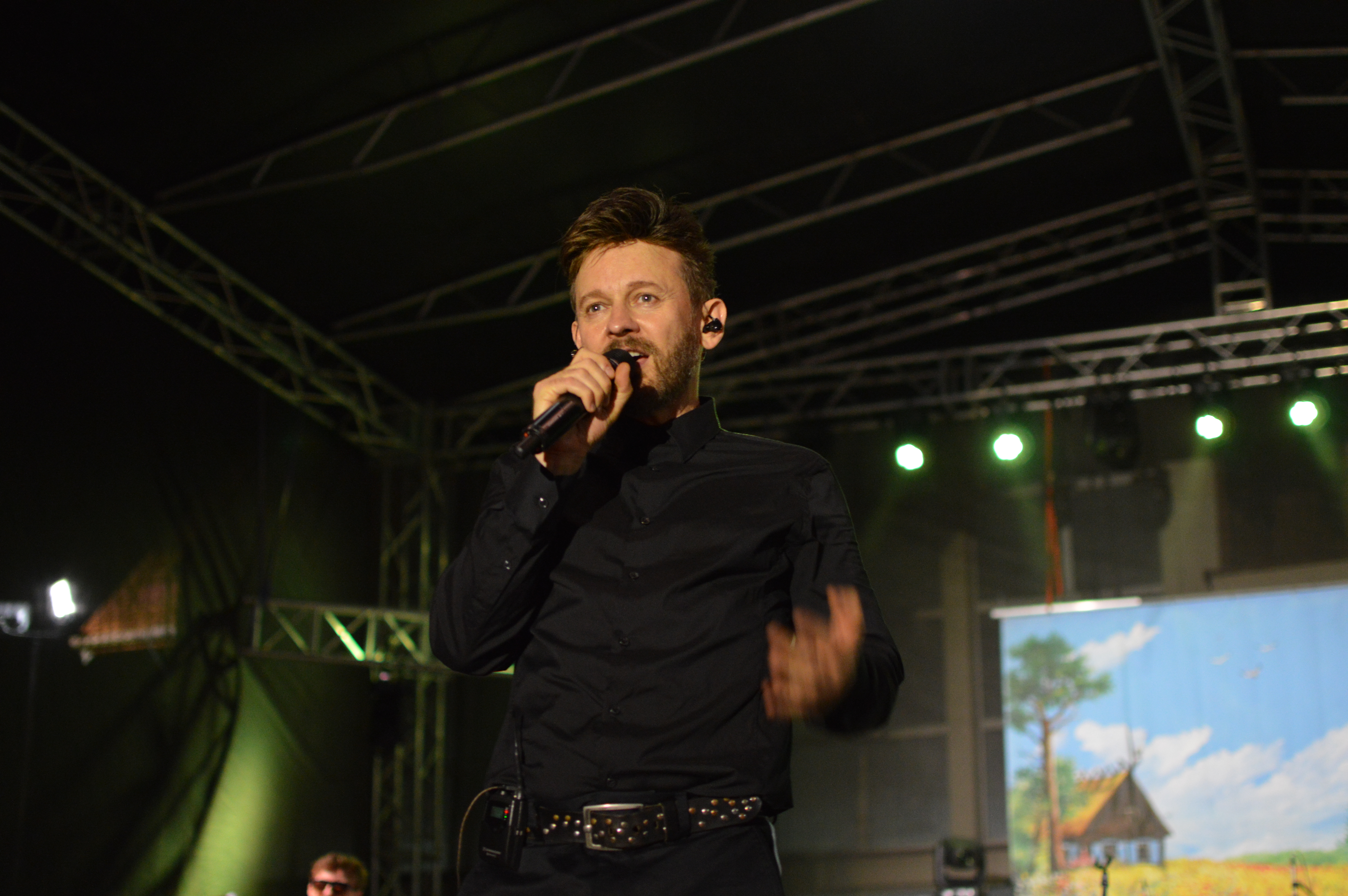
- Stasiak in 2019

Background information
- Born: 19 November 1967 (age 58); Łódź, Poland
- Occupation: Singer
- Instrument: Vocals

Paweł Stasiak, also known as Pablosson (born 19 November 1967), is a Polish singer. He is currently the lead singer of musical group Papa D, a revival of the band Papa Dance from the 1980s, of which he was also the lead singer.

== Biography ==
As a child he was a member of musical group Gawęda. In 1980 he played an episode in movie The Smaller Sky (based on novel by John Wain, directory Janusz Morgenstern). He was a Broadcast Radio music presenter with radio stations Rozgłośnia Harcerska and Polskie Radio Program III from 1983 to 1985.

In the 1980s, Stasiak was on the technical staff of the popular pop music "boy band" Papa Dance. He became the lead singer in 1986, replacing Grzegorz Wawrzyszak. With the band released two LP's: Poniżej krytyki (1986) and Nasz ziemski Eden (1988). In 1986 the song Naj story was the number one on the Lista Przebojów Programu Trzeciego.

The band stopped activity in 1990, and Stasiak has started his solo career under the name "Mr. Dance." He published three LP's: Mr Dance, Pozdrowienia dla Papa Dance and Życzenia.

Group Papa Dance was revived in 2001 with Stasiak as a vocalist. In 2007 the group changed its name to Papa D.

In 2008, he competed as a celebrity dancer in the eighth season of Taniec z Gwiazdami but was the first one eliminated. With Janja Lesar he was eliminated in the first episode. In 2008, he also publicly divorced his American wife Diana and married again.

In 2015, he went on an international tour as Papa D, playing familiar hits. Around this time, he says he fell in love with Sweden, and started learning Swedish.

In 2016, he was playing as himself (kidnapped pop-music singer) in the 200th episode of popular TV series Ojciec Mateusz.

He is currently the lead singer of Papa D. He also announced his solo career under the name Pablosson, after splitting with Mariusz Zabrocki, and is performing under that name at the 2018 Eurovision Song Contest with the song "Sunflower." "Sunflower" was a collaboration with Jens Bjerelius. In 2018, as Pablosson, he participated in the Polish national final for the Eurovision Song Contest 2018.

He has stated he's always been in show business, and has never had a "normal" job.
