= Denmark in the Eurovision Song Contest 2018 =

- Eurovision Song Contest 2018
- Country: Denmark
- Selection process: Dansk Melodi Grand Prix 2018
- Selection date: 10 February 2018

Competing entry
- Song: "Higher Ground"
- Artist: Rasmussen
- Songwriters: Niclas Arn; Karl Eurén

Placement
- Semi-final result: Qualified (5th, 204 points)
- Final result: 9th, 226 points

Participation chronology

Denmark was represented at the Eurovision Song Contest 2018 with the song "Higher Ground" written by Niclas Arn and Karl Eurén. The song was performed by Rasmussen. The Danish broadcaster DR organised the national final Dansk Melodi Grand Prix 2018 in order to select the Danish entry for the 2018 contest in Lisbon, Portugal. Ten songs competed in a televised show where "Higher Ground" performed by Rasmussen was the winner as decided upon through the combination of jury voting and public voting over two rounds.

Denmark was drawn to compete in the second semi-final of the Eurovision Song Contest which took place on 10 May 2018. Performing during the show in position 5, "Higher Ground" was announced among the top 10 entries of the second semi-final and therefore qualified to compete in the final on 12 May. It was later revealed that Denmark placed fifth out of the 18 participating countries in the semi-final with 204 points. In the final, Denmark performed in position 15 and placed ninth out of the 26 participating countries, scoring 226 points.

== Background ==
Prior to the 2018 contest, Denmark had participated in the Eurovision Song Contest forty-six times since their first entry in 1957. Denmark had won the contest, to this point, on three occasions: in 1963 with the song "Dansevise" performed by Grethe and Jørgen Ingmann, and twice in Sweden: in 2000 with the song "Fly on the Wings of Love" performed by Olsen Brothers, and again in 2013 with the song "Only Teardrops" performed by Emmelie de Forest. In the 2017 contest, "Where I Am" performed by Anja Nissen qualified Denmark to the final placing twentieth.

The Danish national broadcaster, DR, broadcasts the event within Denmark and organises the selection process for the nation's entry. DR confirmed their intentions to participate at the 2018 Eurovision Song Contest on 4 July 2017. Denmark has selected all of their Eurovision entries through the national final Dansk Melodi Grand Prix. Along with their participation confirmation, the broadcaster announced that Dansk Melodi Grand Prix 2018 would be organised in order to select Denmark's entry for the 2018 contest.

== Before Eurovision ==
=== Dansk Melodi Grand Prix 2018 ===
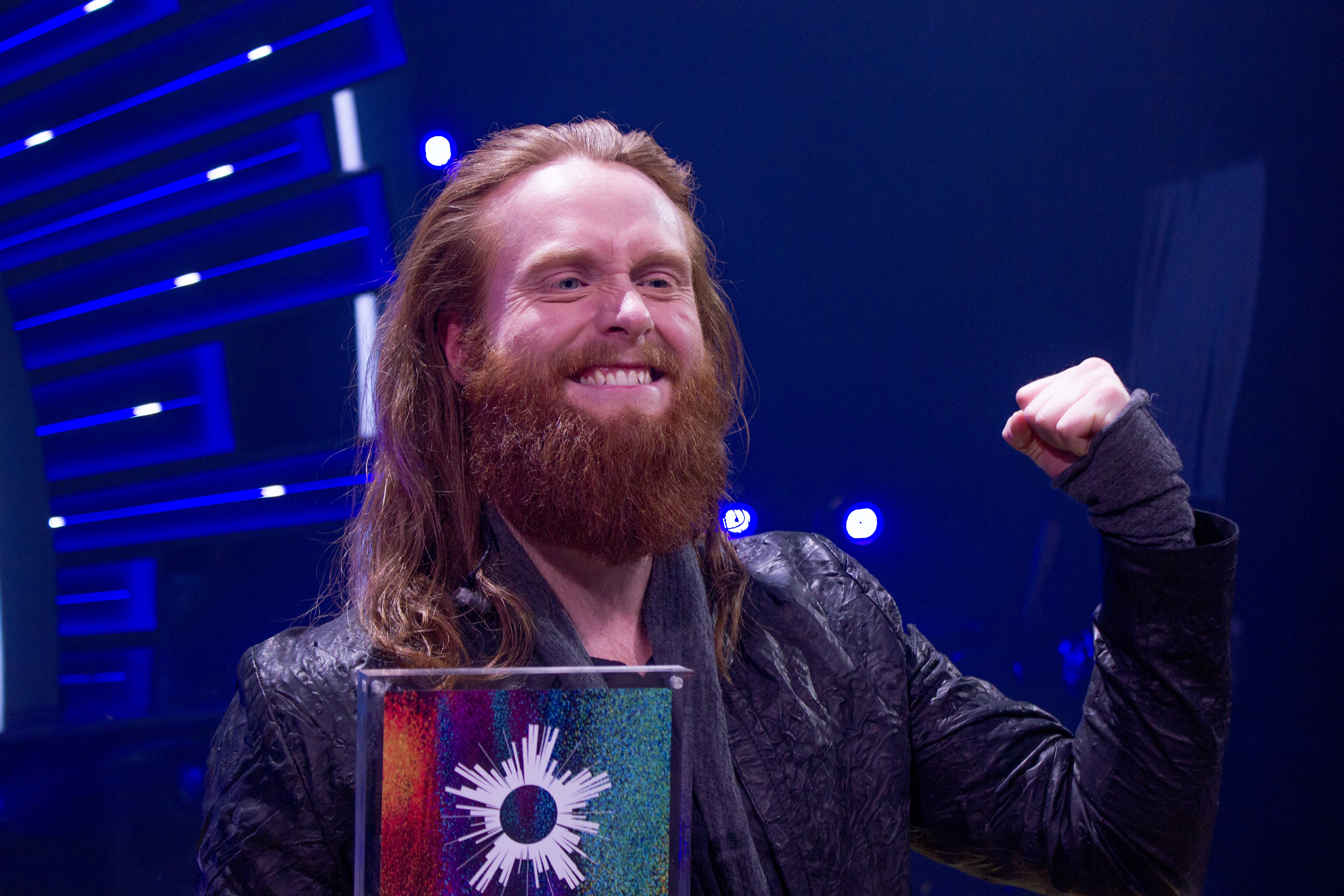
Rasmussen at Dansk Melodi Grand Prix 2018

Dansk Melodi Grand Prix 2018 was the 48th edition of Dansk Melodi Grand Prix, the music competition that selects Denmark's entries for the Eurovision Song Contest. The event was held on 10 February 2018 at the Gigantium in Aalborg, hosted by Annette Heick and Johannes Nymark and televised on DR1 as well as streamed online at DR TV. The national final was watched by 1.393 million viewers in Denmark.

==== Format ====
Ten songs competed in one show where the winner was determined over two rounds of voting. In the first round, the top three songs based on the combination of votes from a public vote and a five-member jury panel qualified to the superfinal. In the superfinal, the winner was determined by the public and jury vote. Viewers were able to vote via SMS or a mobile application specifically designed for the competition. Viewers using the app to cast a vote were provided with one free vote. The five-member jury panel was composed of five Danish Eurovision fans: Julie Lund Mikkelsen, Jens Erik Møller, Morten Madsen, Christian Kaad and Anna Bennike.

==== Competing entries ====
DR opened a submission period on 4 July 2017 for artists and composers to submit their entries. Entries could be submitted throughout the year, however only songs submitted by 15 September 2017 were considered for the 2018 edition of the competition. Mads Enggaard, who was appointed as the new music producer of Dansk Melodi Grand Prix, stated that the competition would seek out "songs that are inspiring and create pictures and arouse emotions". 30 songs were shortlisted from the entries submitted to the broadcaster and a selection committee of Dansk Melodi Grand Prix fans, members of the public and industry professionals selected ten songs. DR held a press meet and greet at the Koncerthuset in Copenhagen on 22 January 2018 where the competing artists and songs were announced and officially presented.

Artist	Song	Songwriter(s)
Albin Fredy	"Music for the Road"	Rune Braager, John Garrison, Olivio Antonio
Anna Ritsmar	"Starlight"	Lise Cabble
Carlsen	"Standing Up for Love"	Thomas Thörnholm, Michael Clauss, Dave Rude
Ditte Marie	"Riot"	Theis Andersen, Lise Cabble, Chris Wahle
Karui	"Signals"	Annelie Karui Saemala Overbeck, Jeanette Bonde, Daniel Fält, Jonas Halager
Lasse Meling	"Unfound"	Lasse Meling, Kim Nowak-Zorde, TheArrangement
Rasmussen	"Higher Ground"	Niclas Arn, Karl Eurén
Rikke Ganer-Tolsøe	"Holder fast i ingenting"	Rune Braager, Clara Sofie Fabricius, Andrea Emilie Fredslund Nørgaard
Sandra	"Angels to My Battlefield"	Chief 1, Ronny Vidar Svendsen, Anne Judith Stokke Wik, Nermin Harambasic, Sandra Hilal
Sannie	"Boys on Girls"	Sannie Carlson, Domenico Canu, James Reeves

==== Final ====
The final took place on 10 February 2018. In the first round of voting the top three advanced to a superfinal based on the votes of a five-member jury (50%) and a public vote (50%). In the superfinal, the winner, "Higher Ground" performed by Rasmussen, was selected by the public and jury vote. In addition to the performances of the competing entries, Austrian Eurovision Song Contest 2014 winner Conchita Wurst performed as the interval act.

Final – 10 February 2018
R/O	Artist	Song	Result
1	Ditte Marie	"Riot"	—N/a
2	Anna Ritsmar	"Starlight"	Advanced
3	Rasmussen	"Higher Ground"	Advanced
4	Sannie	"Boys on Girls"	—N/a
5	Sandra	"Angels to My Battlefield"	—N/a
6	Lasse Meling	"Unfound"	—N/a
7	Carlsen	"Standing Up for Love"	—N/a
8	Karui	"Signals"	—N/a
9	Rikke Ganer-Tolsøe	"Holder fast i ingenting"	—N/a
10	Albin Fredy	"Music for the Road"	Advanced

Superfinal – 10 February 2018
R/O	Artist	Song	Jury	Televote	Total	Place
1	Anna Ritsmar	"Starlight"	13%	18%	31%	2
2	Rasmussen	"Higher Ground"	30%	20%	50%	1
3	Albin Fredy	"Music for the Road"	7%	12%	19%	3

=== Promotion ===
Rasmussen made several appearances across Europe to specifically promote "Higher Ground" as the Danish Eurovision entry. On 5 April, Rasmussen performed during the London Eurovision Party, which was held at the Café de Paris venue in London, United Kingdom and hosted by Nicki French and Paddy O'Connell. Between 8 and 11 April, Rasmussen took part in promotional activities in Tel Aviv, Israel and performed during the Israel Calling event held at the Rabin Square. On 14 April, Rasmussen performed during the Eurovision in Concert event which was held at the AFAS Live venue in Amsterdam, Netherlands and hosted by Edsilia Rombley and Cornald Maas.

== At Eurovision ==
According to Eurovision rules, all nations with the exceptions of the host country and the "Big Five" (France, Germany, Italy, Spain and the United Kingdom) are required to qualify from one of two semi-finals in order to compete for the final; the top ten countries from each semi-final progress to the final. The European Broadcasting Union (EBU) split up the competing countries into six different pots based on voting patterns from previous contests, with countries with favourable voting histories put into the same pot. On 29 January 2018, a special allocation draw was held which placed each country into one of the two semi-finals, as well as which half of the show they would perform in. Denmark was placed into the second semi-final, to be held on 10 May 2018, and was scheduled to perform in the first half of the show.

Once all the competing songs for the 2018 contest had been released, the running order for the semi-finals was decided by the shows' producers rather than through another draw, so that similar songs were not placed next to each other. Denmark was set to perform in position 5, following the entry from San Marino and before the entry from Russia.

The two semi-finals and final were broadcast on DR1 with commentary by Ole Tøpholm. The Danish spokesperson, who announced the top 12-point score awarded by the Danish jury during the final, was Ulla Essendrop.

=== Semi-final ===
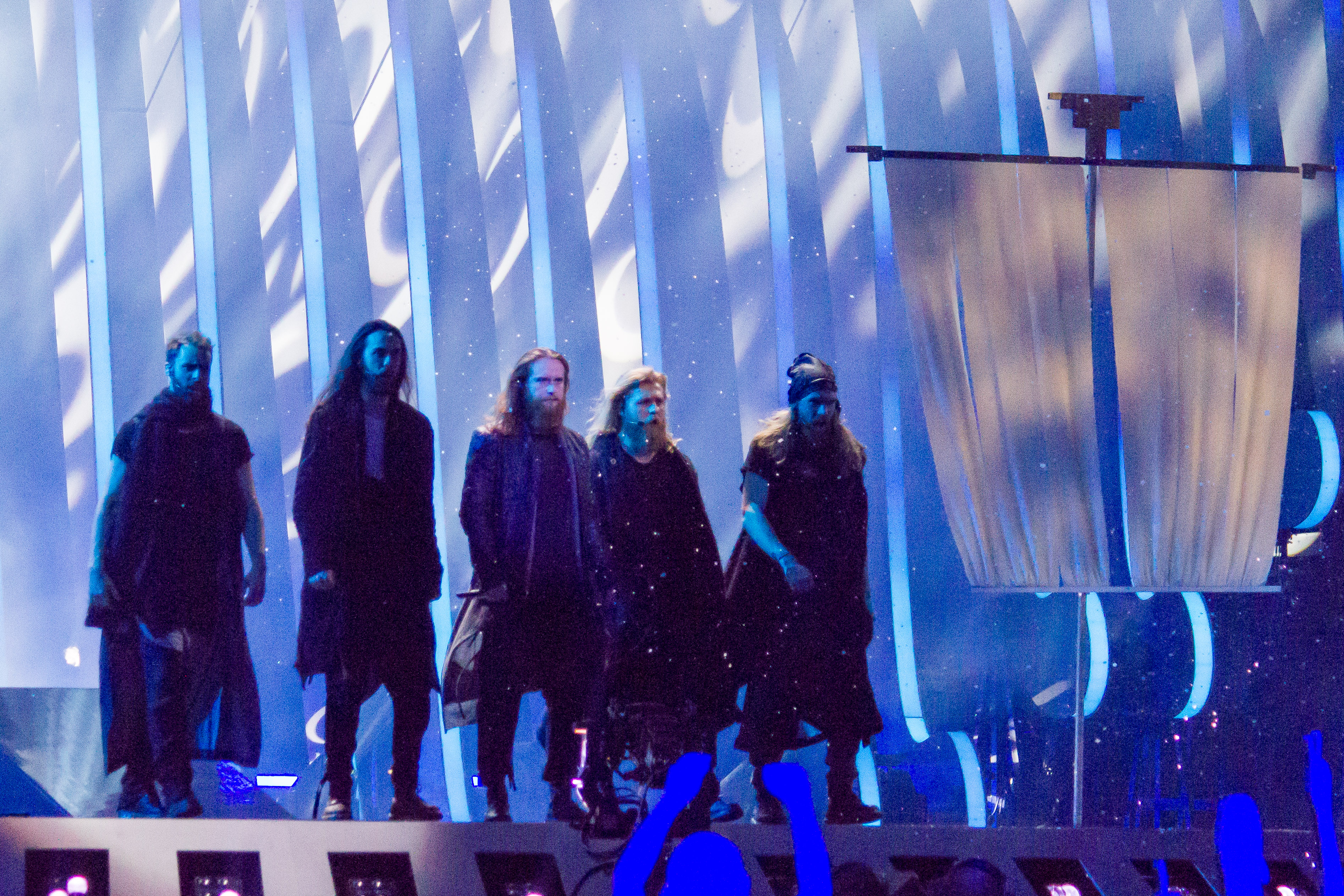
Rasmussen during a rehearsal before the second semi-final

Rasmussen took part in technical rehearsals on 1 and 5 May, followed by dress rehearsals on 9 and 10 May. This included the jury show on 9 May where the professional juries of each country watched and voted on the competing entries.

The Danish performance featured Rasmussen dressed in a black costume and performing with four backing vocalists. The stage colours were predominantly blue and white and white sails were located on both sides of the stage. During the final chorus of the song, one of the backing vocalists went to the back of the stage and waved a big white flag with several effects including snow and a wind machine. Following technical rehearsals, the Danish delegation requested a harsher snowfall effect as the snow provided by the Portuguese broadcaster was too light and fluffy for the song. This request was granted. The four backing vocalists that joined Rasmussen on stage were: Daniel Firth, Gustav Emil Bresler, Jesper Paasch and Mads Engelhardt. An additional off-stage backing vocalist was also featured: Anders Ørsager.

At the end of the show, Denmark was announced as having finished in the top 10 and subsequently qualifying for the grand final. It was later revealed that Denmark placed fifth in the semi-final, receiving a total of 204 points: 164 points from the televoting and 40 points from the juries.

=== Final ===
Shortly after the second semi-final, a winners' press conference was held for the ten qualifying countries. As part of this press conference, the qualifying artists took part in a draw to determine which half of the grand final they would subsequently participate in. This draw was done in the order the countries were announced during the semi-final. Denmark was drawn to compete in the second half. Following this draw, the shows' producers decided upon the running order of the final, as they had done for the semi-finals. Denmark was subsequently placed to perform in position 15, following the entry from the Czech Republic and before the entry from Australia.

Rasmussen once again took part in dress rehearsals on 11 and 12 May before the final, including the jury final where the professional juries cast their final votes before the live show. Rasmussen performed a repeat of his semi-final performance during the final on 12 May. Denmark placed ninth in the final, scoring 226 points: 188 points from the televoting and 38 points from the juries.

=== Voting ===
Voting during the three shows involved each country awarding two sets of points from 1–8, 10 and 12: one from their professional jury and the other from televoting. Each nation's jury consisted of five music industry professionals who are citizens of the country they represent, with their names published before the contest to ensure transparency. This jury judged each entry based on: vocal capacity; the stage performance; the song's composition and originality; and the overall impression by the act. In addition, no member of a national jury was permitted to be related in any way to any of the competing acts in such a way that they cannot vote impartially and independently. The individual rankings of each jury member as well as the nation's televoting results were released shortly after the grand final.

Below is a breakdown of points awarded to Denmark and awarded by Denmark in the second semi-final and grand final of the contest, and the breakdown of the jury voting and televoting conducted during the two shows:

==== Points awarded to Denmark ====
Points awarded to Denmark (Semi-final 2)
Score	Televote	Jury
12 points	Australia; Hungary; Netherlands; Norway; San Marino; Sweden	
10 points	Germany; Ukraine	Italy
8 points	Malta; Poland; Romania; Slovenia	Malta
7 points	Italy; Latvia; Russia	
6 points		Australia
5 points	France	Hungary; Serbia
4 points	Moldova; Serbia	Ukraine
3 points	Georgia; Montenegro	
2 points		
1 point		Moldova; Montenegro

Points awarded to Denmark (Final)
Score	Televote	Jury
12 points	Hungary; Iceland; Sweden	Hungary
10 points	Australia; Finland; Lithuania; Norway	
8 points	Estonia; Netherlands; Ukraine	Italy
7 points	Belarus; Czech Republic; Russia; Slovenia	
6 points	Poland; San Marino	Montenegro
5 points	Austria; Belgium; Latvia	
4 points	Israel; Italy; Serbia	
3 points	Germany	Belarus; Finland; Ukraine
2 points	Croatia; France; Georgia; Ireland; Malta; Portugal; Romania; Switzerland; United Kingdom	Israel
1 point		Georgia

==== Points awarded by Denmark ====
Points awarded by Denmark (Semi-final 2)
Score	Televote	Jury
12 points	Norway	Australia
10 points	Sweden	Sweden
8 points	Australia	Malta
7 points	Netherlands	Latvia
6 points	Moldova	Norway
5 points	Ukraine	Netherlands
4 points	Poland	Slovenia
3 points	Slovenia	Ukraine
2 points	Latvia	Moldova
1 point	Malta	Serbia

Points awarded by Denmark (Final)
Score	Televote	Jury
12 points	Germany	Germany
10 points	Austria	Australia
8 points	Norway	Austria
7 points	Sweden	Estonia
6 points	Czech Republic	Spain
5 points	Netherlands	Cyprus
4 points	Ireland	Sweden
3 points	United Kingdom	Israel
2 points	Australia	France
1 point	Cyprus	Bulgaria

==== Detailed voting results ====
The following members comprised the Danish jury:

- Brian Risberg Clausen (Bryan Rice; jury chairperson) – singer
- Søs Fenger – singer and songwriter
- Emmelie de Forest – singer, winner of the Eurovision Song Contest 2013
- Linda Andreasen (Linda Andrews) – singer and songwriter
- Lasse Meling – singer and songwriter

Detailed voting results from Denmark (Semi-final 2)
R/O	Country	Jury							Televote	
R/O	Country	B. Rice	S. Fenger	E. de Forest	L. Andrews	L. Meling	Rank	Points	Rank	Points
01	Norway	7	12	6	3	3	5	6	1	12
02	Romania	13	8	13	13	12	14		14	
03	Serbia	16	7	11	5	13	10	1	12	
04	San Marino	17	17	8	17	11	16		13	
05	Denmark									
06	Russia	14	10	17	4	14	11		15	
07	Moldova	9	15	4	7	10	9	2	5	6
08	Netherlands	5	14	3	6	4	6	5	4	7
09	Australia	3	2	1	1	1	1	12	3	8
10	Georgia	12	9	15	12	17	15		16	
11	Poland	10	13	14	15	5	12		7	4
12	Malta	2	6	5	8	7	3	8	10	1
13	Hungary	15	11	9	16	6	13		11	
14	Latvia	6	5	7	9	2	4	7	9	2
15	Sweden	1	3	2	2	8	2	10	2	10
16	Montenegro	11	16	16	11	16	17		17	
17	Slovenia	4	4	10	10	9	7	4	8	3
18	Ukraine	8	1	12	14	15	8	3	6	5

Detailed voting results from Denmark (Final)
R/O	Country	Jury							Televote	
R/O	Country	B. Rice	S. Fenger	E. de Forest	L. Andrews	L. Meling	Rank	Points	Rank	Points
01	Ukraine	11	12	25	23	19	19		18	
02	Spain	4	4	21	5	5	5	6	20	
03	Slovenia	9	8	23	22	25	16		21	
04	Lithuania	8	20	10	15	23	15		16	
05	Austria	6	9	2	3	9	3	8	2	10
06	Estonia	10	1	17	7	4	4	7	12	
07	Norway	24	21	9	17	15	18		3	8
08	Portugal	20	13	16	20	22	23		25	
09	United Kingdom	15	15	6	21	18	14		8	3
10	Serbia	23	11	19	8	6	12		23	
11	Germany	3	7	1	1	3	1	12	1	12
12	Albania	22	23	15	25	20	24		24	
13	France	17	6	5	6	24	9	2	13	
14	Czech Republic	7	24	11	11	16	13		5	6
15	Denmark									
16	Australia	1	3	3	10	1	2	10	9	2
17	Finland	12	25	13	19	17	20		15	
18	Bulgaria	18	17	18	9	2	10	1	22	
19	Moldova	21	22	22	18	21	25		14	
20	Sweden	5	10	8	2	10	7	4	4	7
21	Hungary	25	14	20	24	12	22		19	
22	Israel	13	2	4	16	13	8	3	11	
23	Netherlands	19	19	12	13	11	17		6	5
24	Ireland	14	16	14	4	8	11		7	4
25	Cyprus	2	5	7	12	7	6	5	10	1
26	Italy	16	18	24	14	14	21		17	
