= Maja Hyży =

Polish singer

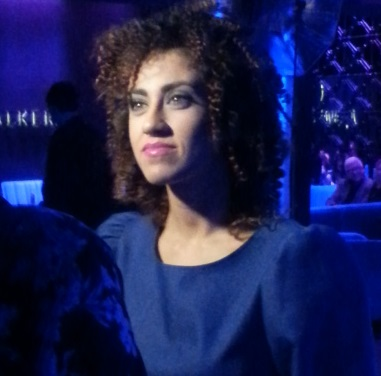
- Maja Hyży (2017)
- Born: Maja Krygier; 3 December 1989 (age 36); Kołobrzeg, Poland

Maja Hyży (née Krygier; born 3 December 1989) is a Polish singer. Hyży participated in X Factor where she eventually placed fourth. She has released the music single "Kawa" which peaked at number 7 at the Polish single chart. She participated in the Polish national final for the Eurovision Song Contest 2018 and she took 7th place.

== Discography ==
=== Albums ===
| Album title | Album details | Peak chart positions |
| Album title | Album details | POL |
|---|---|---|
| W Chmurach | Released: 24 March 2015; Label: QL City; Formats: CD, digital download | — |

=== Singles ===
| Title | Year | Peak chart positions | Album |
| Title | Year | POL | Album |
|---|---|---|---|
| "Zgadnij" | 2013 | — | |
| "Bluza" | 2013 | — | |
| "Kawa" | 2014 | 7 | W Chmurach |
| "Będę Kochać" | 2014 | — | W Chmurach |
| "Błysk (Skin)" | 2018 | — | |
"—" denotes items which were not released in that country or failed to chart.
