= Switzerland in the Eurovision Song Contest 2018 =

- Eurovision Song Contest 2018
- Participating broadcaster: Swiss Broadcasting Corporation (SRG SSR)
- Country: Switzerland
- Selection process: ESC 2018 – die Entscheidungsshow
- Selection date: 4 February 2018

Competing entry
- Song: "Stones"
- Artist: Zibbz
- Songwriters: Corinne "Co" Gfeller; Stee Gfeller; Laurell Barker

Placement
- Semi-final result: Failed to qualify (13th)

Participation chronology

Switzerland was represented at the Eurovision Song Contest 2018 with the song "Stones" written by Corinne "Coco" Gfeller, Stee Gfeller and Laurell Barker. The song was performed by the duo Zibbz. The Swiss entry for the 2018 contest in Lisbon, Portugal was selected through the national final ESC 2018 – die Entscheidungsshow, organised by the Swiss broadcaster Swiss Broadcasting Corporation (SRG SSR). Songwriters that were interested in entering the Swiss national final had the opportunity to apply during a submission period organised by SRG SSR. Six entries were selected to advance to the televised national final, and the six finalists performed during the national final on 4 February 2018 where a combination of international jury voting and public voting ultimately selected "Stones" performed by Zibbz as the winner.

Switzerland was drawn to compete in the first semi-final of the Eurovision Song Contest which took place on 8 May 2018. Performing during the show in position 17, "Stones" was not announced among the top 10 entries of the second semi-final and therefore did not qualify to compete in the final. It was later revealed that Switzerland placed thirteenth out of the 19 participating countries in the semi-final with 86 points.

== Background ==
Prior to the 2018 contest, Switzerland had participated in the Eurovision Song Contest fifty-eight times since its first entry in 1956. Switzerland is noted for having won the first edition of the Eurovision Song Contest with the song "Refrain" performed by Lys Assia. Their second and, to this point, most recent victory was achieved in 1988 when Canadian singer Céline Dion won the contest with the song "Ne partez pas sans moi". Following the introduction of semi-finals for the 2004, Switzerland had managed to participate in the final four times up to this point. In 2005, the internal selection of Estonian girl band Vanilla Ninja, performing the song "Cool Vibes", qualified Switzerland to the final where they placed 8th. Due to their successful result in 2005, Switzerland was pre-qualified to compete directly in the final in 2006. Between 2007 and 2010, the nation failed to qualify to the final after a string of internal selections. Since opting to organize a national final from 2011 onwards, Switzerland has managed to qualify to the final twice out of the last seven years. In 2017, Timebelle and their song "Apollo" failed to qualify Switzerland to the final placing 12th in their semi-final.

The Swiss national broadcaster, Swiss Broadcasting Corporation (SRG SSR), broadcasts the event within Switzerland and organises the selection process for the nation's entry. SRG SSR confirmed their intentions to participate at the 2018 Eurovision Song Contest on 30 June 2017. Along with their participation confirmation, the broadcaster also announced that the Swiss entry for the 2018 contest would be selected through a national final. Switzerland has selected their entry for the Eurovision Song Contest through both national finals and internal selections in the past. Between 2005 and 2010, the Swiss entry was internally selected for the competition. Since 2011, the broadcaster has opted to organize a national final in order to select their entry.

== Before Eurovision ==
=== ESC 2018 – die Entscheidungsshow ===
ESC 2018 – die Entscheidungsshow was the eighth and final edition of the Swiss national final format that selected Switzerland's entry for the Eurovision Song Contest 2018. The show took place on 4 February 2018 at the SRF Studio 1 in Zürich, hosted by Sven Epiney. The show was televised on SRF zwei, RSI La 2 with Italian commentary by Clarissa Tami and RTS Deux with French commentary by Nicolas Tanner and Jean-Marc Richard. The competition was also streamed online at the respective official website of each Swiss broadcaster.

==== Competing entries ====
SRG SSR opened a submission period between 1 September 2017 and 22 September 2017 for interested composers to submit their songs via an online platform. Songwriters of any nationality were able to submit songs; however those with a Swiss passport or residency were given priority. A songwriting camp was also held in Maur during which 18 songs were created and 16 of which were submitted for the competition. 670 entries were submitted following the submission deadline. A 20-member jury panel consisting of music and media experts, Eurovision fans and television viewers evaluated the received submissions and selected six songs, which were then tested by their music producers with various artists. The six artists and songs that qualified for the national final were announced on 9 January 2018.

Members of the Jury
Group	Members
Experts	Alizé Oswald – Singer; Barbara Berta – Singer, Swiss Eurovision Song Contest 1997 entrant; Bettina Bendiner – Journalist; Denise Vogel – Production Coordinator, 360° Show Production AG; Iris Moné – Singer, vocal coach; Laurent Pavia – Head of Music, Society and Culture, RTS; Léonard Gogniat – Singer; Michel Imhof – Journalist, Ringier/Blick; Peter Reber – Musician; Tanya Gavrancic – Music promoter, Siren Agency
Eurovision fans	Alain Pfammatter – Executive health consultant; Angela Grande – Market researcher; Florian Tusi – Service Specialist; Gian-Andri Paganini – PH student; Pascal Marchev – Webmaster
Television viewers	Cedric Cassimo – Artist; Igor Asner – Head of Marketing, Diagnostics Division; Renato Delcò – Student; Severin Marfurt – Medical student; Susanne Egloff – Lawyer

Competing entries
Artist	Song	Songwriter(s)
Alejandro Reyes	"Compass"	Alejandro Reyes, Laurell Barker, Lars Christen
Angie Ott	"A Thousand Times"	Jonas Gladnikoff, Sara Ljunggren, Glen Vella
Chiara Dubey	"Secrets and Lies"	Chiara Dubey, Janie Price, Jeroen Swinnen, Darcy Proper, Sally Herbert
Naeman	"Kiss Me"	Kate Northrop, Eric Lumiere, Ken Berglund, Alejandro Reyes
Vanessa Iraci	"Redlights"	Borislav Milanov, Joacim Bo Persson, Johan Alkenäs, Jessica Ashley Karpov, Jesse Saint John
Zibbz	"Stones"	Corinne "Coco" Gfeller, Stee Gfeller, Laurell Barker

==== Final ====
The final took place on 4 February 2018. The six candidate songs in contention to represent Switzerland were performed and the combination of televoting (50%) and the votes of seven international juries (50%) selected "Stones" performed by Zibbz as the winner. The viewers and the juries each had a total of 252 points to award. Each jury group distributed their points as follows: 6, 8, 10 and 12 points. The viewer vote was based on the percentage of votes each song achieved. For example, if a song gained 10% of the viewer vote, then that entry would be awarded 10% of 252 points rounded to the nearest integer: 25 points. In addition to the performances from the competing artists, Swiss Eurovision Song Contest 2017 entrants Timebelle opened the show with "Apollo", while singer Leticia Carvalho and the group Appenzeller Sängerfreunde performed the Portuguese Eurovision Song Contest 2017 winning song "Amar pelos dois" as the interval act.

Final – 4 February 2018
R/O	Artist	Song	Jury	Televote	Total	Place
1	Zibbz	"Stones"	76	77	153	1
2	Angie Ott	"A Thousand Times"	26	39	65	5
3	Naeman	"Kiss Me"	14	19	33	6
4	Chiara Dubey	"Secrets and Lies"	22	44	66	4
5	Alejandro Reyes	"Compass"	72	48	120	2
6	Vanessa Iraci	"Redlights"	42	25	67	3

Detailed International Jury Votes
R/O	Song	Albania	Armenia	France	Germany	Iceland	Israel	Italy	Total
R/O	Song	Albania	Armenia	France	Germany	Iceland	Israel	Italy	Total
1	"Stones"	12	8	10	10	12	12	12	76
2	"A Thousand Times"	6	6		8	6			26
3	"Kiss Me"				6			8	14
4	"Secrets and Lies"			6		8	8		22
5	"Compass"	8	10	12	12	10	10	10	72
6	"Redlights"	10	12	8			6	6	42
International Jury Spokespersons
Albania: Kleart Duraj; Armenia: David Tserunyan; France: Edoardo Grassi; Germany: Christoph Pellander; Iceland: Gísli Marteinn Baldursson; Israel: Tal Barnea; Italy: Nicola Caligiore

Members of the International Jury
Country	Members
Albania	Edmond Zhulali; Elton Deda; Klodian Qafoku; Sokol Marsi; Sonila Djepaxhia
Armenia	Artsvik Harutyunyan; Asatur Asatryan; Emma Asatryan; Gohar Gasparyan
France	Dumè; Enea; Margaux Savarit; Sebastien Barké
Germany	Mairena Torres Schuster; Markus Pingel; Nina Straube; Roman Rätzke; Stefan Spiegel
Iceland	Felix Bergsson; Hulda Geirsdóttir; Máni Svavarsson; Margrét Blöndal
Israel	Lev Liron; Litvin Eran; Pinto Goel; Shevach Meytal; Zel Chaya
Italy	Andrea Bonetti; Chiara di Gianbattista; Eddy Anselmi; Marta Cagnola

=== Promotion ===
Zibbz made several appearances across Europe to specifically promote "Stones" as the Swiss Eurovision entry. Between 8 and 11 April, Zibbz took part in promotional activities in Tel Aviv, Israel and performed during the Israel Calling event held at the Rabin Square. On 14 April, Zibbz performed during the Eurovision in Concert event which was held at the AFAS Live venue in Amsterdam, Netherlands and hosted by Edsilia Rombley and Cornald Maas. On 17 April, Zibbz performed during the London Eurovision Party, which was held at the Café de Paris venue in London, United Kingdom and hosted by Nicki French and Paddy O'Connell. On 21 April, Zibbz performed during the ESPreParty event on 21 April which was held at the Sala La Riviera venue in Madrid, Spain and hosted by Soraya Arnelas.

== At Eurovision ==
According to Eurovision rules, all nations with the exceptions of the host country and the "Big Five" (France, Germany, Italy, Spain and the United Kingdom) are required to qualify from one of two semi-finals in order to compete for the final; the top ten countries from each semi-final progress to the final. The European Broadcasting Union (EBU) split up the competing countries into six different pots based on voting patterns from previous contests, with countries with favourable voting histories put into the same pot. On 29 January 2018, a special allocation draw was held which placed each country into one of the two semi-finals, as well as which half of the show they would perform in. Switzerland was placed into the first semi-final, to be held on 8 May 2018, and was scheduled to perform in the second half of the show.

Once all the competing songs for the 2018 contest had been released, the running order for the semi-finals was decided by the shows' producers rather than through another draw, so that similar songs were not placed next to each other. Switzerland was set to perform in position 17, following the entry from Armenia and before the entry from Ireland.

In Switzerland, three broadcasters that form SRG SSR aired the contest. Sven Epiney provided German commentary for both semi-finals airing on SRF zwei and the final airing on SRF 1. Clarissa Tami provided Italian commentary for the semi-finals airing on RSI La 2 and the final airing on RSI La 1. Jean-Marc Richard and Nicolas Taner provided French commentary only for the final on RTS Un. The Swiss spokesperson, who announced the top 12-point score awarded by the Swiss jury during the final, was Letícia Carvalho.

=== Semi-final ===
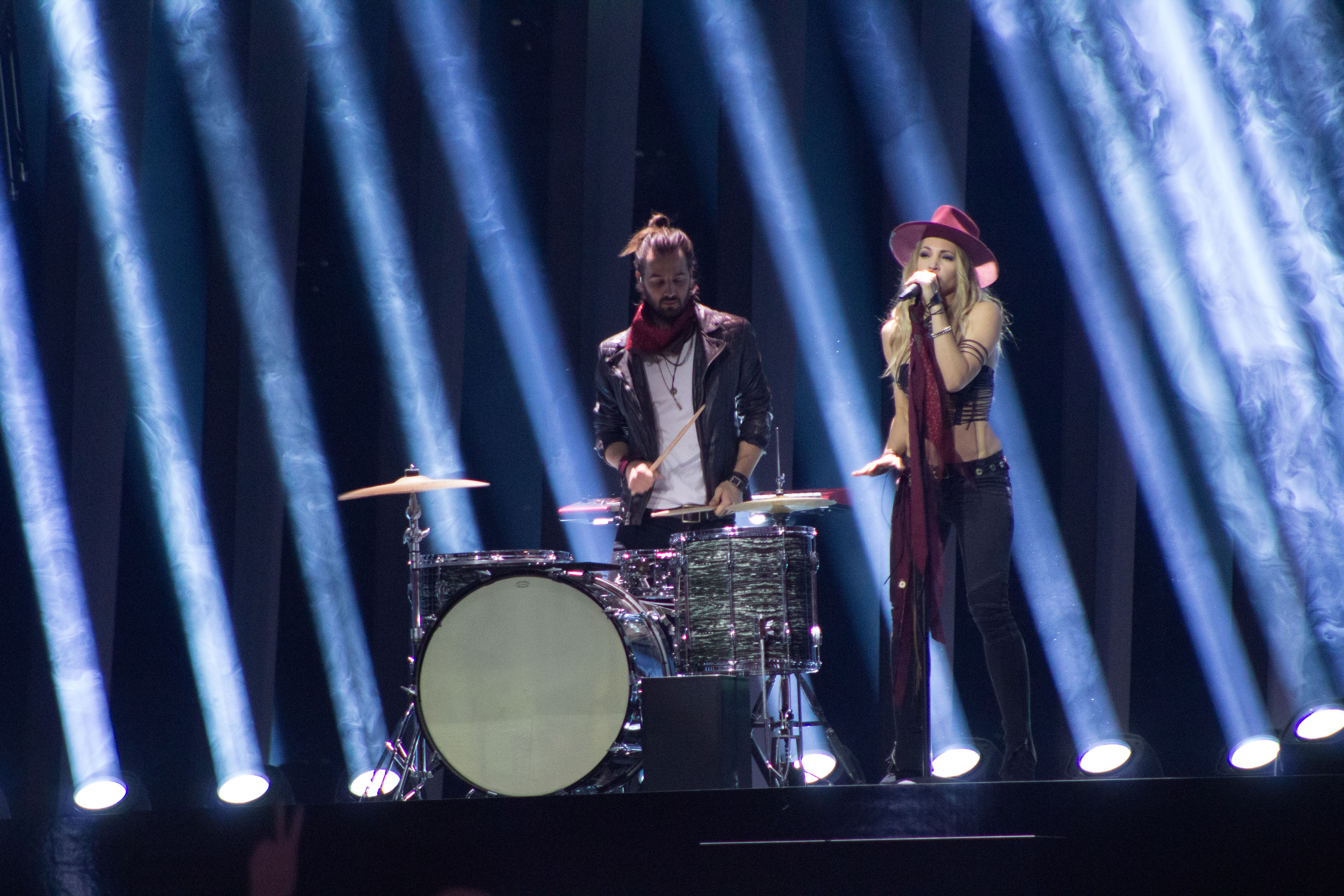
Zibbz during a rehearsal before the first semi-final

Zibbz took part in technical rehearsals on 29 April and 3 May, followed by dress rehearsals on 7 and 8 May. This included the jury show on 7 May where the professional juries of each country watched and voted on the competing entries.

The Swiss performance featured the members of Zibbz performing on stage; Corinne Gfeller wore a short top with strings, skinny jeans and a maroon hat while Stee Gfeller wore a leather jacket with a white shirt underneath. The performance began with the duo at the main stage on a podium, after which Corinne stepped off to make use of both bridges and outer ring of the stage. Before the final chorus, the duo both held flares with Corinne shouting "This is for everybody who has ever been hurt!" before walking back onto the main stage to conclude the performance. Zibbz was joined by three off-stage backing vocalists: the co-composer of "Stones" Laurell Barker, Nita Fernandes and Sabrina Kern.

At the end of the show, Switzerland was not announced among the top 10 entries in the first semi-final and therefore failed to qualify to compete in the final. It was later revealed that Switzerland placed thirteenth in the semi-final, receiving a total of 86 points: 27 points from the televoting and 59 points from the juries.

=== Voting ===
Voting during the three shows involved each country awarding two sets of points from 1-8, 10 and 12: one from their professional jury and the other from televoting. Each nation's jury consisted of five music industry professionals who are citizens of the country they represent, with their names published before the contest to ensure transparency. This jury judged each entry based on: vocal capacity; the stage performance; the song's composition and originality; and the overall impression by the act. In addition, no member of a national jury was permitted to be related in any way to any of the competing acts in such a way that they cannot vote impartially and independently. The individual rankings of each jury member as well as the nation's televoting results were released shortly after the grand final.

Below is a breakdown of points awarded to Switzerland and awarded by Switzerland in the first semi-final and grand final of the contest, and the breakdown of the jury voting and televoting conducted during the two shows:

==== Points awarded to Switzerland ====
Points awarded to Switzerland (Semi-final 1)
Score	Televote	Jury
12 points		
10 points		
8 points	Austria	Belgium; Israel
7 points		
6 points		Czech Republic; Lithuania
5 points		Croatia; Spain
4 points	Finland	United Kingdom
3 points	Portugal	Armenia; Azerbaijan; Iceland; Ireland
2 points	Croatia; Estonia; Iceland; Ireland	Albania
1 point	Albania; Israel; Macedonia; Spain	Austria; Finland; Greece

==== Points awarded by Switzerland ====
Points awarded by Switzerland (Semi-final 1)
Score	Televote	Jury
12 points	Austria	Estonia
10 points	Albania	Ireland
8 points	Israel	Czech Republic
7 points	Cyprus	Lithuania
6 points	Ireland	Austria
5 points	Finland	Israel
4 points	Croatia	Cyprus
3 points	Czech Republic	Bulgaria
2 points	Greece	Finland
1 point	Estonia	Iceland

Points awarded by Switzerland (Final)
Score	Televote	Jury
12 points	Serbia	Germany
10 points	Portugal	Estonia
8 points	Italy	Lithuania
7 points	Albania	Cyprus
6 points	Germany	Ireland
5 points	Israel	Sweden
4 points	Austria	Austria
3 points	Cyprus	Portugal
2 points	Denmark	Bulgaria
1 point	Spain	Israel

==== Detailed voting results ====
The following members comprised the Swiss jury:

- Georg Schlunegger (jury chairperson) – producer, songwriter
- Alizé Oswald – singer
- Michael Kinzer – boardmember of Swiss Music Export and Fondation pour la Chanson et les Musiques Actuelles
- Eva Bellomo – singer
- Nicola Kneringer (Nickless) – singer

Detailed voting results from Switzerland (Semi-final 1)
R/O	Country	Jury							Televote	
R/O	Country	G. Schlunegger	A. Oswald	M. Kinzer	E. Bellomo	Nickless	Rank	Points	Rank	Points
01	Azerbaijan	9	17	17	16	17	16		15	
02	Iceland	10	9	5	5	13	10	1	16	
03	Albania	8	12	12	9	16	13		2	10
04	Belgium	13	11	15	11	11	14		14	
05	Czech Republic	18	3	3	1	7	3	8	8	3
06	Lithuania	5	8	1	10	3	4	7	12	
07	Israel	4	1	6	12	14	6	5	3	8
08	Belarus	16	15	14	15	15	17		18	
09	Estonia	1	2	9	3	2	1	12	10	1
10	Bulgaria	14	5	7	6	5	8	3	13	
11	Macedonia	17	18	18	18	18	18		11	
12	Croatia	11	16	13	8	8	12		7	4
13	Austria	3	4	10	2	9	5	6	1	12
14	Greece	15	14	16	14	12	15		9	2
15	Finland	7	10	4	7	10	9	2	6	5
16	Armenia	12	13	11	13	6	11		17	
17	Switzerland									
18	Ireland	2	6	8	4	1	2	10	5	6
19	Cyprus	6	7	2	17	4	7	4	4	7

Detailed voting results from Switzerland (Final)
R/O	Country	Jury							Televote	
R/O	Country	G. Schlunegger	A. Oswald	M. Kinzer	E. Bellomo	Nickless	Rank	Points	Rank	Points
01	Ukraine	25	20	24	24	26	26		25	
02	Spain	15	16	14	14	13	20		10	1
03	Slovenia	22	22	11	21	4	12		26	
04	Lithuania	3	7	2	4	5	3	8	20	
05	Austria	5	6	9	3	14	7	4	7	4
06	Estonia	1	12	4	2	3	2	10	18	
07	Norway	20	11	19	5	16	14		22	
08	Portugal	9	3	8	25	9	8	3	2	10
09	United Kingdom	18	13	21	6	12	16		16	
10	Serbia	23	19	26	13	25	23		1	12
11	Germany	2	1	15	1	7	1	12	5	6
12	Albania	16	18	17	15	21	21		4	7
13	France	21	8	13	11	17	17		11	
14	Czech Republic	26	10	6	10	19	11		13	
15	Denmark	17	26	12	26	18	22		9	2
16	Australia	8	21	25	12	22	18		17	
17	Finland	10	23	5	16	20	13		21	
18	Bulgaria	14	14	3	7	10	9	2	24	
19	Moldova	19	25	22	22	24	25		19	
20	Sweden	4	9	16	19	1	6	5	23	
21	Hungary	24	24	20	23	15	24		14	
22	Israel	13	2	7	17	23	10	1	6	5
23	Netherlands	11	17	23	18	11	19		15	
24	Ireland	7	4	10	8	2	5	6	12	
25	Cyprus	6	5	1	20	6	4	7	8	3
26	Italy	12	15	18	9	8	15		3	8
