= Andy Platon =

- Born: Eduard-Andrei Platon; Romania
- Occupations: Record producer, songwriter
- Years active: 2009–present

Andy Platon (born Eduard-Andrei Platon) is a Romanian record producer and songwriter.

== Career ==
Platon gained recognition as part of the production team Kazibo Music. In 2015, the team received the "Best Producer" award at the Media Music Awards, one of Romania's primary music galas.

In 2015, Platon launched the project "Soundland", releasing the single "Atat de usor" featuring Alexandra Ungureanu. He continued working with Ungureanu on additional tracks including "Intinderi de nori".

In 2016, Platon co-wrote and featured on "Facedown" by German trance producer Markus Schulz, which appeared on Schulz's album Watch the World. He established a creative partnership with Swiss-Romanian band Timebelle, producing their 2019 single "Movin' On". His work has charted in German-speaking territories; "Back Home" (with Gino Manzotti and Maxx) received coverage on German dance charts.

Platon has also produced for DJ Project, including the hit singles "Parte din tine" featuring Roxen and "La timpul lor" featuring Emaa.

In 2019, Platon was appointed as a jury member for the Selecția Națională, the Eurovision Song Contest national selection for Romania. The semi-finals he judged attracted over 280,000 viewers.

== Discography ==
=== Selected production and songwriting credits ===
Year	Title	Artist	Role	Notes
2015	"Atât de ușor"	Soundland feat. Alexandra Ungureanu	Producer, Artist	
2015	"Save Me"	Listenbee feat. Naz Tokio	Producer, Composer	
2015	"Falava"	Naguale x Andra	Producer	
2015	"Și îngerii au demonii lor"	Dan Bittman	Producer	
2016	"Facedown"	Markus Schulz feat. Soundland	Songwriter, Featured Artist	Album: Watch the World
2017	"Întinderi de nori"	Soundland feat. Alexandra Ungureanu	Producer, Artist	
2017	"Apollo"	Timebelle	Engineer (Immersive Mixing)	
2017	"Cămașa"	Lidia Buble	Producer	
2017	"Jordans"	Jacob Sartorius	Producer	
2019	"Movin' On"	Timebelle & Soundland	Producer, Artist	
2021	"Back Home"	Gino Manzotti x Maxx & Soundland	Producer, Artist	
2021	"Cheia inimii mele"	DJ Project x Mira	Songwriter, Producer	
2021	"Parte din tine"	DJ Project x Roxen	Songwriter, Producer	Major Romanian hit (tens of millions of streams/views)
2022	"La timpul lor"	DJ Project x Emaa	Songwriter, Producer	
2024	"Now We Are Free"	Blasterjaxx & Gabry Ponte	Vocal Producer	
2024	"Rush of Blood"	Rag'n'Bone Man	Recording, Mixing, Mastering Engineer	
2024	"Wendo"	Grooveboy, Mindblow & Soundland	Producer, Artist	
2024	"Real Love"	Mindblow & Soundland feat. Sam Heselwood	Producer	
2024	"Fading Out To Black"	Mindblow & Soundland feat. Sam Heselwood	Producer	
2025	"Pe pământ"	DJ Project feat. Francis On My Mind	Producer	
2025	"Lie To Me"	Mindblow & Soundland	Producer, Artist	
2025	"corazón (Soundland & Stenzel Remix)"	Olivia Wald	Remixer, Producer	
2025	"Feels Like Ghosts (Remix)"	Pardyalone, Soundland & Stenzel	Remixer, Producer	
2025	"Halfway Love (Remix)"	Max Frost, Soundland & Stenzel	Remixer, Producer	
2025	"Tears Dry Tonight"	Cyril x James Blunt	Vocal Producer, Recording Engineer	
2025	Live at Montreux Jazz Festival 2023	Iggy Pop	Mixing, Mastering	Album
2025	Iscelyu	Valeriya	Producer, Recording, Mixing, Mastering	Album

== Awards ==
- Media Music Awards 2015: Best Producer (as part of Kazibo Music)
- The Artist Awards: Nominations in industry categories
- Radio Romania Music Awards: Nominations for produced works
