= Switzerland in the Eurovision Song Contest 2017 =

- Eurovision Song Contest 2017
- Participating broadcaster: Swiss Broadcasting Corporation (SRG SSR)
- Country: Switzerland
- Selection process: ESC 2017 – die Entscheidungsshow
- Selection date: 5 February 2017

Competing entry
- Song: "Apollo"
- Artist: Timebelle
- Songwriters: Elias Näslin; Nicolas Günthardt; Alessandra Günthardt

Placement
- Semi-final result: Failed to qualify (12th)

Participation chronology

Switzerland was represented at the Eurovision Song Contest 2017 with the song "Apollo", written by Elias Näslin, Nicolas Günthardt, and Alessandra Günthardt, and performed by the band Timebelle. The Swiss participating broadcaster, the Swiss Broadcasting Corporation (SRG SSR), selected its entry for the contest through the national final ESC 2017 – die Entscheidungsshow. Artists that were interested in entering the Swiss national final had the opportunity to apply during a submission period organised by SRG SSR. A total of 21 entries were selected to advance to an "Live Check" round held on 4 December 2016 and involved nineteen experts evaluating the live performances of the 21 entries and selecting six entries to advance to the televised national final. The six finalists performed during the national final on 5 February 2017 where public voting ultimately selected "Apollo" performed by Timebelle as the winner.

Switzerland was drawn to compete in the second semi-final of the Eurovision Song Contest which took place on 11 May 2017. Performing during the show in position 13, "Apollo" was not announced among the top 10 entries of the second semi-final and therefore did not qualify to compete in the final. It was later revealed that Switzerland placed twelfth out of the 18 participating countries in the semi-final with 97 points.

== Background ==
Prior to the 2017 contest, the Swiss Broadcasting Corporation (SRG SSR) had participated in the Eurovision Song Contest representing Switzerland fifty-seven times since its first entry in 1956. It won that first edition of the contest with the song "Refrain" performed by Lys Assia. Its second victory was achieved in 1988 with the song "Ne partez pas sans moi" performed by Canadian singer Céline Dion. Following the introduction of semi-finals for the 2004 contest, it had managed to participate in the final four times up to this point. In 2005, the internal selection of Estonian girl band Vanilla Ninja, performing the song "Cool Vibes", qualified Switzerland to the final where they placed 8th. Due to their successful result in 2005, Switzerland was pre-qualified to compete directly in the final in 2006. Between 2007 and 2010, they failed to qualify to the final after a string of internal selections. Since opting to organize a national final from 2011 onwards, Switzerland has managed to qualify to the final twice out of the last six years. In 2016, "The Last of Our Kind" performed by Rykka earned one of the lowest results for Switzerland of all time, placing last in their semi-final earning only 2 points.

As part of its duties as participating broadcaster, SRG SSR organises the selection of its entry in the Eurovision Song Contest and broadcasts the event in the country. The broadcaster confirmed its intentions to participate at the 2017 contest on 18 May 2016. On 15 June 2016, SRG SSR also announced that its entry for the 2017 contest would be selected through a national final. The broadcaster has selected its entry for the Eurovision Song Contest through both national finals and internal selections in the past. Between 2005 and 2010, the entry was internally selected for the competition. Since 2011, it has opted to organize a national final in order to select its entry.

== Before Eurovision ==
=== ESC 2017 – die Entscheidungsshow ===
ESC 2017 – die Entscheidungsshow was the seventh edition of the Swiss national final format organised by SRG SSR to select its entry for the Eurovision Song Contest 2017. The show took place on 5 February 2017 at the SRF Studio 1 in Zürich, hosted by Sven Epiney and was televised on SRF zwei, RSI La 2 with Italian commentary by Clarissa Tami and Nicola Locarnini, and RTS Deux with French commentary by Nicolas Tanner and Jean-Marc Richard. The competition was also streamed online at the respective official website of each Swiss broadcaster.

==== Selection process ====
The selection process took place in three stages before the finalists for the live show and ultimately the winner are selected. The first stage of the competition involved an online platform where all interested artists could submit their songs without having them listed for public listening. This saw the end to the individual broadcasters each conducting varying selections in order to determine the candidates for the competition. The second stage was a Live Check (formerly titled Expert Check) audition where shortlisted candidates performed the songs and a jury panel selected six artists and songs to proceed to the third stage, the televised national final, where the winning artist and song was selected to represent Switzerland in Kyiv. The jury panel involved in the selection were required to have the following member quotas representing the different language regions in Switzerland: 68% German/Romansh, 23% French and 9% Italian.

==== Competing entries ====
SRG SSR opened a submission period between 26 September 2016 and 24 October 2016 for interested artists and composers to submit their entries via an online platform. A new regulation underscored that the entries must have a link to Switzerland, meaning that at least one person (the performer, composer, or lyricist) were required to have a Swiss passport or be a resident in Switzerland. 160 entries were submitted following the submission deadline. A 19-member jury panel evaluated the received submissions between 31 October 2016 and 14 November 2016 and selected 21 candidates that proceeded to the "Live Check". The jury consisted of:

- Gülsha Adilji – Journalist and presenter
- Bettina Bendiner – Head of the Entertainment Department, 20 Minuten
- Roman Camenzind – Music producer
- Camille Destraz - Music journalist
- Beppe Donadio – Musician and journalist
- Freda Goodlett – Vocal coach
- Michael Kinzer – Swiss Music Prize jury president
- Pascal Künzi – General Manager, Musikvertrieb
- Nicola Locarnini – Musician
- Simone Reich – Television magazine journalist, Ringier Axel Springer Schweiz AG
- Jocelyn Rochat - Music journalist
- Oliver Rosa – Swiss Music Awards organiser and artist manager
- Yves Schifferle – Programme development SRF Entertainment
- Lina Selmani – Chief editor, watson.ch
- Dano Tamásy – Music editor, Radio SRF 3 Best Talent
- Christoph Trummer - President, Musikschaffende Schweiz
- Flavio Tuor – Music editor, RTR
- Denise Vogel - Production Coordinator, 360° Show Production AG
- Sébastien Vuignier – Director, TAKK Productions

The "Live Check" took place on 4 December 2016 where the 21 selected candidates performed their songs in front of the jury panel which assessed the performers on criteria such as live performance skills, voice quality and stage presence. The six artists and songs that qualified for the national final were announced on 5 December 2016.

==== Final ====
The final took place on 5 February 2017. The six candidate songs in contention to represent Switzerland were performed and televoting solely selected "Apollo" performed by Timebelle as the winner. The singer Ginta presented for the first time on a Swiss television channel, an outstanding performance in Augmented Reality In addition to the performances from the competing entries, Sebalter, who represented Switzerland in 2014, performed his song "Weeping Willow" as the interval act.

Final – 5 February 2017
R/O	Artist	Song	Songwriter(s)	Televote	Place
1	Nadya	"The Fire in the Sky"	Ricardo Sanz	18.02%	2
2	Ginta Biku	"Cet air là"	Johan Czerneski, Daniel Kromo Kromolowski, Gintarė Kubiliūtė, LIM	8.31%	4
3	Michèle	"Two Faces"	Laura Kloos, Hermann Niesig, Nils Brunkhorst, Michèle Bircher	11.44%	3
4	Freschta	"Gold"	Iris Bösiger, Christoph Bauss, Christopher Heath, Simon Adrian, Freschta Akbarzada	6.79%	6
5	Shana Pearson	"Exodus"	Denniz Jamm, Andreas Stone Johansson, Mahan Moin	7.56%	5
6	Timebelle	"Apollo"	Elias Näslin, Nicolas Günthardt, Alessandra Günthardt	47.88%	1

=== Promotion ===
Timebelle made several appearances across Europe to specifically promote "Apollo" as the Swiss Eurovision entry. Between 3 and 6 April, Timebelle took part in promotional activities in Tel Aviv, Israel where they performed during the Israel Calling event held at the Ha'teatron venue. On 8 April, Timebelle performed during the Eurovision in Concert event which was held at the Melkweg venue in Amsterdam, Netherlands and hosted by Cornald Maas and Selma Björnsdóttir. On 15 April, Timebelle performed during the Eurovision Spain Pre-Party, which was held at the Sala La Riviera venue in Madrid, Spain.

== At Eurovision ==
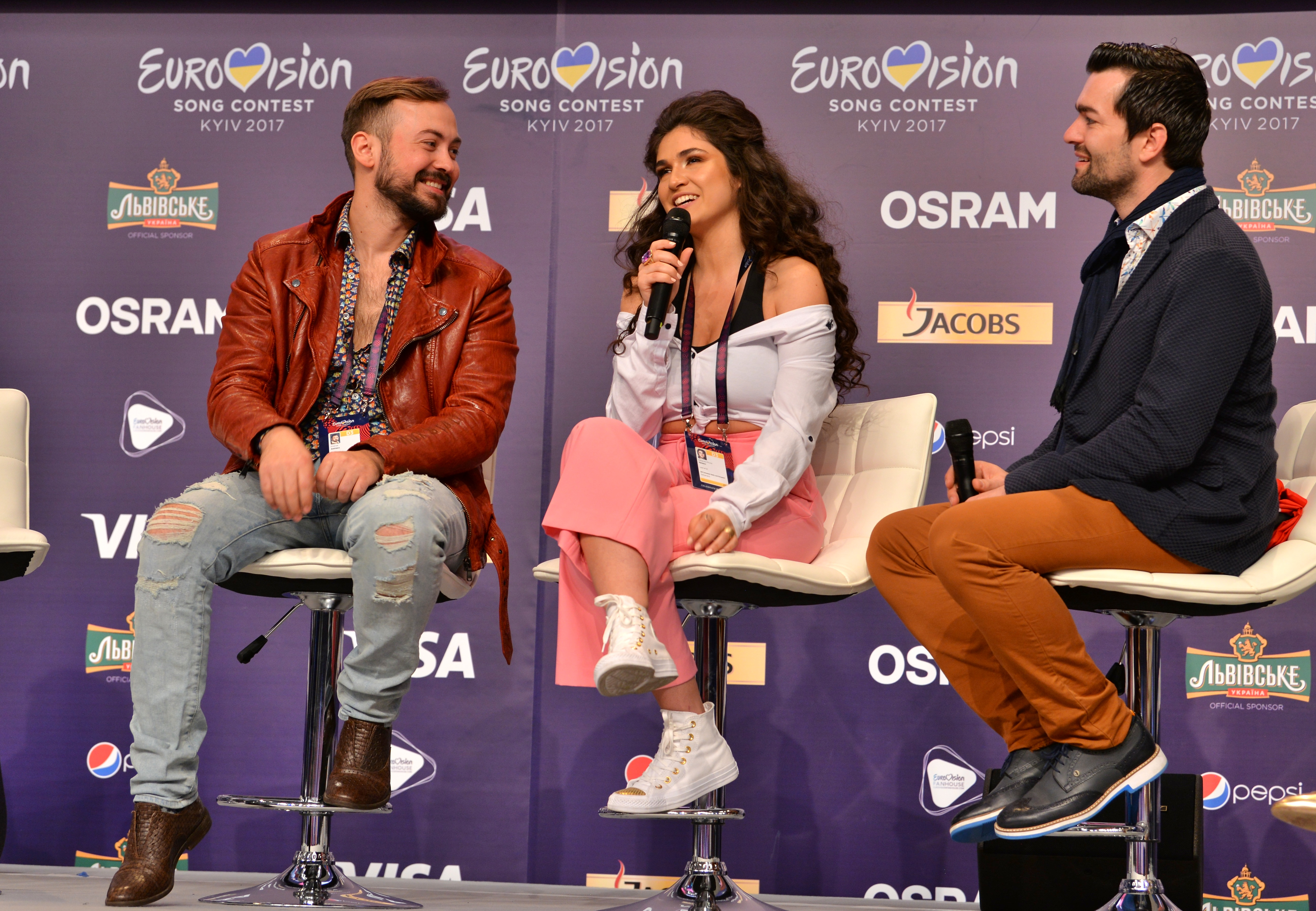
Timebelle during a press meet and greet

According to Eurovision rules, all nations with the exceptions of the host country and the "Big Five" (France, Germany, Italy, Spain and the United Kingdom) are required to qualify from one of two semi-finals in order to compete for the final; the top ten countries from each semi-final progress to the final. The European Broadcasting Union (EBU) split up the competing countries into six different pots based on voting patterns from previous contests, with countries with favourable voting histories put into the same pot. On 31 January 2017, a special allocation draw was held which placed each country into one of the two semi-finals, as well as which half of the show they would perform in. Switzerland was placed into the second semi-final, to be held on 11 May 2017, and was scheduled to perform in the second half of the show.

Once all the competing songs for the 2017 contest had been released, the running order for the semi-finals was decided by the shows' producers rather than through another draw, so that similar songs were not placed next to each other. Originally, Switzerland was set to perform in position 14, following the entry from Norway and before the entry from Belarus. But after Russia was removed from the running order of the competition following their withdrawal from the contest, Switzerland's position shifted to 13.

In Switzerland, three broadcasters that form SRG SSR aired the contest. Sven Epiney provided German commentary for both semi-finals airing on SRF zwei and the final airing on SRF 1. Jean-Marc Richard and Nicolas Tanner provided French commentary for the semi-finals on RTS Deux and the final on RTS Un. Clarissa Tami and Sebalter provided Italian commentary for the semi-finals on RSI La 2 and the final on RSI La 1. SRG SSR appointed Luca Hänni, who would go on to represent Switzerland in 2019, as its spokesperson to announced the top 12-point score awarded by the Swiss jury during the final.

=== Semi-finals ===
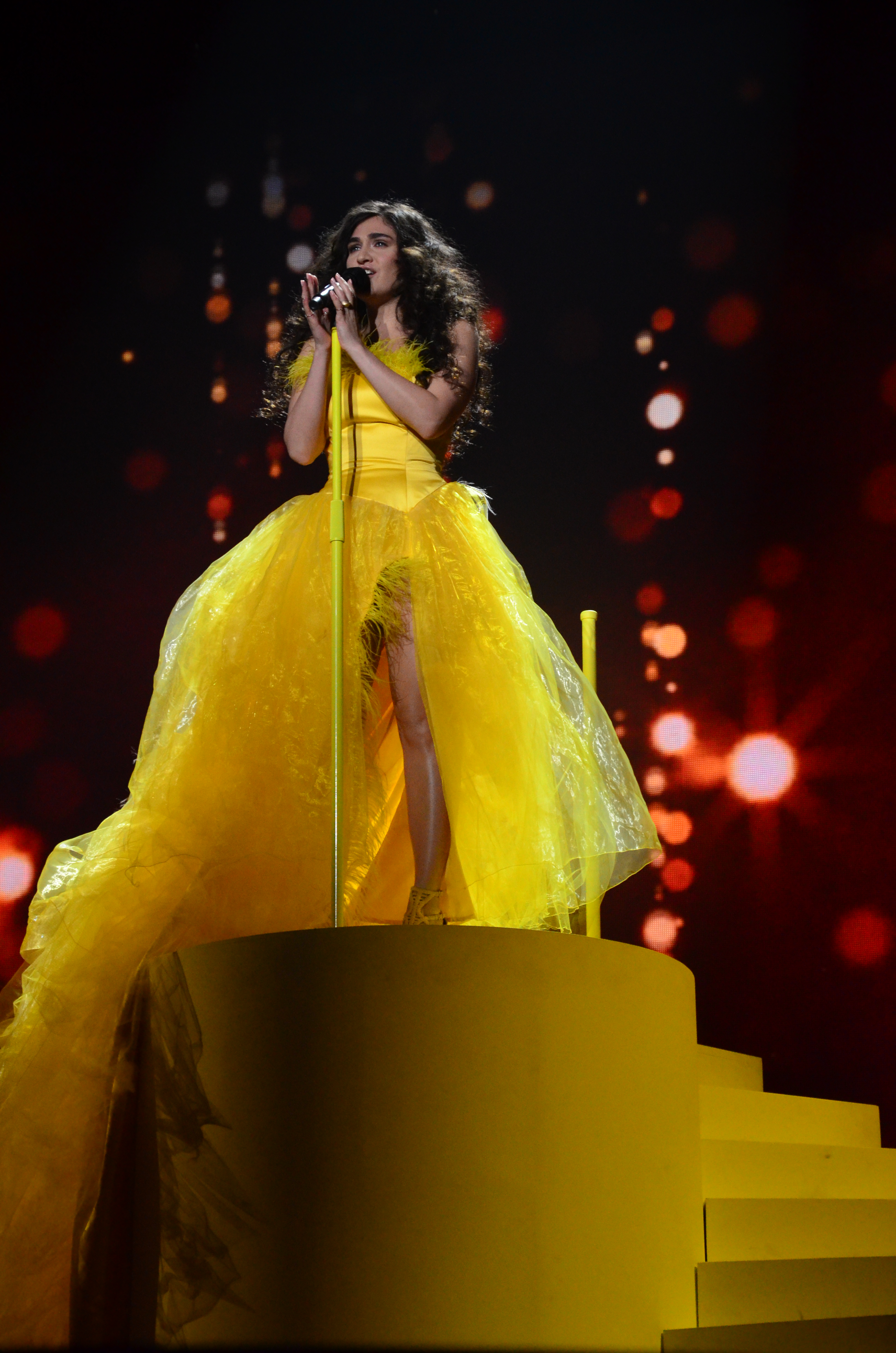
Timebelle during a rehearsal before the second semi-final

Timebelle took part in technical rehearsals on 2 April and 6 May, followed by dress rehearsals on 10 and 11 May. This included the jury show on 10 May where the professional juries of each country watched and voted on the competing entries.

The Swiss performance featured the members of Timebelle performing on stage; Miruna Mănescu was in a yellow dress while Emanuel Daniel Andriescu and Samuel Forster both wore white shirts with pink waistcoats. The performance began with Mănescu on a tall platform before descending the stairs to join the other band members on the stage floor for the final chorus. The stage colours were blue, pink and yellow with the LED screens displaying Greek statue heads. Timebelle was joined by three off-stage backing vocalists: Nori Rickenbacher, Nyssina Swerissen and Tanja Dankner.

At the end of the show, Switzerland was not announced among the top 10 entries in the second semi-final and therefore failed to qualify to compete in the final. It was later revealed that Switzerland placed twelfth in the semi-final, receiving a total of 97 points: 49 points from the televoting and 48 points from the juries.

=== Voting ===
Voting during the three shows involved each country awarding two sets of points from 1–8, 10 and 12: one from their professional jury and the other from televoting. Each nation's jury consisted of five music industry professionals who are citizens of the country they represent, with their names published before the contest to ensure transparency. This jury judged each entry based on: vocal capacity; the stage performance; the song's composition and originality; and the overall impression by the act. In addition, no member of a national jury was permitted to be related in any way to any of the competing acts in such a way that they cannot vote impartially and independently. The individual rankings of each jury member as well as the nation's televoting results were released shortly after the grand final.

Below is a breakdown of points awarded to Switzerland and awarded by Switzerland in the second semi-final and grand final of the contest, and the breakdown of the jury voting and televoting conducted during the two shows:

==== Points awarded to Switzerland ====
Points awarded to Switzerland (Semi-final 2)
Score	Televote	Jury
12 points		
10 points	Romania	
8 points		Ireland
7 points		Lithuania
6 points		Romania
5 points	Macedonia; Malta; San Marino	Norway
4 points	Bulgaria; France; Serbia	Austria; Denmark; Netherlands
3 points		Bulgaria; Estonia
2 points	Austria; Belarus; Israel; Ukraine	Germany
1 point	Croatia; Denmark; Hungary; Lithuania	Israel; Macedonia

==== Points awarded by Switzerland ====
Points awarded by Switzerland (Semi-final 2)
Score	Televote	Jury
12 points	Serbia	Bulgaria
10 points	Croatia	Norway
8 points	Hungary	Netherlands
7 points	Romania	Austria
6 points	Bulgaria	Serbia
5 points	Israel	Hungary
4 points	Netherlands	Israel
3 points	Macedonia	Denmark
2 points	Austria	Ireland
1 point	Estonia	Belarus

Points awarded by Switzerland (Final)
Score	Televote	Jury
12 points	Portugal	Portugal
10 points	Italy	Sweden
8 points	Croatia	Bulgaria
7 points	Belgium	Netherlands
6 points	Bulgaria	Belgium
5 points	Hungary	Norway
4 points	Romania	Australia
3 points	Germany	Hungary
2 points	France	Italy
1 point	Sweden	France

==== Detailed voting results ====
The following members comprised the Swiss jury:

- Michael von der Heide (jury chairperson) – singer, actor, musician, represented Switzerland in 2010
- Pele Loriano – songwriter, producer, session musician
- Daniela Simons – singer, represented Switzerland in 1986
- Anna Känzig – singer, songwriter
- Jean-Marie Fontana – artist, A&R consultant

Detailed voting results from Switzerland (Semi-final 2)
R/O	Country	Jury							Televote	
R/O	Country	M. von der Heide	P. Loriano	D. Simons	A. Känzig	J-M. Fontana	Rank	Points	Rank	Points
01	Serbia	10	7	6	5	5	5	6	1	12
02	Austria	6	8	2	10	4	4	7	9	2
03	Macedonia	12	3	16	14	9	11		8	3
04	Malta	14	9	15	4	12	12		14	
05	Romania	13	16	17	11	14	16		4	7
06	Netherlands	4	5	1	2	8	3	8	7	4
07	Hungary	9	11	3	6	7	6	5	3	8
08	Denmark	11	6	4	8	10	8	3	15	
09	Ireland	7	10	11	9	6	9	2	12	
10	San Marino	16	15	9	17	16	17		16	
11	Croatia	17	13	5	13	17	14		2	10
12	Norway	1	2	10	3	1	2	10	13	
13	Switzerland									
14	Belarus	5	14	12	7	13	10	1	11	
15	Bulgaria	3	1	8	1	2	1	12	5	6
16	Lithuania	8	17	7	16	11	13		17	
17	Estonia	15	12	14	12	15	15		10	1
18	Israel	2	4	13	15	3	7	4	6	5

Detailed voting results from Switzerland (Final)
R/O	Country	Jury							Televote	
R/O	Country	M. von der Heide	P. Loriano	D. Simons	A. Känzig	J-M. Fontana	Rank	Points	Rank	Points
01	Israel	7	18	14	15	11	13		17	
02	Poland	20	10	11	14	24	18		15	
03	Belarus	14	19	20	8	7	14		21	
04	Austria	12	12	6	19	16	12		14	
05	Armenia	16	13	18	18	22	20		22	
06	Netherlands	4	11	2	5	8	4	7	12	
07	Moldova	13	14	8	24	12	16		11	
08	Hungary	6	16	3	4	18	8	3	6	5
09	Italy	11	9	19	17	3	9	2	2	10
10	Denmark	21	20	9	10	19	17		26	
11	Portugal	1	3	1	6	5	1	12	1	12
12	Azerbaijan	17	23	24	20	21	21		25	
13	Croatia	26	25	12	26	20	24		3	8
14	Australia	9	5	5	11	15	7	4	13	
15	Greece	24	22	21	23	23	25		16	
16	Spain	23	21	25	22	17	22		23	
17	Norway	2	7	10	3	9	6	5	18	
18	United Kingdom	15	6	15	13	14	11		20	
19	Cyprus	19	15	13	25	13	19		19	
20	Romania	25	26	26	21	26	26		7	4
21	Germany	18	8	23	9	10	15		8	3
22	Ukraine	22	24	22	16	25	23		24	
23	Belgium	8	1	16	2	4	5	6	4	7
24	Sweden	3	2	4	7	1	2	10	10	1
25	Bulgaria	5	4	7	1	2	3	8	5	6
26	France	10	17	17	12	6	10	1	9	2
