= Ireland in the Eurovision Song Contest 2018 =

- Eurovision Song Contest 2018
- Participating broadcaster: Raidió Teilifís Éireann (RTÉ)
- Country: Ireland
- Selection process: Internal selection
- Announcement date: Artist: 31 January 2018; Song: 9 March 2018

Competing entry
- Song: "Together"
- Artist: Ryan O'Shaughnessy
- Songwriters: Ryan O'Shaughnessy; Mark Caplice; Laura Elizabeth Hughes

Placement
- Semi-final result: Qualified (6th, 179 points)
- Final result: 16th, 136 points

Participation chronology

Ireland was represented at the Eurovision Song Contest 2018 with the song "Together", written by Ryan O'Shaughnessy, Mark Caplice, and Laura Elizabeth Hughes, and performed by O'Shaughnessy himself. The Irish participating broadcaster, Raidió Teilifís Éireann (RTÉ), internally selected its entry for the contest. O'Shaughnessy's internal selection was announced on 31 January 2018, while "Together" was presented on 9 March 2018.

Ireland was drawn to compete in the first semi-final of the Eurovision Song Contest which took place on 8 May 2018. Performing during the show in position 18, "Together" was announced among the top 10 entries of the first semi-final and therefore qualified to compete in the final on 12 May. It was later revealed that Ireland placed sixth out of the 19 participating countries in the semi-final with 179 points. In the final, Ireland performed in position 24 and placed sixteenth out of the 26 participating countries, scoring 136 points.

== Background ==
Prior to the 2018 contest, Raidió Teilifís Éireann (RTÉ) and its predecessor national broadcasters have participated in the Eurovision Song Contest representing Ireland fifty times since RÉ's first entry in 1965. They have won the contest a record seven times in total. Their first win came in 1970, with "All Kinds of Everything" performed by Dana. Ireland holds the record for being the only country to win the contest three times in a row (in 1992, 1993, and 1994), as well as having the only three-time winner (Johnny Logan, who won in 1980 as a singer, 1987 as a singer-songwriter, and again in 1992 as a songwriter). The Irish entries since 2014 all failed to qualify to the final, including in 2017 with "Dying to Try" performed by Brendan Murray.

As part of its duties as participating broadcaster, RTÉ organises the selection of its entry in the Eurovision Song Contest and broadcasts the event in the country. The broadcaster confirmed its intentions to participate at the 2018 contest on 4 August 2017. From 2008 to 2015, RTÉ had set up the national final Eurosong to choose both the song and performer to compete at Eurovision for Ireland, with both the public and regional jury groups involved in the selection. In 2016 and 2017, RTÉ held an internal selection to choose the artist and song. For the 2018 contest, RTÉ internally selected both the artist and song.

== Before Eurovision ==
=== Internal selection ===
RTÉ opened a submission period on 14 September 2017 where artists and composers "with a proven track record of success in the music industry" were able to submit their entries until 6 November 2017. In addition to the public submissions, RTÉ reserved the right to approach established artists and composers to submit entries and to match songs with different artists to the ones who submitted an entry. At the closing of the deadline, over 300 entries were received and ten were shortlisted in early January 2018 after all of the submissions were reviewed.

On 31 January 2018, RTÉ announced that they had internally selected Ryan O'Shaughnessy to represent Ireland in Lisbon, performing the song "Together". "Together" was written by O'Shaughnessy himself together with Mark Caplice and Laura Elizabeth Hughes, and was selected by a jury panel consisting of music industry professionals appointed by RTÉ. The song was released on 9 March 2018 via a music video uploaded on YouTube. O'Shaughnessy's first live performance of the song took place on 9 April, during the RTÉ One Friday night programme The Late Late Show.

As one of three songwriters on "Together", I'm delighted it has been chosen to represent Ireland in Eurovision 2018, and on top of that, to be asked to perform for my country is an absolute honour. I plan on doing Ireland proud by bringing a song and performance to Eurovision that we haven't seen since the days of "Rock and Roll Kids". I can't wait to get onto that stage and perform an honest piece for millions of people.

— Ryan O'Shaughnessy

=== Promotion ===
Ryan O'Shaughnessy made several appearances across Europe to specifically promote "Together" as the Irish Eurovision entry. On 5 April, O'Shaughnessy performed during the London Eurovision Party, which was held at the Café de Paris venue in London, United Kingdom and hosted by Nicki French and Paddy O'Connell. Between 8 and 11 April, O'Shaughnessy took part in promotional activities in Tel Aviv, Israel and performed during the Israel Calling event held at the Rabin Square. On 14 April, O'Shaughnessy performed during the Eurovision in Concert event which was held at the AFAS Live venue in Amsterdam, Netherlands and hosted by Edsilia Rombley and Cornald Maas. On 21 April, O'Shaughnessy performed during the ESPreParty event which was held at the Sala La Riviera venue in Madrid, Spain and hosted by Soraya Arnelas. O'Shaughnessy was also one of the guest performers of 2018 Finnish contestant Saara Aalto's Eurovision Wonderland Live concert, which was held on 25 April at the Under the Bridge venue in London, United Kingdom.

In addition to his international appearances, Ryan O'Shaughnessy also completed promotional appearances in Ireland where he appeared on and performed during the RTÉ Radio 1 programme The Ray D'Arcy Show on 28 April.

== At Eurovision ==
According to Eurovision rules, all nations with the exceptions of the host country and the "Big Five" (France, Germany, Italy, Spain and the United Kingdom) are required to qualify from one of two semi-finals in order to compete for the final; the top ten countries from each semi-final progress to the final. The European Broadcasting Union (EBU) split up the competing countries into six different pots based on voting patterns from previous contests, with countries with favourable voting histories put into the same pot. On 29 January 2018, an allocation draw was held which placed each country into one of the two semi-finals, as well as which half of the show they would perform in. Ireland was placed into the first semi-final, to be held on 8 May 2018, and was scheduled to perform in the second half of the show.

Once all the competing songs for the 2018 contest had been released, the running order for the semi-finals was decided by the shows' producers rather than through another draw, so that similar songs were not placed next to each other. Ireland was set to perform in position 18, following the entry from Switzerland and before the entry from Cyprus.

In Ireland, the two semi-finals were broadcast on RTÉ2 and the final was broadcast on RTÉ One with all three shows featuring commentary by Marty Whelan. The second semi-final and the final were also broadcast via radio; the second semi-final was broadcast on RTÉ Radio 1 and the final was broadcast on RTÉ 2fm with both shows featuring commentary by Neil Doherty and Zbyszek Zalinski. The Irish spokesperson, who announced the top 12-point score awarded by the Irish jury during the final, was Nicky Byrne who represented Ireland in 2016.

=== Semi-final ===
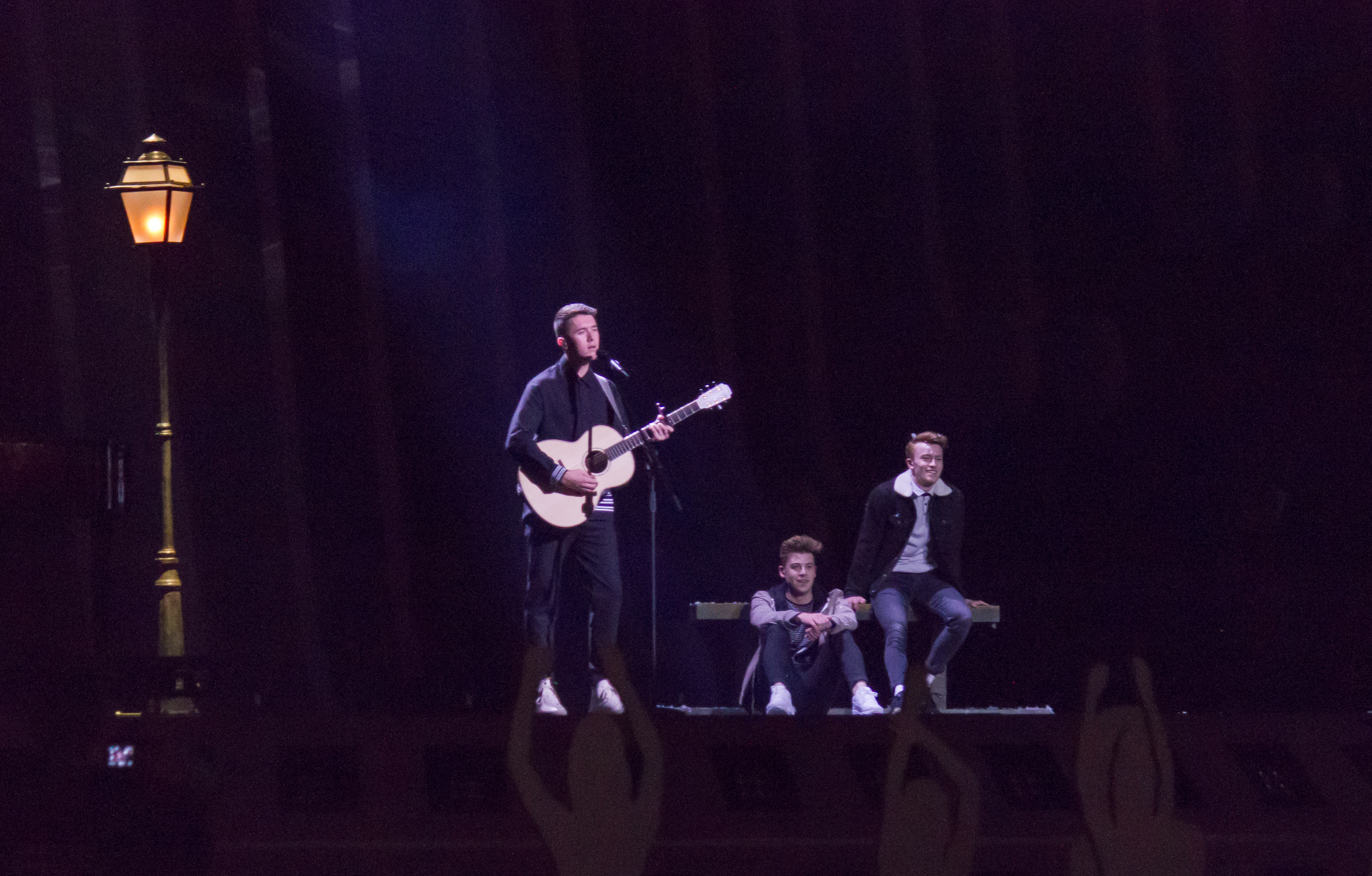
Ryan O'Shaughnessy during a rehearsal before the first semi-final

Ryan O'Shaughnessy took part in technical rehearsals on 30 April and 4 May, followed by dress rehearsals on 7 and 8 May. This included the jury show on 7 May where the professional juries of each country watched and voted on the competing entries.

The Irish performance featured Ryan O'Shaughnessy playing the guitar and performing together with two dancers, two off-stage backing vocalists and a pianist who also performed backing vocals. Throughout the song, the dancers performed a choreographed routine around a ramp and a park bench next to a street light with snow gently falling on them at the end of the performance. The dancers that joined Ryan O'Shaughnessy on stage were Alan McGrath and Kevin O'Dwyer, while the backing vocalists were Claire-Ann Varley, Janet Grogan and Remy Anna Naidoo.

At the end of the show, Ireland was announced as having finished in the top 10 and subsequently qualifying for the grand final. This was the first time in four years that Ireland had managed to qualify to the Eurovision final; their last appearance in a final was in 2013. It was later revealed that the Ireland placed sixth in the semi-final, receiving a total of 179 points: 108 points from the televoting and 71 points from the juries.

=== Final ===
Shortly after the first semi-final, a winners' press conference was held for the ten qualifying countries. As part of this press conference, the qualifying artists took part in a draw to determine which half of the grand final they would subsequently participate in. This draw was done in the order the countries were announced during the semi-final. Ireland was drawn to compete in the second half. Following this draw, the shows' producers decided upon the running order of the final, as they had done for the semi-finals. Ireland was subsequently placed to perform in position 24, following the entry from the Netherlands and before the entry from Cyprus.

Ryan O'Shaughnessy once again took part in dress rehearsals on 11 and 12 May before the final, including the jury final where the professional juries cast their final votes before the live show. Ryan O'Shaughnessy performed a repeat of his semi-final performance during the final on 12 May. Ireland placed sixteenth in the final, scoring 136 points: 74 points from the televoting and 62 points from the juries.

=== Voting ===
Voting during the three shows involved each country awarding two sets of points from 1-8, 10 and 12: one from their professional jury and the other from televoting. Each nation's jury consisted of five music industry professionals who are citizens of the country they represent, with their names published before the contest to ensure transparency. This jury judged each entry based on: vocal capacity; the stage performance; the song's composition and originality; and the overall impression by the act. In addition, no member of a national jury was permitted to be related in any way to any of the competing acts in such a way that they cannot vote impartially and independently. The individual rankings of each jury member as well as the nation's televoting results were released shortly after the grand final.

Below is a breakdown of points awarded to Ireland and awarded by Ireland in the first semi-final and grand final of the contest, and the breakdown of the jury voting and televoting conducted during the two shows:

==== Points awarded to Ireland ====
Points awarded to Ireland (Semi-final 1)
| Score | Televote | Jury |
|---|---|---|
| 12 points | Austria; Belgium; Spain | Lithuania |
| 10 points | United Kingdom | Switzerland |
| 8 points | Croatia; Portugal | Czech Republic; Iceland |
| 7 points | | Croatia |
| 6 points | Azerbaijan; Finland; Switzerland | Estonia |
| 5 points | Estonia | Austria; Belgium |
| 4 points | Czech Republic; Greece; Iceland; Israel; Lithuania | Finland |
| 3 points | | |
| 2 points | Cyprus | Belarus; Spain |
| 1 point | Belarus | Macedonia; United Kingdom |

Points awarded to Ireland (Final)
| Score | Televote | Jury |
|---|---|---|
| 12 points | | |
| 10 points | United Kingdom | Czech Republic |
| 8 points | Australia | Germany |
| 7 points | Albania; Germany | |
| 6 points | | Switzerland |
| 5 points | | Italy; Poland; Spain |
| 4 points | Austria; Belgium; Czech Republic; Denmark; Netherlands | Australia; Austria; Iceland; Lithuania; Sweden |
| 3 points | Portugal; San Marino | Croatia; Hungary; United Kingdom |
| 2 points | Poland | Finland |
| 1 point | Romania; Spain | Bulgaria; France; Norway; San Marino |

==== Points awarded by Ireland ====
Points awarded by Ireland (Semi-final 1)
| Score | Televote | Jury |
|---|---|---|
| 12 points | Lithuania | Cyprus |
| 10 points | Estonia | Israel |
| 8 points | Austria | Estonia |
| 7 points | Cyprus | Austria |
| 6 points | Finland | Bulgaria |
| 5 points | Israel | Finland |
| 4 points | Czech Republic | Czech Republic |
| 3 points | Bulgaria | Switzerland |
| 2 points | Switzerland | Belgium |
| 1 point | Albania | Greece |

Points awarded by Ireland (Final)
| Score | Televote | Jury |
|---|---|---|
| 12 points | Lithuania | Cyprus |
| 10 points | United Kingdom | Bulgaria |
| 8 points | Germany | Germany |
| 7 points | Czech Republic | Israel |
| 6 points | Israel | Portugal |
| 5 points | Cyprus | Austria |
| 4 points | Estonia | France |
| 3 points | Netherlands | Estonia |
| 2 points | Denmark | Albania |
| 1 point | Moldova | Spain |

==== Detailed voting results ====
The following five members formed the Irish jury:

- Tom Dunne (jury chairperson) – musician, singer, songwriter, radio presenter
- Niamh Kavanagh – singer, winner of the 1993 contest, represented Ireland in the 2010 contest
- Thomas Crosse (Crossy) – radio presenter, producer
- Aoife Barry – music and culture assistant editor at TheJournal.ie
- Kenneth Giles – creative director, choreographer, performer

Detailed voting results from Ireland (Semi-final 1)
| R/O | Country | Jury | | | | | | | Televote | |
| R/O | Country | T. Dunne | N. Kavanagh | Crossy | A. Barry | K. Giles | Rank | Points | Rank | Points |
|---|---|---|---|---|---|---|---|---|---|---|
| 01 | Azerbaijan | 12 | 12 | 12 | 14 | 8 | 14 | | 17 | |
| 02 | Iceland | 18 | 16 | 17 | 15 | 17 | 17 | | 16 | |
| 03 | Albania | 7 | 11 | 7 | 13 | 16 | 11 | | 10 | 1 |
| 04 | Belgium | 4 | 8 | 16 | 7 | 11 | 9 | 2 | 11 | |
| 05 | Czech Republic | 17 | 10 | 4 | 4 | 7 | 7 | 4 | 7 | 4 |
| 06 | Lithuania | 15 | 14 | 10 | 9 | 14 | 15 | | 1 | 12 |
| 07 | Israel | 2 | 4 | 2 | 5 | 3 | 2 | 10 | 6 | 5 |
| 08 | Belarus | 16 | 18 | 18 | 17 | 15 | 18 | | 15 | |
| 09 | Estonia | 1 | 1 | 14 | 6 | 2 | 3 | 8 | 2 | 10 |
| 10 | Bulgaria | 3 | 3 | 8 | 11 | 4 | 5 | 6 | 8 | 3 |
| 11 | Macedonia | 11 | 17 | 15 | 18 | 18 | 16 | | 18 | |
| 12 | Croatia | 13 | 13 | 6 | 10 | 13 | 12 | | 12 | |
| 13 | Austria | 9 | 2 | 5 | 2 | 5 | 4 | 7 | 3 | 8 |
| 14 | Greece | 5 | 7 | 13 | 16 | 10 | 10 | 1 | 13 | |
| 15 | Finland | 14 | 9 | 3 | 3 | 6 | 6 | 5 | 5 | 6 |
| 16 | Armenia | 8 | 15 | 11 | 12 | 12 | 13 | | 14 | |
| 17 | Switzerland | 6 | 6 | 9 | 8 | 9 | 8 | 3 | 9 | 2 |
| 18 | Ireland | | | | | | | | | |
| 19 | Cyprus | 10 | 5 | 1 | 1 | 1 | 1 | 12 | 4 | 7 |

Detailed voting results from Ireland (Final)
| R/O | Country | Jury | | | | | | | Televote | |
| R/O | Country | T. Dunne | N. Kavanagh | Crossy | A. Barry | K. Giles | Rank | Points | Rank | Points |
|---|---|---|---|---|---|---|---|---|---|---|
| 01 | Ukraine | 24 | 17 | 13 | 23 | 20 | 20 | | 21 | |
| 02 | Spain | 5 | 8 | 11 | 9 | 19 | 10 | 1 | 19 | |
| 03 | Slovenia | 23 | 21 | 18 | 22 | 24 | 24 | | 24 | |
| 04 | Lithuania | 16 | 23 | 14 | 14 | 8 | 15 | | 1 | 12 |
| 05 | Austria | 12 | 6 | 4 | 1 | 10 | 6 | 5 | 11 | |
| 06 | Estonia | 13 | 9 | 12 | 6 | 5 | 8 | 3 | 7 | 4 |
| 07 | Norway | 11 | 13 | 19 | 18 | 17 | 18 | | 17 | |
| 08 | Portugal | 1 | 4 | 20 | 3 | 21 | 5 | 6 | 22 | |
| 09 | United Kingdom | 8 | 11 | 7 | 12 | 22 | 13 | | 2 | 10 |
| 10 | Serbia | 22 | 20 | 22 | 24 | 23 | 25 | | 25 | |
| 11 | Germany | 2 | 1 | 6 | 5 | 6 | 3 | 8 | 3 | 8 |
| 12 | Albania | 7 | 12 | 5 | 7 | 18 | 9 | 2 | 23 | |
| 13 | France | 4 | 7 | 15 | 8 | 2 | 7 | 4 | 13 | |
| 14 | Czech Republic | 25 | 16 | 9 | 19 | 12 | 16 | | 4 | 7 |
| 15 | Denmark | 19 | 18 | 21 | 15 | 9 | 17 | | 9 | 2 |
| 16 | Australia | 18 | 10 | 8 | 11 | 7 | 12 | | 12 | |
| 17 | Finland | 17 | 14 | 3 | 13 | 11 | 11 | | 16 | |
| 18 | Bulgaria | 3 | 2 | 10 | 2 | 3 | 2 | 10 | 20 | |
| 19 | Moldova | 21 | 22 | 16 | 25 | 14 | 21 | | 10 | 1 |
| 20 | Sweden | 14 | 15 | 17 | 17 | 13 | 19 | | 18 | |
| 21 | Hungary | 6 | 25 | 24 | 16 | 15 | 14 | | 14 | |
| 22 | Israel | 9 | 5 | 1 | 10 | 4 | 4 | 7 | 5 | 6 |
| 23 | Netherlands | 20 | 24 | 23 | 21 | 16 | 23 | | 8 | 3 |
| 24 | Ireland | | | | | | | | | |
| 25 | Cyprus | 10 | 3 | 2 | 4 | 1 | 1 | 12 | 6 | 5 |
| 26 | Italy | 15 | 19 | 25 | 20 | 25 | 22 | | 15 | |

=== Chinese broadcaster censorship ===
During the Chinese broadcast of the first semi-final on Mango TV, both Albania and Ireland were edited out of the show, along with their snippets in the recap of all 19 entries. Ireland was censored due to its representation of a homosexual couple on-stage. In addition, the LGBT flag was also blurred out from the broadcast. As a result, the EBU terminated its partnership with the Chinese broadcaster, explaining that censorship "is not in line with the EBU's values of universality and inclusivity and its proud tradition of celebrating diversity through music." The termination led to a ban on televising the second semi-final and the grand final in the country. A spokesperson for the broadcaster's parent company Hunan TV said they "weren't aware" of the edits made to the programme. Ireland's representative O'Shaughnessy told the BBC in an interview, "they haven't taken this lightly and I think it's a move in the right direction, so I'm happy about it."
