= Czech Republic in the Eurovision Song Contest 2018 =

- Eurovision Song Contest 2018
- Participating broadcaster: Czech Television (ČT)
- Country: Czech Republic
- Selection process: Eurovision Song CZ
- Selection date: 29 January 2018

Competing entry
- Song: "Lie to Me"
- Artist: Mikolas Josef
- Songwriters: Mikolas Josef

Placement
- Semi-final result: Qualified (3rd, 232 points)
- Final result: 6th, 281 points

Participation chronology

The Czech Republic was represented at the Eurovision Song Contest 2018 with the song "Lie to Me" written and performed by Mikolas Josef. The Czech broadcaster Česká televize (ČT) organised the national final Eurovision Song CZ in order to select the Czech entry for the 2018 contest in Lisbon, Portugal. Six entries competed in the national final and "Lie to Me" performed by Mikolas Josef was announced as the winner on 29 January 2018 following the combination of votes from a ten-member international jury panel and a public vote.

Czech Republic was drawn to compete in the first semi-final of the Eurovision Song Contest which took place on 8 May 2018. Performing during the show in position 5, "Lie to Me" was announced among the top 10 entries of the first semi-final and therefore qualified to compete in the final on 12 May. It was later revealed that Czech Republic placed third out of the 19 participating countries in the semi-final with 232 points. In the final, Czech Republic performed in position 14 and placed sixth out of the 26 participating countries, scoring 281 points. This marked Czech Republic's best placing in the history of the contest.

== Background ==
Prior to the 2018 contest, the Czech Republic had participated in the Eurovision Song Contest six times since its first entry in 2007. The nation competed in the contest on three consecutive occasions between 2007 and 2009 without qualifying to the final: in 2007 Kabát performing "Malá dáma" placed 28th (last) in the semi-final achieving only one point, in 2008 Tereza Kerndlová performing "Have Some Fun" placed 18th (second to last) in her semi-final scoring nine points and in 2009 Gipsy.cz performing the song "Aven Romale" placed 18th (last) in their semi-final failing to score any points. The Czech broadcaster withdrew from the contest between 2010 and 2014 citing reasons such as low viewing figures and poor results for their absence, and returned to the contest in 2015, once again failing to qualify to the final with the song "Hope Never Dies" performed by Marta Jandová and Václav Noid Bárta. In 2016, Czech Republic managed to qualify for the final for the first time, placing twenty-fifth with Gabriela Gunčíková and the song "I Stand", however the country failed to qualify to the final in 2017 with the song "My Turn" performed by Martina Bárta.

The Czech national broadcaster, Česká televize (ČT), broadcasts the event within Czech Republic and organises the selection process for the nation's entry. The broadcaster has used both national finals and internal selections to select the Czech Eurovision entry in the past. ČT confirmed their intentions to participate at the 2018 Eurovision Song Contest in September 2017. The broadcaster later confirmed in December 2017 that the Czech entry for the 2018 contest would be selected through a national final for the first time since 2009.

== Before Eurovision ==
=== Eurovision Song CZ ===
Eurovision Song CZ was the national final organised by ČT in order to select the Czech entry for the Eurovision Song Contest 2018. Six entries participated in the competition which took place online between 8 and 22 January 2018, with the winner being selected via a jury and public vote and announced on 29 January 2018.

==== Competing entries ====
Artists and composers were able to submit their proposals to the broadcaster between 26 September 2017 and 17 November 2017. Artists were required to have Czech citizenship and for groups of a maximum of six members, at least one of the lead vocalists were required to have Czech citizenship. Songwriters of any nationality were able to submit songs. The broadcaster received over 400 submissions at the closing of the deadline, of which 36 were written by Czech songwriters. ČT selected six entries for the national final from the submissions received, which were presented to the public during a press conference on 8 January 2018.

==== Final ====
Six entries competed in the national final and the winner was determined by the combination of votes from a ten-member international jury panel and a public vote held via the official Eurovision Song Contest application between 8 and 22 January 2018. The international jury consisted of former Eurovision entrants, while both international and Czech users were able to vote via the app with only votes from users in the Czech Republic being counted. The winner, "Lie to Me" performed by Mikolas Josef, was announced on 29 January 2018.

The international jury panel consisted of:

- Dami Im – represented Australia in 2016
- Robin Bengtsson – represented Sweden in 2017
- Naviband – represented Belarus in 2017
- SunStroke Project – represented Moldova in 2010 and 2017
- Sanja Vučić – represented Serbia in 2016
- Jalisse – represented Italy in 1997
- Iveta Mukuchyan – represented Armenia in 2016
- Nathan Trent – represented Austria in 2017
- Norma John – represented Finland in 2017
- Liora Simon – represented Israel in 1995

Artist	Song	Songwriter(s)	Jury		Public	Total	Place
Artist	Song	Songwriter(s)	Votes	Points	Public	Total	Place
Debbi	"High on Love"	Ellie Wyatt, Jon Hällgren, Mahan Moin, DWB	54	6	3	9	2
Doctor Victor	"Stand Up"	Doctor Victor	30	3	1	4	6
Eddie Stoilow	"We Rule This World"	Jan Žampa, Jan Martínek	27	2	2	4	5
Eva Burešová	"Fly"	Václav Noid Bárta, David Vostrý	27	2	6	8	3
Mikolas Josef	"Lie to Me"	Mikolas Josef	68	8	8	16	1
Pavel Callta	"Never Forget"	Pavel Callta	34	4	4	8	4

=== Promotion ===
Mikolas Josef made several appearances across Europe to specifically promote "Lie to Me" as the Czech Eurovision entry. On 10 February, Josef performed "Lie to Me" during the first semi-final of the Ukrainian Eurovision national final. On 24 March, Josef performed during the Eurovision PreParty Riga, which was organised by OGAE Latvia and held at the Crystal Club Concert Hall in Riga, Latvia. On 5 April, Josef performed during the London Eurovision Party, which was held at the Café de Paris venue in London, United Kingdom and hosted by Nicki French and Paddy O'Connell. Between 8 and 11 April, Josef took part in promotional activities in Tel Aviv, Israel and performed during the Israel Calling event held at the Rabin Square. On 14 April, Josef performed during the Eurovision in Concert event which was held at the AFAS Live venue in Amsterdam, Netherlands and hosted by Edsilia Rombley and Cornald Maas. On 21 April, Mikolas Josef performed during the ESPreParty event which was held at the Sala La Riviera venue in Madrid, Spain and hosted by Soraya Arnelas.

== At Eurovision ==
According to Eurovision rules, all nations with the exceptions of the host country and the "Big Five" (France, Germany, Italy, Spain and the United Kingdom) are required to qualify from one of two semi-finals in order to compete for the final; the top ten countries from each semi-final progress to the final. The European Broadcasting Union (EBU) split up the competing countries into six different pots based on voting patterns from previous contests, with countries with favourable voting histories put into the same pot. On 29 January 2018, a special allocation draw was held which placed each country into one of the two semi-finals, as well as which half of the show they would perform in. The Czech Republic was placed into the first semi-final, to be held on 8 May 2018, and was scheduled to perform in the first half of the show.

Once all the competing songs for the 2018 contest had been released, the running order for the semi-finals was decided by the shows' producers rather than through another draw, so that similar songs were not placed next to each other. The Czech Republic was set to perform in position 5, following the entry from Belgium and before the entry from Lithuania.

In the Czech Republic, the semi-finals were broadcast on ČT2 and the final was broadcast on ČT1. All three shows featured commentary by Libor Bouček. The Czech spokesperson, who will announce the top 12-point score awarded by the Czech jury during the final, was Radka Rosická.

=== Semi-final ===
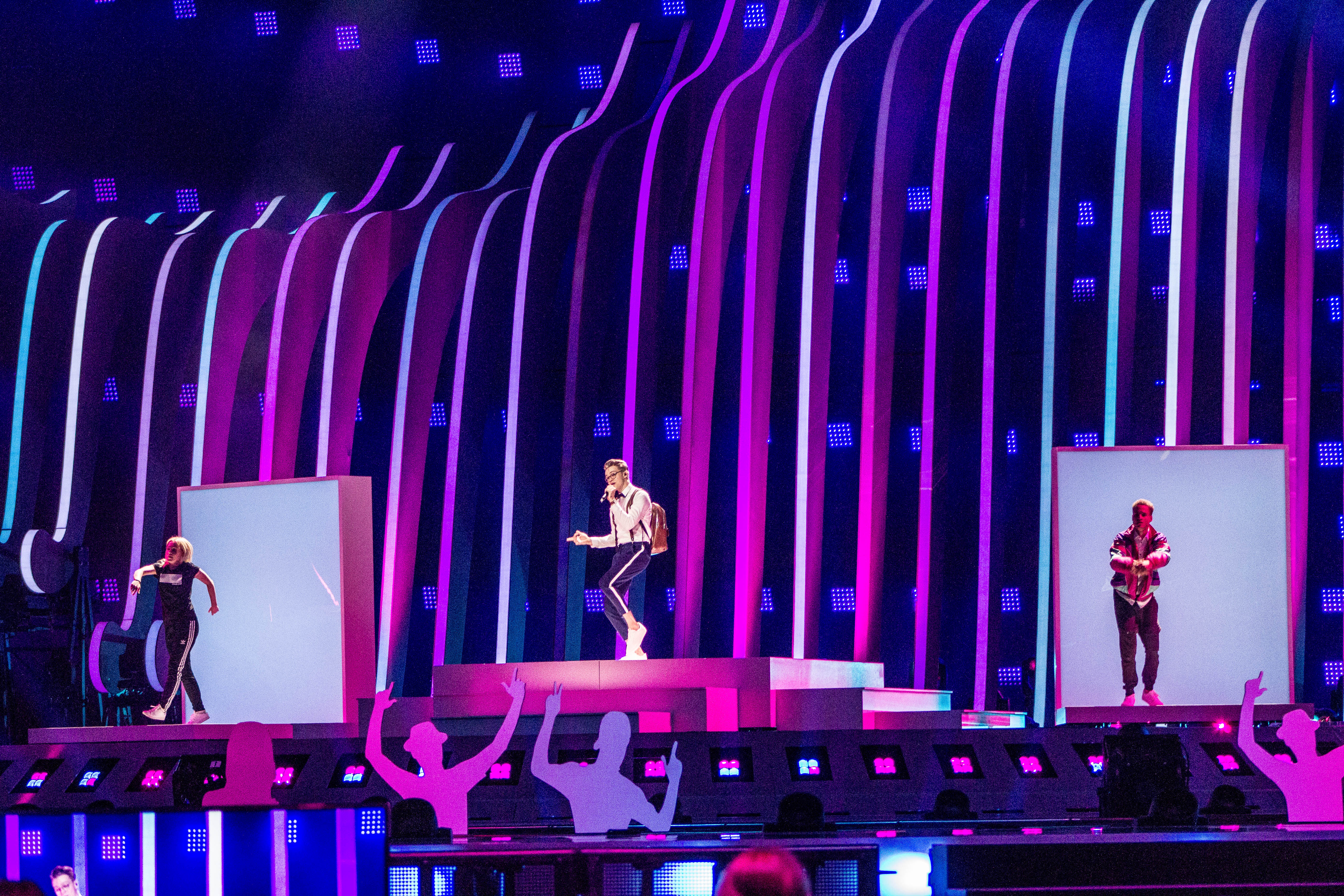
Mikolas Josef during a rehearsal before the first semi-final

Mikolas Josef took part in technical rehearsals on 29 April and 3 May, followed by dress rehearsals on 7 and 8 May. This included the jury show on 7 May where the professional juries of each country watched and voted on the competing entries.

The Czech performance featured Josef wearing a white shirt, black pants with white stripes, a bowtie and brown backpack, and appearing on stage with two dancers, one wearing an oversized blue sweater and the other wearing a pink bomber jacket. The performance began with the dancers against light-up screens with pig on a small staircase against a predominantly blue and pink stage. The dancers later joined Josef on the staircase and did a dance routine together. Despite having intended to doing a front flip off the staircase at the end of the song, Josef decided against the action due to a back injury that he suffered prior to the semi-final. The two dancers that performed with Josef were Kristián Mensa and Marek Mensa, while three off-stage backing vocalists were also featured: Alzbeta Bartosová, Juraj Bernáth and Pamela Koky.

At the end of the show, Czech Republic was announced as having finished in the top 10 and subsequently qualifying for the grand final. It was later revealed that the Czech Republic placed third in the semi-final, receiving a total of 232 points: 134 points from the televoting and 98 points from the juries.

=== Final ===
Shortly after the first semi-final, a winners' press conference was held for the ten qualifying countries. As part of this press conference, the qualifying artists took part in a draw to determine which half of the grand final they would subsequently participate in. This draw was done in the order the countries were announced during the semi-final. The Czech Republic was drawn to compete in the second half. Following this draw, the shows' producers decided upon the running order of the final, as they had done for the semi-finals. The Czech Republic was subsequently placed to perform in position 14, following the entry from France and before the entry from Denmark.

Mikolas Josef once again took part in dress rehearsals on 11 and 12 May before the final, including the jury final where the professional juries cast their final votes before the live show. Mikolas Josef performed a repeat of his semi-final performance during the final on 12 May, which included a successful front flip attempt in spite of his back injury. Czech Republic placed sixth in the final, scoring 281 points: 215 points from the televoting and 66 points from the juries. This marked Czech Republic's best result in the contest to date.

=== Voting ===
Voting during the three shows involved each country awarding two sets of points from 1-8, 10 and 12: one from their professional jury and the other from televoting. Each nation's jury consisted of five music industry professionals who are citizens of the country they represent, with their names published before the contest to ensure transparency. This jury judged each entry based on: vocal capacity; the stage performance; the song's composition and originality; and the overall impression by the act. In addition, no member of a national jury was permitted to be related in any way to any of the competing acts in such a way that they cannot vote impartially and independently. The individual rankings of each jury member as well as the nation's televoting results were released shortly after the grand final.

Below is a breakdown of points awarded to the Czech Republic and awarded by the Czech Republic in the first semi-final and grand final of the contest, and the breakdown of the jury voting and televoting conducted during the two shows:

==== Points awarded to the Czech Republic ====
Points awarded to the Czech Republic (Semi-final 1)
Score	Televote	Jury
12 points	Iceland; Israel	
10 points	Austria; Croatia	Belarus; Belgium; Croatia
8 points	Azerbaijan; Belarus; Belgium	Austria; Macedonia; Switzerland
7 points	Armenia; Cyprus; Estonia; Finland; Lithuania	Armenia; Bulgaria; Spain
6 points	Greece; Macedonia	
5 points		Iceland; Lithuania
4 points	Ireland; Spain	Ireland
3 points	Bulgaria; Switzerland	Israel; Portugal
2 points	Albania; United Kingdom	Greece
1 point	Portugal	Cyprus

Points awarded to the Czech Republic (Final)
Score	Televote	Jury
12 points	Austria; Israel	
10 points	Iceland; San Marino; Spain; Ukraine	
8 points	Armenia; Cyprus; Germany; Hungary; Lithuania; Slovenia	Bulgaria
7 points	Greece; Ireland	Belgium
6 points	Azerbaijan; Denmark; Moldova; Netherlands	Armenia; Belarus
5 points	Belarus; Croatia; Estonia; Finland; Macedonia; Serbia; United Kingdom	Cyprus; Malta
4 points	Latvia; Norway; Poland	Croatia; France; Macedonia; Spain; Ukraine
3 points	Australia; Bulgaria; Malta; Romania; Sweden	Austria; Slovenia
2 points	Russia	
1 point	Belgium	Albania; Australia; Iceland

==== Points awarded by the Czech Republic ====
Points awarded by the Czech Republic (Semi-final 1)
Score	Televote	Jury
12 points	Israel	Israel
10 points	Azerbaijan	Belgium
8 points	Armenia	Ireland
7 points	Cyprus	Bulgaria
6 points	Austria	Switzerland
5 points	Estonia	Albania
4 points	Ireland	Iceland
3 points	Albania	Lithuania
2 points	Bulgaria	Armenia
1 point	Finland	Austria

Points awarded by the Czech Republic (Final)
Score	Televote	Jury
12 points	Ukraine	Israel
10 points	Israel	Ireland
8 points	Cyprus	Sweden
7 points	Denmark	Slovenia
6 points	Moldova	Albania
5 points	Estonia	Austria
4 points	Ireland	Bulgaria
3 points	Germany	Finland
2 points	Italy	Hungary
1 point	Bulgaria	Lithuania

==== Detailed voting results ====
The following members comprised the Czech jury:

- Ota Balage (jury chairperson) – musician, composer, conductor
- Jan P. Muchow – producer, composer
- Hana Biriczová – radio host
- Berenika Kohoutová – singer, actress, blogger
- Jiří Vidasov – musician, composer, producer, pianist, teacher

Detailed voting results from the Czech Republic (Semi-final 1)
R/O	Country	Jury							Televote	
R/O	Country	O. Balage	J.P. Muchow	H. Biriczová	B. Kohoutová	J. Vidasov	Rank	Points	Rank	Points
01	Azerbaijan	18	14	13	15	18	15		2	10
02	Iceland	3	10	8	9	11	7	4	18	
03	Albania	5	7	5	5	5	6	5	8	3
04	Belgium	2	1	4	4	4	2	10	15	
05	Czech Republic									
06	Lithuania	12	4	12	8	6	8	3	14	
07	Israel	4	2	1	2	3	1	12	1	12
08	Belarus	13	15	16	14	13	14		13	
09	Estonia	14	9	15	10	10	12		6	5
10	Bulgaria	1	3	3	6	7	4	7	9	2
11	Macedonia	16	18	17	18	14	17		17	
12	Croatia	11	11	11	12	15	13		16	
13	Austria	8	12	7	11	8	10	1	5	6
14	Greece	15	16	14	17	16	16		12	
15	Finland	10	13	6	13	12	11		10	1
16	Armenia	7	8	10	7	9	9	2	3	8
17	Switzerland	6	5	9	3	1	5	6	11	
18	Ireland	9	6	2	1	2	3	8	7	4
19	Cyprus	17	17	18	16	17	18		4	7

Detailed voting results from the Czech Republic (Final)
R/O	Country	Jury							Televote	
R/O	Country	O. Balage	J.P. Muchow	H. Biriczová	B. Kohoutová	J. Vidasov	Rank	Points	Rank	Points
01	Ukraine	14	22	22	21	23	22		1	12
02	Spain	18	13	23	16	12	16		24	
03	Slovenia	3	3	4	4	5	4	7	23	
04	Lithuania	11	8	12	9	8	10	1	16	
05	Austria	4	9	9	6	4	6	5	12	
06	Estonia	15	12	11	14	11	13		6	5
07	Norway	17	18	21	20	21	23		11	
08	Portugal	16	7	13	17	18	14		25	
09	United Kingdom	12	14	8	10	15	11		17	
10	Serbia	19	24	20	19	14	20		15	
11	Germany	13	15	15	7	13	12		8	3
12	Albania	1	10	7	5	3	5	6	14	
13	France	22	16	16	18	16	18		19	
14	Czech Republic									
15	Denmark	21	23	17	23	19	24		4	7
16	Australia	20	17	18	22	20	21		22	
17	Finland	8	5	3	15	10	8	3	21	
18	Bulgaria	5	4	6	11	9	7	4	10	1
19	Moldova	25	25	25	24	25	25		5	6
20	Sweden	6	2	5	1	7	3	8	18	
21	Hungary	10	11	14	8	6	9	2	13	
22	Israel	2	1	1	3	1	1	12	2	10
23	Netherlands	9	21	24	12	22	15		20	
24	Ireland	7	6	2	2	2	2	10	7	4
25	Cyprus	23	19	10	25	24	17		3	8
26	Italy	24	20	19	13	17	19		9	2
