= Austria in the Eurovision Song Contest 2018 =

- Eurovision Song Contest 2018
- Participating broadcaster: Österreichischer Rundfunk (ORF)
- Country: Austria
- Selection process: Internal selection
- Announcement date: Artist: 5 December 2017; Song: 9 March 2018

Competing entry
- Song: "Nobody but You"
- Artist: Cesár Sampson
- Songwriters: Cesár Sampson; Borislav Milanov; Sebastian Arman; Joacim Persson; Johan Alkenäs

Placement
- Semi-final result: Qualified (4th, 231 points)
- Final result: 3rd, 342 points

Participation chronology

Austria was represented at the Eurovision Song Contest 2018 with the song "Nobody but You", written by Cesár Sampson, Borislav Milanov, Sebastian Arman, Joacim Persson, and Johan Alkenäs, and performed by Sampson himself. On 5 December 2017, the Austrian broadcaster Österreichischer Rundfunk (ORF) announced it had internally selected Sampson to compete in the contest, while "Nobody but You" was presented to the public on 9 March 2018.

Austria was drawn to compete in the first semi-final of the Eurovision Song Contest which took place on 8 May 2018. Performing during the show in position 13, "Nobody but You" was announced among the top 10 entries of the first semi-final and therefore qualified to compete in the final on 12 May. It was later revealed that Austria placed fourth out of the 19 participating countries in the semi-final with 231 points. In the final, Austria performed in position 5 and placed third out of the 26 participating countries, scoring 342 points.

== Background ==
Austria has participated in the Eurovision Song Contest fifty times since its first entry in 1957. It won the contest twice: in 1966 with the song "Merci, Chérie" performed by Udo Jürgens and in 2014 with the song "Rise Like a Phoenix" performed by Conchita Wurst. Following the introduction of semi-finals for the 2004 contest, Austria participated in six finals. Austria's came in last place on eight occasions, most recently in 2012. Austria also received nul points on four occasions; in 1962, 1988, 1991 and 2015.

The Austrian national broadcaster, Österreichischer Rundfunk (ORF), broadcasts the event in Austria and holds a selection process for the nation's entry. From 2011 to 2013 as well as in 2015 and 2016, ORF set up national finals with several artists to choose both the song and performer to compete at Eurovision for Austria, with both the public and a panel of jury members involved in the selection. In 2014 and 2017, ORF has held an internal selection to choose the artist and song to represent Austria at the contest, a method which was continued to select the Austrian entry for the 2018 contest.

== Before Eurovision ==
=== Internal selection ===
Artists were nominated by the ORF Eurovision Song Contest Team led by ORF chief editor Stefan Zechner, which collaborated with music expert Eberhard Forcher who worked on the selection of the Austrian entries since 2016, to submit songs to the broadcaster. ORF also invited all interested artists to submit their songs to the broadcaster between 10 August 2017 and 31 August 2017. On 5 December 2017, ORF announced during the radio show Ö3-Wecker, aired on Ö3, that they had internally selected Cesár Sampson to represent Austria in Lisbon. On 27 February 2018, the song "Nobody but You", written by Cesár Sampson himself together with members of the songwriting team Symphonix International, Borislav Milanov, Sebastian Arman, Joacim Persson and Johan Alkenäs was announced as the Austrian entry for the contest. Milanov, Arman and Persson had previously been involved in the composition of a number of songs for Bulgaria at Eurovision, notably Poli Genova's Eurovision 2016 entry "If Love Was a Crime" and Kristian Kostov's Eurovision 2017 entry "Beautiful Mess". The presentation of the song took place on 9 March 2018 during Ö3-Wecker.

=== Promotion ===
Cesár Sampson made several appearances across Europe to specifically promote "Nobody but You" as the Austrian Eurovision entry. On 6 April, Sampson performed during the London Eurovision Party, which was held at the Café de Paris venue in London, United Kingdom and hosted by Nicki French and Paddy O’Connell. Between 8 and 11 April, Sampson took part in promotional activities in Tel Aviv, Israel and performed during the Israel Calling event held at the Rabin Square. On 14 April, Sampson performed during the Eurovision in Concert event which was held at the AFAS Live venue in Amsterdam, Netherlands and hosted by Cornald Maas and Edsilia Rombley.

== At Eurovision ==
According to Eurovision rules, all nations with the exceptions of the host country and the "Big Five" (France, Germany, Italy, Spain and the United Kingdom) are required to qualify from one of two semi-finals in order to compete for the final; the top ten countries from each semi-final progress to the final. The European Broadcasting Union (EBU) split up the competing countries into six different pots based on voting patterns from previous contests, with countries with favourable voting histories put into the same pot. On 29 January 2018, a special allocation draw was held which placed each country into one of the two semi-finals, as well as which half of the show they would perform in. Austria was placed into the first semi-final, to be held on 8 May 2018, and was scheduled to perform in the second half of the show.

Once all the competing songs for the 2018 contest had been released, the running order for the semi-finals was decided by the shows' producers rather than through another draw, so that similar songs were not placed next to each other. Austria was set to perform in position 13, following the entry from Croatia and before the entry from Greece.

The two semi-finals and the final were broadcast in Austria on ORF eins with commentary by Andi Knoll. The Austrian spokesperson, who announced the top 12-point score awarded by the Austrian jury during the final, was Kati Bellowitsch.

=== Semi-final ===
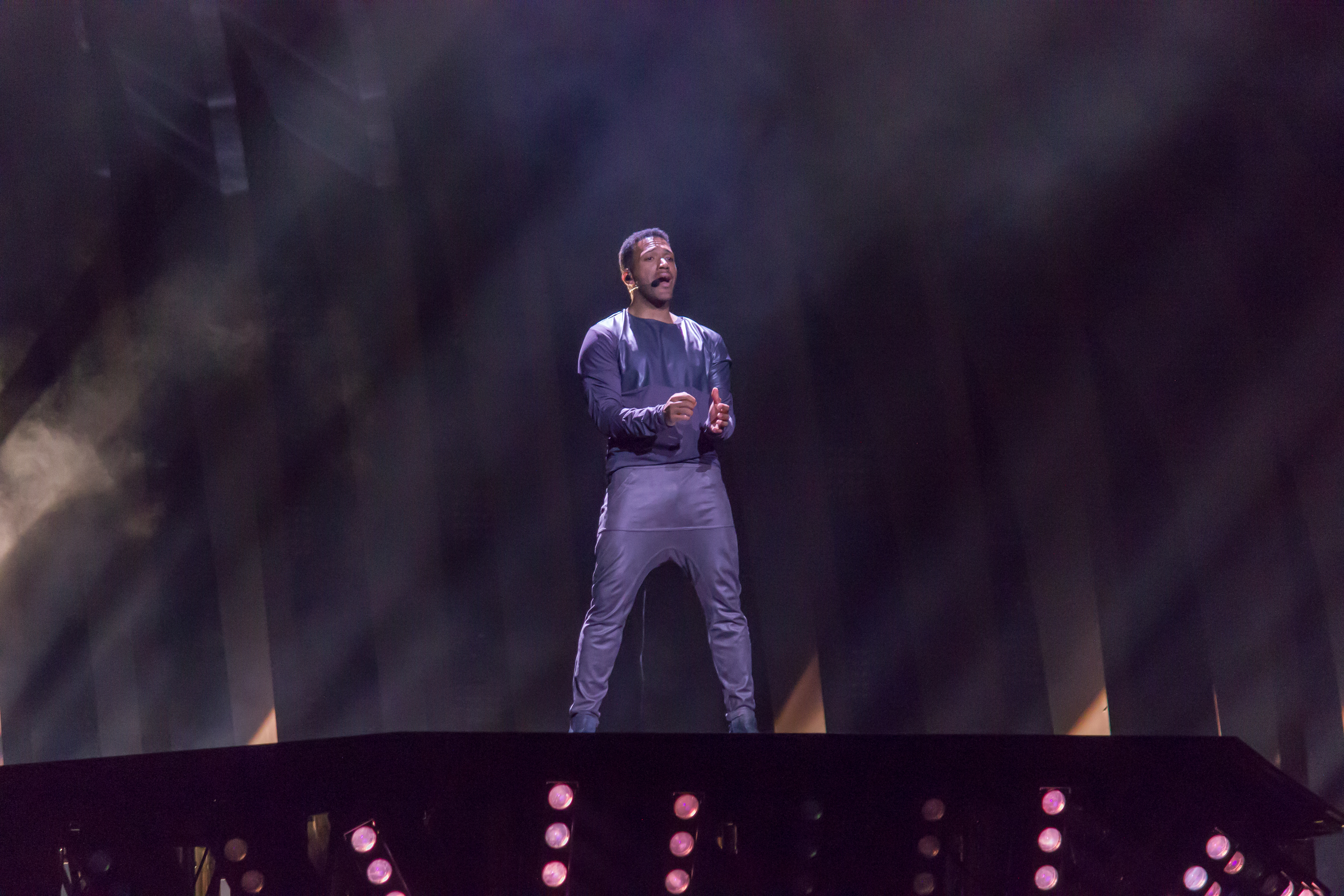
Cesár Sampson during a rehearsal before the first semi-final

Cesár Sampson took part in technical rehearsals on 30 April and 3 May, followed by dress rehearsals on 7 and 8 May. This included the jury show on 7 May where the professional juries of each country watched and voted on the competing entries.

The Austrian performance featured Cesár Sampson performing on stage in a grey outfit with white spotlights from above. The performance began with Sampson on a raised platform with gold lights from underneath, of which he later landed further down onto the centre stage accompanied by a hologram of the singer. Cesár Sampson was joined by five off-stage backing vocalists: Kiko Pereira, Rachelle Jeanty, Ricardo Soler, Sandra Kurzweil and Sunay Balkan.

At the end of the show, Austria was announced as having finished in the top 10 and subsequently qualifying for the grand final. It was later revealed that Austria placed fourth in the semi-final, receiving a total of 231 points: 115 points from the televoting and 116 points from the juries.

=== Final ===
Shortly after the first semi-final, a winners' press conference was held for the ten qualifying countries. As part of this press conference, the qualifying artists took part in a draw to determine which half of the grand final they would subsequently participate in. This draw was done in the order the countries were announced during the semi-final. Austria was drawn to compete in the first half. Following this draw, the shows' producers decided upon the running order of the final, as they had done for the semi-finals. Austria was subsequently placed to perform in position 5, following the entry from Lithuania and before the entry from Estonia.

Cesár Sampson once again took part in dress rehearsals on 11 and 12 May before the final, including the jury final where the professional juries cast their final votes before the live show. Cesár Sampson performed a repeat of his semi-final performance during the final on 12 May. Austria placed third in the final, scoring 342 points: 71 points from the televoting and 271 points from the juries.

=== Voting ===
Voting during the three shows involved each country awarding two sets of points from 1-8, 10 and 12: one from their professional jury and the other from televoting. Each nation's jury consisted of five music industry professionals who are citizens of the country they represent, with their names published before the contest to ensure transparency. This jury judged each entry based on: vocal capacity; the stage performance; the song's composition and originality; and the overall impression by the act. In addition, no member of a national jury was permitted to be related in any way to any of the competing acts in such a way that they cannot vote impartially and independently. The individual rankings of each jury member as well as the nation's televoting results were released shortly after the grand final.

Below is a breakdown of points awarded to Austria and awarded by Austria in the first semi-final and grand final of the contest, and the breakdown of the jury voting and televoting conducted during the two shows:

==== Points awarded to Austria ====
Points awarded to Austria (Semi-final 1)
| Score | Televote | Jury |
|---|---|---|
| 12 points | Switzerland | Belgium; Estonia; Israel |
| 10 points | Belgium; Lithuania | Lithuania; United Kingdom |
| 8 points | Bulgaria; Estonia; Finland; Ireland; Israel | Bulgaria; Finland; Spain |
| 7 points | Croatia; Iceland | Iceland; Ireland |
| 6 points | Armenia; Czech Republic | Portugal; Switzerland |
| 5 points | Azerbaijan; Portugal | |
| 4 points | Belarus | Armenia |
| 3 points | Albania | Cyprus |
| 2 points | | |
| 1 point | Cyprus | Belarus; Czech Republic |

Points awarded to Austria (Final)
| Score | Televote | Jury |
|---|---|---|
| 12 points | | Belgium; Bulgaria; Estonia; Iceland; Israel; Lithuania; Poland; Romania; United Kingdom |
| 10 points | Denmark | Belarus; Germany; Netherlands; Slovenia; Sweden |
| 8 points | Norway | Denmark; Georgia; Hungary; Norway; Portugal; Spain |
| 7 points | | Finland; France; Italy; Latvia; Ukraine |
| 6 points | Armenia; Estonia | |
| 5 points | Germany; Iceland | Australia; Czech Republic; Ireland |
| 4 points | Bulgaria; Switzerland | Serbia; Switzerland |
| 3 points | Belgium; Finland; Hungary; Lithuania; Netherlands | Moldova |
| 2 points | Albania; Slovenia; Sweden | Cyprus |
| 1 point | Georgia; Israel | Armenia; Malta |

==== Points awarded by Austria ====
Points awarded by Austria (Semi-final 1)
| Score | Televote | Jury |
|---|---|---|
| 12 points | Ireland | Israel |
| 10 points | Czech Republic | Armenia |
| 8 points | Switzerland | Czech Republic |
| 7 points | Cyprus | Belgium |
| 6 points | Israel | Albania |
| 5 points | Bulgaria | Ireland |
| 4 points | Azerbaijan | Bulgaria |
| 3 points | Estonia | Estonia |
| 2 points | Croatia | Lithuania |
| 1 point | Albania | Switzerland |

Points awarded by Austria (Final)
| Score | Televote | Jury |
|---|---|---|
| 12 points | Czech Republic | Israel |
| 10 points | Italy | Germany |
| 8 points | Serbia | Sweden |
| 7 points | Israel | Albania |
| 6 points | Germany | Bulgaria |
| 5 points | Denmark | Slovenia |
| 4 points | Ireland | Ireland |
| 3 points | Hungary | Czech Republic |
| 2 points | Albania | Estonia |
| 1 point | Cyprus | Netherlands |

==== Detailed voting results ====
The following members comprised the Austrian jury:

- Nathanaele Koll (jury chairperson) – singer-songwriter, represented Austria in the 2017 contest
- Monika Ballwein – singer, producer, vocal coach, composer
- Hannes Tschürtz – founder and general manager of Ink Music
- Regina Mallinger (Ina Regen) – singer-songwriter
- Florian Cojocaru – songwriter, producer, label-owner

Detailed voting results from Austria (Semi-final 1)
| R/O | Country | Jury | | | | | | | Televote | |
| R/O | Country | M. Ballwein | H. Tschürtz | I. Regen | N. Trent | F. Cojocaru | Rank | Points | Rank | Points |
|---|---|---|---|---|---|---|---|---|---|---|
| 01 | Azerbaijan | 14 | 16 | 16 | 17 | 14 | 16 | | 7 | 4 |
| 02 | Iceland | 17 | 8 | 12 | 14 | 13 | 15 | | 17 | |
| 03 | Albania | 4 | 4 | 3 | 8 | 6 | 5 | 6 | 10 | 1 |
| 04 | Belgium | 1 | 6 | 1 | 13 | 11 | 4 | 7 | 14 | |
| 05 | Czech Republic | 5 | 10 | 2 | 2 | 4 | 3 | 8 | 2 | 10 |
| 06 | Lithuania | 15 | 7 | 5 | 15 | 7 | 9 | 2 | 12 | |
| 07 | Israel | 2 | 1 | 4 | 1 | 2 | 1 | 12 | 5 | 6 |
| 08 | Belarus | 16 | 18 | 17 | 18 | 17 | 18 | | 16 | |
| 09 | Estonia | 8 | 2 | 7 | 12 | 9 | 8 | 3 | 8 | 3 |
| 10 | Bulgaria | 6 | 9 | 8 | 9 | 3 | 7 | 4 | 6 | 5 |
| 11 | Macedonia | 18 | 17 | 18 | 16 | 16 | 17 | | 18 | |
| 12 | Croatia | 12 | 13 | 13 | 7 | 18 | 13 | | 9 | 2 |
| 13 | Austria | | | | | | | | | |
| 14 | Greece | 10 | 15 | 14 | 10 | 12 | 14 | | 13 | |
| 15 | Finland | 13 | 14 | 9 | 11 | 10 | 12 | | 11 | |
| 16 | Armenia | 3 | 5 | 6 | 3 | 1 | 2 | 10 | 15 | |
| 17 | Switzerland | 11 | 11 | 11 | 6 | 8 | 10 | 1 | 3 | 8 |
| 18 | Ireland | 7 | 3 | 10 | 5 | 5 | 6 | 5 | 1 | 12 |
| 19 | Cyprus | 9 | 12 | 15 | 4 | 15 | 11 | | 4 | 7 |

Detailed voting results from Austria (Final)
| R/O | Country | Jury | | | | | | | Televote | |
| R/O | Country | M. Ballwein | H. Tschürtz | I. Regen | N. Trent | F. Cojocaru | Rank | Points | Rank | Points |
|---|---|---|---|---|---|---|---|---|---|---|
| 01 | Ukraine | 22 | 22 | 22 | 13 | 22 | 22 | | 22 | |
| 02 | Spain | 12 | 16 | 20 | 7 | 17 | 15 | | 23 | |
| 03 | Slovenia | 14 | 3 | 3 | 12 | 9 | 6 | 5 | 20 | |
| 04 | Lithuania | 23 | 11 | 14 | 21 | 13 | 16 | | 15 | |
| 05 | Austria | | | | | | | | | |
| 06 | Estonia | 5 | 9 | 7 | 9 | 10 | 9 | 2 | 16 | |
| 07 | Norway | 15 | 12 | 15 | 17 | 16 | 17 | | 17 | |
| 08 | Portugal | 16 | 4 | 6 | 14 | 11 | 11 | | 25 | |
| 09 | United Kingdom | 18 | 15 | 19 | 18 | 19 | 20 | | 19 | |
| 10 | Serbia | 17 | 25 | 25 | 25 | 25 | 24 | | 3 | 8 |
| 11 | Germany | 6 | 7 | 4 | 1 | 1 | 2 | 10 | 5 | 6 |
| 12 | Albania | 3 | 6 | 5 | 8 | 4 | 4 | 7 | 9 | 2 |
| 13 | France | 11 | 18 | 21 | 15 | 18 | 18 | | 21 | |
| 14 | Czech Republic | 7 | 13 | 9 | 4 | 8 | 8 | 3 | 1 | 12 |
| 15 | Denmark | 21 | 24 | 24 | 20 | 24 | 25 | | 6 | 5 |
| 16 | Australia | 9 | 14 | 16 | 19 | 6 | 14 | | 14 | |
| 17 | Finland | 24 | 19 | 13 | 22 | 20 | 21 | | 24 | |
| 18 | Bulgaria | 13 | 10 | 2 | 10 | 3 | 5 | 6 | 13 | |
| 19 | Moldova | 25 | 20 | 23 | 24 | 15 | 23 | | 12 | |
| 20 | Sweden | 2 | 2 | 8 | 5 | 12 | 3 | 8 | 18 | |
| 21 | Hungary | 20 | 21 | 12 | 23 | 14 | 19 | | 8 | 3 |
| 22 | Israel | 4 | 1 | 1 | 3 | 2 | 1 | 12 | 4 | 7 |
| 23 | Netherlands | 1 | 23 | 11 | 16 | 21 | 10 | 1 | 11 | |
| 24 | Ireland | 10 | 5 | 10 | 6 | 5 | 7 | 4 | 7 | 4 |
| 25 | Cyprus | 19 | 8 | 18 | 2 | 23 | 12 | | 10 | 1 |
| 26 | Italy | 8 | 17 | 17 | 11 | 7 | 13 | | 2 | 10 |
