= Alejandro Reyes (singer) =

Swiss singer and songwriter (born 1992)

- Born: Alejandro Ignacio Reyes Meza; February 27, 1992 (age 34); Quilpué, Chile
- Genres: Pop, Latin Pop
- Occupations: Singer, songwriter
- Instruments: Vocals, guitar, keyboards
- Years active: 2013–present
- Labels: HitMill Records, The Hana Road Music Group
- Website: alejandro-reyes.com

Alejandro Reyes (born February 27, 1992) is a Swiss-Chilean singer and songwriter. He released his debut studio album Alejandro Reyes in September 2015. In January 2018, he was confirmed as one of the artists for ESC 2018 – Die Entscheidungsshow.

== Early life ==
Reyes was born in Chile, but due to a medical issue during his birth he was left with a disability in his left hand, but that did not stop him from playing the guitar and creating music. He moved to Switzerland at the age of ten and began his musical career when a friend gave him a guitar. He gets inspiration for his songs from real life situations.

== Career ==
=== 2013–16: Early beginnings and Alejandro Reyes ===
He released his debut single, "Lovely Season" on 11 February 2013. In 2014, he took part in season 3 of the French television series The Voice: la plus belle voix. In the blind auditions, he sang "Wake Me Up!" by Avicii, he was eliminated with no coach pressing their button. He released "The Only One" as the lead single from his debut album on 27 April 2015. His self-titled debut studio album was released on 25 September 2015 by HitMill Records. The album peaked at number 36 on the Swiss Albums Chart. On 21 October 2015, he released the single "Momento" with Snook, Make Plain and Anna. The song peaked at number 13 on the Swiss Singles Chart. The same year Alejandro was an opening act for Johny Halliday at Arena de Geneve.

On 8 January 2016, he released the single "Malaika".

=== 2017–present: Eurovision Song Contest ===
In 2017 Alejandro Reyes signs with a Swiss independent record label The Hana Road Music Group.

On 9 January 2018, he was confirmed as one of six acts taking part in ESC 2018 – Die Entscheidungsshow, the Swiss national final that will select Switzerland's entry for the Eurovision Song Contest 2018, he will sing "Compass", he co-wrote the song with Laurell Barker and Lars Christen. He also features as one of the songwriters of Naeman's song "Kiss Me". The show took place on 4 February 2018 at SRF's Studio 1 in Zürich, hosted by Sven Epiney. The winning entry was determined by a 50% public televote and 50% international jury vote. Alejandro finished in second place behind eventual winners Zibbz. In October Alejandro releases single "Solamente" that becomes the "Song of the Day" on one of the biggest Swiss radio stations SRF3.

In 2019 Alejandro becomes a part of the Coca-Cola Music Squad together with Bastian Baker, Loco Escrito and other Swiss singers for Coca-Cola's campaign in Switzerland. The same year he collaborates with AXA Insurance and Iceberg clothing brand.

Up until 2021 Alejandro releases a few singles in a row in collaboration with other Swiss singers. November 2019, he collaborates with a Dutch platinum-awarded DJ Justin Prime. His following collaborations include an Israeli star DJ Malka, Swiss singers LEROCQUE and El Tiger. In 2020 Alejandro releases a single in collaboration with his Eurovision colleagues, Swiss band Timebelle.

== Discography ==
=== Albums ===
Title	Details	Peak chart positions
Title	Details	SWI
Alejandro Reyes	Released: 25 September 2015; Label: HitMill Records; Format: Digital download, CD	36
El Inicio	Released: 14 June 2019; Label: The Hana Road Music Group; Format: Digital download	

=== Singles ===
Title	Year	Peak chart positions	Album
Title	Year	SWI	Album
"Lovely Season"	2013	—	Non-album single
"The Only One"	2015	—	Alejandro Reyes
"Momento" (with Snook, Make Plain and Anna)	2015	13	Non-album single
"Malaika"	2016	—	Non-album single
"Compass"	2018	—	Non-album single
"I Already Know"	2018	—	Non-album single
"Solamente"	2018	—	Non-album single
"Loco Enamorado"	2019	—	Non-album single
"Señorita"	2019	—	Non-album single
"Por Favor"	2019	—	Non-album single
"Ladrón" (with Justin Prime)	2019	—	Non-album single
"Mi Nena" (with Gal Malka)	2020	—	Non-album single
"Subete" (with El Tiger)	2020	—	Non-album single
"Asesina" (with Lerocque)	2020	—	Non-album single
"Rapido" (with Timebelle)	2020	—	Non-album single
"Boum Boum"	2020	—	Non-album single
"Quiero Darte"	2020	—	Non-album single
"Vuelves"	2021	—	Non-album single
"Ti Ti Ti"	2021		
"—" denotes a single that did not chart or was not released.
