= Finland in the Eurovision Song Contest 2018 =

- Eurovision Song Contest 2018
- Participating broadcaster: Yleisradio (Yle)
- Country: Finland
- Selection process: Artist: Internal selection Song: Uuden Musiikin Kilpailu 2018
- Selection date: Artist: 7 November 2017; Song: 3 March 2018

Competing entry
- Song: "Monsters"
- Artist: Saara Aalto
- Songwriters: Saara Aalto; Joy Deb; Linnea Deb; Ki Fitzgerald

Placement
- Semi-final result: Qualified (10th, 108 points)
- Final result: 25th, 46 points

Participation chronology

Finland was represented at the Eurovision Song Contest 2018 with the song "Monsters" written by Saara Aalto, Joy Deb, Linnea Deb, and Ki Fitzgerald, and performed by Aalto herself. The Finnish participating broadcaster, Yleisradio (Yle), organised the national final Uuden Musiikin Kilpailu 2018 in order to select its entry for the contest, after having previously selected the performer internally. Three songs were selected to compete in the national final on 3 March 2018 where the 50/50 combination of votes from eight international jury groups and votes from the public selected "Monsters" as the winning song.

Finland was drawn to compete in the first semi-final of the Eurovision Song Contest which took place on 8 May 2018. Performing during the show in position 15, "Monsters" was announced among the top 10 entries of the first semi-final and therefore qualified to compete in the final on 12 May. It was later revealed that Finland placed tenth out of the 19 participating countries in the semi-final with 108 points. In the final, Finland performed in position 17 and placed twenty-fifth out of the 26 participating countries, scoring 46 points.

== Background ==
Prior to the 2018 contest, Yleisradio (Yle) had participated in the Eurovision Song Contest representing Finland fifty-one times since its first entry in 1961. It has won the contest once in 2006 with the song "Hard Rock Hallelujah" performed by Lordi. In 2017, "Blackbird" performed by Norma John failed to qualify Finland to the final, placing twelfth in the semi-final.

As part of its duties as participating broadcaster, Yle organises the selection of its entry in the Eurovision Song Contest and broadcasts the event in the country. The broadcaster confirmed its intentions to participate at the 2018 contest on 28 January 2017. Yle had selected its entries for the contest through national final competitions that have varied in format over the years. Between 1961 and 2011, a selection show that was often titled Euroviisukarsinta highlighted that the purpose of the program was to select a song for Eurovision. However, since 2012, the broadcaster has organised the selection show Uuden Musiikin Kilpailu (UMK), which focuses on showcasing new music with the winning song being selected as the Finnish entry for that year. Along with its participation confirmation, the broadcaster also announced that its entry for the 2018 contest would be selected through Uuden Musiikin Kilpailu 2018. Initially announcing an open selection with two submission periods, the first which lasted between 28 January 2017 and 28 February 2017 and the second between 1 September 2017 and 4 September 2017, Yle ultimately opted to internally select the artist due to a lack of suitable performers for the songs selected from the 300 received submissions.

== Before Eurovision ==
=== Artist selection ===
Yle announced that they had internally selected singer Saara Aalto to represent Finland in Lisbon during a live streamed press conference on 7 November 2017, hosted by Krista Siegfrids, who represented Finland in 2013, and Mikko Silvennoinen. Aalto previously attempted to represent Finland at the Eurovision Song Contest in 2011 and 2016, both placing second in the national finals with the songs "Blessed with Love" and "No Fear", respectively. It was also announced during the press conference that her song would be selected through Uuden Musiikin Kilpailu 2018 with three songs competing.

=== Uuden Musiikin Kilpailu 2018 ===
Uuden Musiikin Kilpailu 2018 was the seventh edition of Uuden Musiikin Kilpailu (UMK), the music competition that selects Finland's entries for the Eurovision Song Contest. The three competing songs along with their promotional music videos were presented on 9, 16 and 23 February 2018, respectively, while the final took place on 3 March 2018 at the Espoo Metro Areena in Espoo and hosted by Krista Siegfrids with Christoffer Strandberg hosting from the green room. The show was broadcast on Yle TV1, online at yle.fi/umk and via radio with commentary in Swedish by Eva Frantz and Johan Lindroos on Yle X3M. All three competing songs were performed by Saara Aalto and "Monsters" was selected as the winning song by a 50/50 combination of public votes and eight international jury groups from the United Kingdom, Iceland, France, Estonia, Italy, Switzerland, Norway and Portugal. The viewers and the juries each had a total of 240 points to award. Each jury group distributed their points as follows: 8, 10 and 12 points. The viewer vote was based on the percentage of votes each song achieved through the following voting methods: telephone, SMS and online voting. For example, if a song gained 10% of the viewer vote, then that entry would be awarded 10% of 240 points rounded to the nearest integer: 24 points.

In addition to the performances of the competing songs, the interval act featured Melanie C performing her song "I Turn to You" and Krista Siegfrids performing the 1994 Finnish Eurovision entry "Bye Bye Baby" together with 1994 Finnish Eurovision entrants CatCat. The competition was watched by 730,000 viewers in Finland.

Final – 3 March 2018
| R/O | Song | Songwriter(s) | Jury | Televote | Total | Place |
|---|---|---|---|---|---|---|
| 1 | "Monsters" | Joy Deb, Linnea Deb, Ki Fitzgerald, Saara Aalto | 88 | 95 | 183 | 1 |
| 2 | "Domino" | Thomas G:son, Bobby Ljunggren, Johnny Sanchez, Will Taylor, Saara Aalto | 84 | 75 | 159 | 2 |
| 3 | "Queens" | Farley Arvidsson, Charlie Walshe, Tom Aspaul, Saara Aalto | 68 | 70 | 138 | 3 |

Detailed International Jury Votes
| R/O | Song | United Kingdom | Iceland | France | Estonia | Italy | Switzerland | Norway | Portugal | Total |
| R/O | Song | United Kingdom | Iceland | France | Estonia | Italy | Switzerland | Norway | Portugal | Total |
|---|---|---|---|---|---|---|---|---|---|---|
| 1 | "Monsters" | 12 | 10 | 12 | 10 | 12 | 10 | 12 | 10 | 88 |
| 2 | "Domino" | 10 | 12 | 10 | 12 | 8 | 12 | 8 | 12 | 84 |
| 3 | "Queens" | 8 | 8 | 8 | 8 | 10 | 8 | 10 | 8 | 68 |
International Jury Spokespersons
United Kingdom – William Lee Adams; Iceland – Hera Björk; France – Edoardo Grassi; Estonia – Lenna Kuurmaa; Italy – Kabir Naidoo; Switzerland – Reto Peritz; Norway – Stig Karlsen; Portugal – Suzy

=== Promotion ===
In the lead up to the Eurovision Song Contest on 11 April, Saara Aalto released an acoustic version of "Monsters" with lyrics in 34 official languages from all participating countries at the 2018 contest. Saara Aalto also made several appearances across Europe to specifically promote "Monsters" as the Finnish Eurovision entry. On 13 February, Aalto performed a modified version "Monsters" during the final of the Lithuanian Eurovision national final which contained one verse in Lithuanian. On 14 April, she performed during the Eurovision in Concert event which was held at the AFAS Live venue in Amsterdam, Netherlands and hosted by Edsilia Rombley and Cornald Maas. Between 5 and 25 April, Aalto took part in promotional activities in London, United Kingdom where she performed during the London Eurovision Party, which was held at the Café de Paris venue and hosted by Nicki French and Paddy O'Connell, and during her Eurovision Wonderland concert, which was held at the Under the Bridge venue.

== At Eurovision ==
According to Eurovision rules, all nations with the exceptions of the host country and the "Big Five" (France, Germany, Italy, Spain and the United Kingdom) are required to qualify from one of two semi-finals in order to compete for the final; the top ten countries from each semi-final progress to the final. The European Broadcasting Union (EBU) split up the competing countries into six different pots based on voting patterns from previous contests, with countries with favourable voting histories put into the same pot. On 29 January 2018, a special allocation draw was held which placed each country into one of the two semi-finals, as well as which half of the show they would perform in. Finland was placed into the first semi-final, held on 8 May 2018, and was scheduled to perform in the second half of the show.

Once all the competing songs for the 2018 contest had been released, the running order for the semi-finals was decided by the shows' producers rather than through another draw, so that similar songs were not placed next to each other. Finland was set to perform in position 15, following the entry from Greece and preceding the entry from Armenia.

The two semi-finals and the final were televised in Finland on Yle TV2 with a second audio program providing commentary in Finnish by Mikko Silvennoinen (joined by Saara Aalto for the second semi-final) and in Swedish by Eva Frantz and Johan Lindroos. The three shows were broadcast via radio with Finnish commentary by Anna Keränen (joined by Aija Puurtinen and Sami Sykkö for the final) on Yle Radio Suomi and with Swedish commentary by Eva Frantz and Johan Lindroos on Yle X3M. The Finnish spokesperson, who announced the top 12-point score awarded by the Finnish jury during the final, was Anna Abreu.

=== Semi-final ===
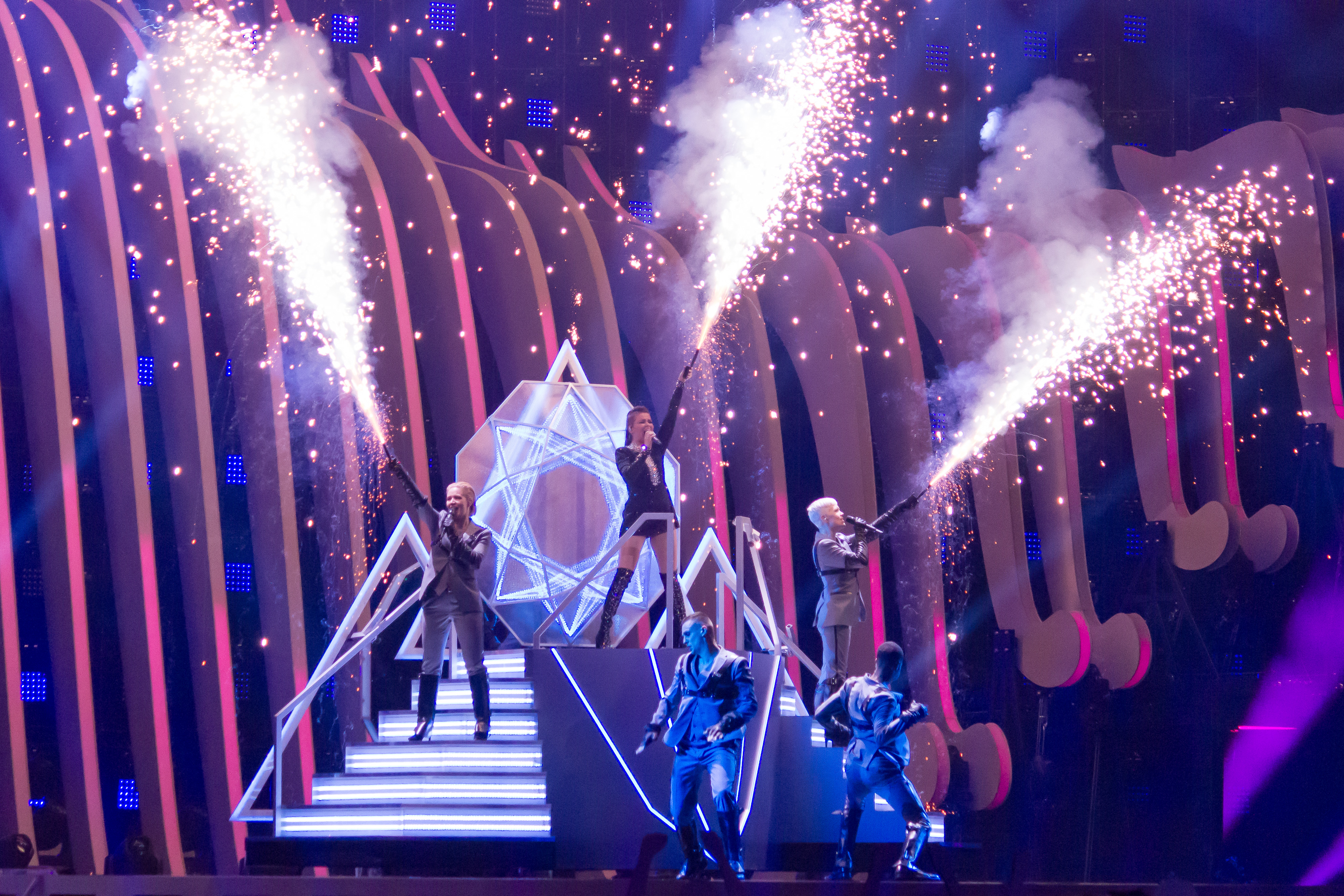
Saara Aalto during a rehearsal before the first semi-final

Saara Aalto took part in technical rehearsals on 30 April and 3 May, followed by dress rehearsals on 7 and 8 May. This included the jury show on 7 May where the professional juries of each country watched and voted on the competing entries.

The Finnish performance featured Saara Aalto performing in a short black dress and knee-high black boots joined by four dancers, two of them which also performed backing vocals. The performance began with Aalto on a revolving diamond-shaped wheel with two sides, one of them turning Aalto upside down. The stage colours were predominately pink and purple and the performance also featured pyrotechnic effects. The staging for the Finnish performance was created by Brian Friedman, while the choreographer was Lukas McFarlane. The four backing performers that joined Saara Aalto on stage were Heli Lyytikäinen, Kane Horn, Tuuli Ikonen and Yves Cueni. An off-stage backing vocalist, Teemu Roivainen, was also part of the performance.

At the end of the show, Finland was announced as having finished in the top 10 and subsequently qualifying for the grand final. It was later revealed that Finland placed tenth in the semi-final, receiving a total of 108 points: 73 points from the televoting and 35 points from the juries.

=== Final ===
Shortly after the first semi-final, a winners' press conference was held for the ten qualifying countries. As part of this press conference, the qualifying artists took part in a draw to determine which half of the grand final they would subsequently participate in. This draw was done in the order the countries were announced during the semi-final. Finland was drawn to compete in the second half, with Aalto joking that it continued her "curse of twos" - she finished second in The X Factor UK and in two Eurovision pre-selections, competed in the second half of the first semi-final, and were the second-to-last country announced as qualifying. Following this draw, the shows' producers decided upon the running order of the final, as they had done for the semi-finals. Finland was subsequently placed to perform in position 17, following the entry from Australia and before the entry from Bulgaria.

Saara Aalto once again took part in dress rehearsals on 11 and 12 May before the final, including the jury final where the professional juries cast their final votes before the live show. Saara Aalto performed a repeat of her semi-final performance during the final on 12 May. In continuation of the "curse of twos", Finland placed twenty-fifth (second last) in the final, scoring 46 points: 23 points from both the televoting and the juries.

=== Voting ===
Voting during the three shows involved each country awarding two sets of points from 1–8, 10 and 12: one from their professional jury and the other from televoting. Each nation's jury consisted of five music industry professionals who are citizens of the country they represent, with their names published before the contest to ensure transparency. This jury judged each entry based on: vocal capacity; the stage performance; the song's composition and originality; and the overall impression by the act. In addition, no member of a national jury was permitted to be related in any way to any of the competing acts in such a way that they cannot vote impartially and independently. The individual rankings of each jury member as well as the nation's televoting results were released shortly after the grand final.

Below is a breakdown of points awarded to Finland and awarded by Finland in the first semi-final and grand final of the contest, and the breakdown of the jury voting and televoting conducted during the two shows:

==== Points awarded to Finland ====
Points awarded to Finland (Semi-final 1)
| Score | Televote | Jury |
|---|---|---|
| 12 points | Estonia | |
| 10 points | Iceland | |
| 8 points | Albania | |
| 7 points | United Kingdom | Israel |
| 6 points | Ireland; Israel; Spain | |
| 5 points | Switzerland | Estonia; Ireland |
| 4 points | Portugal | Iceland |
| 3 points | Lithuania | Belarus; United Kingdom |
| 2 points | Belgium; Macedonia | Cyprus; Lithuania; Switzerland |
| 1 point | Bulgaria; Czech Republic | Bulgaria; Spain |

Points awarded to Finland (Final)
| Score | Televote | Jury |
|---|---|---|
| 12 points | | |
| 10 points | Estonia | |
| 8 points | | |
| 7 points | | |
| 6 points | Sweden | Israel |
| 5 points | | Macedonia |
| 4 points | Australia | United Kingdom |
| 3 points | Iceland | Czech Republic; Sweden |
| 2 points | | Estonia |
| 1 point | | |

==== Points awarded by Finland ====
Points awarded by Finland (Semi-final 1)
| Score | Televote | Jury |
|---|---|---|
| 12 points | Estonia | Israel |
| 10 points | Israel | Bulgaria |
| 8 points | Austria | Austria |
| 7 points | Czech Republic | Cyprus |
| 6 points | Ireland | Albania |
| 5 points | Cyprus | Belgium |
| 4 points | Switzerland | Ireland |
| 3 points | Belarus | Armenia |
| 2 points | Lithuania | Lithuania |
| 1 point | Albania | Switzerland |

Points awarded by Finland (Final)
| Score | Televote | Jury |
|---|---|---|
| 12 points | Estonia | Israel |
| 10 points | Denmark | Bulgaria |
| 8 points | Hungary | Sweden |
| 7 points | Israel | Austria |
| 6 points | Italy | Cyprus |
| 5 points | Czech Republic | France |
| 4 points | France | Italy |
| 3 points | Austria | Denmark |
| 2 points | Netherlands | Ireland |
| 1 point | Cyprus | Germany |

==== Detailed voting results ====
The following members comprised the Finnish jury:

- Petri Laaksonen (jury chairperson) – singer-songwriter, composer of the 1985 and 1987 Finnish contest entries
- Laura Vähähyyppä – radio DJ, journalist
- Aija Puurtinen – Doctor of Music, singer, musician
- Matias Keskiruokanen – producer, composer
- Vilma Alina Lähteenmäki (Vilma Alina) – singer-songwriter

Detailed voting results from Finland (Semi-final 1)
| R/O | Country | Jury | | | | | | | Televote | |
| R/O | Country | L. Vähähyyppä | A. Puurtinen | P. Laaksonen | M. Keskiruokanen | V. Alina | Rank | Points | Rank | Points |
|---|---|---|---|---|---|---|---|---|---|---|
| 01 | Azerbaijan | 10 | 15 | 10 | 13 | 16 | 14 | | 16 | |
| 02 | Iceland | 13 | 12 | 6 | 12 | 9 | 13 | | 13 | |
| 03 | Albania | 4 | 7 | 4 | 16 | 6 | 5 | 6 | 10 | 1 |
| 04 | Belgium | 6 | 3 | 8 | 7 | 12 | 6 | 5 | 14 | |
| 05 | Czech Republic | 9 | 14 | 13 | 8 | 7 | 12 | | 4 | 7 |
| 06 | Lithuania | 14 | 6 | 9 | 6 | 11 | 9 | 2 | 9 | 2 |
| 07 | Israel | 1 | 1 | 3 | 1 | 1 | 1 | 12 | 2 | 10 |
| 08 | Belarus | 17 | 17 | 12 | 18 | 18 | 17 | | 8 | 3 |
| 09 | Estonia | 18 | 13 | 18 | 10 | 13 | 16 | | 1 | 12 |
| 10 | Bulgaria | 2 | 2 | 2 | 2 | 5 | 2 | 10 | 12 | |
| 11 | Macedonia | 16 | 18 | 17 | 17 | 17 | 18 | | 18 | |
| 12 | Croatia | 12 | 16 | 16 | 14 | 10 | 15 | | 17 | |
| 13 | Austria | 3 | 4 | 1 | 3 | 4 | 3 | 8 | 3 | 8 |
| 14 | Greece | 11 | 10 | 5 | 11 | 15 | 11 | | 11 | |
| 15 | Finland | | | | | | | | | |
| 16 | Armenia | 7 | 11 | 7 | 5 | 14 | 8 | 3 | 15 | |
| 17 | Switzerland | 8 | 9 | 11 | 9 | 8 | 10 | 1 | 7 | 4 |
| 18 | Ireland | 5 | 8 | 15 | 15 | 3 | 7 | 4 | 5 | 6 |
| 19 | Cyprus | 15 | 5 | 14 | 4 | 2 | 4 | 7 | 6 | 5 |

Detailed voting results from Finland (Final)
| R/O | Country | Jury | | | | | | | Televote | |
| R/O | Country | L. Vähähyyppä | A. Puurtinen | P. Laaksonen | M. Keskiruokanen | V. Alina | Rank | Points | Rank | Points |
|---|---|---|---|---|---|---|---|---|---|---|
| 01 | Ukraine | 21 | 21 | 21 | 20 | 19 | 23 | | 19 | |
| 02 | Spain | 22 | 14 | 18 | 7 | 16 | 15 | | 24 | |
| 03 | Slovenia | 23 | 24 | 25 | 24 | 25 | 25 | | 22 | |
| 04 | Lithuania | 13 | 13 | 19 | 8 | 15 | 14 | | 14 | |
| 05 | Austria | 5 | 2 | 2 | 6 | 7 | 4 | 7 | 8 | 3 |
| 06 | Estonia | 20 | 12 | 17 | 21 | 22 | 18 | | 1 | 12 |
| 07 | Norway | 10 | 16 | 7 | 16 | 23 | 13 | | 11 | |
| 08 | Portugal | 24 | 15 | 24 | 22 | 14 | 20 | | 23 | |
| 09 | United Kingdom | 11 | 17 | 13 | 18 | 18 | 16 | | 21 | |
| 10 | Serbia | 19 | 19 | 22 | 23 | 20 | 24 | | 25 | |
| 11 | Germany | 9 | 8 | 8 | 11 | 11 | 10 | 1 | 16 | |
| 12 | Albania | 14 | 11 | 11 | 13 | 10 | 12 | | 17 | |
| 13 | France | 16 | 6 | 4 | 5 | 1 | 6 | 5 | 7 | 4 |
| 14 | Czech Republic | 15 | 7 | 12 | 12 | 13 | 11 | | 6 | 5 |
| 15 | Denmark | 4 | 20 | 3 | 15 | 9 | 8 | 3 | 2 | 10 |
| 16 | Australia | 25 | 22 | 16 | 14 | 21 | 21 | | 18 | |
| 17 | Finland | | | | | | | | | |
| 18 | Bulgaria | 2 | 5 | 1 | 4 | 6 | 2 | 10 | 20 | |
| 19 | Moldova | 18 | 25 | 14 | 19 | 24 | 22 | | 13 | |
| 20 | Sweden | 3 | 4 | 6 | 3 | 3 | 3 | 8 | 12 | |
| 21 | Hungary | 12 | 23 | 23 | 25 | 12 | 17 | | 3 | 8 |
| 22 | Israel | 1 | 1 | 10 | 1 | 2 | 1 | 12 | 4 | 7 |
| 23 | Netherlands | 17 | 18 | 20 | 17 | 17 | 19 | | 9 | 2 |
| 24 | Ireland | 7 | 10 | 15 | 9 | 8 | 9 | 2 | 15 | |
| 25 | Cyprus | 6 | 3 | 9 | 2 | 5 | 5 | 6 | 10 | 1 |
| 26 | Italy | 8 | 9 | 5 | 10 | 4 | 7 | 4 | 5 | 6 |
