= Apollo (Timebelle song) =

2017 song by Timebelle

Single by Timebelle
- Released: 10 March 2017
- Genre: Pop
- Length: 2:59
- Label: Independent
- Songwriters: Elias Näslin; Nicolas Günthardt; Alessandra Günthardt
- Producers: Elias Näslin; Nicolas Günthardt; Alessandra Günthardt

Timebelle singles chronology
"Are You Ready?" (2015)	"Apollo" (2017)	"Come Around" (2017)

Eurovision Song Contest 2017 entry
- Country: Switzerland
- Artist: Timebelle
- Language: English
- Composers: Elias Näslin; Nicolas Günthardt; Alessandra Günthardt
- Lyricists: Elias Näslin; Nicolas Günthardt; Alessandra Günthardt

Finals performance
- Semi-final result: 12th
- Semi-final points: 97

Entry chronology
- ◄ "The Last of Our Kind" (2016)
- "Stones" (2018) ►

"Apollo" is an English-language song performed by Swiss band Timebelle. The song represented Switzerland in the Eurovision Song Contest 2017. It was written by Elias Näslin, Nicolas Günthardt, and Alessandra Günthardt. The song was released as a digital download on 10 March 2017.

== Eurovision Song Contest ==
Originally, the song was submitted to the Azerbaijani internal selection for the 2015 contest, where it entered the final round of auditions performed by Narmina Behbudova and finished in second place behind "Hour of the Wolf" performed by Elnur Hüseynov.

On 5 December 2016, Timebelle was announced as one of the six competing artists in ESC 2017 – Die Entscheidungsshow, Switzerland's national final for the Eurovision Song Contest 2017, with "Apollo". They performed last during the final, held on 5 February 2017, and won the competition with nearly 48% of the public vote. Switzerland competed in the second half of the second semi-final at the Eurovision Song Contest, but failed to qualify for the final.

== Track listing ==
Digital download
No.	Title	Length
1.	"Apollo" (Main)	2:59
2.	"Apollo" (Singback)	2:59

Other versions

- 7th Heaven (club mix) - 5:48
- 7th Heaven (radio edit) - 3:27

== Charts ==
Chart (2017)	Peak position
Switzerland (Schweizer Hitparade)	37

== Release history ==
Region	Date	Format	Label
Worldwide	10 March 2017	Digital download	Independent
