= Timebelle =

Pop music band from Switzerland

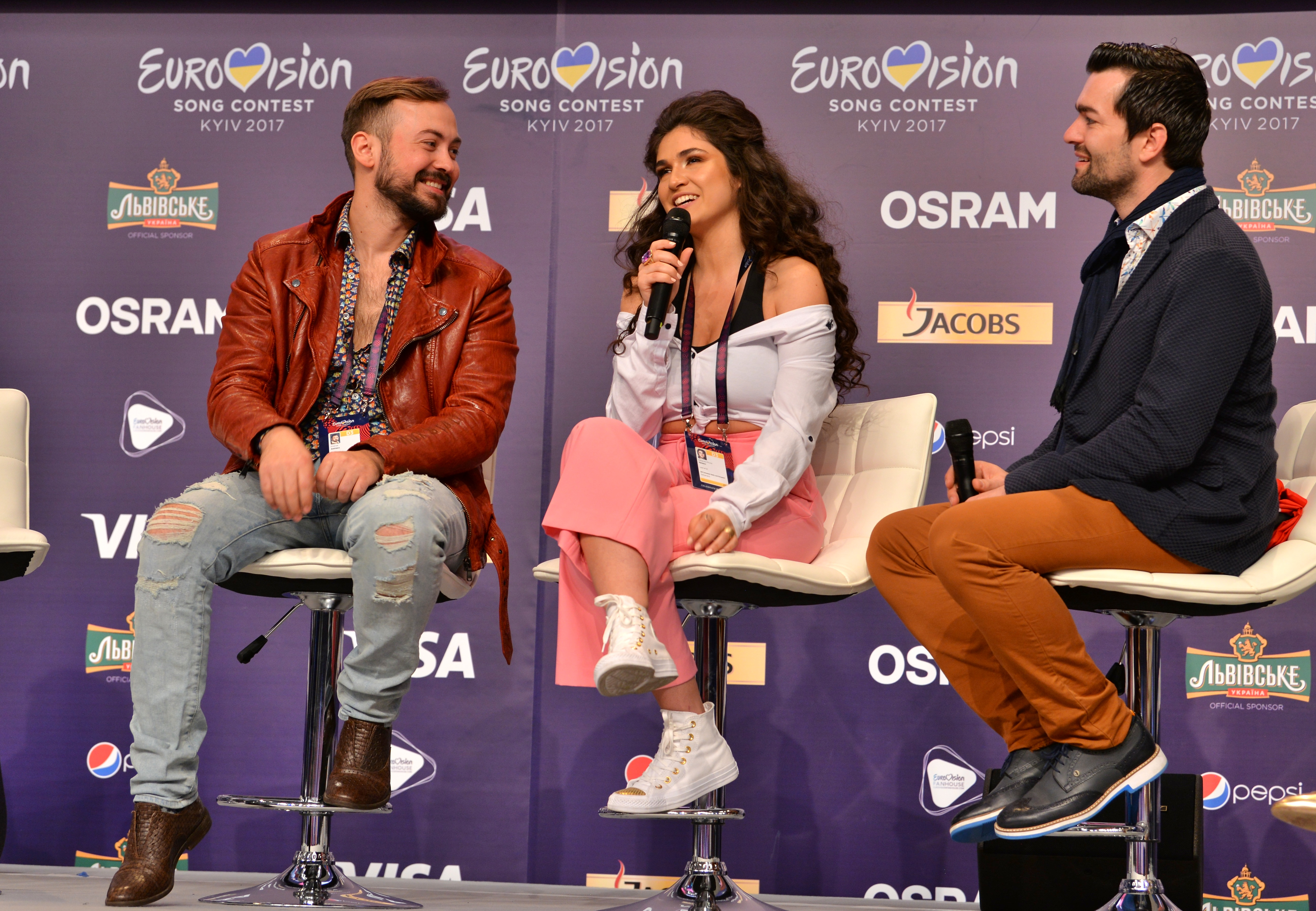
- Timebelle in Kyiv 2017

Background information
- Origin: Bern, Switzerland
- Genres: Pop
- Members: Miruna Mănescu; Samuel Forster; Emanuel Daniel Andriescu
- Past members: Rade Mijatović; Christoph Siegrist; Sándor Török

Timebelle is a Swiss-Romanian band from Bern, currently consisting of lead vocalist Miruna Mănescu, drummer Samuel Forster, and multi-instrumentalist Emanuel Daniel Andriescu. Past members include accordionist Rade Mijatović, guitarist Christoph Siegrist, and bassist Sándor Török. The band was formed as a five-member boyband while its members were students at the University of Bern. Shortly after, Mănescu was added to the group as a lead singer by their Romanian producer Mihai Alexandru. The name of the band is derived from the Zytglogge which is one of the main sights of Bern. While the band was formed in and is based in Switzerland, its members have hailed from Romania, Hungary, and Serbia, in addition to Switzerland.

The band represented Switzerland in the Eurovision Song Contest 2017 with the song "Apollo" placing 12th in the 2nd Semi Final. They previously attempted to represent Switzerland in the Eurovision Song Contest 2015 with the song "Singing About Love", but failed, placing second in the Swiss national final.

== Members ==
=== Current ===
- Miruna Mănescu – lead vocals (from Romania)
- Samuel Forster – drums (from Switzerland)
- Emanuel Daniel Andriescu – saxophone, clarinet, piano (from Romania)

=== Former ===
- Rade Mijatović – accordion (from Serbia)
- Christoph Siegrist – guitar (from Switzerland)
- Sándor Török – bass (from Hungary)

== Discography ==
=== Extended plays ===
Title	Details
Desperado	Released: 10 October 2015; Label: Self-released; Formats: digital download

=== Singles ===
Title	Year	Peak chart positions	Album
Title	Year	SWI	Album
"Singing About Love"	2015	—	Non-album single
"Desperado"	2015	—	Desperado
"Are You Ready?"	2015	—	Desperado
"Apollo"	2017	37	Non-album single
"Come Around"	2017	—	Non-album single
"Heartache" (featuring Soundland)	2018	—	Non-album single
"Tócame" (featuring SunStroke Project)	2018	—	Non-album single
"Movin On" (featuring Soundland)	2019	—	Non-album single
"Black Sea"	2019	—	Non-album single
"Beautiful People" (featuring Alizé Oswald)	2020	—	Non-album single
"Rápido" (featuring Alejandro Reyes)	2020	—	Non-album single
"Dopamina"	2021	—	Non-album single
"About Us"	2021	—	Non-album single
"No Se Puede"	2021	—	Non-album single
"Barba" (featuring Alejandro Reyes)	2021	—	Non-album single
"—" denotes a recording that did not chart or was not released in that territory.

Awards and achievements
Preceded by Rykka with "The Last of Our Kind"	Switzerland in the Eurovision Song Contest; 2017	Succeeded by Zibbz with "Stones"
