= Jean-Marc Richard (TV and radio presenter) =

Swiss radio and television personality (born 1960)

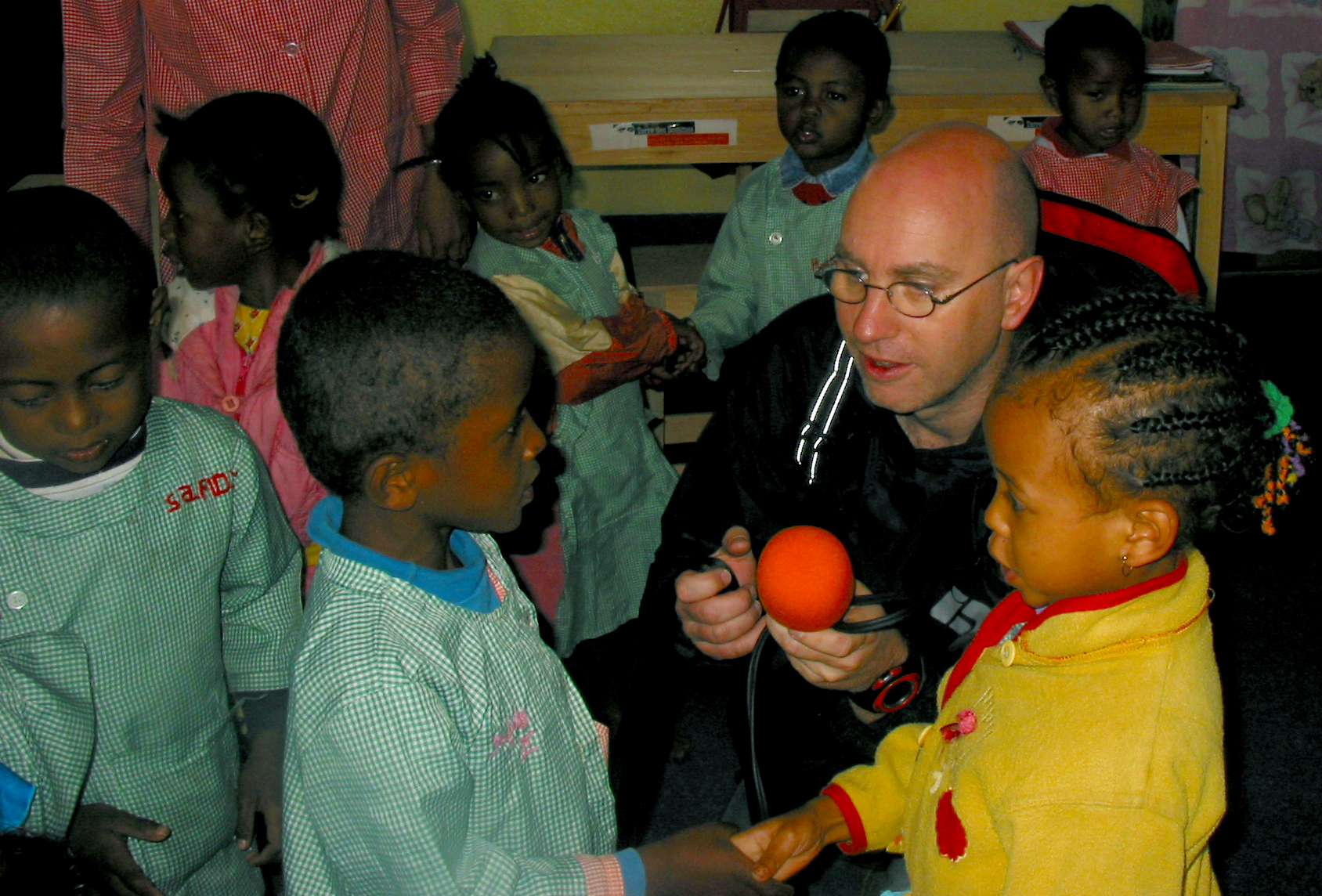
Jean-Marc Richard interviews children from the CREN of Madagascar.jpg

Jean-Marc Richard (born 18 September 1960 in Lausanne) is a Swiss radio and television personality, best known for his work with Radio télévision suisse.

== Career ==
Since 1993, Richard has been the Swiss French commentator for the Eurovision Song Contest. Richard was unable to commentate on the 1996 and 1997 Contests, and Pierre Grandjean filled in; however he returned to commentate on the 1998 contest. Richard was absent again in 2001 and 2002, this time replaced by Phil Mundwiller. Since 2003, Richard has co-commentated the event with other presenters, with Nicolas Tanner joining him since 2008. He stepped down from the role following the 2025 contest in Basel.

Currently he hosts various programmes broadcast on the Swiss French television station Télévision suisse romande including Miss Switzerland and various music competitions. He is married and has several children, he is a supporter of the foundation Terre des hommes.
