= Germany in the Eurovision Song Contest 2018 =

- Eurovision Song Contest 2018
- Participating broadcaster: ARD (Note: Arbeitsgemeinschaft der öffentlich-rechtlichen Rundfunkanstalten der Bundesrepublik Deutschland) – Norddeutscher Rundfunk (NDR)
- Country: Germany
- Selection process: Unser Lied für Lissabon
- Selection date: 22 February 2018

Competing entry
- Song: "You Let Me Walk Alone"
- Artist: Michael Schulte
- Songwriters: Michael Schulte; Thomas Stengaard; Nisse Ingwersen; Nina Müller

Placement
- Final result: 4th, 340 points

Participation chronology

Germany was represented at the Eurovision Song Contest 2018 with the song "You Let Me Walk Alone" written by Michael Schulte, Thomas Stengaard, Nisse Ingwersen and Nina Müller, and performed by Michael Schulte. The German entry for the 2018 contest in Lisbon, Portugal was selected through the national final Unser Lied für Lissabon, organised by the German broadcaster ARD in collaboration with Norddeutscher Rundfunk (NDR). The national final took place on 22 February 2018 and featured six competing acts with the winner selected by the votes of a 100-member Eurovision panel, a 20-member international jury panel and a public televote. "You Let Me Walk Alone" performed by Michael Schulte was selected as the German entry for Lisbon after gaining the most points following the combination of votes.

As a member of the "Big Five", Germany automatically qualified to compete in the final of the Eurovision Song Contest. Performing in position 11, Germany placed fourth out of the 26 participating countries with 340 points.

== Background ==
Prior to the 2018 contest, Germany had participated in the Eurovision Song Contest sixty-one times since its debut as one of seven countries to take part in 1956. Germany has won the contest on two occasions: in 1982 with the song "Ein bißchen Frieden" performed by Nicole and in 2010 with the song "Satellite" performed by Lena. Germany, to this point, has been noted for having competed in the contest more than any other country; they have competed in every contest since the first edition in 1956 except for the 1996 contest when the nation was eliminated in a pre-contest elimination round. In 2017, the German entry "Perfect Life" performed by Levina placed twenty-fifth out of twenty-six competing songs and scoring six points.

The German national broadcaster, ARD, broadcasts the event within Germany and delegates the selection of the nation's entry to the regional broadcaster Norddeutscher Rundfunk (NDR). NDR confirmed that Germany would participate in the 2018 Eurovision Song Contest on 16 May 2017. Since 2013, NDR had set up national finals with several artists to choose both the song and performer to compete at Eurovision for Germany. On 8 June 2017, the broadcaster announced that they would organise a multi-artist national final to select the German entry.

== Before Eurovision ==
=== Unser Lied für Lissabon ===
Unser Lied für Lissabon (English: Our Song for Lisbon) was the competition that selected Germany's entry for the Eurovision Song Contest 2018. The competition took place on 22 February 2018 at the Studio Berlin Adlershof in Berlin, hosted by Linda Zervakis and Elton. The national final was co-produced by the production companies Kimmig Entertainment and Lodge of Levity, after collaboration with the company Brainpool terminated after seven years. Six acts competed during the show with the winner being selected through a combination of votes from a 100-member Eurovision panel, a 20-member international jury panel and a public televote. The show was broadcast on Das Erste and One as well as online via the broadcaster's Eurovision Song Contest website eurovision.de. The national final was watched by 3.17 million viewers in Germany with a market share of 9.9%.

==== Competing entries ====
Interested performers were able to apply by submitting an online application between 27 October 2017 and 6 November 2017. Additional artists were also invited by NDR and proposed by composers, producers and record companies. By the end of the process, it was announced that over 4,000 applications were received and 211 performers were longlisted by a panel of music experts. A Eurovision panel, consisting of 100 German television viewers put together according to selected criteria in cooperation with Simon-Kucher and Digame through surveys on social media in order to reflect the taste of the wider European audience, shortlisted 17 artists to go through a workshop where they received vocal coaching and choreography training. 90-second videos of each artist during the workshop were recorded and presented to the Eurovision panel and an international jury panel that ultimately selected the six competing artists. The international jury consisted of 20 members who had been national juries for their respective countries at the Eurovision Song Contest. The six participating acts were announced on 29 December 2017. In January 2018, the six artists worked with 15 German and international composers and lyricists in a three-day songwriting camp to create their candidate songs for the national final. The participating songs were announced on 13 February 2018.

Shortlisted acts
- Benedikt Köstler
- Boris Alexander Stein
- Danyal Demir
- Ivy Quainoo
- Juan Geck
- LaBrassBanda
- Lara Loft
- Laura Aubrey Wanja
- Michael Schulte
- Natia Todua
- Ryk
- Steal a Taxi
- Vinh Khuat
- Voxxclub
- Xavier Darcy
- ZweiLand

Artist	Song	Songwriter(s)
Ivy Quainoo	"House on Fire"	Jörgen Elofsson, Ali Tamposi
Michael Schulte	"You Let Me Walk Alone"	Michael Schulte, Thomas Stengaard, Nisse Ingwersen, Nina Müller
Natia Todua	"My Own Way"	Loren Nine Geerts, Ricardo Bettiol, Martin Gallop, Jaro Omar
Ryk	"You and I"	Rick Jurthe
Voxxclub	"I mog Di so"	Merty Bert, Mike Busse, Philipp Klemz, Lennard Oestmann, Joe Walter, Martin Simma
Xavier Darcy	"Jonah"	Xavier Darcy, Loren Nine Geerts, Axel Ehnström, Thomas Stengaard

==== Final ====
The televised final took place on 22 February 2018. The winner, "You Let Me Walk Alone" performed by Michael Schulte, was selected through a combination of votes from a 100-member Eurovision panel (1/3), a 20-member international jury panel (1/3) and public televoting which included options for landline and SMS voting (1/3). In addition to the performances of the competing entries, German singer Mike Singer performed his song "Deja Vu". 427,519 televotes were cast during the show.

Final – 22 February 2018
R/O	Artist	Song	Eurovision Panel		Jury		Televote		Total	Place
R/O	Artist	Song	Votes	Points	Votes	Points	Votes	Points	Total	Place
1	Natia Todua	"My Own Way"	630	5	122	6	37,343	6	17	6
2	Ryk	"You and I"	931	10	169	8	35,700	5	23	3
3	Voxxclub	"I mog Di so"	718	6	118	5	121,336	10	21	5
4	Xavier Darcy	"Jonah"	770	8	185	10	45,010	7	25	2
5	Ivy Quainoo	"House on Fire"	736	7	148	7	47,639	8	22	4
6	Michael Schulte	"You Let Me Walk Alone"	1,015	12	218	12	140,491	12	36	1

Detailed International Jury Votes
R/O	Song	Florent Luyckx	Einar Bardarson	Typh Barrow	Mark De-Lisser	Henrik Johnsson	Maria Marcus	Filip Adamo	Argyro Christodoulides	Gore Melian	Margaret Berger	Deivydas Zvonkus	Tinkara Kovač	Anca Lupes	Bruno Berberes	Ruth Lorenzo	Ferris MC	Helga Möller	Grzegorz Urban	Rennie Mirro	Sasha Saedi	Total
R/O	Song	NED	ISL	BEL	GBR	SWE	SWE	SWE	CYP	ARM	NOR	LTU	SLO	ROU	FRA	ESP	GER	ISL	POL	SWE	AUT	Total
1	"My Own Way"	5	8	6	5	7	7	7	5	6	6	6	6	7	6	5	6	5	7	6	6	122
2	"You and I"	10	7	10	6	10	10	10	7	8	7	12	8	10	7	6	10	10	6	7	8	169
3	"I mog Di so"	6	5	5	10	6	5	5	6	5	5	5	5	6	10	7	5	7	5	5	5	118
4	"Jonah"	8	10	7	8	12	8	12	10	10	12	8	10	5	5	10	12	6	10	12	10	185
5	"House on Fire"	7	6	8	7	5	6	6	8	7	8	7	7	8	12	8	7	8	8	8	7	148
6	"You Let Me Walk Alone"	12	12	12	12	8	12	8	12	12	10	10	12	12	8	12	8	12	12	10	12	218

Members of the International Jury
Name	Country	Profession
Florent Luyckx	Netherlands	Radio executive
Einar Bardarson	Iceland	Composer, music producer, concertist, artist agent
Typh Barrow	Belgium	Singer, composer
Mark de Lisser	United Kingdom	Vocal coach
Henrik Johnsson	Sweden	Television presenter and producer
Maria Marcus	Sweden	Music producer, songwriter
Filip Adamo	Sweden	Product manager at record label
Argyro Christodoulidou	Cyprus	Composer, songwriter
Gore Melian	Armenia	Singer, songwriter, producer
Margaret Berger	Norway	Singer, songwriter, represented Norway in the 2013 contest
Rafailas Karpis	Lithuania	Opera singer
Tinkara Kovač	Slovenia	Singer, flautist, represented Slovenia in the 2014 contest
Anca Lupes	Romania	Music manager
Bruno Berberes	France	Casting director, producer, composer, coach
Ruth Lorenzo	Spain	Singer, songwriter, represented Spain in the 2014 contest
Ferris MC	Germany	Musician, rapper, actor
Helga Möller	Iceland	Singer, represented Iceland in the 1986 contest as part of ICY
Grzegorz Urban	Poland	Composer, arranger, pianist
Rennie Mirro	Sweden	Dancer, choreographer, actor
Sasha Saedi	Austria	Music manager

=== Promotion ===
Michael Schulte made several appearances across Europe to specifically promote "You Let Me Walk Alone" as the German Eurovision entry. On 5 April, Schulte performed during the London Eurovision Party, which was held at the Café de Paris venue in London, United Kingdom and hosted by Nicki French and Paddy O'Connell. On 14 April, Schulte performed during the Eurovision in Concert event which was held at the AFAS Live venue in Amsterdam, Netherlands and hosted by Edsilia Rombley and Cornald Maas. On 21 April, Schulte performed during the ESPreParty event which was held at the Sala La Riviera venue in Madrid, Spain and hosted by Soraya Arnelas.

== At Eurovision ==
According to Eurovision rules, all nations with the exceptions of the host country and the "Big Five" (France, Germany, Italy, Spain and the United Kingdom) are required to compete in one of two semi-finals, and qualify in order to participate in the final; the top ten countries from each semi-final progress to the final. As a member of the "Big Five", Germany automatically qualified to compete in the final on 12 May 2018. In addition to their participation in the final, Germany is also required to broadcast and vote in one of the two semi-finals. During the semi-final allocation draw on 29 January 2018, Germany was assigned to broadcast and vote in the second semi-final on 10 May 2018.

In Germany, the two semi-finals and the final were broadcast on One. ARD also broadcast the final on Das Erste and Deutsche Welle. All broadcasts featured commentary by Peter Urban. The final was watched by 7.87 million viewers in Germany, which meant a market share of 33.4 per cent. The German spokesperson, who announced the top 12-point score awarded by the German jury during the final, was Barbara Schöneberger.

=== Final ===
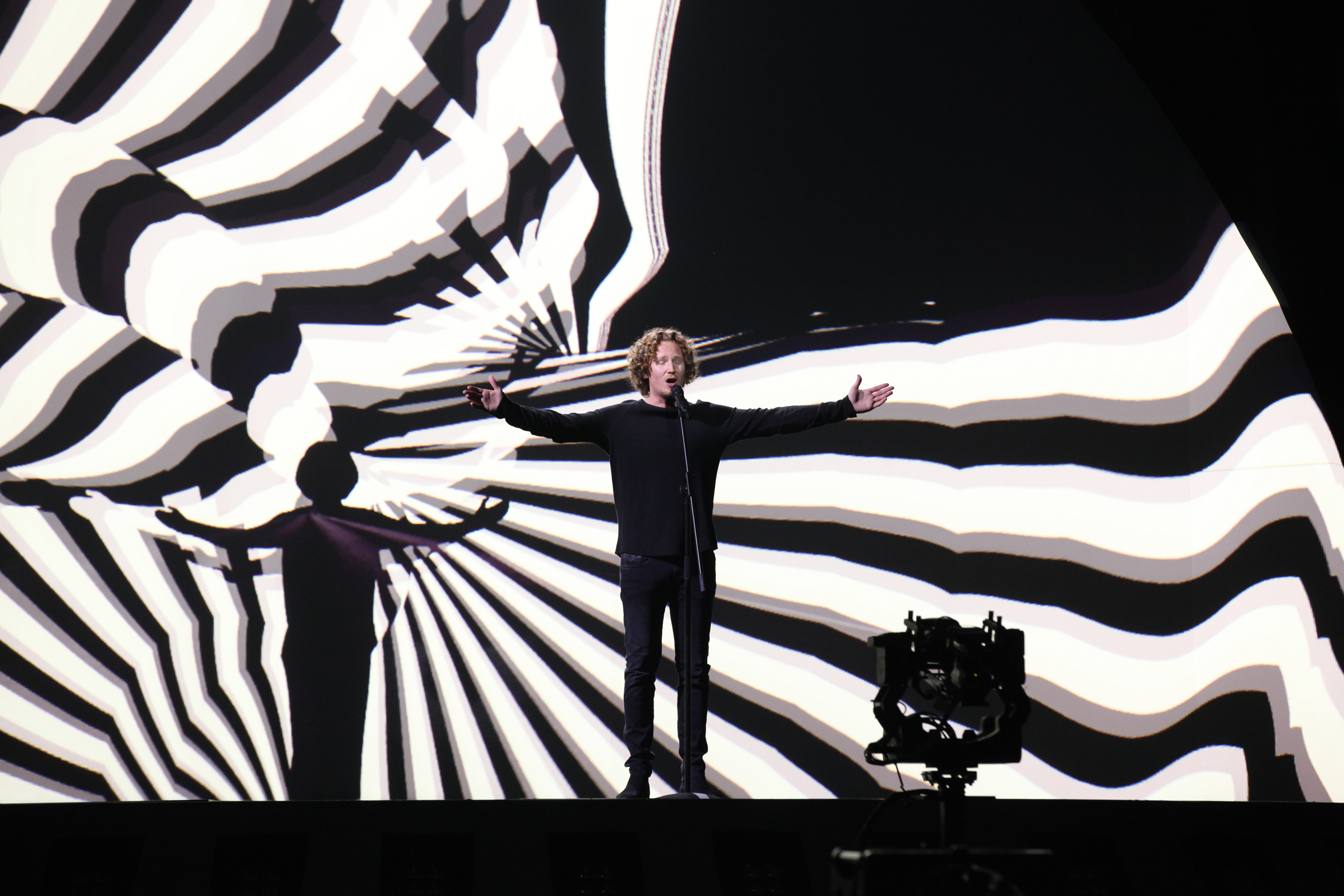
Michael Schulte during a rehearsal before the final

Michael Schulte took part in technical rehearsals on 4 and 6 May, followed by dress rehearsals on 9, 11 and 12 May. This included the semi-final jury show on 9 May where an extended clip of the German performance was filmed for broadcast during the live show on 10 May and the jury final on 11 May where the professional juries of each country watched and voted on the competing entries. After technical rehearsals were held on 6 May, the "Big Five" countries and host country Portugal held a press conference. As part of this press conference, the artists took part in a draw to determine which half of the grand final they would subsequently participate in. Germany was drawn to compete in the first half. Following the conclusion of the second semi-final, the shows' producers decided upon the running order of the final. The running order for the semi-finals and final was decided by the shows' producers rather than through another draw, so that similar songs were not placed next to each other. Germany was subsequently placed to perform in position 11, following the entry from Serbia and before the entry from Albania.

The German performance featured Michael Schulte performing on stage in a black sweater, dark jeans and white trainers. The staging presentation included Schulte in front of a LED projection screen that displayed hand-drawn illustrations, images of people with their fathers and a series of vector animations in white, black and red colours which included several of the lyrics from the song's chorus and an infinite series of Schulte with white outlines against a black background when he spread his arms as the song progressed. Germany placed fourth in the final, scoring 340 points: 136 points from the televoting and 204 points from the juries.

=== Voting ===
Voting during the three shows involved each country awarding two sets of points from 1-8, 10 and 12: one from their professional jury and the other from televoting. Each nation's jury consisted of five music industry professionals who are citizens of the country they represent, with their names published before the contest to ensure transparency. This jury judged each entry based on: vocal capacity; the stage performance; the song's composition and originality; and the overall impression by the act. In addition, no member of a national jury was permitted to be related in any way to any of the competing acts in such a way that they cannot vote impartially and independently. The individual rankings of each jury member as well as the nation's televoting results were released shortly after the grand final.

Below is a breakdown of points awarded to Germany and awarded by Germany in the second semi-final and grand final of the contest, and the breakdown of the jury voting and televoting conducted during the two shows:

==== Points awarded to Germany ====
Points awarded to Germany (Final)
Score	Televote	Jury
12 points	Denmark; Netherlands	Denmark; Netherlands; Norway; Switzerland
10 points		Australia; Austria; Italy; Poland; San Marino; Serbia
8 points	Albania; Iceland; Ireland; Portugal	France; Ireland
7 points		Georgia; Spain
6 points	Austria; Norway; Spain; Switzerland	Albania; Bulgaria; Estonia; Iceland
5 points	Sweden	Armenia; Belgium; Israel; Lithuania
4 points	Malta; Moldova; Romania; San Marino; Slovenia	Moldova; Romania; Russia
3 points	Azerbaijan; Croatia; Cyprus; Czech Republic; Israel; Italy; United Kingdom	Latvia; Macedonia
2 points	Australia; Belgium; Greece; Lithuania	Azerbaijan
1 point	Hungary; Poland	Finland; Sweden

==== Points awarded by Germany ====
Points awarded by Germany (Semi-final 2)
Score	Televote	Jury
12 points	Poland	Sweden
10 points	Denmark	Latvia
8 points	Hungary	Australia
7 points	Australia	Netherlands
6 points	Serbia	Malta
5 points	Moldova	Norway
4 points	Norway	Moldova
3 points	Netherlands	Slovenia
2 points	Slovenia	Poland
1 point	Ukraine	Serbia

Points awarded by Germany (Final)
Score	Televote	Jury
12 points	Italy	Sweden
10 points	Israel	Austria
8 points	Czech Republic	Ireland
7 points	Ireland	Australia
6 points	Cyprus	Spain
5 points	Austria	Netherlands
4 points	Lithuania	Lithuania
3 points	Denmark	Cyprus
2 points	Hungary	Estonia
1 point	United Kingdom	Israel

==== Detailed voting results ====
The following members comprised the German jury:

- Mary Roos (jury chairperson) – singer, represented Germany in the 1972 and 1984 contests
- Max Giesinger – singer-songwriter
- Sascha Stadler – artist manager
- Mike Singer – singer-songwriter
- Charlotte Rezbach (Lotte) – singer-songwriter

Detailed voting results from Germany (Semi-final 2)
R/O	Country	Jury							Televote	
R/O	Country	M. Roos	M. Giesinger	S. Stadler	M. Singer	Lotte	Rank	Points	Rank	Points
01	Norway	6	14	4	8	7	6	5	7	4
02	Romania	14	10	10	13	14	13		13	
03	Serbia	11	15	12	11	6	10	1	5	6
04	San Marino	9	17	18	18	17	17		16	
05	Denmark	7	12	14	14	9	11		2	10
06	Russia	12	13	16	10	15	15		12	
07	Moldova	5	11	8	12	4	7	4	6	5
08	Netherlands	8	3	5	4	3	4	7	8	3
09	Australia	3	4	3	3	2	3	8	4	7
10	Georgia	13	9	13	15	12	14		15	
11	Poland	10	7	9	6	18	9	2	1	12
12	Malta	4	6	6	5	11	5	6	17	
13	Hungary	15	16	17	17	8	16		3	8
14	Latvia	2	2	2	2	5	2	10	14	
15	Sweden	1	1	1	1	1	1	12	11	
16	Montenegro	18	18	15	16	13	18		18	
17	Slovenia	16	5	7	7	10	8	3	9	2
18	Ukraine	17	8	11	9	16	12		10	1

Detailed voting results from Germany (Final)
R/O	Country	Jury							Televote	
R/O	Country	M. Roos	M. Giesinger	S. Stadler	M. Singer	Lotte	Rank	Points	Rank	Points
01	Ukraine	8	9	12	7	19	11		20	
02	Spain	7	4	6	6	7	5	6	25	
03	Slovenia	11	11	13	17	21	14		24	
04	Lithuania	16	7	7	10	6	7	4	7	4
05	Austria	4	3	2	3	2	2	10	6	5
06	Estonia	19	8	20	9	3	9	2	19	
07	Norway	9	23	17	25	16	18		14	
08	Portugal	24	18	14	13	8	13		18	
09	United Kingdom	15	13	19	18	20	20		10	1
10	Serbia	22	17	24	15	17	21		13	
11	Germany									
12	Albania	25	14	18	8	15	16		12	
13	France	12	12	15	12	13	12		16	
14	Czech Republic	14	20	9	23	12	15		3	8
15	Denmark	13	21	23	20	22	22		8	3
16	Australia	2	5	4	4	4	4	7	17	
17	Finland	18	25	25	24	25	25		23	
18	Bulgaria	20	24	22	19	24	24		22	
19	Moldova	21	22	11	22	14	19		15	
20	Sweden	1	1	1	1	1	1	12	21	
21	Hungary	23	19	21	21	18	23		9	2
22	Israel	5	16	8	11	11	10	1	2	10
23	Netherlands	10	6	5	14	10	6	5	11	
24	Ireland	3	2	3	2	5	3	8	4	7
25	Cyprus	6	10	10	5	23	8	3	5	6
26	Italy	17	15	16	16	9	17		1	12
