= Michael Schulte (singer) =

German singer-songwriter

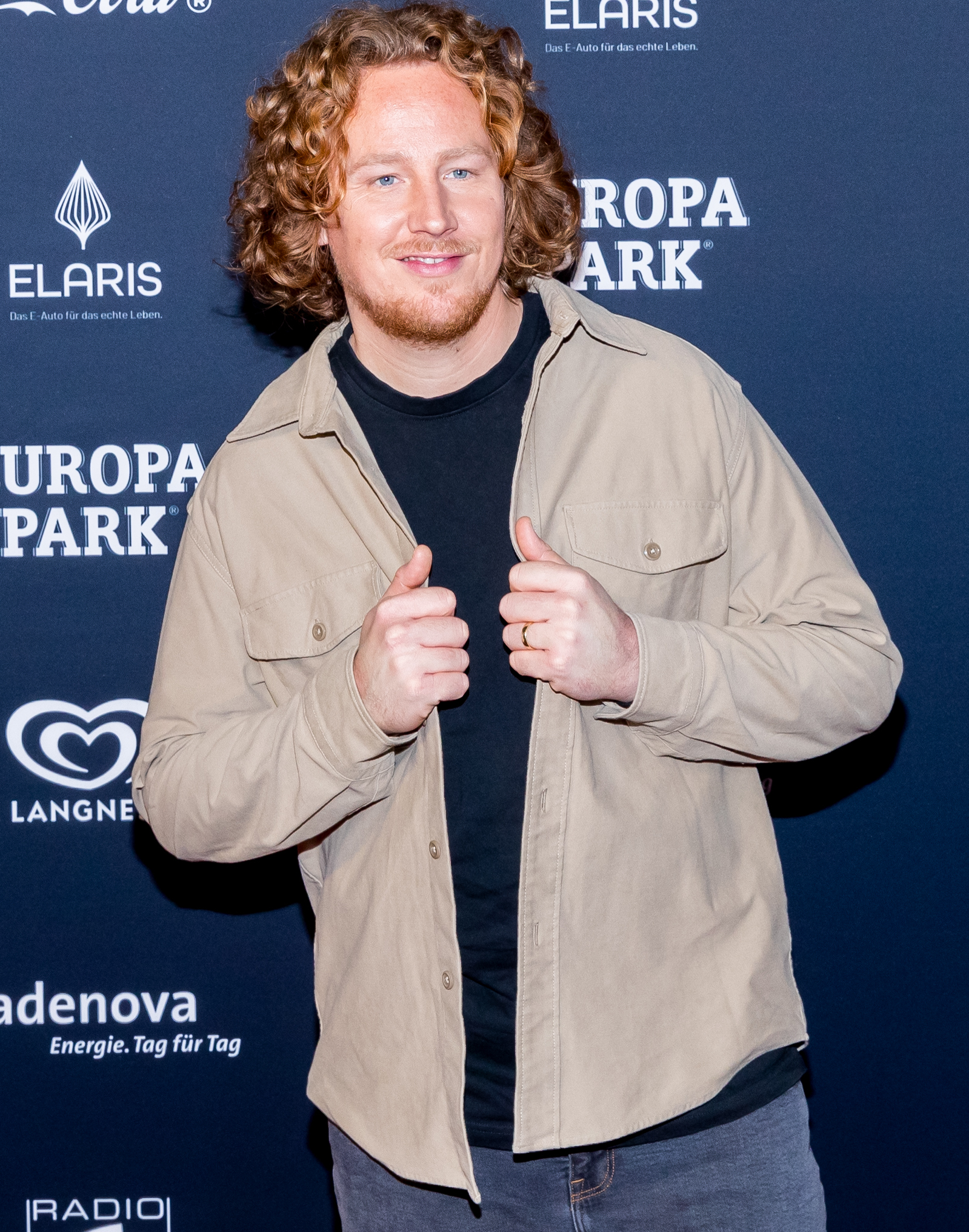
- Schulte in 2024

Background information
- Born: 30 April 1990 (age 36); Eckernförde, Schleswig-Holstein, West Germany
- Genres: Pop
- Occupations: Singer; songwriter
- Instrument: Vocals
- Years active: 2008–present
- Label: Polydor

Michael Anthony Schulte (German pronunciation: [ˈmɪçaʔeːl ˈʔɛntəniː ˈʃʊltə, - ˈʔɛnθə-]; born 30 April 1990) is a German singer and songwriter. He began his singing career in 2008, posting covers on his YouTube channel and later placed third on season one of The Voice of Germany in 2012. His debut studio album Wide Awake was released later that year. He represented Germany in the Eurovision Song Contest 2018 in Lisbon, Portugal, with the song "You Let Me Walk Alone". He finished in fourth place with 340 points and becomes the highest scoring for Germany.

== Early life ==
Schulte was born on 30 April 1990 in Eckernförde and grew up first in Lindau, a part of Boren at the Schlei and later in Dollerup, a small municipality near Flensburg. He attended Duborg-Skolen, a Danish school and graduated in 2009. Afterwards, he completed his civil service. His father died when he was only fourteen years old.

== Career ==
=== 2012–2017: The Voice of Germany ===
Schulte began his career in 2008 by publishing covers of popular songs on his YouTube channel. Through his YouTube channel, he was able to sign with a management company and eventually signed with Weinstein Media founded by Singer/Songwriter Andy Weinstein (civil name: Andreas Weinstein) in Berlin.

In 2011, Schulte became a contestant on season one of The Voice of Germany. He auditioned with the song "Set Fire to the Rain" by Adele and joined the team of Rea Garvey. Schulte progressed through the competition, eventually placing third behind winner Ivy Quainoo and runner-up Kim Sanders. Following the competition, he signed with German independent label Edel AG. His debut studio album Wide Awake was released in 2012.

=== 2017–present: Eurovision Song Contest and other projects ===
On 29 December 2017, Schulte was confirmed to be one of the six acts competing in Unser Lied für Lissabon, the German national selection for the Eurovision Song Contest 2018, with the song "You Let Me Walk Alone". The song was later released on 20 February 2018. Schulte won the final, held on 22 February, becoming Germany's entry to the 2018 Eurovision Song Contest. In Lisbon, Schulte received 340 points, ending up in fourth place. In 2020, Schulte provided German commentary for the Eurovision: Europe Shine a Light special event, broadcast on Das Erste, alongside Peter Urban. During the show, Michael also sang a duet version of "Ein bißchen Frieden" with Ilse DeLange set in the Peace Palace (Dutch: Vredespaleis) in The Hague. He later released a single with DeLange entitled "Wrong Direction".

== Discography ==
Studio albums

- All the Waves (2011)
- Berlin Sessions (2011)
- Wide Awake (2012)
- My Christmas Classics (2013)
- The Arising (2014)
- Hold the Rhythm (2017)
- Highs & Lows (2019)
- Remember Me (2023)
- Beautiful Reasons (2026)

Preceded by Levina with "Perfect Life"	Germany in the Eurovision Song Contest; 2018	Succeeded by S!sters with "Sister"
