= Levina (singer) =

German singer-songwriter

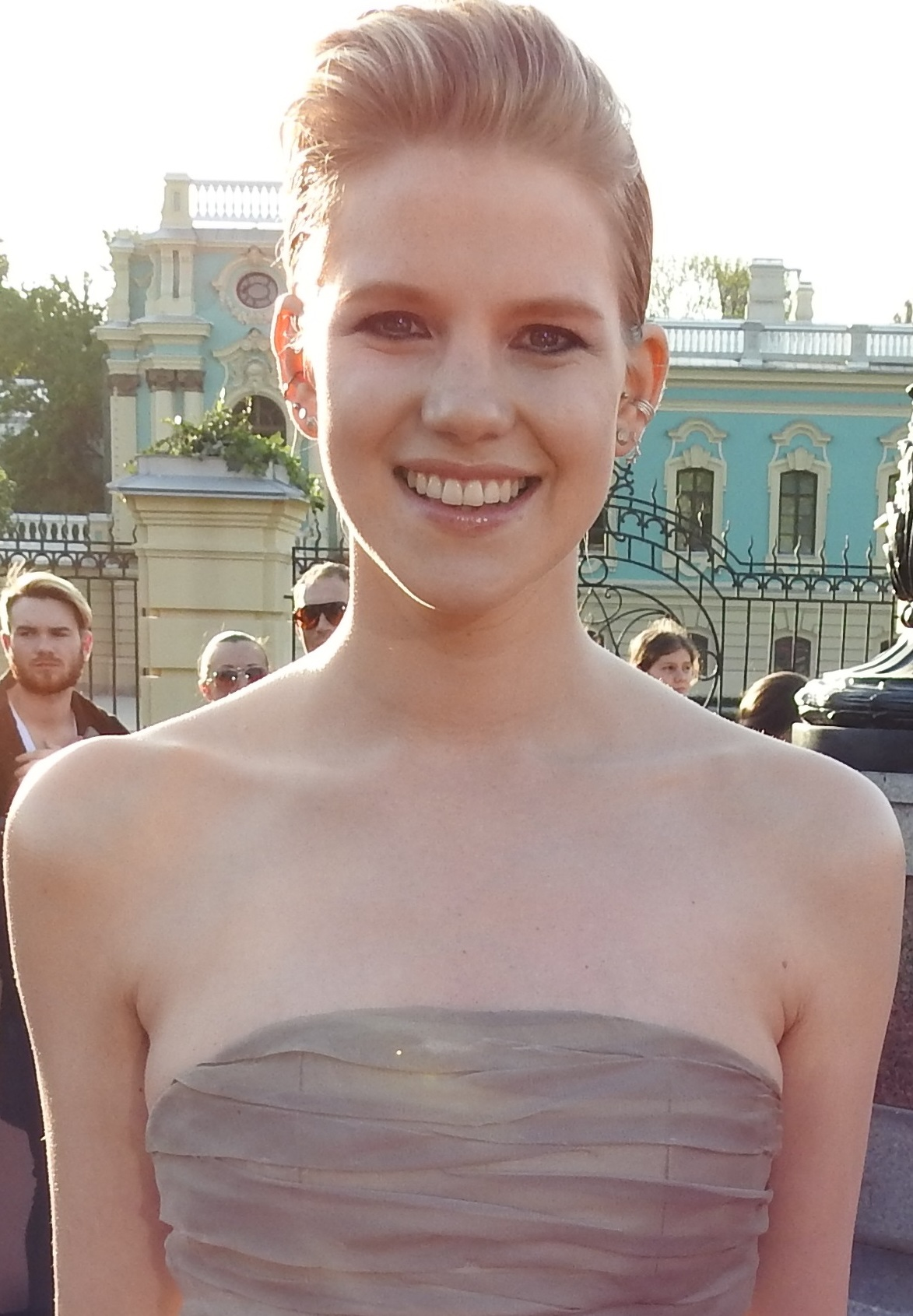
- Levina in May 2017

Background information
- Born: Isabella Levina Lueen; 1 May 1991 (age 35); Bonn, Germany
- Genre: Pop
- Occupations: Singer; songwriter
- Instrument: Vocals

Isabella Levina Lueen (born 1 May 1991), better known mononymously as Levina (German pronunciation: [lɛˈviːna]), is a German singer-songwriter. She represented Germany in the Eurovision Song Contest 2017 in Kyiv with the song "Perfect Life" and finished in 25th place with 6 points in the final.

== Life and career ==
Levina was born in Bonn as Isabella Lueen, and was raised in Chemnitz. She attended the Dr.-Wilhelm-André-Gymnasium, and graduated with an International Baccalaureate degree from the Impington Village College in Cambridge (UK) in 2009. She then moved to London where she earned her bachelor's degree from King's College London. She splits her time between Berlin and London, where she studies music management at the London College of Music.

=== Eurovision Song Contest 2017 ===
In 2016, Levina was announced as one of the 33 shortlisted acts for Unser Song 2017. On 6 January 2017, she was confirmed to be one of the five finalists. During the show, Levina performed a cover of "When We Were Young" by Adele for the cover round. She ended up advancing to the final as the sole artist left, performing the songs "Wildfire" and "Perfect Life". As the German public chose the latter as the winner, Levina performed "Perfect Life" at the Eurovision Song Contest 2017 in Kyiv. As Germany is a member of the "Big Five", she automatically advanced to the final, held on 13 May 2017.

== Discography ==
=== Studio albums ===
Title	Details
Unexpected	Released: 28 April 2017; Label: Unser Song Records; Format: Digital download, CD
Invincible Summer	Released: 4 September 2026; Label: Strange World Records; Format: Digital download, CD

=== Extended plays ===
Title	Details
Bedroom Records	Released: 3 November 2015; Label: Spinnup; Format: Digital download
Perfect Life	Released: 9 February 2017; Label: Unser Song Records; Format: Digital download

=== Singles ===
Title	Year	Peak positions	Album
Title	Year	GER	Album
"Divided"	2016	—	Divided
"Perfect Life"	2017	28	Unexpected
"Stop Right There"	2017	—	Unexpected
"Lows"	2020	—	Non-album single
"—" denotes a single that did not chart or was not released in that territory.

Preceded by Jamie-Lee Kriewitz with "Ghost"	Germany in the Eurovision Song Contest; 2017	Succeeded by Michael Schulte with "You Let Me Walk Alone"
