= Unexpected (Levina album) =

Studio album by Levina
- Released: 28 April 2017
- Length: 43:32
- Label: Unser Song
- Producer: Swen Meyer; Roland Spremberg

Levina chronology
Perfect Life (2017)	Unexpected (2017)

Singles from Unexpected
- 1. "Perfect Life" Released: 10 February 2017

Unexpected is the debut studio album by German recording artist Levina. It was released on 28 April 2017 by Unser Song Records in association with RCA Records and Sony Music.

== Promotion ==
"Perfect Life" was released as the lead single from the album on 10 February 2017. The song peaked at number 28 on the German Singles Chart. In January 2017, Levina was confirmed to be one of the five finalists competing in Unser Song 2017, Germany's national final for the Eurovision Song Contest 2017. On 9 February 2017, she advanced to the final round with the songs "Wildfire" and "Perfect Life". The German public then chose "Perfect Life" as the winning song. As Germany is a member of the "Big Five", she automatically advanced to the finals, held on 13 May 2017 in Kyiv, Ukraine.

== Critical reception ==
Professional ratings
Review scores
Source	Rating
laut.de	3/5 stars
Musicheadquarter.de	8/9

Musicheadquarter.de gave the album an 8/9 rating and called Unexpected a "fantastic debut." The website further noted: "The entire album shows that Levina is certainly not just a stopgap solution for this year's Eurovision Song Contest. Instead, we see and hear a charming and mature artist who moves calmly through the media landscape and steps confidently into the big shoes that come with this television event." Luca Wisnagrotzky from laut.de rated the album three out of five stars. He found that while "Levina can definitely sing, no question about it — she has a truly beautiful voice and masters every pitch with ease [...] that fragile seed is quickly trampled underfoot by the polished boot of slick, formulaic overproduction." Wisnagrotzky concluded however that "there are, in fact, some redeeming qualities" and cited opening track "The Current", "Echo", and "Stop Right There" among Unexpected's highlights.

== Track listing ==
Unexpected track listing
No.	Title	Writer(s)	Producer(s)	Length
1.	"The Current"	Isabella Levina Lueen; Roland Spremberg; Laila Samuels	Spremberg	4:33
2.	"Echo"	Tom Hugo Hermansen; Nicholas Ginbey; Rüdiger Schramm; Max Hussel; Mari Myrholt	Swen Meyer	3:24
3.	"Perfect Life" (ESC Version)	Lindsey Ray; Lindy Robbins; Dave Bassett	Spremberg	3:04
4.	"Nothing More Beautiful"	Alex Geringas; Mike Busbee; Katt Rockwell	Spremberg	3:29
5.	"Wildfire"	Marit Larsen; Greg Holden; Tofer Brown	Meyer	3:13
6.	"Ordinary People"	Andreas Öhrn; Stefan Örn; Christoffer Lauridsen; Silas Bjerregaard Lassen	Meyer	3:33
7.	"Love Me All the Time"	Ellie Wyatt; Hero Baldwin; Pete Loriano	Spremberg	3:12
8.	"Run on You"	Engelina Andrina Larsen; Chris Wahle; Sam Merrifield	Meyer	3:02
9.	"Stop Right There"	Lueen; Spremberg; Samuels	Spremberg	2:54
10.	"Courage to Say Goodbye"	Lueen; Spremberg; Samuels	Meyer	3:01
11.	"One in a Million"	Steffen Häfelinger; Roland Meyer	Spremberg	3:41
12.	"Nothing at All"	Lueen	Meyer	2:57
13.	"Perfect Life" (Madizin Mix)	Ray; Robbins; Bassett	Spremberg	3:22
Total length:				43:32

== Release history ==
Unexpected release history
Region	Date	Format	Label
Germany	28 April 2017	Digital download	Unser Song
