= Voxxclub =

German Boy Band

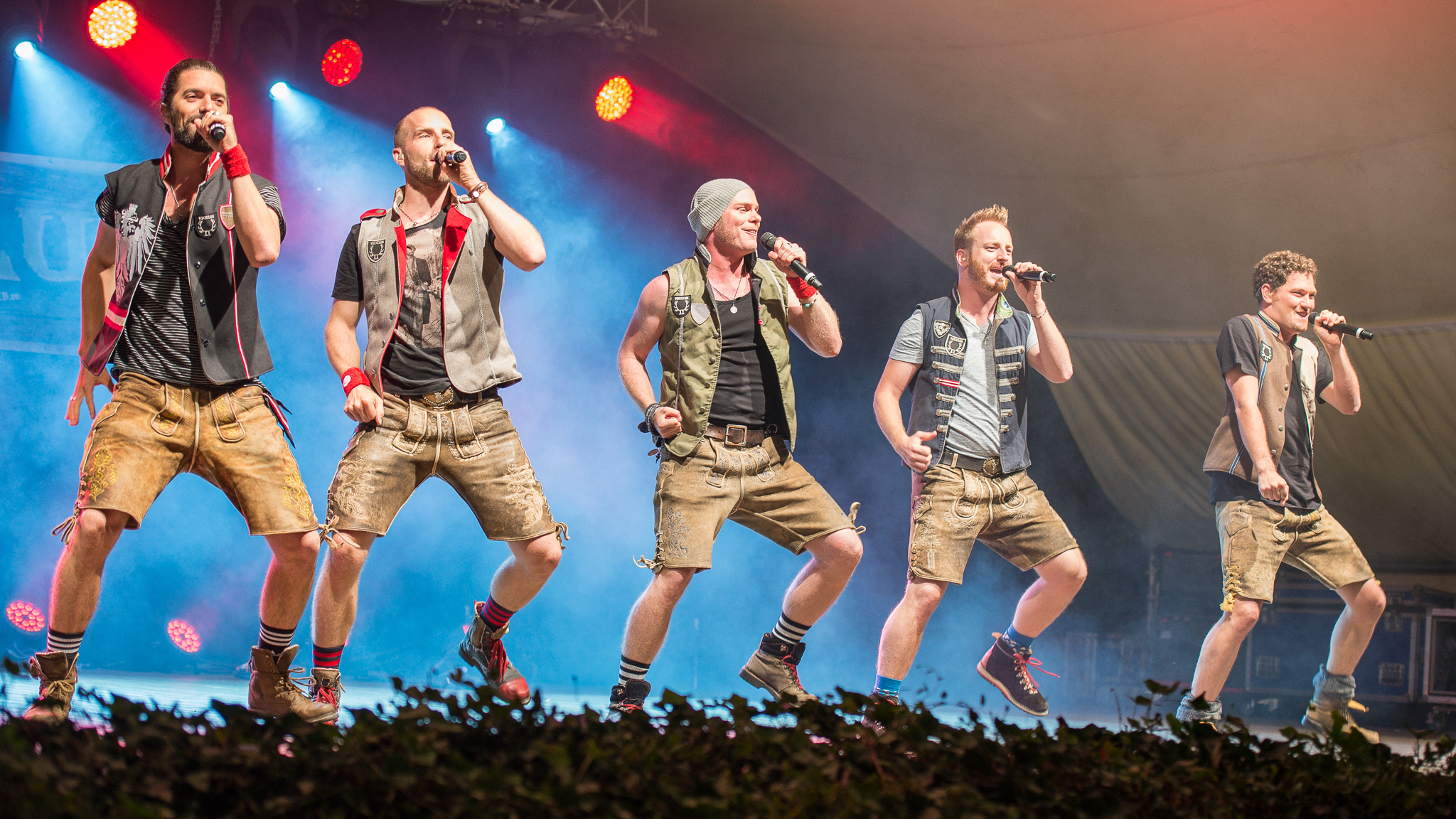
- Voxxclub performing in September 2016. From left to right: Michael Hartinger, Stefan Raaflaub, Korbinian Arendt, Christian Schild and Florian Claus

Background information
- Origin: Munich, Germany
- Genres: Folk; pop; Neue Volksmusik
- Years active: 2012–present
- Members: Florian Claus; Stefan Rafflaub; Korbinian Arendt; Christian Schild; Michael Hartinger
- Past members: Julian David
- Website: www.voxxclub.de

Voxxclub is a German Neue Volksmusik band. Their signature song is their cover of "Rock Mi".

== History ==
Stefan Raaflaub, Korbinian Arendt, and Florian Claus met in 2010, when they performed in the Broadway musical Singin' in the Rain.

The group was founded in Munich in 2012 by Martin Simma, who then also took over the management, along with students Michael Hartinger, Korbinian Arendt, Christian Schild, Florian Claus, Stefan Raaflaub and Julian David. The band members come from Germany, Austria, and Switzerland.

The group became known through two music videos, which they staged as if they were flash mobs, in which the band performed with a newly produced version of the song "Rock mi" (originally by the Austrian band AlpenRebellen). The first flash mob, which included Voxxclub plus 50 other performers in a shopping mall in Munich, was motivated in part by the lack of financing for a professionally produced music video.

Their debut album, Alpin, was released in March 2013 and reached the top 30 in Germany and Austria, which it held for several weeks. In Switzerland, it reached the top 50 for two weeks. The single "Rock mi" peaked at number 44 in both Germany and Austria and stayed on the German chart for 10 weeks, and on the Austrian chart for seven weeks. For Oktoberfest, the album was re-released with five additional songs and re-entered the charts, as did their single. The title "Rock mi" became in the interpretation of Voxxclub a popular song at the Oktoberfest.

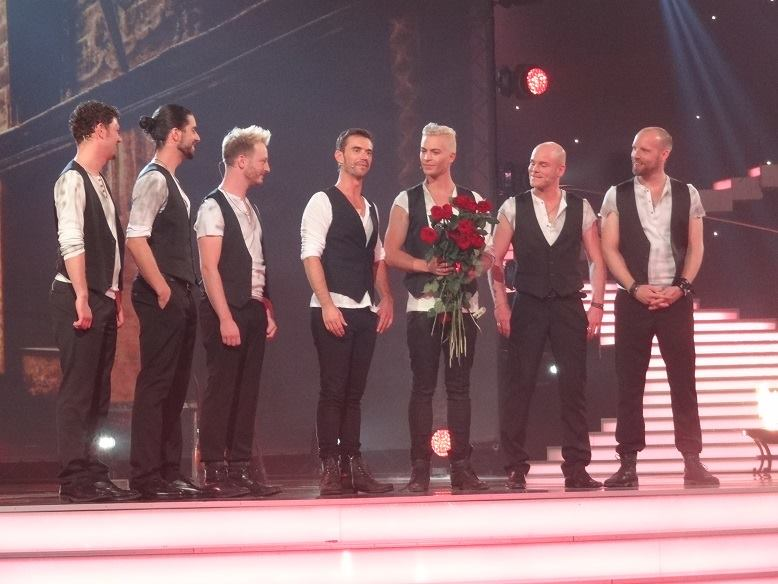
Voxxclub with Florian Silbereisen at their last performance with Julian David on Die Besten im Sommer in 2015. The band toured four times with Silbereisen.

In 2014, Voxxclub was nominated for an Echo Music Prize in the Folk Music category. In the same year, the group released in Hamburg with Roland Spremberg the album Ziwui. The title of the album goes back to the Tyrolean folk song "Ziwui" ("The song of the bird catcher", also called "Höttinger bird catcher song"), but is, except for the name, a completely new composition.

In 2014, Voxxclub went on a solo tour in Germany, Austria, and Switzerland and in the same year did the "Festival of festivals" tour. On May 4, 2015, members announced on their Facebook page that Julian David was leaving the band. In 2015, Voxxclub were again guests on the tour "Festival of Festivals – The party continues". In 2015 Voxxclub's album Ziwui was nominated for an Echo in the category "Folk Music".

Voxxclub released their third album, Geiles Himmelblau (Cool Blue-sky), in February 2016. They embarked on a solo tour in Germany, Austria and Switzerland, and released the resulting DVD Geiles Himmelblau: Live.

In 2017 Voxxclub was nominated for the third time for the Echo in the category "Folk Music". From March to May 2017, Voxxclub was a guest on the tour "Das große Schlagerfest" in Germany and Austria.

On 22 February 2018, the band took part in Our Song for Lisbon, the German preliminary vote for the Eurovision Song Contest 2018.

== Style ==
The band's style, Neue Volksmusik, combines traditional German folk music with a modern style. The musicians all had a personal connection to Alpine styles, and they wanted to dispel the myth that Alpine musical traditions were only suitable for previous generations.

The band's image has been criticized as being predetermined by the music industry; this was reinforced by the group's appearances in Lederhosen, their seemingly alpine style of music.

== Discography ==
Albums

- Alpin (2013)
- Ziwui (2014)
- Geiles Himmelblau (2016)
- Donnawedda (2017)
- Wieder dahoam (2020)
- Rock mi – Die größten Hits (2020)

Singles

- "Rock mi" (2013) (im Original von den AlpenRebellen, 1996)
- "Woll Ma Tanzn Gehn" (2013)
- "Juchee auf der hohen Alm" (2013) (Originally by Münchner Zwietracht, 1991)
- "Wild's Wasser" (2013) (Originally by Seern, 1999)
- "Ewige Liebe" (2013) (Originally by Mash, 2000)
- "Rock mi (Après Ski Party Mix)" (2013)
- "Ziwui Ziwui" (2014)
- "Donnawedda" (2017)
- "I mog Di so" (2018)
- "Anneliese" (2019)
- "Was geht hier ab" (2022)

== Awards ==
As of 2023, the band has been nominated four times for Echo.

- smago! Award
- 2013: Shooting star of the year
- 2016: for the most successful group Volxpop
- Die Eins der Besten
  - 2014 und 2015
- Mein Star des Jahres
  - 2014: Best Folk Music Star
