= Ryk =

German singer (born 1989)

- Birth name: Rick Jurthe
- Born: 30 November 1989 (age 35); Gehrden, West Germany
- Genres: Alternative rock; indie pop
- Occupations: Singer; songwriter; record producer

Rick Jurthe (born 30 November 1989), known mononymously as Ryk, is a German singer, songwriter and music producer.

== Early life ==
Rick Jurthe was born in Gehrden, Lower Saxony. At the age of 5, Jurthe received their first piano lessons. Until they were 17, they studied classical training in the Russian school with pianist Vera Spindel, who came from Saint Petersburg. After graduating from Gymnasium in Bad Nenndorf, Jurthe studied composition and music production at the Hanover University of Music, Drama and Media, the Goldsmiths University of London and the Royal College of Music in Stockholm. Since then they have worked as a songwriter, composer and music producer for various projects and artists in a wide variety of genres, including: the Cirque du Soleil and the Vienna Symphony.

== Career ==
Jurthe is involved in numerous voluntary projects to promote youth pop culture. In spring 2014 they were awarded the German Student Union Prize for their commitment. In spring 2017, their film music for the short film Samira with Lucas Prisor was nominated for the award for best film music at the Aubagne International Film Festival. Shortly afterwards, Jurthe was hired as composer and musical director of Feuerwerk der Gymnastics, Europe's largest and most successful circus and variety show with 250,000 spectators annually.

On 22 February 2018, Jurthe took part as Ryk in the television show Unser Lied für Lissabon, the German preliminary round for the Eurovision Song Contest 2018. In autumn 2019, Jurthe appeared as a guest singer alongside Conchita Wurst at a crossover concert with the Vienna Symphony in the Stadthalle Vienna.

Jurthe was cast as the lead male vocal role in Cirque du Soleil's residency show NYSA at the Potsdamer Platz Theatre in Berlin, planned for 2020. The show had been postponed indefinitely due to the COVID-19 pandemic. For the 2020 Summer Olympics in Tokyo, which were postponed to 2021, Jurthe designed the musical concept of the FIG Gala in collaboration with the Lower Saxony Gymnastics Association and the International Gymnastics Federation.

For the 75th anniversary of the German state of Lower Saxony, Jurthe composed a symphonic work for the Lower Saxony Youth Symphony Orchestra, which was premiered at a ceremony on 1 November 2021 in the Hanover Kuppelsaal. Since February 2023, Jurthe has been working as creative director of the gymnastics and acrobatics show Feuerwerk der Turnkunst. Jurthe took part in the German preliminary round for the Eurovision Song Contest 2024 with the song "Oh Boy", ultimately coming third.

== Discography ==
=== EPs ===
- 2014: Fables (Welthund Music)
- 2015: Polar (Roof Music)
- 2021: Parasite Future (Welthund Music)

=== Singles ===
- 2013: "Run" (Welthund Music)
- 2016: "Un-Unify" (Embassy of Music)
- 2018: "You and I" (Welthund Music)
- 2024: "Oh Boy" (Welthund Music)
