= LaBrassBanda =

German brass band

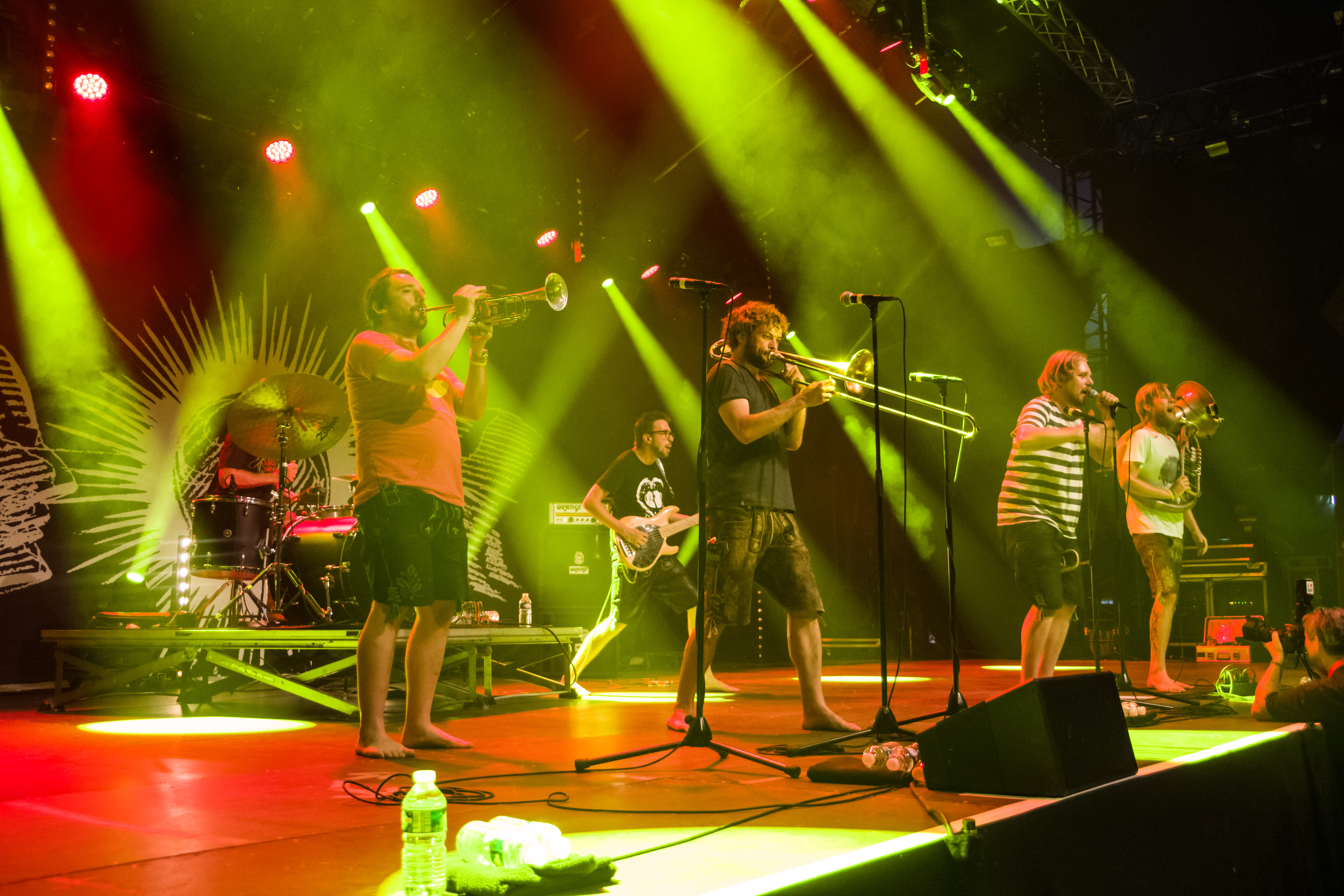
- LaBrassBanda in 2017

Background information
- Origin: Übersee, Bavaria, Germany
- Genres: Neue Volksmusik; Bavarian folk; wind band; punk; Gypsy punk; reggae; brass
- Years active: 2007–present
- Members: Stefan Dettl; Andreas Hofmeir; Manuel Winbeck; Manuel da Coll; Mario Schönhofer; Jörg Hartl; Korbinian Weber; Tobias Weber; Stefan Huber; Michael Wagner
- Past members: Oliver Wrage; Julian Buschberger
- Website: labrassbanda.com

LaBrassBanda is a Bavarian brass band originating from Übersee, near Chiemsee, Bavaria, Germany. The name of the band is a portmanteau of the Italian words "la banda" and the English term "brass band", both meaning the same.

== History of the band ==
The band was founded 2007 by Stefan Dettl, Andreas Hofmeir, Manuel Winbeck, Oliver Wrage, and Manuel da Coll. The five musicians got to know each other during their music studies. Stefan Dettl was inspired by the Youngblood Brass Band which he met at his New York City trip. Dettl was inspired by their combination of Brass music and Hip-Hop and R&B vibes.

The first concert of LaBrassBanda was in London. During UEFA Euro 2008 the band played concerts on their trailer at different fan miles, with their biggest gig being held at the final in Vienna. They also played at the 'Bavaria Open' in Munich. In 2009 the band was invited by the Goethe-Institut to take part in the German Culture Festival sibSTANCIJA_09 in Nowosibirsk and Akademgorodok, with more concerts after in Omsk, Krasnoyarsk and Moscow. In the same year LaBrassBanda appeared at the Harare International Festival of Arts in Zimbabwe, organized by the German Embassy and the Zimbabwe German Society, and at the Roskilde Festival.

During 2010 and 2012 they had 500 more concerts and festivals. They played at Hurricane Festival and Southside Festival. They also played gigs in Russia, Bosnia and Denmark. The band's aim is to make Volksmusik suitable for clubs.

In 2013 they participated in the national pre-selection of the Eurovision Song Contest. While they didn't win, their participation helped them become popular. In summer 2013, they opened for Die Ärzte on a few concerts.

The music genre of LaBrassBanda is "Neue Volksmusik", but the music style is a combination of Brass, reggae, Punk, Gipsy, Jazz and techno with a typical Bavarian note. Stefan Dettl and Manuel Winbeck sing in Bavarian, so not everybody can understand the lyrics. The band's lyrics generally focus on beer, girls and parties.

The band is known for their unusual attire: All members play at concerts barefoot, in Lederhosen and T-shirts.

In 2013 Oliver Wrage left the band due to personal issues, and in 2014, Andreas Hofmeir left the band, with Stefan Huber taking his place. Today, he has got many solo projects and is a professor at the 'Mozarteum' in Salzburg. Stefan Dettl had two solo albums: 2011 Rockstar and 2012 Summer of Love. On these albums he does not play trumpet but the guitar. In 2013 Mario Schönhofer (Bass), Jörg Hartl (Trumpet), Korbinian Weber (Trumpet), Tobias Weber (Percussion) joined the band.

== Discography ==
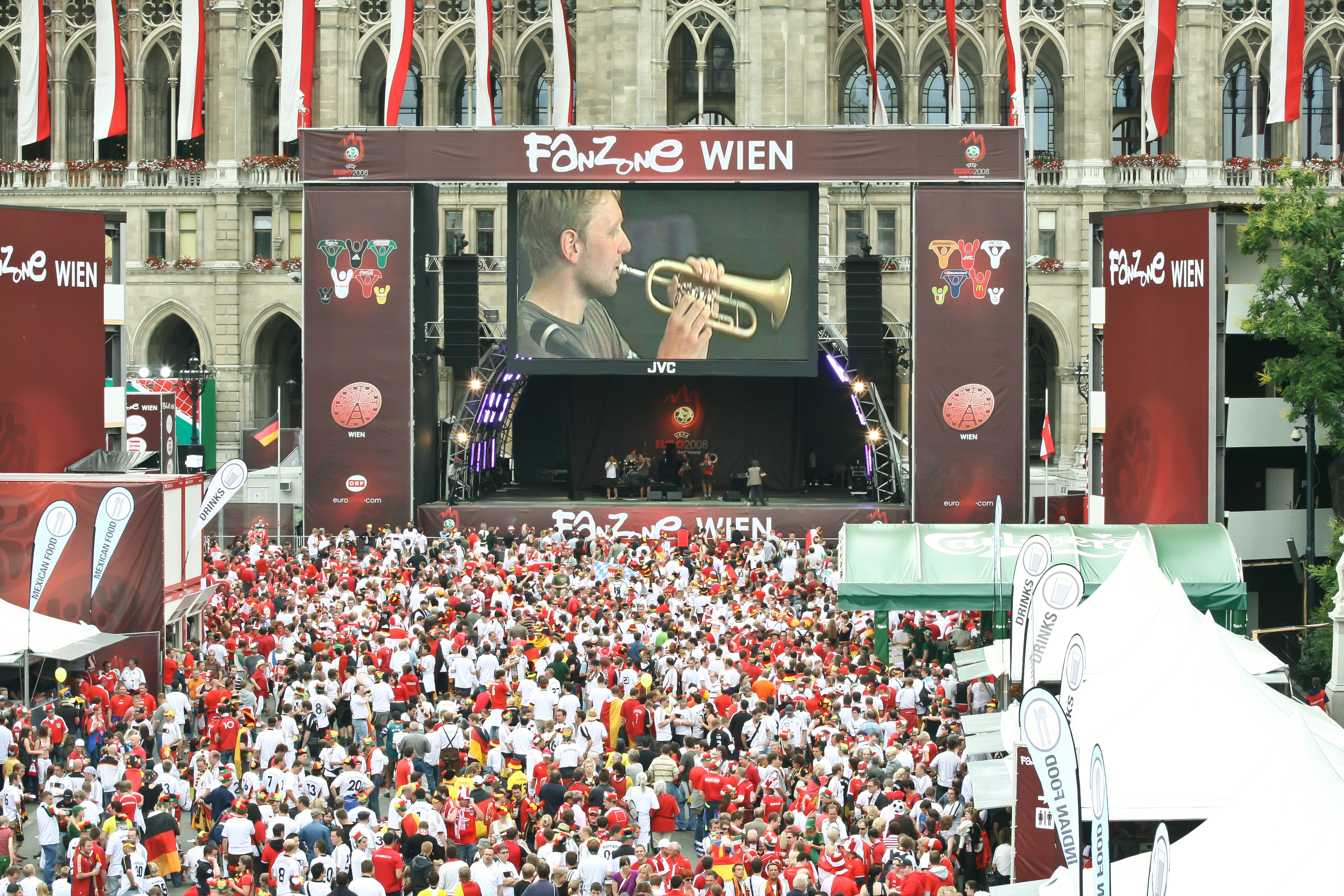
LaBrassBanda in Vienna (2008)

=== Albums ===
Year	Title	Number of Songs	Chart positions		Awards (noble metals)
Year	Title	Number of Songs	GER	AUT	Awards (noble metals)
2008	Habediehre	11	85	–	–
2009	Übersee	13	39	–	–
2012	Live Olympiahalle München	16	15	58	–
2013	Europa	14	3	10	–
2014	Kiah Royal	16	4	21	–
2015	Europa – in Dub	10	–	–	–
2017	Around the World	11	10	13	–
2020	Danzn	12	3	-	–

=== Contributions to collective works ===
- Habediehre on Songlines top of the world. Songlines Magazine: Issue 57, January/February 2009
- Music of Doctor Döblingers geschmackvolles Kasperltheater. A Bavarian marionette show for children. "Kasperl und das Kugeleis" – 2010

== Filmography ==
- 2009: LaBrassBanda – Habe di Ehre Übersee – Documentary by Marcus H. Rosenmüller
- 2010: LaBrassBanda – aus dem Circus Krone – Concert film by Marcus H. Rosenmüller
- 2010: The Hairdresser – Movie by Doris Dörrie, sound track by LaBrassBanda
- 2014: LaBrassBanda – (Dokumentarfilm von David Spaeth)
- 2014: LaBrassBanda – Kiah Royal – Concert film by Philip Lenner
- 2014: Winterkartoffelknödel – Movie by Ed Herzog, sound track by LaBrassBanda

== Literature ==
- Lorenz Beyer: LaBrassBanda: Bayern-Brass-Pop. In: Transkulturelle Musikprozesse in Oberbayern. Fallstudien zu hybrider Musik und territorialer Codierung im gesellschaftlichen Kontext. (German) Dissertation at University of Music and performing Arts Vienna, 2017. pp. 143–204 (PDF; 30 MB)
