= Julian David =

German Schlager singer

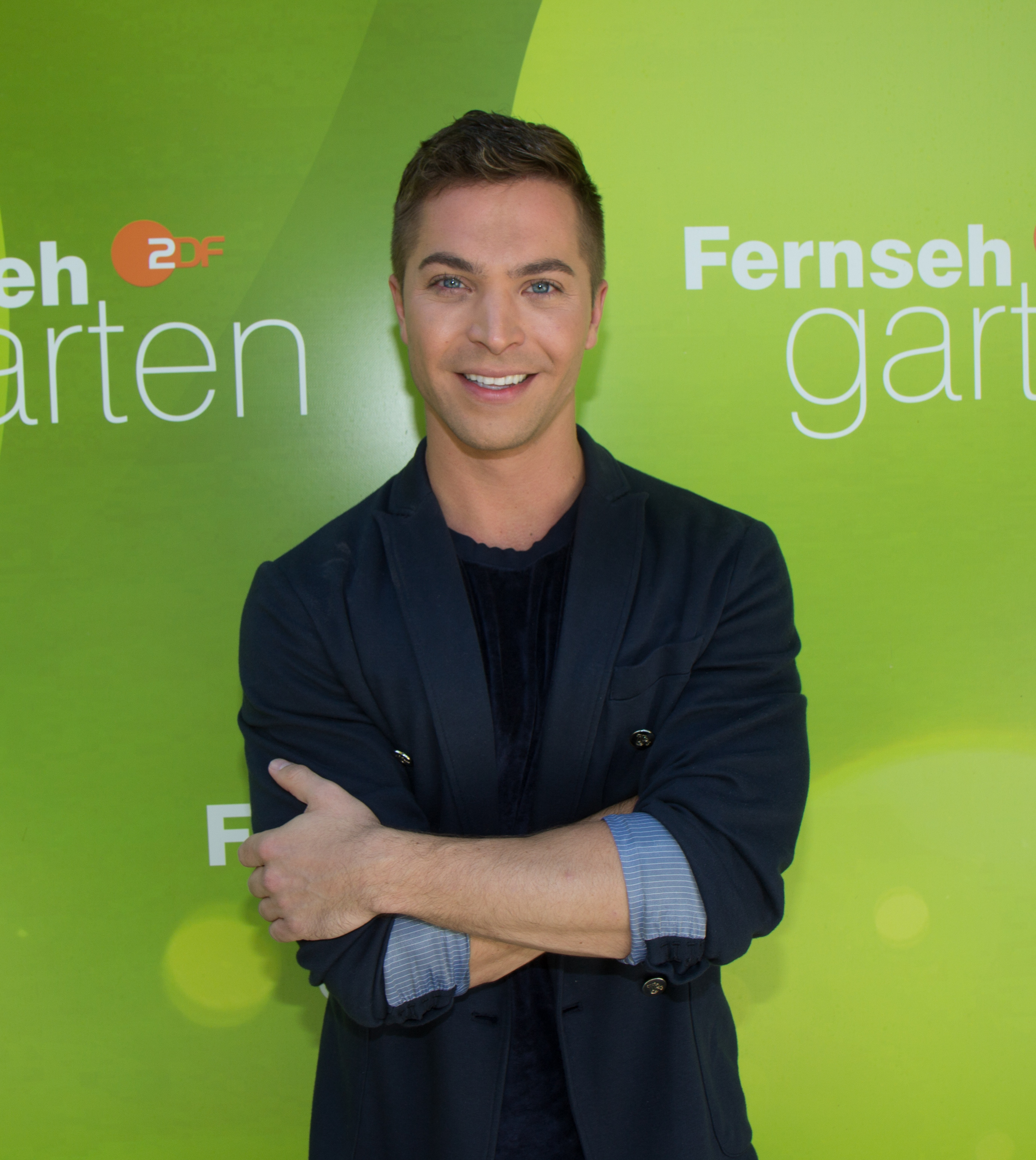
- David in 2018.
- Born: 23 December 1989 (age 35); Mannheim, Germany
- Occupations: Singer; actor; entertainer
- Years active: 2012–present
- Musical career
- Formerly of: Voxxclub
- Website: Official website

Julian David (born 23 December 1989 in Mannheim, Germany) is a German Schlager singer, actor and entertainer, who focuses in the pop song genre.

== Career ==
After graduating from secondary school, David attended the Bayerische Theaterakademie August Everding in Munich. He graduated in 2010 with "very good" as a musical dancer. David appeared at the Pfalztheater in Kaiserslautern in the musical The King and I, performed at the Bonn Opera in the musical Hair, in the musical Grease as "Danny Zuko" and as "Radames" in Elton John's Musical Aida.

David gained greater fame through his appearance in the cover band Voxxclub. by 2015, following their separation he received a recording contract with Electrola and produced Am Ende des Tages (at the end of the day) as his first single. The production of the debut album was taken over by Felix Gauder, songwriter Olaf Bossi worked five other songs with OLI Nova. addicted to friends was released on October 9, 2015

Also in 2015, David was hired for the role of the "youngling" for the movie Under ConTroll.

In September 2015, David hosted his first TV show, for Sat.1 Gold .

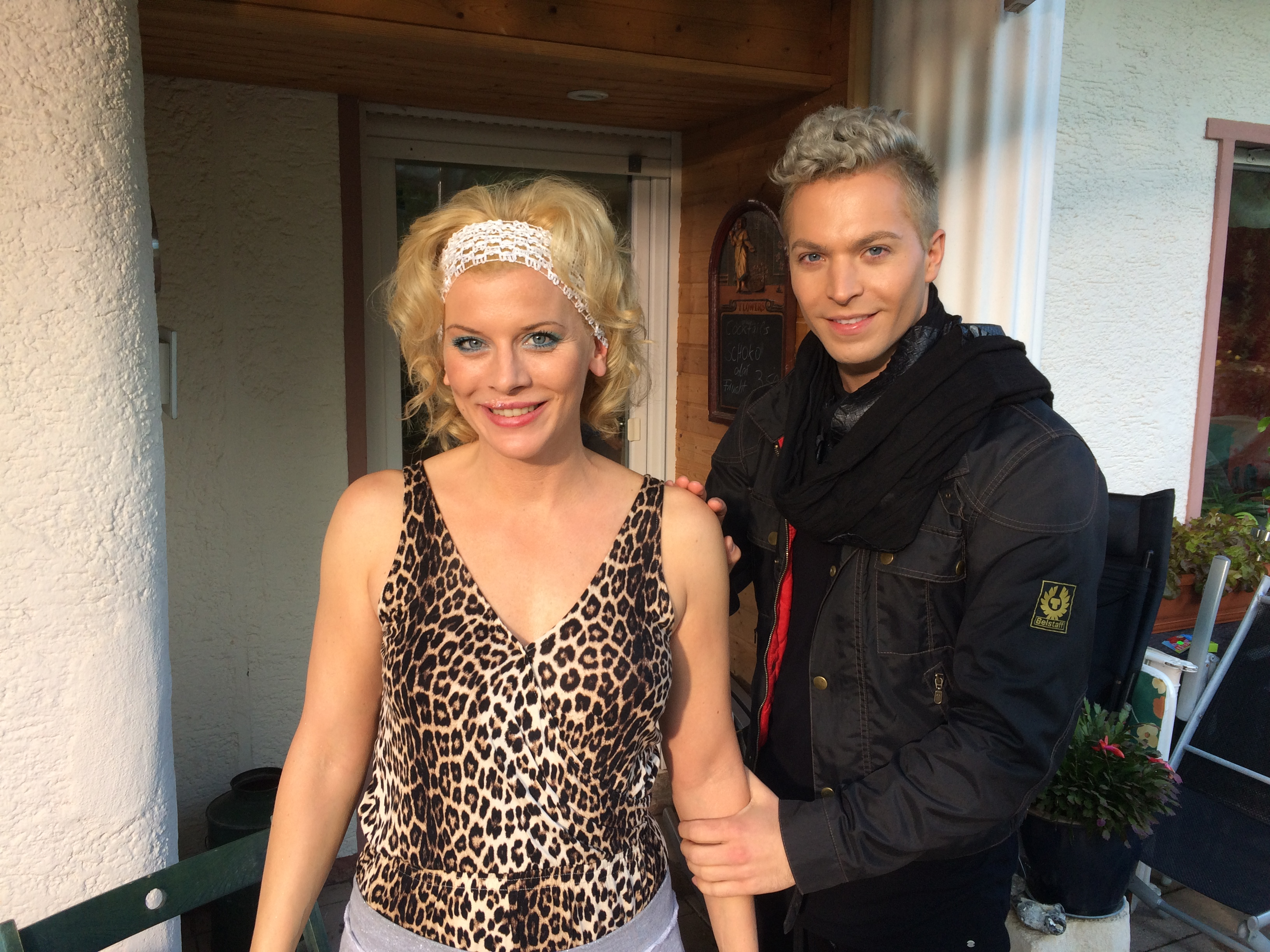
Julian David and Eva Habermann during the filming of Under ConTroll (2015)

Since 2017, David has hosted his own radio show on schlagersender Schlagerplanet Radio. He also presents a weekly YouTube show, "Die Schlagerköche," in which cooks with other Schlagerstars.

In December 2017, David took part in the project 'Schlagerstars für Kinder' and sang the Christmas hit "Auf Einmal" with the group. The hit was released in December and the proceeds went to children in need.

== Discography ==
=== Albums ===
- 2015: Süchtig nach dir
- 2019: ohne limit

=== Singles ===
- 2015: "Am Ende des Tages"
- 2015: "Hollywood"
- 2015: "Verboten gut"
- 2015: "Kerzenlicht und Mistelzweig"
- 2017: "Spektakulär"
- 2017: "Mein Kompass zu dir"
- 2017: "Wir sind nie allein"
- 2018: "Mondlicht"
