= Germany in the Eurovision Song Contest 2017 =

- Eurovision Song Contest 2017
- Participating broadcaster: ARD (Note: Arbeitsgemeinschaft der öffentlich-rechtlichen Rundfunkanstalten der Bundesrepublik Deutschland) – Norddeutscher Rundfunk (NDR)
- Country: Germany
- Selection process: Unser Song 2017
- Selection date: 9 February 2017

Competing entry
- Song: "Perfect Life"
- Artist: Levina
- Songwriters: Lindsey Ray; Lindy Robbins; Dave Bassett

Placement
- Final result: 25th, 6 points

Participation chronology

Germany was represented at the Eurovision Song Contest 2017 with the song "Perfect Life" written by Lindsey Ray, Lindy Robbins and Dave Bassett, and performed by Levina. The German entry for the 2017 contest in Kyiv, Ukraine was selected through the national final Unser Song 2017, organised by the German broadcaster ARD in collaboration with Norddeutscher Rundfunk (NDR). The national final took place on 9 February 2017 with the winner being selected through four rounds of public televoting. "Perfect Life" performed by Levina was selected as the German entry for Kyiv after gaining 69% of the votes in the fourth round.

As a member of the "Big Five", Germany automatically qualified to compete in the final of the Eurovision Song Contest. Performing in position 21, Germany placed twenty-fifth out of the 26 participating countries with 6 points.

== Background ==
Prior to the 2017 contest, Germany had participated in the Eurovision Song Contest sixty times since its debut as one of seven countries to take part in 1956. Germany has won the contest on two occasions: in 1982 with the song "Ein bißchen Frieden" performed by Nicole and in 2010 with the song "Satellite" performed by Lena. Germany, to this point, has been noted for having competed in the contest more than any other country; they have competed in every contest since the first edition in 1956 except for the 1996 contest when the nation was eliminated in a pre-contest elimination round. In 2016, the German entry "Ghost" performed by Jamie-Lee placed last out of twenty-six competing songs scoring 11 points.

The German national broadcaster, ARD, broadcasts the event within Germany and delegates the selection of the nation's entry to the regional broadcaster Norddeutscher Rundfunk (NDR). NDR confirmed that Germany would participate in the 2017 Eurovision Song Contest on 23 May 2016. Since 2013, NDR had set up national finals with several artists to choose both the song and performer to compete at Eurovision for Germany. On 14 September 2016, the broadcaster announced that they would organise a multi-artist national final to select the German entry in the format of a talent show similar to 2010 and 2012, which resulted in a first place and a top ten result respectively at Eurovision for Germany.

== Before Eurovision ==
=== Unser Song 2017 ===
Unser Song 2017 (English: Our Song 2017) was the competition that selected Germany's entry for the Eurovision Song Contest 2017. The competition took place on 9 February 2017 at the Köln-Mülheim Studios in Cologne, hosted by Barbara Schöneberger. Like in the previous seven years, the national final was co-produced by the production company Brainpool, which also co-produced the Eurovision Song Contest 2011 in Düsseldorf and the Eurovision Song Contest 2012 in Baku. Five artists and two songs competed during the show with the winner being selected through a public televote. The show was broadcast on Das Erste, One and Deutsche Welle as well as online via the broadcaster's Eurovision Song Contest website eurovision.de. The national final was watched by 3.14 million viewers in Germany with a market share of 10.8%.

==== Competing entries ====
Interested performers were able to apply by either uploading a performance clip of an original or cover song via YouTube between 14 September 2016 and 18 November 2016, or by presenting themselves and performing in front of a live camera at casting shows held at the Köln-Mülheim Studios in Cologne on 5 November 2016 and at the Hamburg-Lokstedt Studios in Hamburg on 12 November 2016. By the end of the process, it was announced that 2,493 applications were received and 33 performers were shortlisted by a six-member panel consisting of Thomas Schreiber (ARD entertainment coordinator, head of the fiction and entertainment department for NDR), Carola Conze (NDR representative, head of German delegation for Eurovision), Aditya Sharma (Radio Fritz lead music editor), Wolfgang Dalheimer (musical director), Jörg Grabosch (Brainpool managing director) and Claudia Gliedt (Raab TV head of music). Nathan Trent was automatically eliminated from the shortlist after he was announced as the 2017 Austrian Eurovision entrant on 19 December 2016. The five competing artists, selected by the six-member panel following a final casting round held at the Köln-Mülheim Studios in Cologne on 4 December 2016, were announced on 6 January 2017. On 17 January 2017, it was announced that Sadi had withdrawn from the competition and was replaced by Yosefin Buohler.

German and international composers and lyricists were directly called upon by NDR to submit their entries for the competition as candidate Eurovision songs. NDR specified that songs should be in the genre of "organic and authentic pop with English lyrics", "alternative mainstream", "singer-songwriter pop" or "contemporary dance-pop". The six-member panel selected the top two songs, which were announced on 1 February 2017.

Shortlisted artists
- Alessandro Capasso
- Alex Scuderi
- Anja Mann
- Axel Feige
- Beccy
- COOPA
- Elvira Michieva
- Felicia Lu Kürbiß
- Florian Brückl
- Helene Nissen
- Jo Marie Dominiak
- Kai Schernbeck
- Leonie Krakowski
- Levina
- Luisa Skrabic
- Makeda
- Marvin Schloßhauer
- Mary-Anne Bröllochs
- Max-Antoine Meisters
- Meg Pfeiffer
- ~~Nathan Trent~~
- Nila
- Patrice Gerlach
- Paul Köninger
- Philipp Ostendorf
- ~~Sadi~~
- Susanna Okonowski
- Sihna Maagé
- Sina Rösener
- Sven Lüchtenborg
- Taylor Luc Jacobs
- Yosefin Buohler

Competing songs
Song	Songwriter(s)
"Perfect Life"	Lindsey Ray, Lindy Robbins, Dave Bassett
"Wildfire"	Tofer Brown, Marit Larsen, Greg Holden

==== Final ====
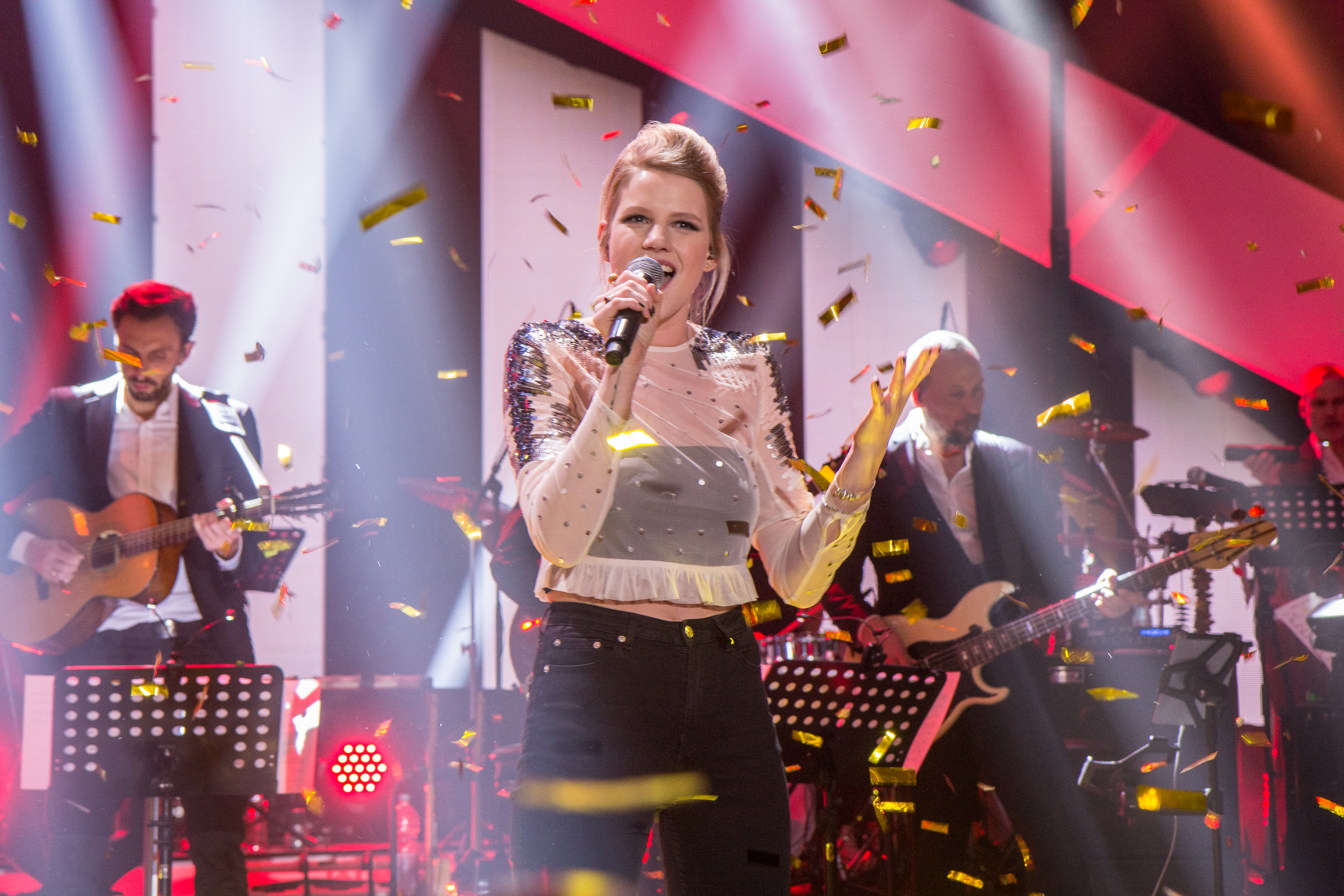
Levina performing at Unser Song 2017

The televised final took place on 9 February 2017. The winner was selected through four rounds of public televoting, including options for landline and SMS voting. International viewers were also able to vote via an app entitled Eurovision Vibes in the first three rounds but had no direct influence on the results. In the first round of voting, each artist performed a cover song and the top three artists were selected to proceed to the second round. In the second round, the three remaining artists performed one of the two candidate Eurovision songs, "Wildfire", and the top two artists were selected to proceed to the third round. In the second round, the two remaining artists performed the second candidate Eurovision song, "Perfect Life", and the top two combinations of artist and song were selected to proceed to the final round. In the final round, the winner, "Perfect Life" performed by Levina, was selected. 204,249 votes were cast in the first round, 168,909 votes were cast in the second round, 278,697 votes were cast in the third round and 145,692 votes were cast in the final round. The international app voting in the first two rounds were won by Axel Feige, while the third round resulted in a tie between Feige and Levina.

Three music experts provided feedback in regards to the performances during the show. The experts were 2010 German Eurovision Song Contest winner Lena, singer-songwriter Tim Bendzko, and singer and television presenter Florian Silbereisen. In addition to the performances of the competing entries, former winners of the Eurovision Song Contest Nicole (1982), Ruslana (2004) and Conchita Wurst (2014) performed a medley of Eurovision winning songs, German singer Matthias Schweighöfer performed his new song "Supermann und seine Frau", and Tim Bendzko performed his song "Immer noch Mensch".

First Round – 9 February 2017
R/O	Artist	Song (Original artists)	Televote	Place
1	Helene Nissen	"Folsom Prison Blues" (Johnny Cash)	49,964	2
2	Yosefin Buohler	"Love On Top" (Beyoncé)	12,748	5
3	Felicia Lu Kürbiß	"Dancing On My Own" (Robyn)	13,139	4
4	Axel Feige	"You Know My Name" (Chris Cornell)	39,242	3
5	Levina	"When We Were Young" (Adele)	89,156	1

Second Round – 9 February 2017
R/O	Artist	Song	Televote	Place
1	Helene Nissen	"Wildfire"	41,459	3
2	Axel Feige	"Wildfire"	47,639	2
3	Levina	"Wildfire"	79,811	1

Third Round – 9 February 2017
R/O	Artist	Song	Televote	Place	Result
1	Axel Feige	"Perfect Life"	57,631	3	—N/a
1	Axel Feige	"Wildfire"	36,266	4	—N/a
2	Levina	"Perfect Life"	60,474	2	Advanced
2	Levina	"Wildfire"	124,326	1	Advanced

Final Round – 9 February 2017
R/O	Artist	Song	Televote	Place
1	Levina	"Wildfire"	45,285	2
2	Levina	"Perfect Life"	100,407	1

=== Controversy ===
Several news sites and blogs had discussed a possible plagiarism of "Perfect Life" from the song "Titanium" by David Guetta. It was also claimed that the song was a plagiarism of the soundtrack for the 2014 German film Young and Wild, but the composition of the song predates the film, and hence could not have been plagiarised from the soundtrack A copyright claim against "Perfect Life" was subsequently launched by Sony Music, and a new version of the song was created and released on 17 March.

== At Eurovision ==
According to Eurovision rules, all nations with the exceptions of the host country and the "Big Five" (France, Germany, Italy, Spain and the United Kingdom) are required to compete in one of two semi-finals, and qualify in order to participate in the final; the top ten countries from each semi-final progress to the final. As a member of the "Big Five", Germany automatically qualified to compete in the final on 13 May 2017. In addition to their participation in the final, Germany is also required to broadcast and vote in one of the two semi-finals. This would have been regularly decided via a draw held during the semi-final allocation draw on 31 January 2017, however, prior to the draw, ARD requested of the European Broadcasting Union that Germany be allowed to broadcast and vote in the second semi-final on 11 May 2017, which was approved by the contest's Reference Group.

In Germany, the two semi-finals and the final were broadcast on One. ARD also broadcast the second semi-final on NDR Fernsehen and the final on Das Erste. All broadcasts featured commentary by Peter Urban. The final was watched by 7.85 million viewers in Germany, which meant a market share of 31.6 per cent. The German spokesperson, who announced the top 12-point score awarded by the German jury during the final, was Barbara Schöneberger.

=== Final ===
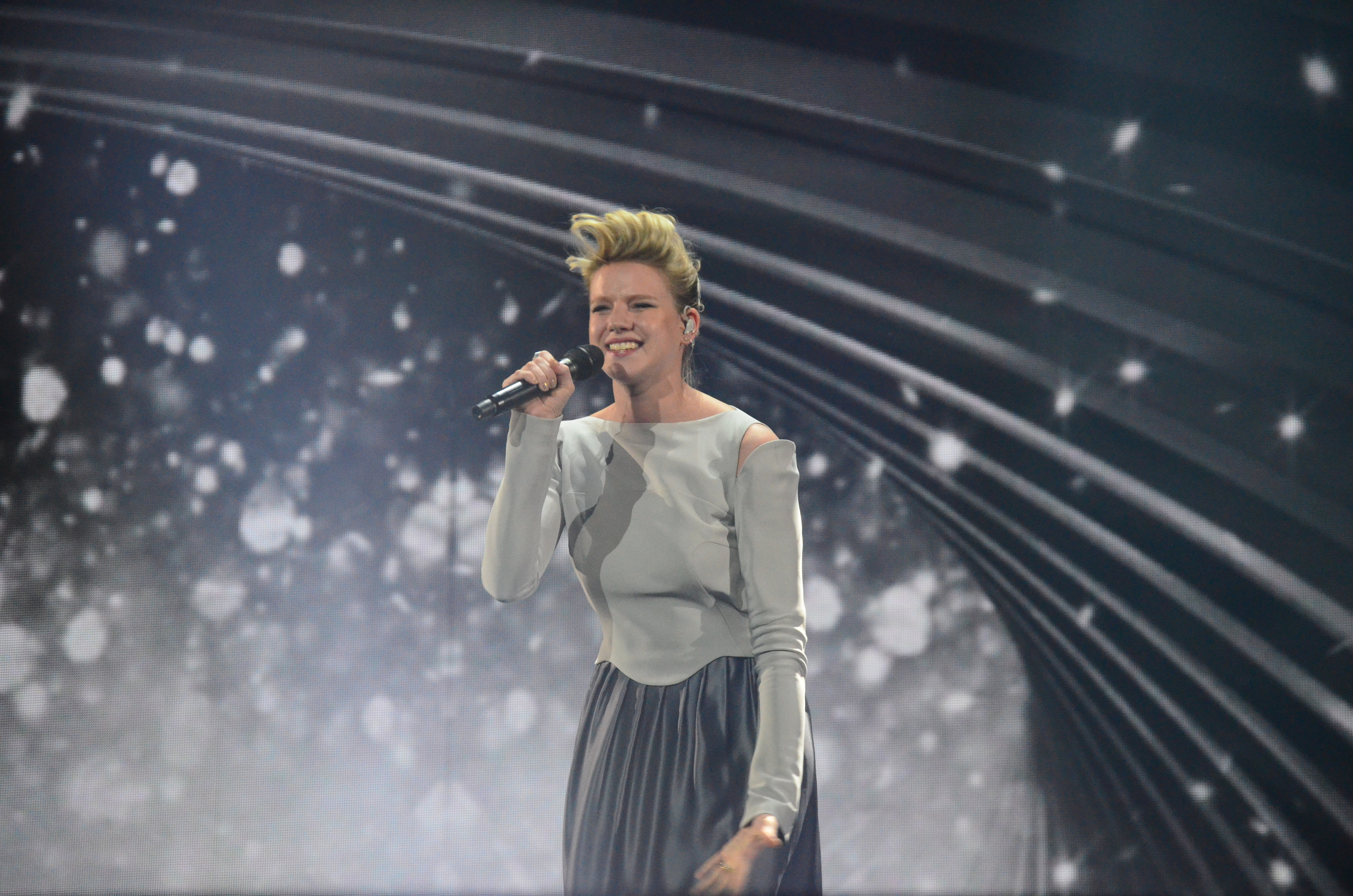
Levina during a rehearsal before the final

Levina took part in technical rehearsals on 5 and 7 May, followed by dress rehearsals on 10, 12 and 13 May. This included the semi-final jury show on 10 May where an extended clip of the German performance was filmed for broadcast during the live show on 11 May and the jury final on 12 May where the professional juries of each country watched and voted on the competing entries. After the technical rehearsals were held on 7 May, the "Big Five" countries and host nation Ukraine held a press conference. As part of this press conference, the artists took part in a draw to determine which half of the grand final they would subsequently participate in. Germany was drawn to compete in the second half. Following the conclusion of the second semi-final, the shows' producers decided upon the running order of the final. The running order for the semi-finals and final was decided by the shows' producers rather than through another draw, so that similar songs were not placed next to each other. Germany was subsequently placed to perform in position 21, following the entry from Romania and before the entry from Ukraine.

The German performance featured Levina performing on stage in a light grey top and a dark grey floor-length skirt. The staging presentation included Levina starting the performance on her back against the stage floor before standing up for the rest of the song. The LED screens displayed silver colours with black and white elements which began to multiply and rise upwards at the conclusion of the performance. Levina was joined by two off-stage backing vocalists: Esther Cowens and Louise Mills. Germany placed twenty-fifth in the final, scoring 6 points: 3 points from the televoting and 3 point from the juries.

=== Voting ===
Voting during the three shows involved each country awarding two sets of points from 1-8, 10 and 12: one from their professional jury and the other from televoting. Each nation's jury consisted of five music industry professionals who are citizens of the country they represent, with their names published before the contest to ensure transparency. This jury judged each entry based on: vocal capacity; the stage performance; the song's composition and originality; and the overall impression by the act. In addition, no member of a national jury was permitted to be related in any way to any of the competing acts in such a way that they cannot vote impartially and independently. The individual rankings of each jury member as well as the nation's televoting results were released shortly after the grand final.

Below is a breakdown of points awarded to Germany and awarded by Germany in the second semi-final and grand final of the contest, and the breakdown of the jury voting and televoting conducted during the two shows:

==== Points awarded to Germany ====
In the final, Germany received three points in the televote from Switzerland and 3 points in the jury vote from Ireland.

==== Points awarded by Germany ====
Points awarded by Germany (Semi-final 2)
Score	Televote	Jury
12 points	Bulgaria	Norway
10 points	Hungary	Bulgaria
8 points	Israel	Netherlands
7 points	Romania	Serbia
6 points	Croatia	Austria
5 points	Netherlands	Croatia
4 points	Austria	Ireland
3 points	Estonia	Malta
2 points	Norway	Switzerland
1 point	San Marino	Denmark

Points awarded by Germany (Final)
Score	Televote	Jury
12 points	Portugal	Norway
10 points	Belgium	Portugal
8 points	Croatia	Bulgaria
7 points	Moldova	Netherlands
6 points	Romania	United Kingdom
5 points	Bulgaria	Australia
4 points	Italy	Sweden
3 points	Hungary	Croatia
2 points	Poland	Austria
1 point	Netherlands	Hungary

==== Detailed voting results ====
The following members comprised the German jury:

- Nicole Seibert (Nicole; jury chairperson) – singer, winner of the Eurovision Song Contest 1982
- Joy Denalane – singer
- Adel Tawil – singer
- Wincent Weiss – singer-songwriter
- Andreas Herbig (Boogieman) – music producer

Detailed voting results from Germany (Semi-final 2)
R/O	Country	Jury							Televote	
R/O	Country	Nicole	J. Denalane	A. Tawil	W. Weiss	Boogieman	Rank	Points	Rank	Points
01	Serbia	10	2	6	6	3	4	7	13	
02	Austria	5	5	7	8	4	5	6	7	4
03	Macedonia	12	18	18	17	14	17		14	
04	Malta	6	8	8	7	11	8	3	16	
05	Romania	17	17	17	18	13	18		4	7
06	Netherlands	2	3	5	3	5	3	8	6	5
07	Hungary	13	14	9	11	10	11		2	10
08	Denmark	14	7	10	9	8	10	1	18	
09	Ireland	7	10	4	5	7	7	4	15	
10	San Marino	16	13	12	16	17	16		10	1
11	Croatia	1	6	13	4	6	6	5	5	6
12	Norway	3	1	1	1	1	1	12	9	2
13	Switzerland	11	12	3	10	9	9	2	12	
14	Belarus	18	11	15	15	12	14		11	
15	Bulgaria	4	4	2	2	2	2	10	1	12
16	Lithuania	15	16	14	13	15	15		17	
17	Estonia	8	15	11	12	16	12		8	3
18	Israel	9	9	16	14	18	13		3	8

Detailed voting results from Germany (Final)
R/O	Country	Jury							Televote	
R/O	Country	Nicole	J. Denalane	A. Tawil	W. Weiss	Boogieman	Rank	Points	Rank	Points
01	Israel	18	22	22	25	21	25		16	
02	Poland	19	7	13	14	17	15		9	2
03	Belarus	20	20	19	20	13	18		18	
04	Austria	10	6	12	6	12	9	2	14	
05	Armenia	21	21	20	18	20	20		19	
06	Netherlands	6	4	7	7	4	4	7	10	1
07	Moldova	12	23	17	21	22	19		4	7
08	Hungary	11	9	8	9	11	10	1	8	3
09	Italy	2	19	3	16	23	13		7	4
10	Denmark	13	13	9	10	10	11		25	
11	Portugal	1	1	2	5	3	2	10	1	12
12	Azerbaijan	14	24	21	22	25	23		23	
13	Croatia	4	12	16	8	5	8	3	3	8
14	Australia	5	8	11	3	9	6	5	15	
15	Greece	23	18	23	24	14	22		11	
16	Spain	22	17	25	19	24	24		24	
17	Norway	3	3	1	1	1	1	12	20	
18	United Kingdom	16	5	4	4	6	5	6	22	
19	Cyprus	17	14	24	17	18	17		17	
20	Romania	24	25	14	23	16	21		5	6
21	Germany									
22	Ukraine	15	11	18	12	8	14		21	
23	Belgium	7	15	10	15	15	12		2	10
24	Sweden	9	10	6	11	7	7	4	12	
25	Bulgaria	8	2	5	2	2	3	8	6	5
26	France	25	16	15	13	19	16		13	
