= You Let Me Walk Alone =

2018 song by Michael Schulte

Single by Michael Schulte

from the album Dreamer
- Released: 20 February 2018
- Length: 2:57
- Label: Very Us
- Songwriters: Michael Schulte; Thomas Stengaard; Nisse Ingwersen; Nina Müller

Michael Schulte singles chronology
"Falling Apart" (2017)	"You Let Me Walk Alone" (2018)	"Never Let You Down" (2018)

Music video
- "You Let Me Walk Alone" on YouTube

Eurovision Song Contest 2018 entry
- Country: Germany
- Artist: Michael Schulte
- Language: English
- Composers: Michael Schulte; Thomas Stengaard; Nisse Ingwersen; Nina Müller
- Lyricists: Michael Schulte; Thomas Stengaard; Nisse Ingwersen; Nina Müller

Finals performance
- Final result: 4th
- Final points: 340

Entry chronology
- ◄ "Perfect Life" (2017)
- "Sister" (2019) ►

"You Let Me Walk Alone" is a song by German singer Michael Schulte. Conceived during a songwriting camp in the run-up to Unser Lied für Lissabon, the German national selection for the Eurovision Song Contest 2018, it was written by Schulte along with Thomas Stengaard, Nisse Ingwersen, and Katharina "Nina" Müller, while production was helmed by Stengaard, Jan-Philipp Kelber, and Joachim Schlüter. A tribute to Schulte's father, who died when the singer was 14, the song is an emotive piano ballad.

Eventually chosen to represent Germany in the contest in Lisbon, Portugal, it ended up coming fourth in the Grand Final, thus becoming Germany's best placing song since Lena's victory at the 2010 contest in Oslo, Norway and their second-best result of the 21st century overall by then. Released by Very Us Records as a digital download on 20 February 2018, it reached number three on the German Singles Chart and entered the top 20 in Belgium, Iceland, and the Netherlands after Schulte's performance on 12 May 2018.

== Eurovision Song Contest ==
Schulte was first confirmed as a competitor in Unser Lied für Lissabon, the German national selection for the Eurovision Song Contest 2018, on 29 December 2017. On 13 February 2018, his song was revealed to be titled "You Let Me Walk Alone". The song was released on 20 February. He competed in the final on 22 February, where he received the maximum twelve points from the Eurovision panel, international jury, and televoters, winning the competition. As Germany is a member of the "Big Five", the song automatically advanced to the final, held on 12 May 2018 in Lisbon, Portugal.

== Track listing ==
Digital download
No.	Title	Length
1.	"You Let Me Walk Alone"	2:57

== Charts ==
Weekly chart performance for "You Let Me Walk Alone"
Chart (2018)	Peak position
Austria (Ö3 Austria Top 40)	23
Belgium (Ultratip Bubbling Under Flanders)	13
France (SNEP)	105
Germany (GfK)	3
Iceland (RÚV)	14
Netherlands (Dutch Top 40)	19
Netherlands (Single Top 100)	83
Scottish Singles Sales (Official Charts)	36
Spain (PROMUSICAE)	74
Sweden (Sverigetopplistan)	32
Switzerland (Schweizer Hitparade)	27
UK Singles Downloads (Official Charts)	43
UK Indie (Official Charts)	44

== Certifications ==
Certifications for "You Let Me Walk Alone"
Region	Certification	Certified units/sales
Germany (BVMI)	Gold	200,000^{‡}
Netherlands (NVPI)	Gold	40,000^{‡}
^{‡} Sales+streaming figures based on certification alone.

== Release history ==
Release dates for "You Let Me Walk Alone"
Region	Date	Format	Label
Various	20 February 2018	Digital download	Very Us
