= Neue Volksmusik =

Music genre

- Etymology: German for "New Folk Music"
- Other names: Volxmusik, Tradimix
- Stylistic origins: Volksmusik; pop; rock and roll; swing; country; folk
- Cultural origins: 1970's Germany
- Typical instruments: Guitar; electric guitar; bass guitar; drums; keyboard; saxophone; accordion; steel guitar
- Derivative forms: Dansband

Regional scenes
- Central Europe, Northern Europe, Southeastern Europe

Other topics
- Music of Germany

Neue Volksmusik (sometimes also called Volxmusik or Tradimix; English for "New folk music") describes the crossover mix of traditional German folk music (Volksmusik) with newer genres such as jazz, contemporary folk, electronic music, and/or rock.

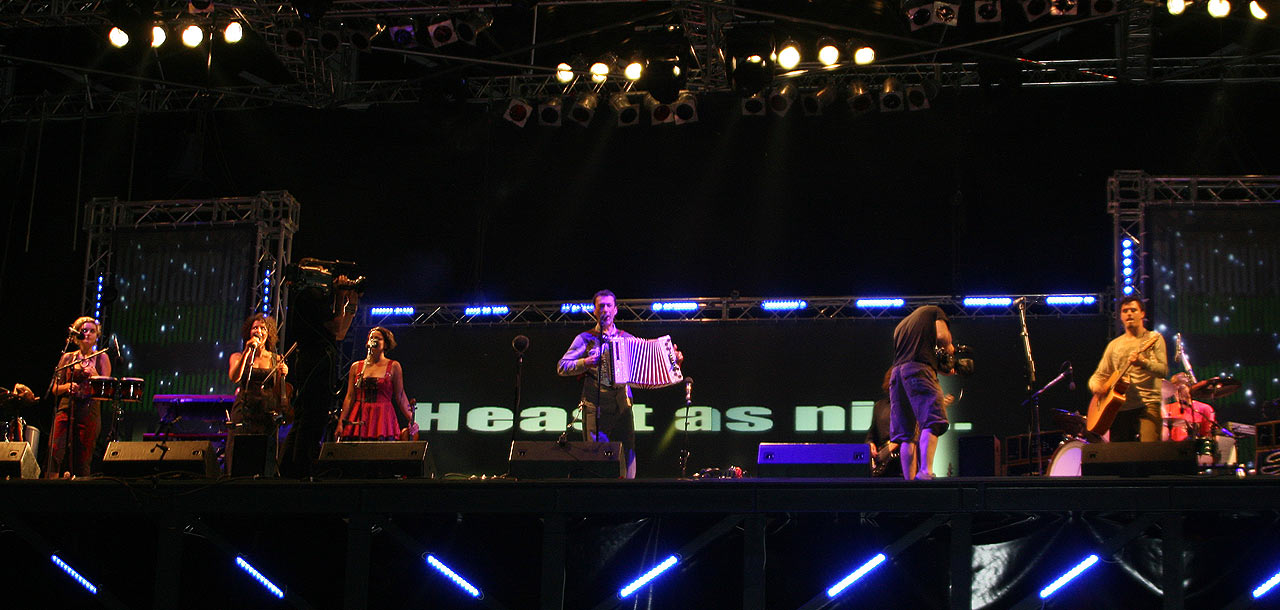
Hubert von Goisern

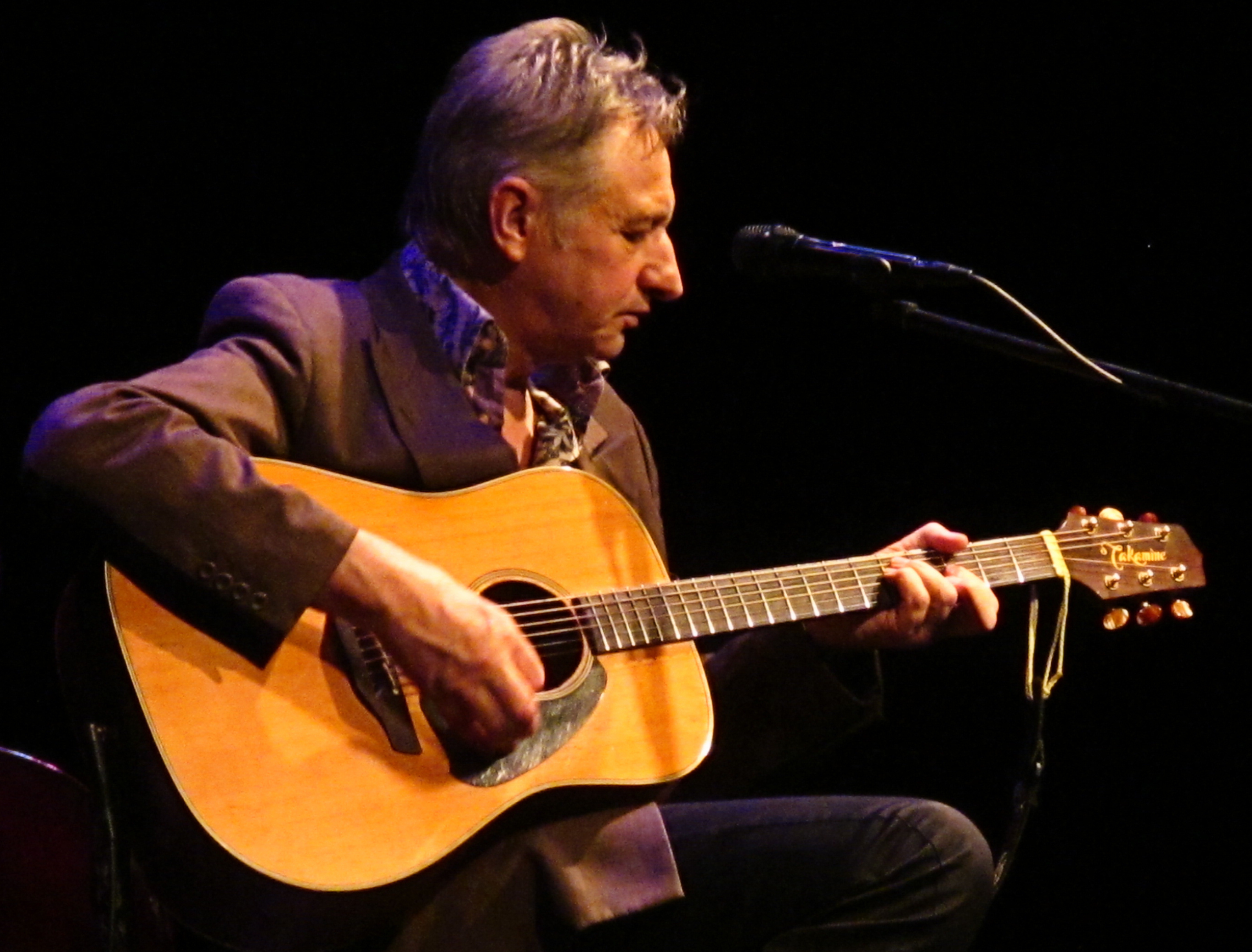
Georg Ringsgwandl (2011)

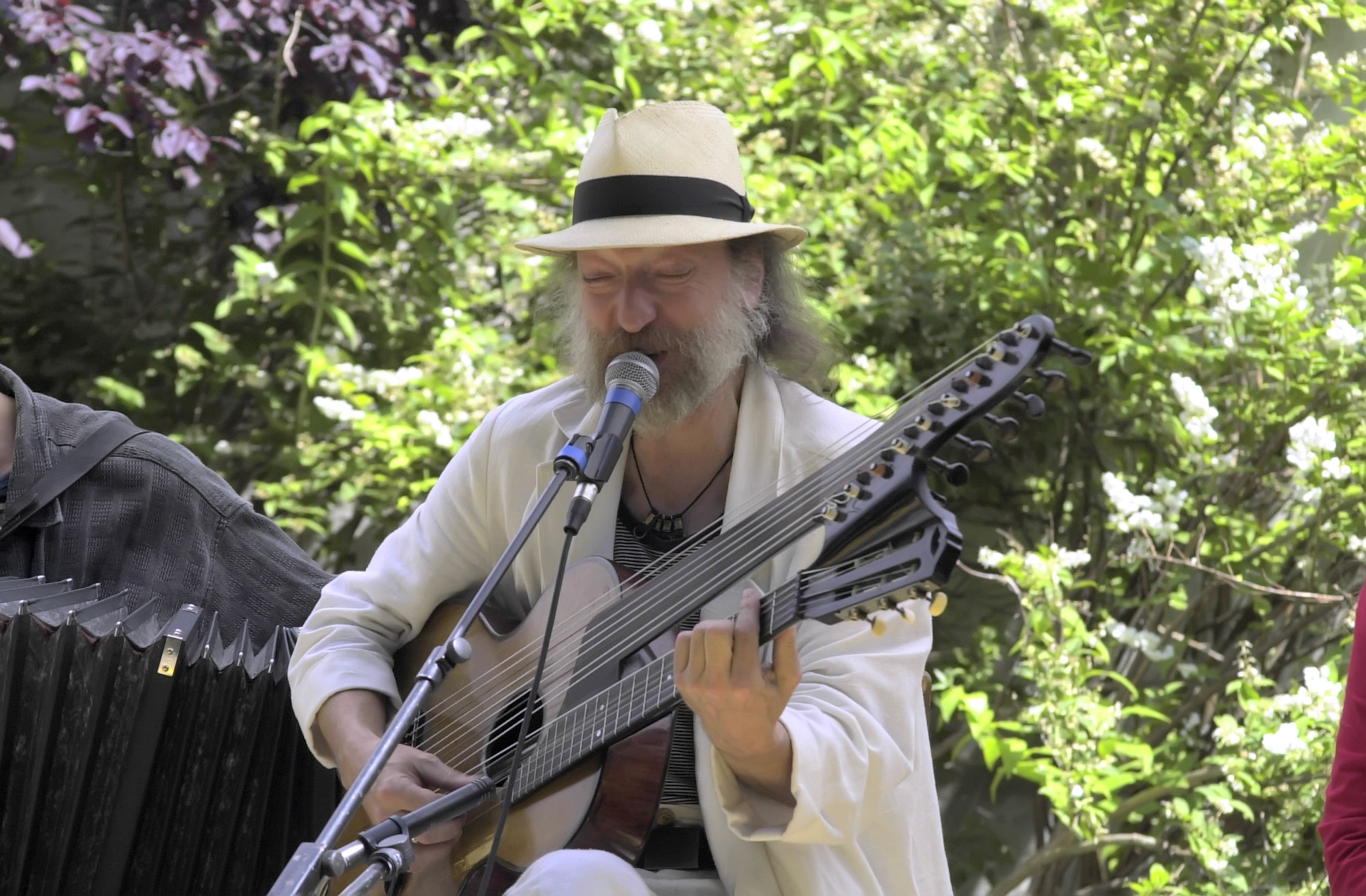
Roland Neuwirth
