= Perfect Life (Levina song) =

2017 single by Levina

Single by Levina

from the album Unexpected
- Released: 9 February 2017
- Length: 3:01
- Label: Sony
- Songwriter(s): Lindsey Ray; Lindy Robbins; Dave Bassett
- Producer(s): Roland Spremberg

Levina singles chronology
| "Divided" (2016) | "Perfect Life" (2017) | "Stop Right There" (2017) |

Eurovision Song Contest 2017 entry
- Country: Germany
- Artist(s): Levina
- Language: English
- Composer(s): Lindsey Ray; Lindy Robbins; Dave Bassett
- Lyricist(s): Lindsey Ray; Lindy Robbins; Dave Bassett

Finals performance
- Final result: 25th
- Final points: 6

Entry chronology
- ◄ "Ghost" (2016)
- "You Let Me Walk Alone" (2018) ►

"Perfect Life" is a song by German singer Levina. It was written by Lindsey Ray, Lindy Robbins, and Dave Bassett and produced by Roland Spremberg. Having won Unser Song 2017, the song served as the Germany entry at the Eurovision Song Contest 2017 in Kyiv, where it finished in 25th. Issued as a single, it was released as a digital download on 9 February 2017 through Sony Music Entertainment Germany and later included on Levina's debut studio album Unexpected (2017).

== Eurovision Song Contest ==
On 6 January 2017, Levina was confirmed to be one of the five finalists competing in Unser Song 2017, Germany's national final for the Eurovision Song Contest 2017. On 9 February 2017, the night of the final, Levina advanced to the final round with both the songs "Wildfire" and "Perfect Life". The German public then chose "Perfect Life" as the winner. As Germany is a member of the "Big Five", she automatically advanced to the final, held on 13 May 2017 in Kyiv, Ukraine.

== Criticism ==
The song became a subject of controversy due to its alleged similarities with other well-known songs such as "Titanium" by David Guetta, to which a possible plagiarism is discussed. Several news sites and blogs also had discussed a possible plagiarism of "Perfect Life" from "Young and Wild", a song composed by Aleksandra Kovač for the 2014 German film of the same name.

== Track listing ==
Digital download
| No. | Title | Writer(s) | Producer(s) | Length |
|---|---|---|---|---|
| 1. | "Wildfire" | Marit Larsen; Greg Holden; Tofer Brown | Swen Meyer | 3:10 |
| 2. | "Perfect Life" | Lindsey Ray; Lindy Robbins; Dave Bassett | Roland Spremberg | 3:01 |
| 3. | "Wildfire" (Instrumental) | Larsen; Holden; Brown | Meyer | 3:10 |
| 4. | "Perfect Life" (Instrumental) | Ray; Robbins; Bassett | Spremberg | 3:01 |

== Charts ==
Weekly chart performance for "Perfect Life"
| Chart (2017) | Peak position |
|---|---|
| Germany (GfK) | 28 |

== Release history ==
Release dates and formats for "Perfect Life"
| Region | Date | Format | Label |
|---|---|---|---|
| Worldwide | 9 February 2017 | Digital download | Sony Music Entertainment Germany |
