= Romania in the Eurovision Song Contest 2018 =

- Eurovision Song Contest 2018
- Participating broadcaster: Televiziunea Română (TVR)
- Country: Romania
- Selection process: Selecția Națională 2018
- Selection date: 25 February 2018

Competing entry
- Song: "Goodbye"
- Artist: The Humans
- Songwriters: Alexandru Matei; Alin Neagoe; Cristina Caramarcu

Placement
- Semi-final result: Failed to qualify (11th)

Participation chronology

Romania was represented at the Eurovision Song Contest 2018 with the song "Goodbye" written by Alexandru Matei, Alin Neagoe and Cristina Caramarcu. The song was performed by the Humans. The Romanian broadcaster Televiziunea Română (TVR) organised the national final Selecția Națională 2018 in order to select the Romanian entry for the 2018 contest in Lisbon, Portugal. The national final consisted of six shows: five semi-finals and a final. A total of sixty entries were selected and twelve competed in each semi-final where a five-member jury panel selected three entries to advance to the final. The fifteen qualifiers competed in the final on 25 February 2018 where "Goodbye" performed by The Humans was selected as the winner entirely by a public vote.

Romania was drawn to compete in the second semi-final of the Eurovision Song Contest which took place on 10 May 2018. Performing during the show in position 2, "Goodbye" was not announced among the top 10 entries of the second semi-final and therefore did not qualify to compete in the final. This broken the qualifying streak for 13 years. This marked the first time that Romania failed to qualify to the final of the Eurovision Song Contest from a semi-final since the introduction of semi-finals in 2004. It was later revealed that Romania placed eleventh out of the 18 participating countries in the semi-final with 107 points.

== Background ==
Prior to the 2018 contest, Romania had participated in the Eurovision Song Contest 18 times since its first entry in 1994. To this point, its highest placing in the contest has been third place, which the nation achieved on two occasions: in 2005 with the song "Let Me Try" performed by Luminița Anghel and Sistem, and in 2010 with the song "Playing with Fire" performed by Paula Seling and Ovi. To this point, Romania has qualified to the final on every occasion since the introduction of semi-finals to the format of the contest in 2004. After returning to the contest in 2017 following their forced one-year absence in 2016 due to repeated non-payment of debts to the EBU, "Yodel It!" by Ilinca featuring Alex Florea placed 7th in the final.

The Romanian national broadcaster, Televiziunea Română (TVR), broadcasts the event within Romania and organizes the selection process for the nation's entry. TVR has consistently selected the Romanian Eurovision entry through national finals that feature a competition among several artists and songs. The broadcaster confirmed their intentions to participate at the 2018 Eurovision Song Contest on 7 July 2017. TVR had set up national finals with several artists to choose both the song and performer to compete at Eurovision for Romania, a procedure which the broadcaster opted for once again to select their 2018 entry.

== Before Eurovision ==
=== Selecția Națională 2018 ===
Cities where the shows took place. The location of the final is shown in bold.

Selecția Națională 2018 was the national final organised by TVR in order to select Romania's entry for the Eurovision Song Contest 2018. The competition consisted of six shows: five semi-finals featuring twelve songs each and a final featuring fifteen songs to be held between 21 January and 25 February 2018. Under the slogan Eurovision unește România! (Eurovision unites Romania!), the shows took place in different cities across Romania in celebration of the 100th anniversary of the Union of Transylvania with Romania (also known locally as the "Great Union") and were hosted by Diana Dumitrescu and Cezar Ouatu who represented Romania in 2013. Several host cities contributed financially towards organising the event: the city of Timișoara contributed €43,000 for the second semi-final, the city of Craiova contributed €40,795 for the third semi-final, and the city of Turda contributed approximately €30,000 for fourth semi-final.

The six shows were televised on TVR1, TVR HD, TVRi as well as online via the broadcaster's streaming service TVR+ and YouTube. The six shows were also broadcast in Moldova via the channel TVR Moldova. TVR hosted behind-the-scenes programmes the day prior to each show which contained interviews and pre-recorded inserts such as rehearsal, press conference footage and other backstage material.

Cities and venues of Selecția Națională 2018
Show	Date	City	Venue
Semi-final 1	21 January 2018	Focșani	Teatrul Municipal "Maior Gheorghe Pastia"
Semi-final 2	28 January 2018	Timișoara	Teatrul Național "Mihai Eminescu"
Semi-final 3	4 February 2018	Craiova	Teatrul Național "Marin Sorescu"
Semi-final 4	11 February 2018	Turda	Rudolf Mine, Salina Turda
Semi-final 5	18 February 2018	Sighișoara	Sala de Spectacole "Mihai Eminescu"
Final	25 February 2018	Bucharest	Sala Polivalentă

==== Competing entries ====
TVR opened a submission period for artists and composers to submit their entries between 15 November 2017 and 15 December 2017. The broadcaster received 72 submissions after the submission deadline passed, of which 68 participated in auditions held on 19 and 20 December 2017 at the TVR Studio 2 in Bucharest. The auditions were later broadcast on TVR1 and TVR HD between 12 and 15 January 2018. A jury panel consisting of Marian Ionescu (bass guitarist, pianist, composer), Liliana Ștefan (lyricist), Nicu Patoi (guitarist), Ilinca Băcilă (singer, represented Romania in 2017) and Viorel Gavrilă (composer, conductor) reviewed the performances during the auditions and rated each song between 1 (lowest) and 10 (highest) based on criteria such as the melodic harmony and structure of the song, the orchestral arrangement, originality and stylistic diversity of the composition and sound and voice quality. After the combination of the jury votes, the top sixty entries that scored the highest were selected for the national final. The competing entries were announced on 22 December 2017. Among the competing artists was Mihai and Alex Florea, who previously represented Romania in 2006 and 2017, respectively.

On 9 January 2018, "Fix Me", written by Ioana Victoria Badea and Alexandru Daniel Gajaila and to have been performed by Freia was disqualified from the competition due to the song having been released in China prior to 1 September 2017. The entry was replaced with the song "Baby You're the Only One" performed by Tomer Cohen. On 21 January 2018, Tom Hartis withdrew his song "Teardrop Rain", which was set to compete on the first semi-final, for health reasons.

Artist	Song	Songwriter(s)
Alessandro Dănescu	"Breaking Up"	John Ballard, Jonathan Dahl, Robin Carlsson, Marcus Holmberg
Alex Florea	"Nobody Told Me It Would Hurt"	Jonas Thander, Aidan O'Connor
Alexandru Ungureanu	"Sail with Me"	Alexandru Ungureanu
Alexia and Matei	"Walking on Water"	Mihai Alexandru, Alina Todașcă-Dascălu
Alice Jeckel	"Out of the Dark"	Cezar Dometi, Alice Jeckel
Aurel Dincă	"Fire in the Sky"	Aurel Dincă, Victor Solomon
Ayona	"The Story Goes On"	Ovidiu Anton
Bernice Chitiul	"Too Busy for My Heart"	Florin Chitiul, Bernice Chitiul
Carolina Gorun	"Reach Out for the Stars"	Peter Jordan, Jannis Kaffka, Lenne Kaffka, Andre Bollweg
Claudia Andas	"The One"	Samuel Bugia Garrido, Roxana Elekes
Cornel	"Take Me Away"	Ștefan-Suraj Trandafir, Cornel-Ionuț Ciubotaru
Cristian Simionescu	"Nirvana"	Cristian Simionescu
Dan Manciulea	"Rază de soare"	Dan Manciulea, Dinu Olărașu
Denisa Trofin	"Tears"	Alexandru Luft, Tiberiu Băncilă
Diana Brătan	"Paint It Rainbow"	Diana Brătan
Dora Gaitanovici	"Fără tine"	Dora Gaitanovici
Echoes	"Mirror"	Liviu Elekes, Claudiu Dănăilă, Pavel Petricenco
Eduard Santha	"Me som romales"	Alexandru Luft, Eduard Santha
Elena Hasna	"Revival"	Ylva Persson, Linda Persson, Dan Attlerud
Elena Turcu	"The Perfect Fall"	Marian Nica, Alexandra Ivan
Eliza Chifu	"So Good Without You"	Valeriu Moruz, Doina Sclifos
Endless feat. Maria Grosu	"Thinking About You"	Will Taylor, Jonas Gladnikoff
Erminio Sinni and Tiziana Camelin	"All the Love Away"	Erminio Sinni, Mauro Goldsand, Alessandro Camponeschi, Tiziana Camelin
Evermorph	"Live Your Life"	Alin Neagoe, Ciprian Lemnaru, Alexandru Rotărescu
Feli	"Bună de iubit" (Note: During the auditions, Feli performed the Spanish version of the song, "Fácil de amar")	Felicia Donose, Florin Boka, Vlad Popescu, Șerban Cazan
Feli	"Bună de iubit (Royalty)"	Felicia Donose, Florin Boka, Vlad Popescu, Șerban Cazan, Cristi Pascu, Dorian Micu, Vlad Munteanu
Hellen	"From Underneath"	John Ballard, Magnus Hydén
The Humans	"Goodbye"	Alexandru Matei, Alin Neagoe, Cristina Caramarcu
Iliana	"I Won't Lie"	George Lazăr, Eduard Taraș, Elena Moroșanu
Ioana Ciornea	"Time After Time"	Daniel Lazăr, Dominic Cini, Christian Arding, Mario Farrugia
Jessie	"Lightning Strikes"	Pelle Blarke, Ellie Wyatt, Amy Amanda van der Wel
Johnny Bădulescu	"Devoted"	Michael James Down, Primož Poglajen, Jonas Gladnikoff
Jukebox feat. Bella Santiago	"Auzi cum bate"	Alex Luft, Bogdan Marinescu, Cristina Dobrescu
Lina	"A Love Worth Falling For"	Lina Sandén, Gustav Nilsson, Johan Smith
Lion's Roar	"Rekindle the Flame"	Liviu Sorescu
Liviu Anghel	"Rise Up"	Bogdan Marian Păunescu, Liviu Anghel, Ana-Maria Mirică
Manuel Chivari	"Somebody to Love"	Michael James Down, Will Taylor
Mareș Pană	"Daydreamer"	Mareș-Cătălin Pană, Georgian Mărgărit, Ștefan-Adrian Marin
Maria Suciu	"Sweet Nothing"	Mădălin Botezatu
Meriem	"End the Battle"	Meriem Vizitiu, Mihail Gheorghe, Marian Achim
Mihai	"Heaven"	Michael James Down, Will Taylor, Jonas Gladnikoff, Mihai Trăistariu
Miruna Diaconescu	"Run for You"	Radu Pompiu Bolfea, Marcel Prodan
Nicoleta Țicală	"Una oportunidad"	Samuel Bugia Garrido
Othello	"Noi suntem pădure"	Florentin Milcof, Laura Sgârcitu
Paula Crișan	"I Am Here"	Paula Crișan
Pragu' de Sus	"Te voi chema"	Călin Bârcean
Rafael and Friends	"We Are One"	Rafael, Alexandru Nucă
Romeo Zaharia	"Maybe This Time"	Fred Endersen, Olaf Owre
Save	"All We Need"	Stelian Savu, Vlad Isac
Serena	"Safari"	Radu Baișan, Nicolae Stan, Diana Șerban, Mircea Nistor
Sergiu Bolotă	"Every Little Thing"	Sergiu Bolotă
Tavi Clonda	"King"	Alex Luft, Tavi Clonda, Cristina Dobrescu, Alexandru Duma, Denisa Demian, Alina Colțan
Teodora Dinu	"Fly"	Thomas Reil, Jeppe Reil, Udo Mechels, Maria Broberg
Tiri	"Deșert de sentimente"	Mihail Tirică
Tomer Cohen	"Baby You're the Only One"	Tomer Cohen
Vyros	"La la la"	Vladimir Cioban
Waleska	"Renacer" (Note: During the auditions, Waleska performed the English version of the song, "Reborn")	Waleska Díaz González
Xandra	"Try"	Michael James Down, Will Taylor, Jonas Gladnikoff
Zavera	"Come Back to Me"	Florin Octav Ionescu, Petre Bogdan, Marian Mihai, Raluca Răducanu, Ionuț Fleancu, Vasile Simion, Marilena Ionescu, Cristian Costache
Zøltan	"Dacă dragostea e oarbă"	Sebestyén Zoltán László

==== Semi-finals ====
The five semi-finals took place between 21 January and 28 February 2018 with different presenters hosting segments from the green room in each show: Anca Medeleanu in the first semi-final, Doriana Talpeș in the second semi-final, Alina Șerban in the third semi-final, Loredana Corchiș in the four semi-final and Simona Boantă in the fifth semi-final. In each semi-final twelve songs competed and a jury panel selected three songs to qualify to the final. The members of the jury panel that voted during the semi-finals were: Marian Ionescu (bass guitarist, pianist, composer), Liliana Ștefan (lyricist), Nicu Patoi (guitarist), Ilinca Băcilă (singer, represented Romania in 2017) and Viorel Gavrilă (composer, conductor).

In addition to the performances of the competing entries, the opening act featured 2005 Romanian Eurovision entrant Luminița Anghel performing the 2009 Moldovan Eurovision song "Hora din Moldova" with the Țara Vrancei Folk Ensemble in the first semi-final and Ricardo Caria performing the Eurovision Song Contest 2017 winning song "Amar pelos dois" in the second semi-final, while the interval act featured performances by the band Pasărea Rock in the first semi-final, Cargo, Lavinia Răducanu and Neda Ukraden in the second semi-final, BiBi, FreeStay, Dan Helciug and Mihaela Alexa in the third semi-final, 2009 Romanian Eurovision entrant Elena Gheorghe, Ad Libitum and Katia Cărbune in the fourth semi-final, and the band Direcția 5 in the fifth semi-final; their performance was filmed earlier at the Piața Cetății in Sighișoara on 17 February 2018.

Semi-final 1 – 21 January 2018
R/O	Artist	Song	Jury Votes					Total	Place
R/O	Artist	Song	M. Ionescu	L. Ștefan	N. Patoi	I. Băcilă	V. Gavrilă	Total	Place
1	Alex Florea	"Nobody Told Me It Would Hurt"	4	8	6	6	4	28	5
2	Lina	"A Love Worth Falling For"	8	3	3	4	6	24	7
3	Cornel	"Take Me Away"			1	1		2	11
4	Liviu Anghel	"Rise Up"	3	2	5	3	7	20	9
5	Hellen	"From Underneath"	7	4	4	5	2	22	8
6	**Alexia and Matei**	**"Walking on Water"**	**12**	**12**	7	10	**12**	**53**	**1**
7	Johnny Bădulescu	"Devoted"	2	6	8	8	10	34	4
8	Waleska	"Renacer"	5	1			1	7	10
9	**Echoes**	**"Mirror"**	6	7	10	7	8	**38**	**2**
10	Elena Turcu	"The Perfect Fall"	10	10	2	2	3	27	6
11	**Eduard Santha**	**"Me som romales"**	1	5	**12**	**12**	5	**35**	**3**

Semi-final 2 – 28 January 2018
R/O	Artist	Song	Jury Votes					Total	Place
R/O	Artist	Song	M. Ionescu	L. Ștefan	N. Patoi	I. Băcilă	V. Gavrilă	Total	Place
1	Pragu' de Sus	"Te voi chema"	5	2	4	2	6	19	7
2	Miruna Diaconescu	"Run for You"	6	4	1	6	5	22	5
3	**Mihai**	**"Heaven"**	4	5	10	10	10	**39**	**3**
4	Othello	"Noi suntem pădure"	7	1	5		4	17	8
5	Alessandro Dănescu	"Breaking Up"	3	7		4	1	15	11
6	Jessie	"Lightning Strikes"		8	7	8	3	26	4
7	Romeo Zaharia	"Maybe This Time"	1		6	1	8	16	10
8	**Rafael and Friends**	**"We Are One"**	**12**	10	8	3	7	**40**	**2**
9	Serena	"Safari"	2	3	3	7	2	17	9
10	Endless feat. Maria Grosu	"Thinking About You"	8	6	2	5		21	6
11	Meriem	"End the Battle"						0	12
13	**Jukebox feat. Bella Santiago**	**"Auzi cum bate"**	10	**12**	**12**	**12**	**12**	**58**	**1**

Semi-final 3 – 4 February 2018
R/O	Artist	Song	Jury Votes					Total	Place
R/O	Artist	Song	M. Ionescu	L. Ștefan	N. Patoi	I. Băcilă	V. Gavrilă	Total	Place
1	Eliza Chifu	"So Good Without You"	4	6		3		13	9
2	Carolina Gorun	"Reach Out for the Stars"		5	5	6	1	17	8
3	Mareș Pană	"Daydreamer"	1	3			3	7	11
4	Ayona	"The Story Goes On"	3	2	2	1		8	10
5	Aurel Dincă	"Fire in the Sky"	7		6	2	4	19	7
6	**Vyros**	**"La la la"**	8	10	3	8	8	**37**	**3**
7	Zavera	"Come Back to Me"	5	4	4	5	7	25	6
8	Elena Hasna	"Revival"	2	7	7	7	2	25	5
9	Diana Brătan	"Paint It Rainbow"			1		5	6	12
10	Tavi Clonda	"King"	6	1	**12**	4	6	29	4
11	**Erminio Sinni and Tiziana Camelin**	**"All the Love Away"**	**12**	**12**	8	10	10	**52**	**1**
12	**Xandra**	**"Try"**	10	8	10	**12**	**12**	**52**	**1**

Semi-final 4 – 11 February 2018
R/O	Artist	Song	Jury Votes					Total	Place
R/O	Artist	Song	M. Ionescu	L. Ștefan	N. Patoi	I. Băcilă	V. Gavrilă	Total	Place
1	Bernice Chitiul	"Too Busy for My Heart"		2	3	3	3	11	10
2	Cristian Simionescu	"Nirvana"						0	12
3	Nicoleta Țicală	"Una oportunidad"	10	7	7	6	10	40	4
4	Zøltan	"Dacă dragostea e oarbă"	6	1	1	4		12	8
5	Alice Jeckel	"Out of the Dark"	2	3	4	2	1	12	9
6	Dan Manciulea	"Rază de soare"	1				2	3	11
7	Lion's Roar	"Rekindle the Flame"	5	6	6	5	7	29	5
8	Ioana Ciornea	"Time After Time"	3	5	5	7	4	24	6
9	**Tiri**	**"Deșert de sentimente"**	8	10	8	**12**	5	**43**	**2**
10	**Feli**	**"Bună de iubit"**	7	8	10	10	8	**43**	**3**
11	Paula Crișan	"I Am Here"	4	4	2	1	6	17	7
12	**Claudia Andas**	**"The One"**	**12**	**12**	**12**	8	**12**	**56**	**1**

Semi-final 5 – 18 February 2018
R/O	Artist	Song	Jury Votes					Total	Place
R/O	Artist	Song	M. Ionescu	L. Ștefan	N. Patoi	I. Băcilă	V. Gavrilă	Total	Place
1	Manuel Chivari	"Somebody to Love"	2	6	1	5	6	20	7
2	Maria Suciu	"Sweet Nothing"					2	2	11
3	Evermorph	"Live Your Life"	1	2	5	1		9	10
4	**Dora Gaitanovici**	**"Fără tine"**	8	8	10	8	8	**42**	**3**
5	Tomer Cohen	"Baby You're the Only One"					1	1	12
6	Sergiu Bolotă	"Every Little Thing"	5	7	7	4	5	28	4
7	Alexandru Ungureanu	"Sail with Me"	6	3	2	2	4	17	8
8	Iliana	"I Won't Lie"	7	4	3	7		21	6
9	**Teodora Dinu**	**"Fly"**	10	**12**	8	10	10	**50**	**2**
10	**The Humans**	**"Goodbye"**	**12**	10	**12**	**12**	**12**	**58**	**1**
11	Save	"All We Need"	3	1	4	3	3	14	9
12	Denisa Trofin	"Tears"	4	5	6	6	7	28	5

==== Final ====
The final took place on 25 February 2018 with Ioana Voicu and Sonia Argint-Ionescu hosting segments from the green room. Fifteen songs competed and the winner, "Goodbye" performed by the Humans, was selected exclusively by public televoting. In addition to the performances of the competing entries, the interval acts featured performances by 2017 Romanian Eurovision entrant Ilinca Băcilă, 2018 Moldovan Eurovision entrants DoReDoS performing their Eurovision song "My Lucky Day", as well as performances by the Alex Calancea Band.

Final – 25 February 2018
R/O	Artist	Song	Televote	Place
1	Rafael and Friends	"We Are One"	1,446	5
2	Tiri	"Deșert de sentimente"	320	12
3	Claudia Andas	"The One"	974	8
4	Echoes	"Mirror"	325	11
5	Dora Gaitanovici	"Fără tine"	1,415	6
6	Eduard Santha	"Me som romales"	293	14
7	Vyros	"La la la"	133	15
8	Feli	"Bună de iubit (Royalty)"	2,862	3
9	Teodora Dinu	"Fly"	336	10
10	Mihai	"Heaven"	1,165	7
11	Xandra	"Try"	686	9
12	Jukebox feat. Bella Santiago	"Auzi cum bate"	1,728	4
13	Alexia and Matei	"Walking on Water"	3,114	2
14	Erminio Sinni and Tiziana Camelin	"All the Love Away"	303	13
15	**The Humans**	**"Goodbye"**	**3,277**	**1**

=== Promotion ===
Prior to the contest, the Humans specifically promoted "Goodbye" as the Romanian Eurovision entry on 10 March 2018 by performing at the Romanian stand of the ITB Berlin event, which was held at the Internationales Congress Centrum Berlin in Germany.

== At Eurovision ==
According to Eurovision rules, all nations with the exceptions of the host country and the "Big Five" (France, Germany, Italy, Spain and the United Kingdom) are required to qualify from one of two semi-finals in order to compete for the final; the top ten countries from each semi-final progress to the final. The European Broadcasting Union (EBU) split up the competing countries into six different pots based on voting patterns from previous contests, with countries with favourable voting histories put into the same pot. On 29 January 2018, an allocation draw was held which placed each country into one of the two semi-finals, as well as which half of the show they would perform in. Romania was placed into the second semi-final, to be held on 10 May 2018, and was scheduled to perform in the first half of the show.

Once all the competing songs for the 2018 contest had been released, the running order for the semi-finals was decided by the shows' producers rather than through another draw, so that similar songs were not placed next to each other. Romania was set to perform in position 2, following the entry from Norway and before the entry from Serbia.

All three shows were broadcast in Romania on TVR1, TVRi and TVR HD with commentary by Liliana Ștefan and Radu Andrei Tudor. The Romanian spokesperson, who announced the top 12-point score awarded by the Romanian jury during the final, was Sonia Argint-Ionescu.

=== Semi-final ===
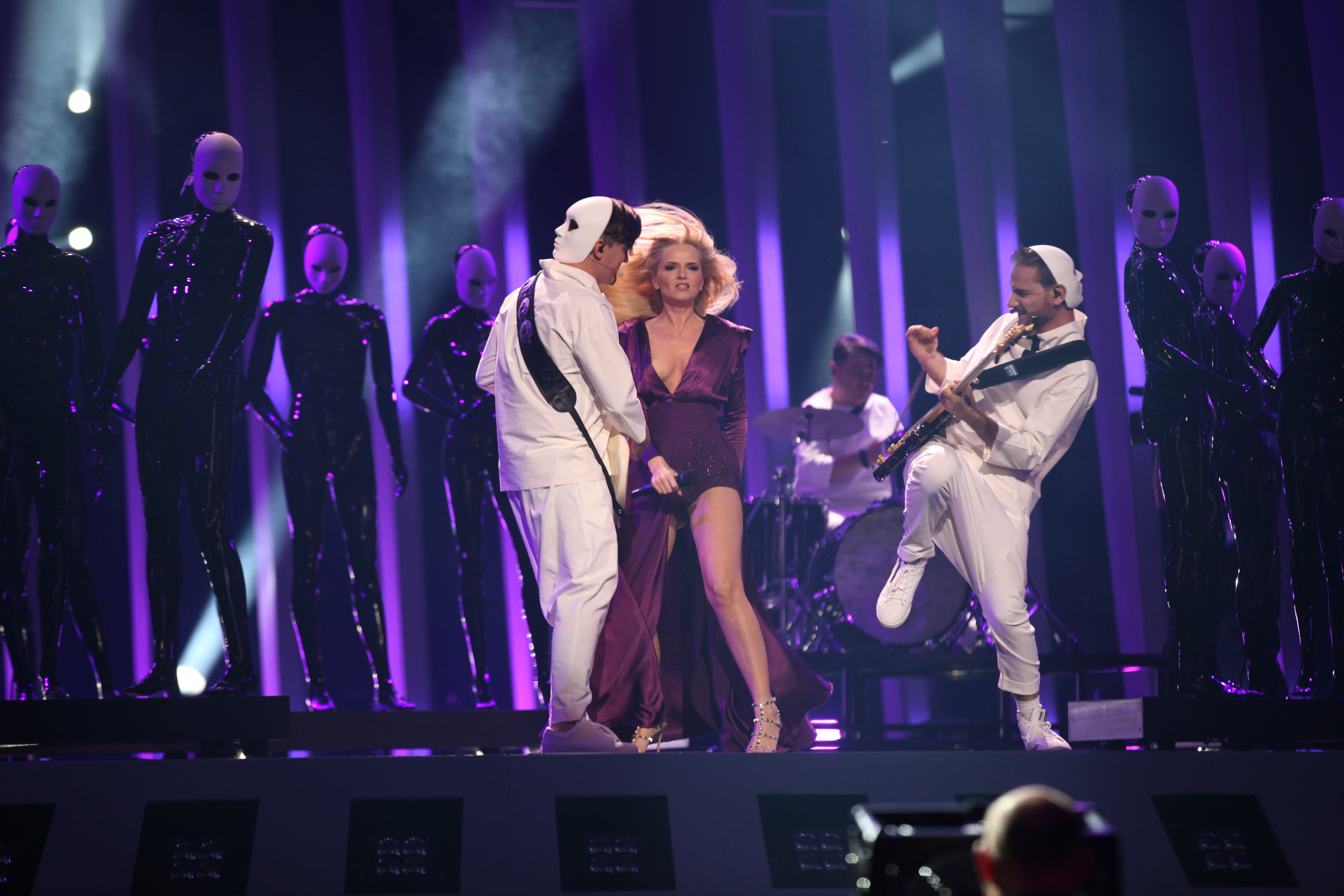
The Humans during a rehearsal before the second semi-final

The Humans took part in technical rehearsals on 1 and 4 May, followed by dress rehearsals on 9 and 10 May. This included the jury show on 9 May where the professional juries of each country watched and voted on the competing entries.

The stage show featured the members of the Humans (one of the lead singers of the band, Adrian Tănase, was replaced by cellist Corina Matei for the performance) performing in a band set-up with 25 black and white mannequins wearing white masks on their faces placed around the stage floor. The lead singer of the band Cristina Caramarcu was dressed in a purple frock while the remaining members were dressed in white outfits, of which the two guitarists wore white masks on the backs of their heads. In regards to the mannequins, the Humans stated: "All the mannequins represent humanity, the people. They don't have a face, you don't see a race, nothing. We're all humans, we are equal."

At the end of the show, Romania was not announced among the top 10 entries in the second semi-final and therefore failed to qualify to compete in the final. This marked the first time that Romania failed to qualify to the final of the Eurovision Song Contest from a semi-final since the introduction of semi-finals in 2004. It was later revealed that Romania placed eleventh in the semi-final, receiving a total of 107 points: 40 points from the televoting and 67 points from the juries.

=== Voting ===
Voting during the three shows involved each country awarding two sets of points from 1-8, 10 and 12: one from their professional jury and the other from televoting. Each nation's jury consisted of five music industry professionals who are citizens of the country they represent, with their names published before the contest to ensure transparency. This jury judged each entry based on: vocal capacity; the stage performance; the song's composition and originality; and the overall impression by the act. In addition, no member of a national jury was permitted to be related in any way to any of the competing acts in such a way that they cannot vote impartially and independently. The individual rankings of each jury member as well as the nation's televoting results were released shortly after the grand final.

Below is a breakdown of points awarded to Romania and awarded by Romania in the second semi-final and grand final of the contest, and the breakdown of the jury voting and televoting conducted during the two shows:

==== Points awarded to Romania ====
Points awarded to Romania (Semi-final 2)
Score	Televote	Jury
12 points	Italy; Moldova	Hungary; Moldova
10 points		
8 points	Georgia; France	Montenegro
7 points		
6 points		Georgia; Slovenia
5 points		
4 points		Russia
3 points		Latvia; Poland; Sweden
2 points		Malta; Netherlands; Norway; Ukraine
1 point		France; Serbia

==== Points awarded by Romania ====
Points awarded by Romania (Semi-final 2)
Score	Televote	Jury
12 points	Moldova	Moldova
10 points	Hungary	Malta
8 points	Denmark	Netherlands
7 points	Australia	Montenegro
6 points	Norway	Serbia
5 points	Ukraine	San Marino
4 points	Serbia	Slovenia
3 points	Netherlands	Hungary
2 points	Sweden	Norway
1 point	Russia	Latvia

Points awarded by Romania (Final)
Score	Televote	Jury
12 points	Moldova	Austria
10 points	Hungary	Spain
8 points	Israel	Netherlands
7 points	Cyprus	Moldova
6 points	Italy	Lithuania
5 points	Bulgaria	Cyprus
4 points	Germany	Germany
3 points	Czech Republic	Estonia
2 points	Denmark	Australia
1 point	Ireland	Slovenia

==== Detailed voting results ====
The following members comprised the Romanian jury:

- Mihai Mircea Alexandru (Al Mike; jury chairperson) – composer, music producer
- Nicu Patoi – musician
- Anca Lupeș – music business consultant
- Sanda Cepraga – sound director
- Gabi Cotabiță – musician

Detailed voting results from Romania (Semi-final 2)
R/O	Country	Jury							Televote	
R/O	Country	N. Patoi	A. Lupeș	S. Cepraga	G. Cotabiță	Al Mike	Rank	Points	Rank	Points
01	Norway	10	4	10	13	10	9	2	5	6
02	Romania									
03	Serbia	4	9	5	3	5	5	6	7	4
04	San Marino	5	8	4	7	4	6	5	17	
05	Denmark	17	15	14	14	16	16		3	8
06	Russia	16	17	12	17	15	15		10	1
07	Moldova	1	1	1	1	1	1	12	1	12
08	Netherlands	8	2	2	2	6	3	8	8	3
09	Australia	11	11	15	10	9	12		4	7
10	Georgia	15	16	16	16	17	17		16	
11	Poland	9	12	11	11	11	11		12	
12	Malta	2	3	3	8	2	2	10	14	
13	Hungary	6	6	8	5	8	8	3	2	10
14	Latvia	12	7	9	9	12	10	1	13	
15	Sweden	14	14	13	12	13	13		9	2
16	Montenegro	3	13	6	4	3	4	7	15	
17	Slovenia	7	5	7	6	7	7	4	11	
18	Ukraine	13	10	17	15	14	14		6	5

Detailed voting results from Romania (Final)
R/O	Country	Jury							Televote	
R/O	Country	N. Patoi	A. Lupeș	S. Cepraga	G. Cotabiță	Al Mike	Rank	Points	Rank	Points
01	Ukraine	17	18	21	21	17	20		21	
02	Spain	1	3	2	8	2	2	10	23	
03	Slovenia	13	14	14	2	11	10	1	25	
04	Lithuania	5	5	3	6	12	5	6	18	
05	Austria	4	1	1	3	4	1	12	20	
06	Estonia	8	2	7	5	14	8	3	12	
07	Norway	14	13	11	13	13	14		17	
08	Portugal	21	17	16	20	20	19		26	
09	United Kingdom	18	22	19	19	19	21		22	
10	Serbia	22	21	17	18	25	23		15	
11	Germany	7	4	4	17	5	7	4	7	4
12	Albania	11	7	24	10	15	13		13	
13	France	25	23	26	22	21	25		11	
14	Czech Republic	23	24	23	14	22	22		8	3
15	Denmark	26	26	25	26	23	26		9	2
16	Australia	12	11	8	4	7	9	2	14	
17	Finland	20	16	18	11	24	18		24	
18	Bulgaria	16	19	15	23	10	16		6	5
19	Moldova	6	15	5	9	1	4	7	1	12
20	Sweden	19	12	22	15	16	17		19	
21	Hungary	24	20	20	16	26	24		2	10
22	Israel	9	10	13	25	8	11		3	8
23	Netherlands	2	6	6	1	6	3	8	16	
24	Ireland	15	25	9	24	9	15		10	1
25	Cyprus	3	8	12	7	3	6	5	4	7
26	Italy	10	9	10	12	18	12		5	6
