= Goodbye (The Humans song) =

2018 single by The Humans

Single by The Humans
- Released: 12 January 2018
- Genre: Soft rock; pop rock
- Length: 3:00
- Label: Roton
- Songwriters: Alexandru Matei; Alin Neagoe; Cristina Caramarcu
- Producers: Alexandru Matei; Alin Neagoe

The Humans singles chronology
"Îndură inima" (2017)	"Goodbye" (2018)	"Binele meu" (2018)

Music video
- "Goodbye" on YouTube

Audio sample
- file; help

Eurovision Song Contest 2018 entry
- Country: Romania
- Artist: The Humans
- Language: English
- Composers: Alexandru Matei; Alin Neagoe
- Lyricist: Cristina Caramarcu

Finals performance
- Semi-final result: 11th
- Semi-final points: 107

Entry chronology
- ◄ "Yodel It!" (2017)
- "On a Sunday" (2019) ►

"Goodbye" is a song recorded by Romanian group The Humans, released on 12 January 2018 by Roton. The track was written by vocalist Cristina Caramarcu, while production and composition were handled by fellow members Alexandru Matei and Alin Neagoe. "Goodbye" is a 1980s-inspired soft rock and pop rock ballad whose instrumentation includes a cello; lyrically, it is a manifesto that discourages the abandonment of one's dreams. It also discusses the overcoming of suicidal ideation, depression and internal battles. Reviewers likened the track to the music of Bonnie Tyler, Celine Dion and Heart.

"Goodbye" represented Romania in the Eurovision Song Contest 2018 in Lisbon, Portugal after winning the pre-selection show Selecția Națională. The country failed to qualify for the Grand Final for the first time in their participation history. During their highly acclaimed show, The Humans performed choreography in front of several white and black, masked mannequins, representing depersonalization and the loss of identity in modern times. Music critics gave the song itself generally negative reviews, criticizing the recording as underwhelming; some expressed doubt that Romania would qualify.

To promote "Goodbye", the band performed the song on multiple occasions, including at the ITB Berlin in Germany, as well as in Israel, Spain and Portugal. An accompanying music video was directed by Anthony Icuagu and was uploaded onto Roton's official YouTube channel simultaneously with the single's release. It portrays The Humans in black outfits and features the use of white masks to allude to the equality of people.

== Background and composition ==
The Humans is a Romanian band consisting of vocalist Cristina Caramarcu, guitarist Alexandru Cismaru, keyboardist Alexandru Matei, bassist Alin Neagoe and drummer Adi Tetrade. They are joined by cellist Corina Matei. Written by Caramarcu and produced and composed by Matei and Neagoe, their "Goodbye" is a 1980s-inspired soft rock and pop rock ballad whose instrumentation includes a cello. It runs at a length of three minutes. Fabien Randanne of 20 minutes noted its "vintage" nature, while likening it to the works of Welsh singer Bonnie Tyler. De Telegraaf's Richard van de Crommert called it "Celine Dion meets Bonnie Tyler and a touch of Heart". The song's melody was composed in 2011 or 2012 by Neagoe, with the track being fully produced and recorded in 2017. All used instruments were recorded live separately.

Regarding the recording's lyrical message, Caramarcu said: "'Goodbye' is a manifesto [...] and an urge to motivate one another not to give up our dreams," adding: "Say 'goodbye' to all the emotions that keep us on the spot, say 'goodbye' to limitations, conventions and step confident towards the future". During an interview with Wiwibloggs, the band stated that the song also discusses suicidal ideation and overcoming it. Benny Royston of Metro noticed "dark undertones of internal battles and breaking away from pain of depression". He compared the message to France, Italy and Israel's "theme[s] of public consciousness" captured in their entries for the Eurovision Song Contest 2018. "Goodbye" was made available for digital download on 12 January 2018 by Roton. A remix created by disc jockey Cristian Eberhard was also released in March 2018.

== Critical reception ==
Music critics gave generally negative reviews of "Goodbye" following its release. Irving Wolther of Eurovision.de found the song to be unspectacular and predicted Romania would not qualify for the Grand Final of the Eurovision Song Contest for the first time. Similar negative response was captured in the comments on the contest's social media after an announcement regarding The Humans' participation. In a Wiwibloggs review containing several reviews from individual critics, Caramarcu's vocal delivery and stage presence was praised, although it was noted that song lacked energy and was "flat", "cheesy" and "retro". Overall, the reviewers on the website gave the song 5.83 out of 10 points. In a later review from Wiwibloggs that included a higher number of reviewers, the song was given a score of 4.94 out of 10 points. In a poll conducted by Romanian news agency DC News, more than 65% of voters said that The Humans did not deserve to win the national selection. Lead singer Caramarcu stated during interviews that the amount of criticism received from the audience was minor. She further elaborated:

"With regard to [the negative feedback captured in] foreign press and all sorts of articles and polls made by Eurovision-specialized sites, I know it is not a hate to us. Each of us has the right to like or not like something. [For example, in a] more negative article from one of the most-watched Eurovision blogs, [the author] basically did not appreciate our song. I met the person who wrote the article in Israel and he was very sincere: 'It is not the music I am listening to and it is not what we like. You are very fine and we love you.' Thus, I was able to understand, and I can still understand, that you cannot please everyone. You cannot be angry at someone just because they say their point of view."

== Promotion ==
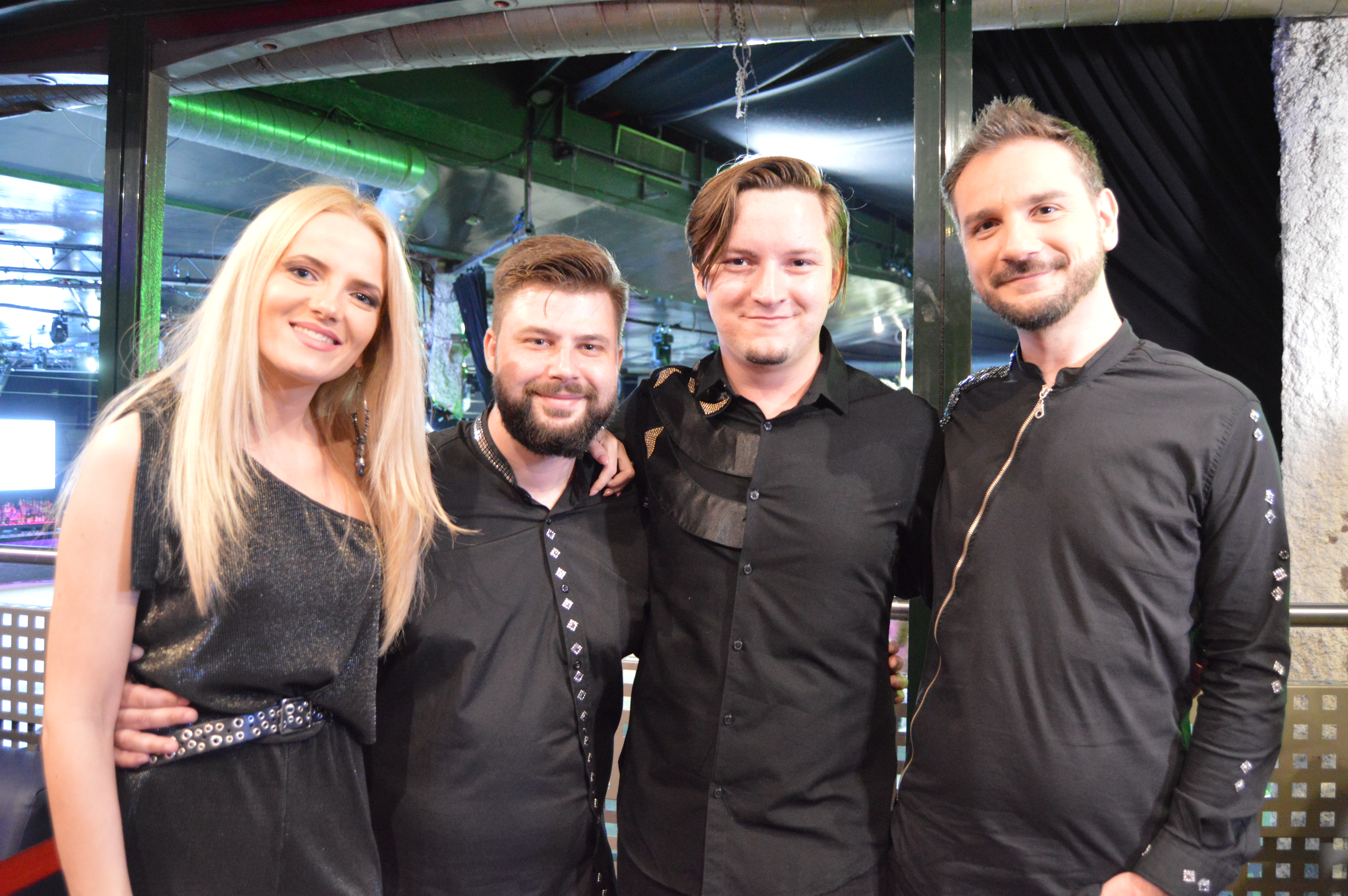
The Humans members (from left to right): Cristina Caramarcu, Alexandru Matei, Alexandru Cismaru and Alin Neagoe at a promotional event in Madrid, Spain.

An accompanying music video for "Goodbye" was uploaded simultaneously with the single's release on 12 January 2018 onto Roton's official YouTube channel. Directed by Anthony Icuagu, it features The Humans performing the song wearing black outfits. In interspersed shots, several people wear white masks, which the band said signifies that "in essence we are all the same, we are equal in the right to dream and aspire to the highest goals". For further promotion, The Humans appeared on various Romanian talk shows before and after their Selecția Națională win and commenced a tour in Europe. One destination was the ITB Berlin in Berlin, Germany, where promotional CDs of the song were handed. The band also had endeavours in Israel, Spain and Portugal. Regarding their tour, Caramarcu said in an interview with Adevărul:

"I was amazed [by the fact] that there are Eurovision fans who are very well-prepared and know about each of us. They are documented, look for pictures with us to give them autographs, sing our song and want to take pictures with us everywhere. This phenomenon is [great]. There is no trace of hate and negative energy [from] Eurovision fans and those who participate in the promotional endeavours."

== At Eurovision ==
=== National selection ===
The Romanian Television (TVR) opened a submission period for artists and composers to submit their entries between 15 November and 15 December 2017 to the Selecția Națională, during which 72 entries were received. All entrants got to participate in auditions on 19 and 20 December — which were broadcast in January 2018 on TVR1 — in front of a jury made up of five music industry professionals. 60 songs qualified for the five semi-finals — 12 for each semi-final — which took place throughout January and February 2018. The top three acts selected by the jury from each semi-final qualified for the final held on 25 February 2018, which encompassed 15 finalists. The winner was then determined by televoting. The Humans auditioned their song during the live audition round of the Selecția Națională, qualifying for the fifth and last semi-final on 18 February 2018. In the semi-final, they performed tenth and placed first with 58 points (with four jurors awarding them the maximum of 12 points), qualifying for the final. The group performed last in the final round on 25 February 2018; lead singer Caramarcu wore a red dress hand-sewed by Romanian designer Andreea Zamfir. The Humans ultimately won the Selecția Națională, gathering 3,277 audience votes.

=== In Lisbon ===
The Eurovision Song Contest 2018 took place at the Altice Arena in Lisbon, Portugal and consisted of two semi-finals on 8 and 10 May, and the final on 12 May 2018. According to Eurovision rules, each country, except the host country and the "Big 5" (France, Germany, Italy, Spain and the United Kingdom), is required to qualify from one of two semi-finals to compete for the final; the top ten countries from each semi-final progressed to the final. On 3 April 2018, it was announced that "Goodbye" would be performed second in the second semi-final of the contest, following Norway and preceding Serbia. Romania failed to qualify for the Grand Final for the first time in their participation history, making it one of their worst results ever.

==== Live performance and reception ====
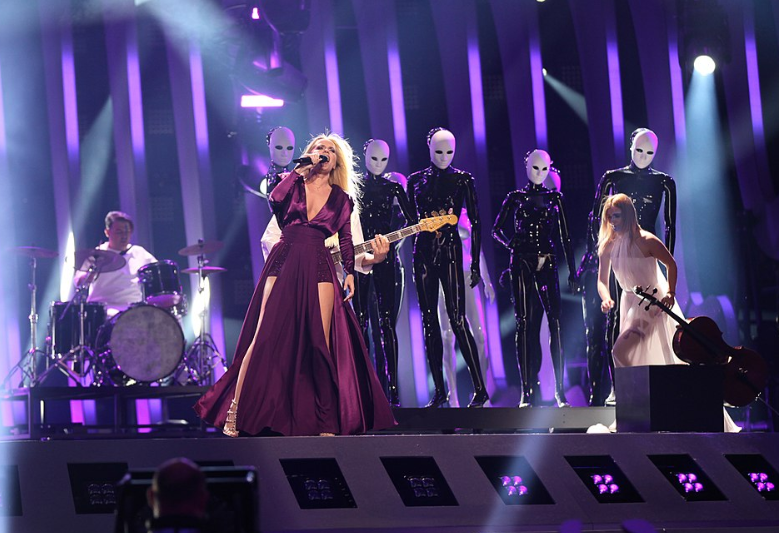
The Humans (pictured) performing during a rehearsal. Their performance featured several black and white, masked mannequins, representing the depersonalization and the loss of identity in modern society.

The Humans' Eurovision performance was directed by Petre Năstase, while Gabriel Scîrlet was hired as the music director. The outfits used were designed by Alexandra Calafeteanu. Năstase elaborated: "[The song will be accompanied by] elements that will give a certain depth to the show, as there is no background graphics on the stage in Lisbon. Everything is based on a play on lights, in a concept that will humanize our message." The Humans' rehearsals in Lisbon were scheduled to take place on 1 May and 4 May 2018; the group had previously prepared for the contest at Studiourile TVR in Bucharest, Romania.

The performance begins with cellist Matei removing a mask from her face; she wears a white dress and subsequently walks to the other end of the stage. Following this, Caramarcu is presented wearing a draping purple gown with a deep thigh-split on her left leg. Two band members perform choreography around her, both wearing white clothing along with masks on the back of their heads. Later in the show, Caramarcu wildly shakes her head and swishes her hair "all over the place" during the song's first refrain. After the singer walks on the stage — which is filled with a total of 25 masked male and female, black and white mannequins — she and the aforementioned members reach one of its ends to perform hand choreography in front of Matei. After playing the second refrain, The Humans' performance ends with Caramarcu standing in the middle of four bandmates. According to William Lee Adams of Wiwibloggs, the performance "remind[s] us of our humanity amid those who have no feelings. At times [Caramarcu's] band mates ... freeze and become 'mannequins' themselves, adding to the message that anyone can become frozen or indeed come back to life." The Humans further elaborated: "Our show includes masked mannequins, which reference depersonalization and the risk of losing identity in an increasingly fast and indifferent world that we are witnessing in everyday life. The concept emphasizes the song's message, which is hope and encouragement. We want to emphasize how important it is to stop, look around and enjoy life."

The Humans' performance was met with mostly positive reviews from music critics and viewers. An editor of EuroVisionary praised it, stating that the group "takes new technology to a whole new level not used before at Eurovision", while also applauding Caramarcu's vocal delivery and the band's overall stage presence. Jessica Weaver from ESC Today also praised the singer's vocals and wrote: "The Humans have produced a rather theatrical performance [...], with plenty of interpretive dance included throughout the entire song. Perhaps a performance which wasn’t expected from Romania for this entry". Weaver further commented that The Humans' show "is set to make a statement" and predicted it would "catch the viewers' eyes due to its differing style". Lee Adams, writing for Wiwibloggs, applauded the performance's creative and artistic nature, and stated that it "cuts across borders and touches hearts". He further noted the stage's dark lighting which "[take the viewer] to another world — a museum perhaps — and the visuals were so striking you didn't want to leave". In a more mixed review, an editor of Eurovision.de called the performance "rather disturbing", while likening the mannequins to those featured in the American science fiction action film I, Robot (2004). De Telegraaf's van de Crommert compared The Humans' show to a stadium concert, and the mannequins to "porn dolls with latex suits".

==== Points awarded to Romania ====
Below is a breakdown of points awarded to Romania in the contest's second semi-final, as well as the breakdown of the jury voting and televoting conducted during the show. Romania placed 11th with a total of 107 points, four behind tenth-placed and Grand Final-qualified Hungary. Romania received 40 televoting points, which consisted of 12 awarded by Italy and Moldova, and eight by France and Georgia. The jury points added to 67, including 12 from Hungary and Moldova, as well as eight from Montenegro.

Points awarded to Romania (Semi-Final 2)
Televote
12 points	10 points	8 points	7 points	6 points
Italy; Moldova		France; Georgia		
5 points	4 points	3 points	2 points	1 point
Jury
12 points	10 points	8 points	7 points	6 points
Hungary; Moldova		Montenegro		Slovenia; Georgia
5 points	4 points	3 points	2 points	1 point
	Russia	Sweden; Latvia; Poland	Netherlands; Norway; Malta; Ukraine	France; Serbia

== Track listing ==
Digital download
No.	Title	Length
1.	"Goodbye"	3:00

Digital download – Remix
No.	Title	Length
1.	"Goodbye" (Cristian Eberhard Remix)	3:13
2.	"Goodbye" (Cristian Eberhard Extended Remix)	4:47

== Release history ==
Territory	Date	Format(s)	Label
Worldwide	12 January 2018	Digital download	Roton
