= Cyprus in the Eurovision Song Contest 2018 =

- Eurovision Song Contest 2018
- Participating broadcaster: Cyprus Broadcasting Corporation (CyBC)
- Country: Cyprus
- Selection process: Internal selection
- Announcement date: 1 February 2018

Competing entry
- Song: "Fuego"
- Artist: Eleni Foureira
- Songwriters: Alex Papaconstantinou; Geraldo Sandell; Viktor Svensson; Anderz Wrethov; Didrick

Placement
- Semi-final result: Qualified (2nd, 262 points)
- Final result: 2nd, 436 points

Participation chronology

Cyprus was represented at the Eurovision Song Contest 2018 with the song "Fuego", written by Alex Papaconstantinou, Gerlado Sandell, Viktor Svensson, Anderz Wrethov and Didrick, and performed by Greek singer Eleni Foureira. The Cypriot participating broadcaster, Cyprus Broadcasting Corporation (CyBC), originally planned to select its entry through a televised national final with half the points being given by a televote and the other half a jury vote, but this aspect was discarded in January 2018 and it opted to choose its entry via an internal selection. Foureira was announced as the singer on 1 February, and her song "Fuego" and the accompanying music video premiered on the CyBC evening news bulletin on 2 March. Foureira travelled to Stockholm in mid-April to prepare for the competition by meeting and working with her dancers.

Cyprus was drawn to compete in the first semi-final of the Eurovision Song Contest, which took place on 8 May 2018. Performing as the closing entry of the show in position 19, "Fuego" was announced among the top 10 entries and therefore qualified to compete in the final on 12 May. It was later revealed that Cyprus placed second out of eighteen participating countries in the first semi-final with 262 points. In the final, Cyprus performed second-to-last in position twenty-five and received 436 points, finishing as runners-up to Israel in the island nation's best ever result of its Eurovision Song Contest history.

== Background ==
Prior to the 2018 contest, the Cyprus Broadcasting Corporation (CyBC) had participated in the Eurovision Song Contest representing Cyprus thirty-four times since its debut in the 1981 contest. Its best placing was fifth, achieved three times: in 1982 with the song "Mono i agapi" performed by Anna Vissi, in 1997 with "Mana mou" performed by Hara and Andreas Constantinou, and in 2004 with "Stronger Every Minute" performed by Lisa Andreas. Its least successful result was in 1986 when it placed last with the song "Tora zo" by Elpida, receiving only four points in total. Its worst finish in terms of points received, however, was in 1999 when it placed second to last with "Tha'nai erotas" by Marlain Angelidou, receiving only two points. After returning to the contest in 2015 following their one-year withdrawal from the 2014 edition due to the 2012–13 Cypriot financial crisis and the broadcaster's budget restrictions, it has managed to qualify for the final in all of the contests it has participated in.

As part of its duties as participating broadcaster, CyBC organises the selection of its entry in the Eurovision Song Contest and broadcasts the event in the country. The broadcaster confirmed its intentions to participate at the 2018 contest on 22 August 2017. CyBC has used various methods to select its entry in the past, such as internal selections and televised national finals to choose the performer, song or both to compete at Eurovision. In 2015, the broadcaster organised the national final Eurovision Song Project, which featured 54 songs competing in a nine-week-long process resulting in the selection of the Cypriot entry through the combination of public televoting and the votes from an expert jury. In 2018, CyBC had intended to broadcast a televised national final to select the artist and song before it was switched to an internal selection.

== Before Eurovision ==
=== Internal selection ===
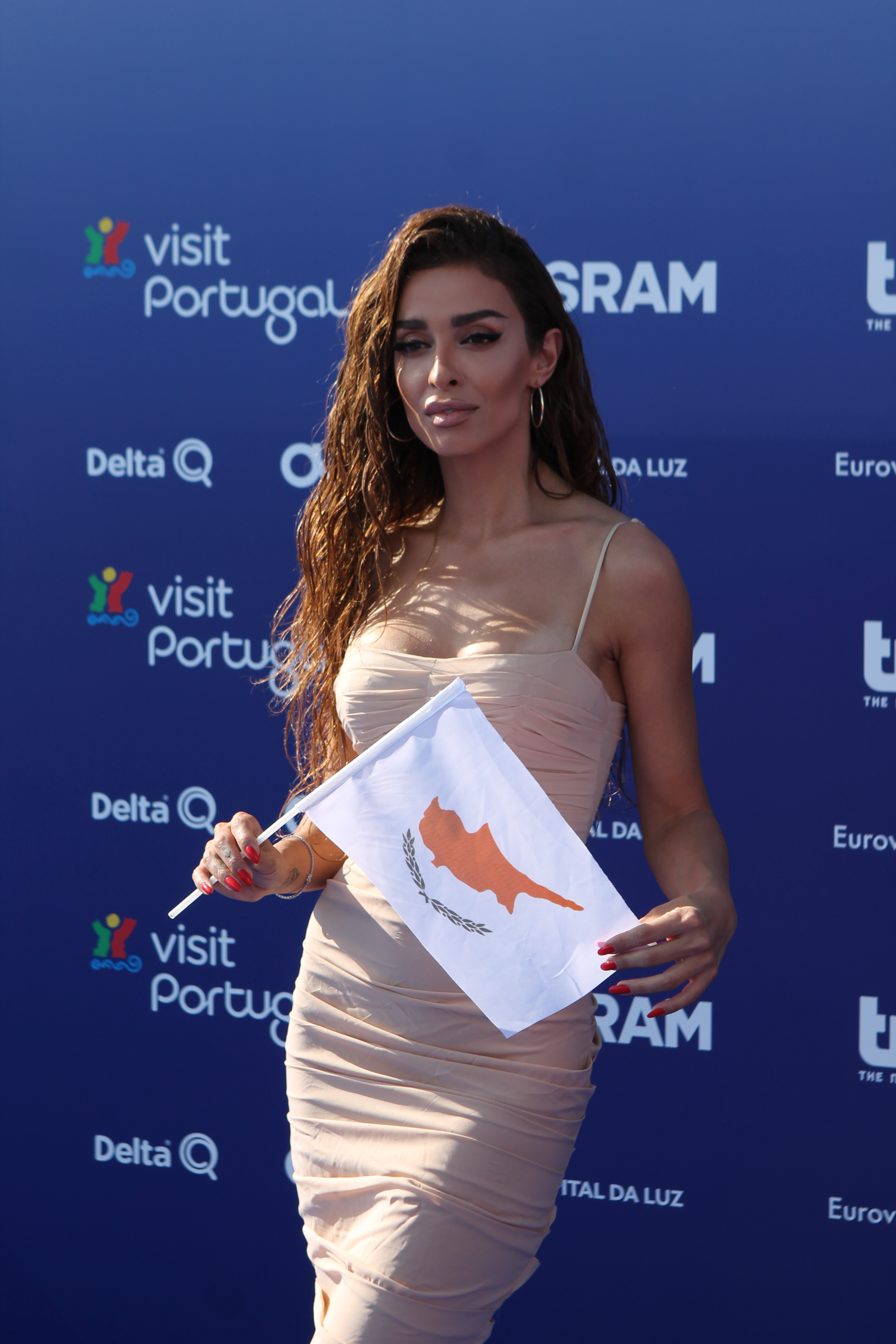
Eleni Foureira was internally selected by CyBC.

CyBC began to hold internal meetings to discuss the eligibility and rules of its national final to select the artist for the Eurovision Song Contest 2018 in June 2017. Three months later, a set of rules regarding the requirements of potential entrants was announced via a communiqué. The entry period was slated to end on 20 October. The artist had to be aged 16 or over at the time of eligibility and that the singer or either of their parents had to be in possession of Cypriot citizenship. Applicants who met CyBC requirements were planned to take part in a first selection phase and a round of televised auditions would occur for artists that progressed to the second phase. The winner of the final would be decided equally amongst a jury vote and televoting. CyBC employed Greek–Swedish composer and songwriter Alex Papaconstantinou to compose the Cypriot entry.

Auditions began on 23 November in front of the expert jury which was composed of choreographer Charis Savvas, Melodifestivalen producer and 1992 Swedish Eurovision entrant Christer Björkman and Papaconstantinou. By 19 December, the number of potential artists was lowered from 60 to 24. CyBC stopped the auditions in January 2018 and selected the artist and the song internally. One artist rumoured in the press to be the Cypriot representative in the contest was Helena Paparizou, who won Eurovision for Greece in 2005, who met with executives of the Hellenic Broadcasting Corporation (ERT) in Athens. She declined as she did not feel that participation was the best for her in that period of her life. Singer Tamta was also approached by ERT but she also declined because of prior commitments. CyBC subsequently announced to the media that the artist who would represent Cyprus in the Eurovision Song Contest would be revealed "in a few days".

On 1 February, Greek singer Eleni Foureira was confirmed as the Cypriot entrant for the 2018 contest by CyBC and would perform the song "Fuego". Foureira had attempted to enter Eurovision twice before, both times for Greece: in 2010 she came second in the national final with the song "Kivotos tou Noe", and in 2016 she approached ERT to perform "Ti koitas (Come Tiki Tam)" in Stockholm but ERT declined the offer. In a press conference after a short video about her was broadcast, she said she would promise to perform to the best of her ability in Lisbon, saying "I would like to say a big thank you to CyBC and all the Cypriot people, for giving me this opportunity. It is a great honour for me to represent this wonderful country which has supported me so much for all of these years."

=== Preparation ===
On 2 March, "Fuego" and its accompanying music video was premiered on CyBC's evening news bulletin. The video, directed by Apollon Papatheoharis, was filmed in February 2018 near the Piraeus Municipal Theatre in Piraeus and in the town of Marathon, and depicts Fouriera in various costumes taking "a visual and spiritual journey that shows off her versatility." Foureira flew to Lisbon on 14 March to film the Cypriot postcard that was broadcast before she performed on the Eurovision stage as a means of promoting the country. She is seen walking through the streets of Lisbon and arrives at the Ribeira Market to shop and cook local Portuguese cuisine with the chef Justa Nobre. Foureira later flew to the Swedish capital of Stockholm in mid-April and spent a week in the country acquainting herself with her troupe and rehearsing to make adjustments to her performance for the Eurovision Song Contest.

== At Eurovision ==
According to Eurovision rules, all nations except for the host country and the "Big Five" (France, Germany, Italy, Spain and the United Kingdom) are required to qualify from one of two semi-finals in order to compete for the final; the top ten countries from each semi-final progress to the final. The European Broadcasting Union (EBU) split up the competing countries into six different pots based on voting patterns from previous contests, with countries with favourable voting histories put into the same pot. On 29 January 2018, a special allocation draw was held in Lisbon City Hall, which placed each country into one of the two semi-finals, as well as which half of the show they would perform in. Cyprus was placed into the first semi-final to be held on 8 May, and was scheduled to perform in the second half of the show.

Once all the competing songs for the 2018 contest had been released, the running order for the semi-finals was decided by the shows' producers rather than through a second draw on 3 April, so that similar songs were not placed next to each other. Cyprus was set to perform in position 19, following the entry from Ireland.

The two semi-finals and the final were broadcast in Cyprus by public broadcasting service CyBC with commentary from Costas Constantinou and Vaso Komninou. CyBC appointed Hovig as its spokesperson to announce the top 12-point score awarded by the Cypriot jury during the final. According to the AGB Nielsen Media Research for viewership ratings, the first semi-final attracted 158,420 viewers watching live on 8 May, representing a market share of 35.9 per cent. The second semi-final was watched by 65,230 people and had an audience share of 25.4 per cent. The final on 12 May had a television audience 245,740 viewers, and achieved an audience share of 77.4 per cent in that time slot, setting a new record audience for any Eurovision broadcast in Cypriot history.

=== Semi-final ===
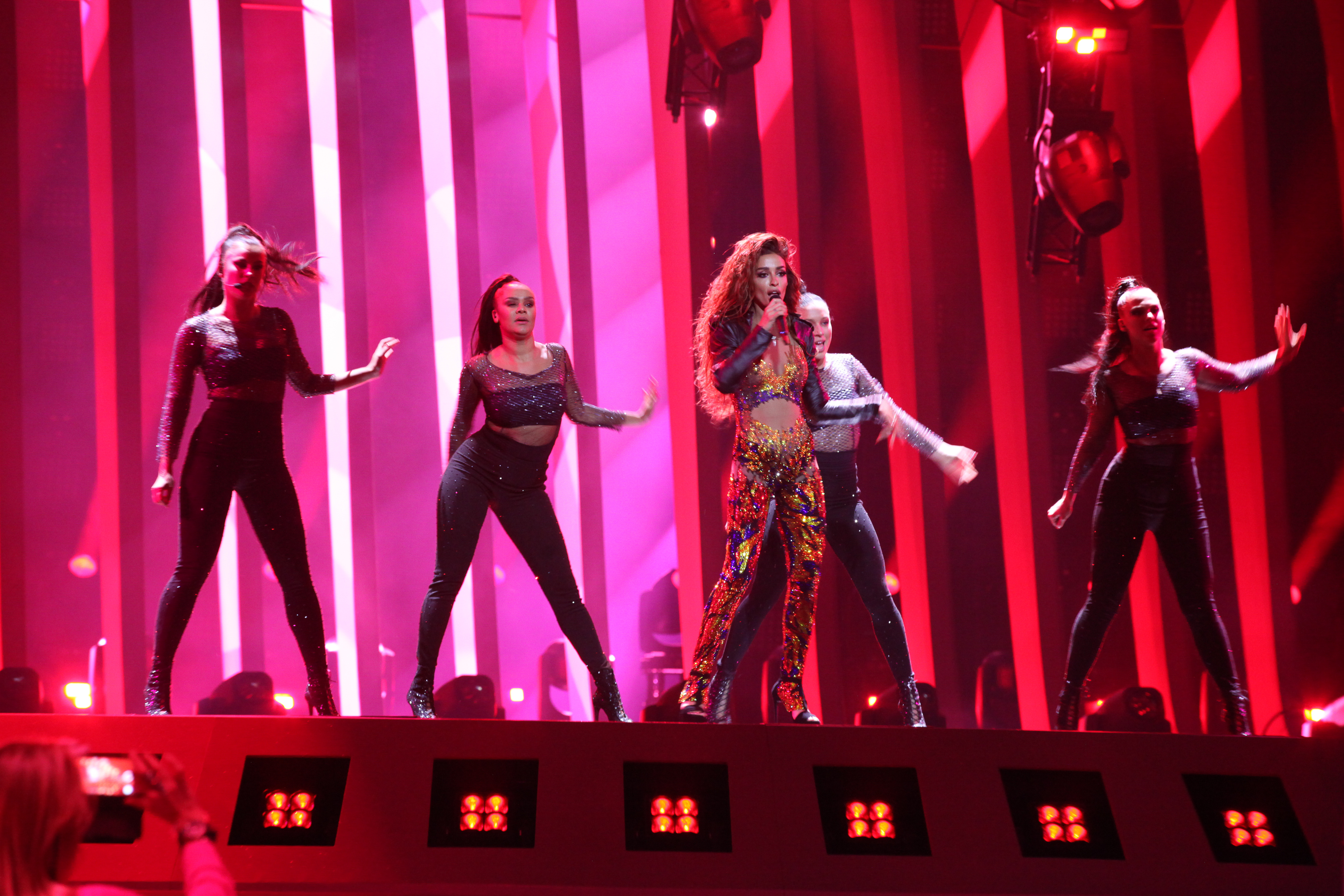
Eleni Foureira and her troupe during a rehearsal before the Grand Final on 12 May.

Foureira took part in a half-hour technical rehearsal on 30 April, followed by another rehearsal that lasted for 20 minutes on 4 May. She took part dress rehearsals for the first semi-final on 7 and 8 May. This included the jury show for the first semi-final on the evening of 7 May where the professional juries of each country watched and voted on the competing entries. On the day of the first semi-final, bookmakers considered Cyprus to be the most likely country to secure qualification to the final on 12 May.

The Cypriot performance featured Foureira in a glittery gold sequin catsuit, designed by Greek fashion designer Vrettos Vrettakos. She wore a black mini jacket with a transparent area around her stomach and golden high-heel boots. She was joined by four female backing dancers dressed in black and silver catsuits and transparent stiletto heels to ensure Foureira would be the primary focus.Two of the dancers also performed backing vocals. The performance began with the front and centre of Foureira's silhouette against a light tunnel illuminated blue by laser lights. After she walked through the tunnel and began performing the lights changed to red for the first verse of "Fuego", which was also when her backing dancers entered the choreography. The choreography included Foureira whipping around her hair, side stepping, hip swivelling, and catwalk strutting across the stage with her troupe. Sections of the second part of the show featured smoke in shades of purple, and fireballs emerging from the edge of the circular stage. Both of these were also digitally recreated on the large screen projector behind Foureira. The stage director of the Cypriot performance was choreographer Sacha Jean-Baptiste who had previously been involved in the Eurovision Song Contest since the 2016 edition.

At the end of the first semi-final, Cyprus was announced as having finished in the top 10 and subsequently qualifying for the grand final. It was later revealed that Cyprus had placed second in the first semi-final, receiving a total of 262 points, 173 points from the televoting and 89 points from the juries.

=== Final ===
Shortly after the first semi-final, a winners' press conference was held for the ten qualifying countries. As part of this press conference, the qualifying artists took part in a draw to determine which half of the grand final they would subsequently participate in. This draw was done in the order the countries appeared in the semi-final running order. Cyprus was drawn to compete in the second half. Following this draw, the shows' producers decided upon the running order of the final, as they had done for the semi-final. Cyprus was subsequently placed to perform in position 25, following the entry from Ireland and before the entry from Italy. On the day of the grand final, bookmakers considered Cyprus the favourites to win the Eurovision Song Contest for the first time in its history.

Foureira once again took part in dress rehearsals on 11 and 12 May before the final, including the jury final where the professional juries cast their final votes before the live show. Foureira performed a repeat of her semi-final performance during the final on 12 May. Cyprus took their best ever result in the Eurovision Song Contest as they placed as the runners-up in the final, scoring 436 points: 253 points from the televoting and 183 points from the juries, including twelve points from the juries of Belarus, Greece, Ireland, Malta, Spain, and Sweden.

=== Marcel Bezençon Awards ===
The Marcel Bezençon Awards, first awarded during the 2002 contest, are awards honouring the best competing songs in the final each year. Named after the creator of the annual contest, Marcel Bezençon, the awards are divided into 3 categories: the Press Award, given to the best entry as voted on by the accredited media and press during the event; the Artistic Award, presented to the best artist as voted on by the shows' commentators; and the Composer Award, given to the best and most original composition as voted by the participating composers. Foureira was awarded the Artistic Award, which was accepted at the awards ceremony by the singer.

=== Voting ===
Every country voted to award two sets of points from 1–8, 10 and 12 in the three shows: one from their professional jury and the other from televoting. Each nation's jury consisted of five music industry professionals who are citizens of the country they represent, with their names published before the contest to ensure transparency. The individual rankings of each jury member and the nation's televoting results were released shortly after the grand final.

Below is a breakdown of points awarded to Cyprus and awarded by the island nation in the first semi-final and grand final of the contest, and of the jury voting and televoting conducted during the two shows. Cyprus' televoters and jury awarded 12 points to Greece and Israel respectively in the first semi-final. In the final, the televoters awarded 12 points to Bulgaria and the jury gave their 12 points to Sweden.

==== Points awarded to Cyprus ====
Points awarded to Cyprus (Semi-final 1)
| Score | Televote | Jury |
|---|---|---|
| 12 points | Albania; Armenia; Bulgaria; Croatia; Greece | Albania; Ireland |
| 10 points | Israel; Portugal; Spain | Armenia; Spain |
| 8 points | United Kingdom | Azerbaijan; Estonia |
| 7 points | Austria; Azerbaijan; Belarus; Belgium; Czech Republic; Ireland; Macedonia; Switzerland | Finland; Greece |
| 6 points | | |
| 5 points | Finland; Iceland; Lithuania | |
| 4 points | Estonia | Switzerland |
| 3 points | | Belgium; Bulgaria; Macedonia |
| 2 points | | Croatia |
| 1 point | | |

Points awarded to Cyprus (Final)
| Score | Televote | Jury |
|---|---|---|
| 12 points | Armenia; Bulgaria; Greece | Belarus; Greece; Ireland; Malta; Spain; Sweden |
| 10 points | Albania; Azerbaijan; Georgia; Malta; Serbia | Albania; Macedonia |
| 8 points | Croatia; Czech Republic; Macedonia; Poland; Spain; United Kingdom | Estonia; Slovenia |
| 7 points | Australia; Belgium; Hungary; Moldova; Romania; San Marino | Armenia; Russia; Switzerland |
| 6 points | Germany; Lithuania; Slovenia | Finland; Moldova; Netherlands |
| 5 points | Ireland; Italy; Montenegro; Netherlands; Portugal | Denmark; Norway; Romania |
| 4 points | Estonia; Russia; Sweden; Ukraine | Azerbaijan; Belgium |
| 3 points | Belarus; France; Switzerland | Bulgaria; Germany; Italy |
| 2 points | Israel; Norway | Iceland |
| 1 point | Austria; Denmark; Finland; Iceland; Latvia | Lithuania; Montenegro |

==== Points awarded by Cyprus ====
Points awarded by Cyprus (Semi-final 1)
| Score | Televote | Jury |
|---|---|---|
| 12 points | Greece | Israel |
| 10 points | Bulgaria | Azerbaijan |
| 8 points | Israel | Greece |
| 7 points | Czech Republic | Albania |
| 6 points | Estonia | Bulgaria |
| 5 points | Belarus | Estonia |
| 4 points | Armenia | Croatia |
| 3 points | Lithuania | Austria |
| 2 points | Ireland | Finland |
| 1 point | Austria | Czech Republic |

Points awarded by Cyprus (Final)
| Score | Televote | Jury |
|---|---|---|
| 12 points | Bulgaria | Sweden |
| 10 points | Israel | Moldova |
| 8 points | Czech Republic | Italy |
| 7 points | Italy | Spain |
| 6 points | Lithuania | Albania |
| 5 points | Norway | Czech Republic |
| 4 points | Estonia | Hungary |
| 3 points | Germany | France |
| 2 points | Ukraine | Austria |
| 1 point | France | Estonia |

==== Detailed voting results ====
The following five members composed the Cypriot jury: Jury members were required to rank every song in the respective shows; the combined score were added to determine the jury's final result.

- Elias Antoniades (jury chairperson) – lyricist, general manager in advertising agency
- Ioannis Hadjigeorgiou (Yiannis) – journalist, editor, editor in chief
- Kalliopi Kouroupi – radio producer, account executive in advertising
- Demetra Georgiou – radio producer, journalist
- Pavlos Palechorites – musician, music teacher, producer

Detailed voting results from Cyprus (Semi-final 1)
| R/O | Country | Jury | | | | | | | Televote | |
| R/O | Country | E. Antoniades | Yiannis | K. Kouroupi | D. Georgiou | P. Palechorites | Rank | Points | Rank | Points |
|---|---|---|---|---|---|---|---|---|---|---|
| 01 | Azerbaijan | 4 | 2 | 3 | 1 | 2 | 2 | 10 | 15 | |
| 02 | Iceland | 17 | 18 | 15 | 11 | 11 | 17 | | 18 | |
| 03 | Albania | 6 | 5 | 5 | 3 | 4 | 4 | 7 | 14 | |
| 04 | Belgium | 12 | 17 | 18 | 9 | 16 | 16 | | 13 | |
| 05 | Czech Republic | 7 | 8 | 11 | 8 | 12 | 10 | 1 | 4 | 7 |
| 06 | Lithuania | 13 | 6 | 12 | 10 | 18 | 13 | | 8 | 3 |
| 07 | Israel | 1 | 4 | 1 | 2 | 3 | 1 | 12 | 3 | 8 |
| 08 | Belarus | 14 | 13 | 9 | 16 | 7 | 15 | | 6 | 5 |
| 09 | Estonia | 9 | 15 | 14 | 13 | 1 | 6 | 5 | 5 | 6 |
| 10 | Bulgaria | 3 | 7 | 6 | 4 | 5 | 5 | 6 | 2 | 10 |
| 11 | Macedonia | 10 | 11 | 13 | 7 | 8 | 12 | | 17 | |
| 12 | Croatia | 8 | 9 | 8 | 6 | 9 | 7 | 4 | 16 | |
| 13 | Austria | 2 | 16 | 10 | 14 | 13 | 8 | 3 | 10 | 1 |
| 14 | Greece | 5 | 1 | 4 | 5 | 6 | 3 | 8 | 1 | 12 |
| 15 | Finland | 15 | 10 | 2 | 15 | 17 | 9 | 2 | 12 | |
| 16 | Armenia | 18 | 14 | 17 | 18 | 15 | 18 | | 7 | 4 |
| 17 | Switzerland | 16 | 3 | 16 | 17 | 10 | 11 | | 11 | |
| 18 | Ireland | 11 | 12 | 7 | 12 | 14 | 14 | | 9 | 2 |
| 19 | Cyprus | | | | | | | | | |

Detailed voting results from Cyprus (Final)
| R/O | Country | Jury | | | | | | | Televote | |
| R/O | Country | E. Antoniades | Yiannis | K. Kouroupi | D. Georgiou | P. Palechorites | Rank | Points | Rank | Points |
|---|---|---|---|---|---|---|---|---|---|---|
| 01 | Ukraine | 17 | 22 | 18 | 22 | 17 | 19 | | 9 | 2 |
| 02 | Spain | 2 | 8 | 9 | 2 | 6 | 4 | 7 | 21 | |
| 03 | Slovenia | 21 | 21 | 20 | 24 | 24 | 24 | | 25 | |
| 04 | Lithuania | 15 | 14 | 12 | 10 | 10 | 16 | | 5 | 6 |
| 05 | Austria | 8 | 10 | 7 | 7 | 11 | 9 | 2 | 11 | |
| 06 | Estonia | 11 | 12 | 13 | 4 | 9 | 10 | 1 | 7 | 4 |
| 07 | Norway | 16 | 5 | 17 | 14 | 21 | 15 | | 6 | 5 |
| 08 | Portugal | 23 | 23 | 21 | 18 | 16 | 20 | | 24 | |
| 09 | United Kingdom | 24 | 16 | 24 | 21 | 18 | 21 | | 15 | |
| 10 | Serbia | 22 | 17 | 25 | 23 | 25 | 23 | | 12 | |
| 11 | Germany | 20 | 19 | 22 | 19 | 20 | 22 | | 8 | 3 |
| 12 | Albania | 5 | 6 | 5 | 5 | 5 | 5 | 6 | 17 | |
| 13 | France | 7 | 13 | 11 | 12 | 4 | 8 | 3 | 10 | 1 |
| 14 | Czech Republic | 4 | 9 | 8 | 6 | 8 | 6 | 5 | 3 | 8 |
| 15 | Denmark | 25 | 24 | 23 | 25 | 22 | 25 | | 19 | |
| 16 | Australia | 18 | 4 | 16 | 20 | 14 | 14 | | 23 | |
| 17 | Finland | 13 | 15 | 14 | 16 | 13 | 17 | | 22 | |
| 18 | Bulgaria | 12 | 18 | 15 | 13 | 15 | 18 | | 1 | 12 |
| 19 | Moldova | 3 | 3 | 4 | 3 | 3 | 2 | 10 | 13 | |
| 20 | Sweden | 1 | 1 | 1 | 9 | 1 | 1 | 12 | 18 | |
| 21 | Hungary | 14 | 2 | 6 | 17 | 23 | 7 | 4 | 20 | |
| 22 | Israel | 9 | 7 | 10 | 8 | 12 | 12 | | 2 | 10 |
| 23 | Netherlands | 19 | 25 | 19 | 11 | 2 | 13 | | 16 | |
| 24 | Ireland | 10 | 20 | 2 | 15 | 19 | 11 | | 14 | |
| 25 | Cyprus | | | | | | | | | |
| 26 | Italy | 6 | 11 | 3 | 1 | 7 | 3 | 8 | 4 | 7 |
