= Spain in the Eurovision Song Contest 2018 =

- Eurovision Song Contest 2018
- Participating broadcaster: Radiotelevisión Española (RTVE)
- Country: Spain
- Selection process: Operación Triunfo 2017: Gala Eurovisión
- Selection date: 29 January 2018

Competing entry
- Song: "Tu canción"
- Artist: Amaia and Alfred
- Songwriters: Raúl Gómez; Sylvia Santoro

Placement
- Final result: 23rd, 61 points

Participation chronology

Spain was represented at the Eurovision Song Contest 2018 with the song "Tu canción", written by Raúl Gómez and Sylvia Santoro, and performed by Amaia and Alfred. The Spanish participating broadcaster, Radiotelevisión Española (RTVE), selected its entry through the ninth series of the reality television music competition Operación Triunfo. Eight acts ultimately qualified to compete in the Eurovision selection show of the competition where a public vote exclusively selected "Tu canción" performed by Amaia and Alfred as the winner, receiving 43% of the votes.

As a member of the "Big Five", Spain automatically qualified to compete in the final of the Eurovision Song Contest. Performing in position 2, Spain placed twenty-third out of the 26 participating countries with 61 points.

== Background ==
Prior to the 2018 contest, Televisión Española (TVE) until 2006, and Radiotelevisión Española (RTVE) since 2007, had participated in the Eurovision Song Contest representing Spain fifty-seven times since TVE's first entry in 1961. They have won the contest on two occasions: in 1968 with the song "La, la, la" performed by Massiel and in 1969 with the song "Vivo cantando" performed by Salomé, the latter having won in a four-way tie with France, the Netherlands, and the United Kingdom. They have also finished second four times, with "En un mundo nuevo" by Karina in 1971, "Eres tú" by Mocedades in 1973, "Su canción" by Betty Missiego in 1979, and "Vuelve conmigo" by Anabel Conde in 1995. In 2017, RTVE placed twenty-sixth and last with the song "Do It for Your Lover" performed by Manel Navarro.

As part of its duties as participating broadcaster, RTVE organises the selection of its entry in the Eurovision Song Contest and broadcasts the event in the country. RTVE confirmed its intentions to participate at the 2018 contest on 1 September 2017. In 2016 and 2017, RTVE organised a national final featuring a competition among several artists and songs to select both the artist and song. On 4 December 2017, the broadcaster announced that it would use the ongoing ninth series of the reality television singing competition Operación Triunfo, which returned to TVE after 13 years, to select their 2018 entry; the same selection method was used between 2002 and 2004.

== Before Eurovision ==
=== Operación Triunfo 2017 ===
The Spanish entry for the Eurovision Song Contest 2018 was selected through Operación Triunfo, a Spanish reality television music competition consisting of training sixteen contestants in a boarding academy in order to find new singing talent. The ninth series, also known as Operación Triunfo 2017, took place from 23 October 2017 to 5 February 2018 at the Parc Audiovisual de Catalunya in Terrassa (Barcelona), hosted by Roberto Leal. The competition was broadcast on La 1 and TVE International as well as online via RTVE's official website rtve.es. The top five contestants (Aitana, Alfred, Amaia, Ana Guerra and Miriam) qualified to compete in the Eurovision selection show, Gala Eurovisión, that took place on 29 January 2018. It was later announced that the contestant placed sixth (Agoney) would also compete in Gala Eurovisión.

Nearly 200 songs were submitted for Gala Eurovisión by music publishers as well as independent and established artists and songwriters invited by RTVE. The teaching staff of the academy as well as professionals at RTVE and the production company Gestmusic evaluated the songs received and selected nine songs, which were then allocated by the academy teachers to the six competing contestants. The top five classified contestants were each allocated a solo song, while three songs were allocated to duet combinations and the remaining song, a three-minute version of the Operación Triunfo 2017 theme song "Camina", was performed by the top five classified contestants as a group. The competing songs and the allocations were announced on 23 January 2018. Prior to Gala Eurovisión, the competing songwriters together with the academy teachers coached the contestants in order to prepare their performances.

Contestant qualified to "Gala Eurovisión"

Contestant	Age	Residence	Episode of elimination	Place finished (Overall ranking)
Amaia	19	Pamplona	Gala Final	1st
Aitana	18	Barcelona	Gala Final	2nd
Miriam	21	A Coruña	Gala Final	3rd
Alfred	20	Barcelona	Gala Final	4th
Ana Guerra	23	Tenerife	Gala Final	5th
Agoney	21	Tenerife	Gala 12	6th
Roi	23	Santiago de Compostela	Gala 11	7th
Nerea	18	Barcelona	Gala 10	8th
Cepeda	28	Ourense	Gala 9	9th
Raoul	20	Barcelona	Gala 8	10th
Mireya	20	Málaga	Gala 7	11th
Ricky	31	Palma	Gala 6	12th
Marina	19	Seville	Gala 5	13th
Thalía	18	Cáceres	Gala 4	14th
Juan Antonio	23	Bilbao	Gala 3	15th
Mimi	25	Granada	Gala 2	16th
Joao	21	Madrid	Gala 0	Not selected
Mario	21	Madrid	Gala 0	Not selected

==== Gala Eurovisión ====
Gala Eurovisión took place on 29 January 2018. The winner was selected over two rounds of public voting via telephone, SMS and the official Operación Triunfo app. In the first round, the top three entries qualified for the second round. In the second round, the winner, "Tu canción" performed by Alfred and Amaia was selected.

The four members of the expert panel that commented on the entries were:

- Víctor Escudero – Editor at the official Eurovision Song Contest site eurovision.tv
- Luísa Sobral – Portuguese singer, songwriter, Eurovision winning songwriter for Portugal in 2017
- Julia Varela – Journalist at RTVE, commentator of the Eurovision Song Contest
- Manuel Martos – Musician, music executive and artistic director at Universal Music Spain

In addition to the performances of the competing entries, guest performers included Luísa Sobral performing "Cupido", Conchita Wurst, who won Eurovision for Austria in 2014, performing "Rise Like a Phoenix", J Balvin performing a medley of "Machika" and "Mi Gente", and the eliminated contestants of Operación Triunfo 2017 performing the Eurovision winning songs "La, la, la" (Spain 1968) and "Vivo cantando" (Spain 1969). Manel Navarro who represented Spain in 2017 was also present to announce the winner. Gala Eurovisión was watched by 3.086 million viewers in Spain with a market share of 23.6%, making it the most watched Spanish national final since 2004.

First Round – 29 January 2018
R/O	Artist	Song	Songwriter(s)	Televote	Place
1	Aitana, Alfred, Amaia, Ana Guerra and Miriam	"Camina"	Operación Triunfo 2017 contestants; Manu Guix	1%	9
2	Aitana	"Arde"	Alba Reig; María Peláe	—N/a	2–3
3	Agoney and Miriam	"Magia"	David Otero; Diego Cantero; Tato Latorre	7%	5
4	Alfred	"Que nos sigan las luces"	Nil Moliner	3%	8
5	Aitana and Ana Guerra	"Lo malo"	Jess Morgan; Will Simms; Brisa Fenoy	—N/a	2–3
6	Amaia	"Al cantar"	Rozalén	4%	7
7	Miriam	"Lejos de tu piel"	Steve Robson; Ina Wroldsen; Diego Cantero	8%	4
8	Ana Guerra	"El remedio"	Nabález	5%	6
9	Alfred and Amaia	"Tu canción"	Raúl Gómez; Sylvia Santoro	—N/a	1

Second Round – 29 January 2018
R/O	Artist	Song	Televote	Place
1	Aitana	"Arde"	31%	2
2	Alfred and Amaia	"Tu canción"	43%	1
3	Aitana and Ana Guerra	"Lo malo"	26%	3

=== Preparation ===
The official video of the song, directed by Gus Carballo, was filmed in February 2018 at studio in Madrid. The video premiered on 9 March 2018 on a special prime time broadcast on La 1, hosted by Roberto Leal. The music video served as the official preview video for the Spanish entry.

=== Promotion ===
Amaia y Alfred made appearances across Europe to specifically promote "Tu canción" as the Spanish Eurovision entry. On 5 April, they performed during the London Eurovision Party, which was held at the Café de Paris venue in London, United Kingdom. They also performed during the Israel Calling event which was held at Rabin Square in Tel Aviv, Israel on 10 April. On 14 April, Amaia y Alfred performed during the Eurovision in Concert event which was held at the AFAS Live venue in Amsterdam, Netherlands.

In addition to their international appearances, on 26 February, Amaia y Alfred performed an acoustic version of the song on talk show El Hormiguero on Antena 3, where they were guest interviewed. On 11 March, they performed the acoustic version on talk show Viva la vida on Telecinco, where they were likewise guest interviewed. On 15 March, they performed the song on the Premios Dial awards show at the Auditorio de Tenerife in Santa Cruz, aired live on Divinity. On 24 March, they performed the song on the La noche de Cadena 100 charity concert at the WiZink Center in Madrid, aired live on Divinity. On 25 March, they performed as guests on competitive dance reality television series Fama, a bailar, aired on #0. On 21 April, they performed during the Eurovision-Spain Pre-Party event which was held at the Sala La Riviera venue in Madrid. On 26 April, the special live concert event Amaia, Alfred y amigos, which aired on RTVE's official website and the web platform Playz, centered on them, accompanied by guest performers Zahara and Love of Lesbian, among others. During the concert, Amaia y Alfred performed "Your Song", an English version of their entry.

== At Eurovision ==
The Eurovision Song Contest 2018 took place at the Altice Arena in Lisbon, Portugal and consisted of two semi-finals on 8 and 10 May and the final on 12 May 2018. According to Eurovision rules, all nations with the exceptions of the host country and the "Big Five" (France, Germany, Italy, Spain and the United Kingdom) are required to qualify from one of two semi-finals in order to compete for the final; the top ten countries from each semi-final progress to the final. As a member of the "Big Five", Spain automatically qualifies to compete in the final. In addition to their participation in the final, Spain is also required to broadcast and vote in one of the two semi-finals. At the semi-final allocation draw on 29 January 2018, Spain was drawn to vote in the first semi-final on 8 May; the country also performed in the first semi-final jury show on 7 May, and an extended clip of the performance was broadcast in the televised semi-final show the following evening.

In Spain, both semi-finals were broadcast on La 2, while the final was televised on La 1 with commentary by Tony Aguilar and Julia Varela. RTVE appointed Nieves Álvarez as its spokesperson to announce during the final the top 12-point score awarded by the Spanish jury, for the second year in a row. For the first time, the final of the Eurovision Song Contest was broadcast live in cinemas across the country due to an agreement with cinema chain Cinesa. The Spanish song placed 23rd in the final with 61 points.

=== Staging and performance ===
The staging director for the Spanish performance was Tinet Rubira, and Jordi Vives was the multi-camera director.

=== Voting ===
==== Points awarded to Spain ====
Points awarded to Spain (Final)
Score	Televote	Jury
12 points	Portugal	
10 points		Romania
8 points		
7 points		Australia; Cyprus
6 points		Denmark; Germany
5 points	France	
4 points		
3 points		
2 points		Norway; Portugal
1 point	Switzerland	Belgium; Ireland; United Kingdom

==== Points awarded by Spain ====
Points awarded by Spain (Semi-final 1)
Score	Televote	Jury
12 points	Ireland	Israel
10 points	Cyprus	Cyprus
8 points	Bulgaria	Austria
7 points	Israel	Czech Republic
6 points	Finland	Estonia
5 points	Albania	Switzerland
4 points	Czech Republic	Albania
3 points	Lithuania	Bulgaria
2 points	Estonia	Ireland
1 point	Switzerland	Finland

Points awarded by Spain (Final)
Score	Televote	Jury
12 points	Israel	Cyprus
10 points	Czech Republic	Israel
8 points	Cyprus	Austria
7 points	Italy	Germany
6 points	Germany	France
5 points	Bulgaria	Ireland
4 points	France	Czech Republic
3 points	Norway	Italy
2 points	Estonia	Sweden
1 point	Ireland	Estonia

==== Detailed voting results ====
The following members comprised the Spanish jury:

- Rafael Cano Guisado (Rafa Cano; jury chairperson) – radio presenter, radio DJ
- Carmen Brisa Fenoy Núñez (Brisa Fenoy) – singer, composer, music producer
- Miriam Rodríguez Gallego (Miriam) – artist, singer, guitar player
- Roi Méndez Martínez (Roi) – singer
- Concepción Mendívil Feito (Conchita) – singer, composer, songwriter

Detailed voting results from Spain (Semi-final 1)
R/O	Country	Jury							Televote	
R/O	Country	R. Cano	B. Fenoy	Miriam	Roi	Conchita	Rank	Points	Rank	Points
01	Azerbaijan	8	18	13	17	12	13		17	
02	Iceland	16	13	18	18	19	18		15	
03	Albania	10	12	4	4	4	7	4	6	5
04	Belgium	9	10	14	16	13	12		13	
05	Czech Republic	3	5	9	5	5	4	7	7	4
06	Lithuania	17	9	15	14	14	14		8	3
07	Israel	2	1	2	1	2	1	12	4	7
08	Belarus	12	11	19	15	16	16		16	
09	Estonia	4	15	6	3	6	5	6	9	2
10	Bulgaria	14	3	8	12	8	8	3	3	8
11	Macedonia	13	16	16	13	17	17		18	
12	Croatia	7	14	12	11	11	11		19	
13	Austria	5	4	3	2	3	3	8	11	
14	Greece	18	19	17	19	18	19		12	
15	Finland	6	8	10	9	10	10	1	5	6
16	Armenia	19	17	11	10	15	15		14	
17	Switzerland	15	2	5	7	7	6	5	10	1
18	Ireland	11	6	7	8	9	9	2	1	12
19	Cyprus	1	7	1	6	1	2	10	2	10

Detailed voting results from Spain (Final)
R/O	Country	Jury							Televote	
R/O	Country	R. Cano	B. Fenoy	Miriam	Roi	Conchita	Rank	Points	Rank	Points
01	Ukraine	22	13	19	19	21	21		16	
02	Spain									
03	Slovenia	20	6	17	23	19	17		24	
04	Lithuania	16	21	11	15	17	19		14	
05	Austria	5	12	2	5	2	3	8	15	
06	Estonia	8	19	6	12	7	10	1	9	2
07	Norway	3	11	16	16	11	11		8	3
08	Portugal	24	4	13	17	22	15		13	
09	United Kingdom	9	16	9	14	15	16		21	
10	Serbia	25	17	23	24	25	23		25	
11	Germany	10	5	5	3	4	4	7	5	6
12	Albania	19	18	7	7	10	12		23	
13	France	11	1	14	8	6	5	6	7	4
14	Czech Republic	4	9	12	6	13	7	4	2	10
15	Denmark	23	24	24	18	23	24		17	
16	Australia	6	23	15	13	9	14		22	
17	Finland	12	20	20	21	18	20		20	
18	Bulgaria	18	10	22	20	14	18		6	5
19	Moldova	13	22	21	22	20	22		12	
20	Sweden	7	8	8	10	12	9	2	11	
21	Hungary	21	25	25	25	24	25		18	
22	Israel	2	2	3	1	5	2	10	1	12
23	Netherlands	17	14	18	4	16	13		19	
24	Ireland	14	7	4	9	8	6	5	10	1
25	Cyprus	1	3	1	2	1	1	12	3	8
26	Italy	15	15	10	11	3	8	3	4	7
