= The Humans (Romanian band) =

Romanian band

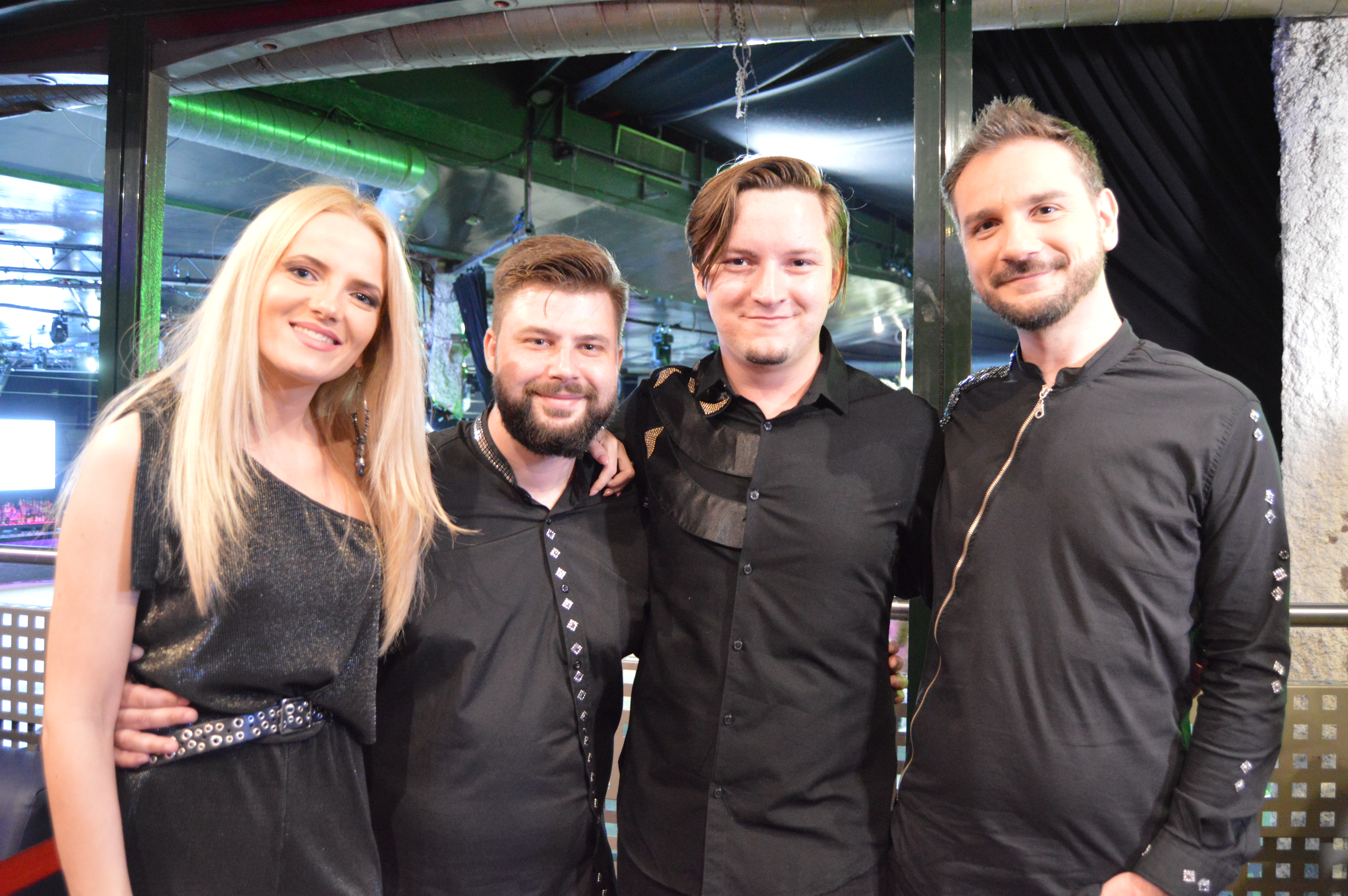

Background information
- Origin: Bucharest, Romania
- Genres: Pop rock; rock; funk
- Years active: 2017–present
- Members: Cristina Caramarcu (born 22 February 1988); Alexandru Cismaru; Alexandru Matei; Alin Neagoe; Adi Tetrade; Adrian Tanase; Corina Matei

The Humans is a Romanian band from Bucharest. The group consists of vocalist Cristina Caramarcu, guitarist Alexandru Cismaru, keyboardist Alexandru Matei, bassist Alin Neagoe, and drummer Adi Tetrade. They represented Romania in the Eurovision Song Contest 2018 in Lisbon, Portugal, with the song "Goodbye".

The lead female singer from the band, Cristina Vasilache Caramarcu was chosen by Walt Disney Pictures to provide the singing voice of Miss Atlantis and to sing the song "Baby Mine" in the live-action movie Dumbo.

== Discography ==
=== Singles ===
Title	Year	Album
"Îndură inima"	2017	Non-album singles
"Goodbye"	2018	Non-album singles
"Binele meu"	2018	Non-album singles

== Band members ==
- Cristina Caramarcu-Lead vocals
- Alexandru Cismaru-Lead guitar, backing vocals
- Alexandru Matei-Keyboard, backing vocals
- Alin Neagoe-bass, backing vocals
- Adrian Tanase-Guitar, vocals
- Pedro Adi Tetrade-Drums, percussion

Supporting/additional members:

- Corina Matei-Cello, violin, backing vocals

Preceded by Ilinca & Alex Florea with "Yodel It!"	Romania in the Eurovision Song Contest; 2018	Succeeded by Ester Peony with "On a Sunday"
