= United Kingdom in the Eurovision Song Contest 2018 =

- Eurovision Song Contest 2018
- Participating broadcaster: British Broadcasting Corporation (BBC)
- Country: United Kingdom
- Selection process: Eurovision: You Decide
- Selection date: 7 February 2018

Competing entry
- Song: "Storm"
- Artist: SuRie
- Songwriters: Nicole Blair; Gil Lewis; Sean Hargreaves

Placement
- Final result: 24th, 48 points

Participation chronology

The United Kingdom was represented at the Eurovision Song Contest 2018 with the song "Storm", written by Nicole Blair, Gil Lewis, and Sean Hargreaves, and performed by SuRie. The British participating broadcaster, the British Broadcasting Corporation (BBC), selected its entry in the contest via the national final Eurovision: You Decide. Six acts competed in the national final and the winner was selected through the combination of a public vote and the votes of an eight-member professional jury.

As a member of the "Big Five", the United Kingdom automatically qualified to compete in the final of the Eurovision Song Contest. Performing in position 9, the United Kingdom placed 24th out of the 26 participating countries with 48 points.

== Background ==
Prior to the 2018 contest, the British Broadcasting Corporation (BBC) had participated in the Eurovision Song Contest representing the United Kingdom sixty times. Thus far, it has won the contest five times: in 1967 with the song "Puppet on a String" performed by Sandie Shaw, in 1969 with the song "Boom Bang-a-Bang" performed by Lulu, in 1976 with the song "Save Your Kisses for Me" performed by Brotherhood of Man, in 1981 with the song "Making Your Mind Up" performed by Bucks Fizz, and in 1997 with the song "Love Shine a Light" performed by Katrina and the Waves. To this point, the nation is noted for having finished as the runner-up in a record fifteen contests. Up to and including 1998, the UK had only twice finished outside the top 10, in 1978 and 1987. Since 1999, the year in which the rule was abandoned that songs must be performed in one of the official languages of the country participating, the UK has had less success, thus far only finishing within the top ten twice: in 2002 with the song "Come Back" performed by Jessica Garlick and in 2009 with the song "It's My Time" performed by Jade Ewen. For the 2017 contest, the United Kingdom finished in fifteenth place out of twenty-six competing entries with the song "Never Give Up on You" performed by Lucie Jones.

As part of its duties as participating broadcaster, the BBC organises the selection of its entry in the Eurovision Song Contest and broadcasts the event in the country. The broadcaster announced that it would participate in the 2018 contest on 29 September 2017. Between 2011 and 2015, BBC opted to internally select the British entry, while the broadcaster organised a national final featuring a competition among several artists and songs in 2016 and 2017. For their 2018 entry, BBC announced that a national final involving a public vote would be held to select United Kingdom's entry.

== Before Eurovision ==
=== Eurovision: You Decide ===
Eurovision: You Decide was the national final developed by the BBC in order to select the British entry for the Eurovision Song Contest 2018. Six acts competed in a televised show on 7 February 2018 held at the Brighton Dome in Brighton and hosted by Mel Giedroyc and previous Eurovision Song Contest winner Måns Zelmerlöw who won the contest for Sweden in 2015 with the song "Heroes". The winner was selected through the combination of the votes of a professional jury and a public vote. The show was broadcast on BBC Two as well as streamed online via the BBC iPlayer. The national final was watched by 900,000 viewers in the United Kingdom with a market share of 4.8%.

==== Competing entries ====
On 29 September 2017, BBC announced an open submission for interested artists to submit their songs in the form of a video recording. The submission period lasted until 27 October 2017. The received submissions from the open call were reviewed and a shortlist was compiled by the UK branch of the international OGAE fan club. Additional entries were provided to the BBC by former music director of RCA Records and founder of Innocent Records, Hugh Goldsmith, who held songwriting camps with professional songwriters and consulted with music industry experts including independent writers and members of the British Phonographic Industry (BPI) in order to encourage entry submissions and involvement in the national final. Songs from both entry methods were included in a final shortlist which was presented to a professional panel that ultimately selected six finalists to compete in the national final. The six competing songs were revealed on 24 January 2018, with two songs played each day that week during The Ken Bruce Show on BBC Radio 2.

In February 2023, Austria’s 2018 representative, Cesár Sampson revealed in an interview with The Euro Trip Podcast that he was invited by the BBC in late 2017 to compete in the UK’s national selection. Having accepted the invite, Sampson later rescinded it after his home country’s broadcaster, ORF, confirmed it wanted him to represent Austria at the contest. Sampson justified this decision as he had been in discussions with the host broadcaster prior to receiving the BBC's invitation to take part in Eurovision You Decide.

==== Final ====
Six acts competed in the televised final on 7 February 2018. In addition to their performances, the guest performer was Lucie Jones, who represented the United Kingdom in 2017 with the song "Never Give Up on You", performing an ABBA medley with Måns Zelmerlöw.

A panel of experts provided feedback regarding the songs during the show. The panel consisted of Rylan Clark-Neal (television presenter and Eurovision fan), Rochelle Humes (singer and television presenter) and Tom Fletcher (singer-songwriter and guitarist). A combination of the votes from an eight-member professional jury and a public vote consisting of televoting and online voting selected the winner. The jury and public vote each created a ranking from which points from 1 (lowest) to 6 (highest) were awarded, and after both sets of points were combined, "Storm" performed by SuRie was the winner. The jury consisted of David Grant (vocal coach), Caroline Sullivan (music journalist The Guardian), Roisin O'Connor (music correspondent The Independent), Steve Tandy (regional radio promoter), Sara Sesardic (music editor at Spotify), Alastair Webber (A&R manager), Marco Sensi (music editor at MTV Music) and Kele Le Roc (artist, writer and creative).

R/O	Artist	Song	Songwriter(s)	Place
1	Raya	"Crazy"	Emil Rosendal Lei; Greta Salóme Stefánsdóttir; Samir Salah Elshafie	—N/a
2	Liam Tamne	"Astronaut"	Ashley Hicklin; Jacob Pedersen; Jeanette Bonde; Rune Braager	—N/a
3	Asanda	"Legends"	Christopher Wortley; Laurell Barker; Roel Rats	—N/a
4	Jaz Ellington	"You"	Ashley Hicklin; Herman Gardarfve; Laura White	—N/a
5	SuRie	"Storm"	Nicole Blair; Gil Lewis; Sean Hargreaves	1
6	Goldstone	"I Feel the Love"	Eric Lumiere; Joakim Buddee; Laura White; Roel Rats	—N/a

=== Promotion ===
SuRie made several appearances across Europe to specifically promote "Storm" as the British Eurovision entry. Between 8 and 11 April, SuRie took part in promotional activities in Tel Aviv, Israel and performed during the Israel Calling event held at the Rabin Square. On 14 April, SuRie performed during the Eurovision in Concert event which was held at the AFAS Live venue in Amsterdam, Netherlands and hosted by Edsilia Rombley and Cornald Maas. On 21 April, SuRie performed during the ESPreParty event on 21 April which was held at the Sala La Riviera venue in Madrid, Spain and hosted by Soraya Arnelas.

In addition to their international appearances, on 17 April, SuRie performed during the London Eurovision Party, which was held at the Café de Paris venue in London and hosted by Nicki French and Paddy O'Connell. An acoustic version of "Storm" was also recorded and released on 23 April. On 28 April, SuRie was part of the guest line-up for the BBC One programme The Graham Norton Show where she performed "Storm" live and was interviewed by host Graham Norton.

== At Eurovision ==
According to Eurovision rules, all nations with the exceptions of the host country and the "Big Five" (France, Germany, Italy, Spain and the United Kingdom) are required to compete in one of two semi-finals, and qualify in order to participate in the final; the top ten countries from each semi-final progress to the final. As a member of the "Big Five", the United Kingdom automatically qualified to compete in the final on 12 May 2018. In addition to their participation in the final, the United Kingdom is also required to broadcast and vote in one of the two semi-finals. During the semi-final allocation draw on 29 January 2018, the United Kingdom was assigned to broadcast and vote in the first semi-final on 8 May 2018.

In the United Kingdom, the semi-finals were broadcast on BBC Four with commentary by Scott Mills and Rylan Clark-Neal, while the final was televised on BBC One with commentary by Graham Norton and broadcast on BBC Radio 2 with commentary by Ken Bruce. The British spokesperson, who announced the top 12-point score awarded by the British jury during the final, was Mel Giedroyc.

=== Final ===
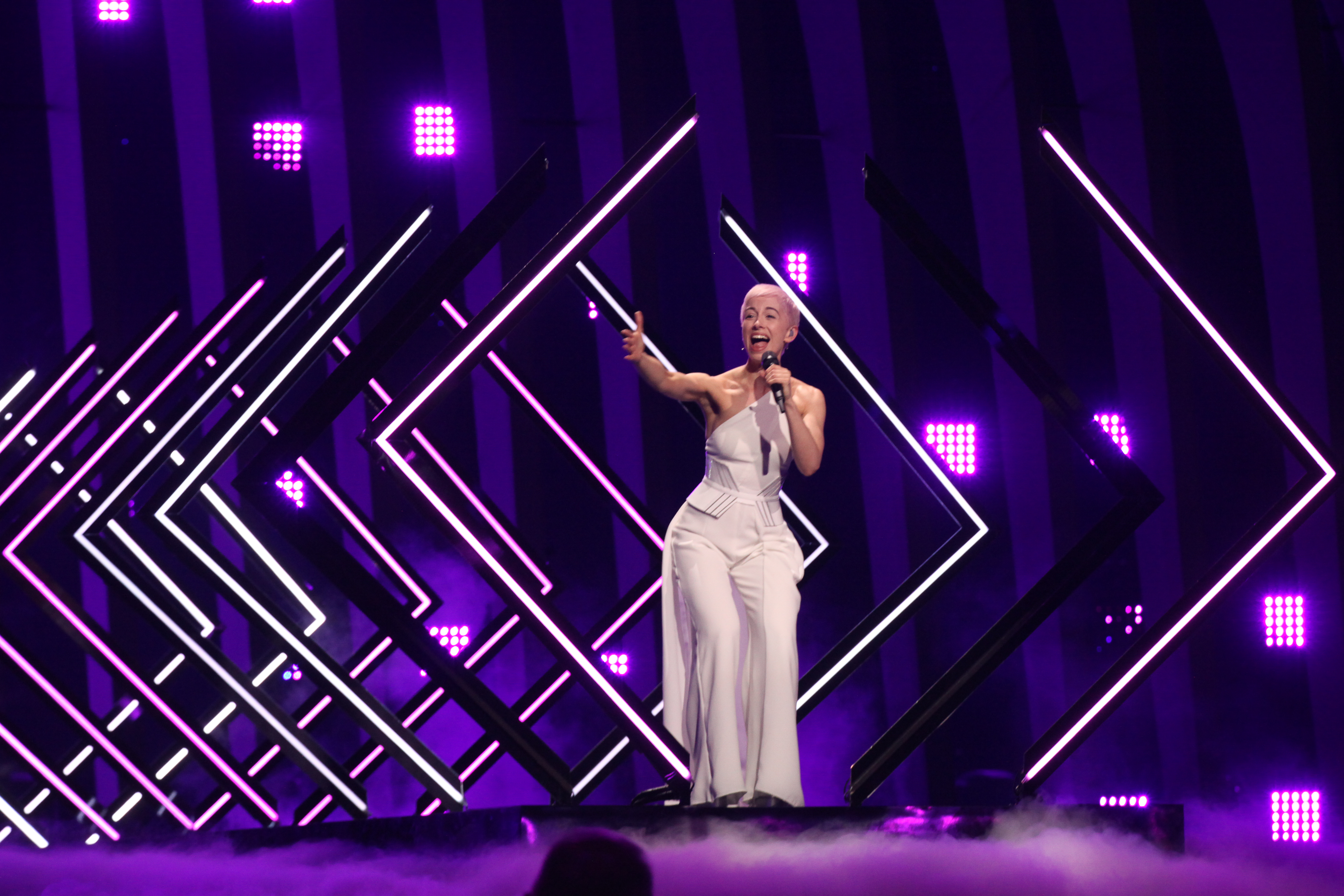
SuRie during a rehearsal before the final

SuRie took part in technical rehearsals on 4 and 6 May, followed by dress rehearsals on 7, 11 and 12 May. This included the semi-final jury show on 8 May where an extended clip of the British performance was filmed for broadcast during the live show on 8 May and the jury final on 11 May where the professional juries of each country watched and voted on the competing entries. After technical rehearsals were held on 6 May, the "Big Five" countries and host country Portugal held a press conference. As part of this press conference, the artists took part in a draw to determine which half of the grand final they would subsequently participate in. The United Kingdom was drawn to compete in the first half. Following the conclusion of the second semi-final, the shows' producers decided upon the running order of the final. The running order for the semi-finals and final was decided by the shows' producers rather than through another draw, so that similar songs were not placed next to each other. The United Kingdom was subsequently placed to perform in position 9, following the entry from Portugal and before the entry from Serbia.

The British performance featured SuRie dressed in a white wide-legged jumpsuit and performing on a predominately blue, purple and white coloured stage which featured a diamond-shaped light tunnel prop. The performance also featured smoke and pyrotechnic effects. During the performance, stage invader Dr ACactivism grabbed SuRie's microphone and shouted: "Modern Nazis of The UK media, we demand freedom! War is not peace!", before being removed by security and taken into police custody. The singer, who was without her microphone for about 10 seconds but was nevertheless able to finish her performance, was offered the opportunity to perform again after the entry from Italy by the European Broadcasting Union (EBU), however she declined as her team were "proud of her performance". Three off-stage backing vocalists joined SuRie for the performance and were Charlotte Churchman, Debby Bracknell and Mark De-Lisser. The United Kingdom placed twenty-fourth in the final, scoring 48 points: 25 points from the televoting and 23 points from the juries. During an interview on ITV magazine programme This Morning after the contest, SuRie revealed she had some bruises on her hands where Dr ACactivism had grabbed her and also on her shoulder where he had barged into her, but stated that she had not been seriously harmed by the incident.

=== Voting ===
Voting during the three shows involved each country awarding two sets of points from 1–8, 10 and 12: one from their professional jury and the other from televoting. Each nation's jury consisted of five music industry professionals who are citizens of the country they represent, with their names published before the contest to ensure transparency. This jury judged each entry based on: vocal capacity; the stage performance; the song's composition and originality; and the overall impression by the act. In addition, no member of a national jury was permitted to be related in any way to any of the competing acts in such a way that they cannot vote impartially and independently. The individual rankings of each jury member as well as the nation's televoting results were released shortly after the grand final.

Below is a breakdown of points awarded to the United Kingdom and awarded by United Kingdom in the first semi-final and grand final of the contest, and the breakdown of the jury voting and televoting conducted during the two shows:

==== Points awarded to the United Kingdom ====
Points awarded to the United Kingdom (Final)
Score	Televote	Jury
12 points		
10 points	Ireland	
8 points		Israel
7 points		
6 points	Australia	Italy
5 points		
4 points		
3 points	Albania; Denmark	France
2 points		Croatia; Latvia; Montenegro
1 point	Germany; Malta; San Marino	

==== Points awarded by the United Kingdom ====
Points awarded by the United Kingdom (Semi-final 1)
Score	Televote	Jury
12 points	Lithuania	Bulgaria
10 points	Ireland	Austria
8 points	Cyprus	Israel
7 points	Finland	Albania
6 points	Bulgaria	Estonia
5 points	Israel	Croatia
4 points	Estonia	Switzerland
3 points	Greece	Finland
2 points	Czech Republic	Armenia
1 point	Albania	Ireland

Points awarded by the United Kingdom (Final)
Score	Televote	Jury
12 points	Lithuania	Austria
10 points	Ireland	Israel
8 points	Cyprus	Bulgaria
7 points	Israel	Albania
6 points	Bulgaria	Estonia
5 points	Czech Republic	Norway
4 points	Moldova	Finland
3 points	Germany	Ireland
2 points	Denmark	Sweden
1 point	Australia	Spain

==== Detailed voting results ====
The following members comprised the British jury:

- Richard Beadle (jury chairperson) – musical director, orchestrator, composer
- Michelle Escoffery – singer-songwriter
- Natalie Shay – singer-songwriter
- Toby Lawrence – club and radio DJ
- Eady Crawford – singer

Detailed voting results from the United Kingdom (Semi-final 1)
R/O	Country	Jury							Televote	
R/O	Country	R. Beadle	M. Escoffery	N. Shay	T. Lawrence	E. Crawford	Rank	Points	Rank	Points
01	Azerbaijan	11	18	18	16	7	16		15	
02	Iceland	9	19	14	17	14	17		16	
03	Albania	2	2	3	10	5	4	7	10	1
04	Belgium	5	8	16	15	15	11		13	
05	Czech Republic	19	15	8	6	19	13		9	2
06	Lithuania	18	17	15	19	16	19		1	12
07	Israel	7	5	4	1	3	3	8	6	5
08	Belarus	12	14	17	9	8	14		14	
09	Estonia	8	3	5	14	6	5	6	7	4
10	Bulgaria	4	1	2	3	2	1	12	5	6
11	Macedonia	13	16	19	12	12	18		17	
12	Croatia	6	6	9	13	4	6	5	19	
13	Austria	3	4	1	5	1	2	10	11	
14	Greece	17	7	7	18	13	12		8	3
15	Finland	16	11	11	2	10	8	3	4	7
16	Armenia	10	9	6	8	11	9	2	18	
17	Switzerland	1	12	12	11	18	7	4	12	
18	Ireland	14	13	10	4	9	10	1	2	10
19	Cyprus	15	10	13	7	17	15		3	8

Detailed voting results from the United Kingdom (Final)
R/O	Country	Jury							Televote	
R/O	Country	R. Beadle	M. Escoffery	N. Shay	T. Lawrence	E. Crawford	Rank	Points	Rank	Points
01	Ukraine	23	19	10	13	14	18		23	
02	Spain	17	17	11	24	3	10	1	22	
03	Slovenia	12	18	21	5	11	13		24	
04	Lithuania	16	8	12	23	12	17		1	12
05	Austria	1	2	1	8	1	1	12	19	
06	Estonia	15	3	7	16	2	5	6	11	
07	Norway	4	21	3	11	7	6	5	15	
08	Portugal	21	15	19	19	13	23		18	
09	United Kingdom									
10	Serbia	24	22	24	14	9	20		25	
11	Germany	22	12	23	21	10	19		8	3
12	Albania	3	5	4	3	8	4	7	16	
13	France	19	13	17	15	15	22		21	
14	Czech Republic	6	23	8	10	16	11		6	5
15	Denmark	20	24	22	12	24	24		9	2
16	Australia	13	11	16	22	23	21		10	1
17	Finland	11	7	13	6	6	7	4	14	
18	Bulgaria	14	1	2	4	5	3	8	5	6
19	Moldova	8	9	18	9	22	14		7	4
20	Sweden	2	16	20	20	19	9	2	20	
21	Hungary	9	6	14	18	25	15		12	
22	Israel	5	4	5	1	4	2	10	4	7
23	Netherlands	10	20	6	17	20	16		13	
24	Ireland	18	10	9	2	18	8	3	2	10
25	Cyprus	7	14	15	7	21	12		3	8
26	Italy	25	25	25	25	17	25		17	
