= Italy in the Eurovision Song Contest 2018 =

- Eurovision Song Contest 2018
- Participating broadcaster: Radiotelevisione italiana (RAI)
- Country: Italy
- Selection process: Sanremo Music Festival 2018
- Selection date: 10 February 2018

Competing entry
- Song: "Non mi avete fatto niente"
- Artist: Ermal Meta and Fabrizio Moro
- Songwriters: Ermal Meta; Fabrizio Moro; Andrea Febo

Placement
- Final result: 5th, 308 points

Participation chronology

Italy was represented at the Eurovision Song Contest 2018 with the song "Non mi avete fatto niente", written by Ermal Meta, Fabrizio Moro, and Andrea Febo, and performed by Meta and Moro themselves. The Italian participating broadcaster, Radiotelevisione italiana (RAI), announced in October 2017 that the winning performer(s) of the Big Artists section of the Sanremo Music Festival 2018 would earn the right to represent the country at the contest.

== Background ==
Prior to the 2018 contest, Radiotelevisione italiana (RAI) had participated in the Eurovision Song Contest representing Italy forty-three times since its first entry during the inaugural contest in 1956. Since then, it has won the contest on two occasions: in 1964 with the song "Non ho l'età" performed by Gigliola Cinquetti and in 1990 with the song "Insieme: 1992" performed by Toto Cutugno. RAI has withdrawn from the Eurovision Song Contest a number of times with their most recent absence spanning from 1998 until 2010. Its return in 2011 with the song "Madness of Love", performed by Raphael Gualazzi, placed second—their highest result, to this point, since their victory in 1990. In 2017, the song "Occidentali's Karma" by Francesco Gabbani placed sixth with 334 points.

As part of its duties as participating broadcaster, RAI organises the selection of its entry in the Eurovision Song Contest and broadcasts the event in the country. The broadcaster confirmed its participation in the 2018 contest on 15 September 2017. Between 2011 and 2013, RAI used the Sanremo Music Festival as an artist selection pool where a special committee would select one of the competing artist, independent of the results in the competition, as the Eurovision entrant. The selected entrant was then responsible for selecting the song they would compete with. For 2014, RAI forwent using the Sanremo Music Festival artist lineup and internally selected their entry. Since 2015, the winning artist of the Sanremo Music Festival is rewarded with the opportunity to represent Italy at the Eurovision Song Contest, although in 2016 the winner declined and the broadcaster appointed the runner-up as the Italian entrant.

== Before Eurovision ==
=== Sanremo Music Festival 2018 ===
On 12 October 2017, Italian broadcaster RAI confirmed that the performer that would represent Italy at the 2018 Eurovision Song Contest would be selected from the competing artists at the Sanremo Music Festival 2018. According to the rules of Sanremo 2018, the winner of the Campioni or Big Artists category earns the right to represent Italy at the Eurovision Song Contest, but in case the artist is not available or refuses the offer, the organisers of the event reserve the right to choose another participant via their own criteria. The competition took place between 6–10 February 2018 with the winner being selected on the last day of the festival.

Twenty artists competed in the Big Artists category of Sanremo 2018. Among the competing artists were former Eurovision Song Contest entrants who represented Italy: Riccardo Fogli in 1983, Luca Barbarossa in 1988, Enrico Ruggeri, frontman of Decibel in 1993, and Nina Zilli in 2012. The performers in the "Big Artists" category were:

Artist	Song	Songwriter(s)
Annalisa	"Il mondo prima di te"	Annalisa Scarrone, Davide Simonetta, Alessandro Raina
Decibel	"Lettera dal Duca"	Silvio Capeccia, Enrico Ruggeri, Fulvio Muzio
Diodato and Roy Paci	"Adesso"	Antonio Diodato
Elio e le Storie Tese	"Arrivedorci"	Sergio Conforti, Stefano Belisari, Davide Luca Civaschi, Nicola Fasani
Enzo Avitabile feat. Peppe Servillo	"Il coraggio di ogni giorno"	Pacifico, Enzo Avitabile, Peppe Servillo
Ermal Meta and Fabrizio Moro	"Non mi avete fatto niente"	Ermal Meta, Fabrizio Moro, Andrea Febo
Giovanni Caccamo	"Eterno"	Cheope, Giovanni Caccamo
The Kolors	"Frida (mai, mai, mai)"	Davide Petrella, Dario Faini, Alessandro Raina, Antonio "Stash" Fiordispino
Le Vibrazioni	"Così sbagliato"	Francesco Sarcina, Andrea Bonomo, Luca Chiaravalli, Davide Simonetta
Lo Stato Sociale	"Una vita in vacanza"	Lodovico Guenzi, Alberto Gazzola, Francesco Draicchio, Matteo Romagnoli, Alberto Guidetti, Enrico Roberto
Luca Barbarossa	"Passame er sale"	Luca Barbarossa
Mario Biondi	"Rivederti"	Mario Biondi, Giuseppe Furnari, Fisicaro
Max Gazzè	"La leggenda di Cristalda e Pizzomunno"	Francesco Gazzè, Max Gazzè, Francesco De Benedettis
Nina Zilli	"Senza appartenere"	Giordana Angi, Antonio Iammarino, Nina Zilli
Noemi	"Non smettere mai di cercarmi"	Diego Calvetti, Massimiliano Pelan, Veronica Scopelliti, Fabio De Martino
Ornella Vanoni feat. Bungaro and Pacifico	"Imparare ad amarsi"	Bungaro, Pacifico, Cesare Chiodo, Antonio Fresa
Red Canzian	"Ognuno ha il suo racconto"	Red Canzian, Michele Porru
Renzo Rubino	"Custodire"	Renzo Rubino
Roby Facchinetti and Riccardo Fogli	"Il segreto del tempo"	Pacifico, Roby Facchinetti
Ron	"Almeno pensami"	Lucio Dalla

==== Final ====
During the final evening of the Sanremo Music Festival 2018, Ermal Meta and Fabrizio Moro were selected as the winners with the song "Non mi avete fatto niente". RAI later confirmed during the closing press conference for the Sanremo Music Festival on 10 February 2018 that Meta and Moro had agreed to participate in Eurovision and would perform their Sanremo song "Non mi avete fatto niente" at the contest in Lisbon.

First Round – 10 February 2018
R/O	Artist	Song	Expert Jury (20%)	Press Jury (30%)	Televote (50%)	Total	Place
1	Luca Barbarossa	"Passame er sale"	3	11	4	6.83%	7
2	Red Canzian	"Ognuno ha il suo racconto"	13	16	13	2.06%	15
3	The Kolors	"Frida (mai, mai, mai)"	10	8	5	5.99%	9
4	Elio e le Storie Tese	"Arrivedorci"	16	19	19	1.14%	20
5	Ron	"Almeno pensami"	1	7	7	7.13%	4
6	Max Gazzè	"La leggenda di Cristalda e Pizzomunno"	5	4	6	6.93%	6
7	Annalisa	"Il mondo prima di te"	6	6	3	8.31%	3
8	Renzo Rubino	"Custodire"	17	12	11	2.69%	13
9	Decibel	"Lettera dal Duca"	17	15	15	1.99%	16
10	Ornella Vanoni feat. Bungaro and Pacifico	"Imparare ad amarsi"	2	4	8	7.07%	5
11	Giovanni Caccamo	"Eterno"	11	13	10	2.99%	10
12	Lo Stato Sociale	"Una vita in vacanza"	8	1	2	10.50%	2
13	Roby Facchinetti and Riccardo Fogli	"Il segreto del tempo"	17	19	12	1.70%	18
14	Diodato and Roy Paci	"Adesso"	6	2	9	6.78%	8
15	Nina Zilli	"Senza appartenere"	11	17	18	1.94%	17
16	Noemi	"Non smettere mai di cercarmi"	17	14	16	2.09%	14
17	Ermal Meta and Fabrizio Moro	"Non mi avete fatto niente"	4	3	1	16.56%	1
18	Mario Biondi	"Rivederti"	9	17	20	1.69%	19
19	Le Vibrazioni	"Così sbagliato"	13	8	17	2.82%	11
20	Enzo Avitabile feat. Peppe Servillo	"Il coraggio di ogni giorno"	13	10	14	2.79%	12

Second Round – 10 February 2018
R/O	Artist	Song	Jury (50%)	Televote (50%)	Total	Place
1	Annalisa	"Il mondo prima di te"	23.69%	23.49%	26.94%	3
2	Lo Stato Sociale	"Una vita in vacanza"	38.00%	22.10%	28.40%	2
3	Ermal Meta and Fabrizio Moro	"Non mi avete fatto niente"	38.31%	54.41%	44.66%	1

== At Eurovision ==
The Eurovision Song Contest 2018 took place at the Altice Arena in Lisbon, Portugal and consisted of two semi-finals on 8 and 10 May and the final on 12 May 2018. According to Eurovision rules, all nations with the exceptions of the host country and the "Big Five" (France, Germany, Italy, Spain and the United Kingdom) are required to qualify from one of two semi-finals in order to compete for the final; the top ten countries from each semi-final progress to the final. As a member of the "Big Five", Italy automatically qualified to compete in the final. In addition to their participation in the final, Italy was also required to broadcast and vote in one of the two semi-finals.

=== Voting ===
==== Points awarded to Italy ====
Points awarded to Italy (Final)
Score	Televote	Jury
12 points	Albania; Germany; Malta	Albania
10 points	Austria; Croatia; France; Portugal; Slovenia	Malta
8 points	Greece; Moldova; Montenegro; San Marino; Switzerland	Cyprus; Serbia
7 points	Cyprus; Estonia; Lithuania; Netherlands; Spain	
6 points	Belgium; Bulgaria; Finland; Hungary; Latvia; Macedonia; Romania; Russia; Serbia	
5 points	Azerbaijan; Georgia; Israel; Poland; Ukraine	
4 points	Belarus	Finland; Montenegro; Portugal; San Marino
3 points	Armenia	Spain
2 points	Czech Republic	
1 point		Greece; Russia

==== Points awarded by Italy ====
Points awarded by Italy (Semi-final 2)
Score	Televote	Jury
12 points	Romania	Norway
10 points	Moldova	Denmark
8 points	Ukraine	Malta
7 points	Denmark	Australia
6 points	Hungary	Sweden
5 points	Slovenia	San Marino
4 points	Serbia	Moldova
3 points	Poland	Netherlands
2 points	Russia	Slovenia
1 point	Norway	Serbia

Points awarded by Italy (Final)
Score	Televote	Jury
12 points	Albania	Norway
10 points	Moldova	Germany
8 points	Ukraine	Denmark
7 points	Israel	Austria
6 points	Estonia	United Kingdom
5 points	Cyprus	Ireland
4 points	Denmark	Estonia
3 points	Germany	Cyprus
2 points	Hungary	Israel
1 point	Serbia	Sweden

==== Detailed voting results ====
The following members comprised the Italian jury:

- Silvia Gavarotti (jury chairperson) – singer
- Antonella Nesi – journalist
- Sandro Comini – conductor
- Matteo Catalano – author
- Barbara Mosconi – journalist

Detailed voting results from Italy (Semi-final 2)
R/O	Country	Jury							Televote		
R/O	Country	A. Nesi	S. Comini	S. Gavarotti	M. Catalano	B. Mosconi	Rank	Points	Percentage	Rank	Points
01	Norway	1	3	2	1	2	1	12	4.13%	10	1
02	Romania	12	11	14	17	13	16		12.24%	1	12
03	Serbia	13	9	6	14	7	10	1	5.31%	7	4
04	San Marino	5	6	9	3	11	6	5	2.79%	15	
05	Denmark	2	1	1	4	3	2	10	8.77%	4	7
06	Russia	6	12	12	18	18	14		4.45%	9	2
07	Moldova	3	10	5	8	17	7	4	12.15%	2	10
08	Netherlands	14	18	4	12	4	8	3	3.53%	11	
09	Australia	7	2	8	6	5	4	7	3.25%	12	
10	Georgia	15	7	7	11	9	11		2.08%	17	
11	Poland	11	17	10	15	6	12		4.85%	8	3
12	Malta	8	4	3	2	8	3	8	2.88%	13	
13	Hungary	9	15	18	10	10	15		8.39%	5	6
14	Latvia	16	8	13	7	14	13		2.43%	16	
15	Sweden	4	13	15	9	1	5	6	2.88%	14	
16	Montenegro	18	16	17	13	16	18		1.59%	18	
17	Slovenia	17	5	11	5	12	9	2	6.34%	6	5
18	Ukraine	10	14	16	16	15	17		11.94%	3	8

Detailed voting results from Italy (Final)
R/O	Country	Jury							Televote		
R/O	Country	A. Nesi	S. Comini	S. Gavarotti	M. Catalano	B. Mosconi	Rank	Points	Percentage	Rank	Points
01	Ukraine	24	24	20	25	24	25		11.46%	3	8
02	Spain	16	17	10	13	12	16		1.88%	17	
03	Slovenia	23	18	21	22	23	24		1.42%	22	
04	Lithuania	9	15	9	15	15	14		2.44%	13	
05	Austria	22	10	3	1	6	4	7	2.21%	15	
06	Estonia	11	2	4	16	22	7	4	5.38%	5	6
07	Norway	2	3	2	3	3	1	12	1.80%	19	
08	Portugal	21	21	23	14	21	23		0.98%	25	
09	United Kingdom	10	9	5	2	4	5	6	1.42%	21	
10	Serbia	20	13	15	23	18	19		3.16%	10	1
11	Germany	1	7	16	4	1	2	10	3.75%	8	3
12	Albania	19	12	6	17	25	15		16.79%	1	12
13	France	4	16	17	6	7	11		1.95%	16	
14	Czech Republic	12	20	18	18	17	18		2.49%	12	
15	Denmark	8	1	1	10	8	3	8	4.09%	7	4
16	Australia	7	6	19	12	11	12		1.34%	23	
17	Finland	15	22	22	20	13	21		1.50%	20	
18	Bulgaria	14	23	13	24	19	20		3.02%	11	
19	Moldova	13	19	14	11	20	17		13.18%	2	10
20	Sweden	5	14	24	21	2	10	1	1.33%	24	
21	Hungary	18	25	25	19	14	22		3.32%	9	2
22	Israel	3	8	11	9	10	9	2	6.79%	4	7
23	Netherlands	17	11	8	8	9	13		1.82%	18	
24	Ireland	25	4	7	7	5	6	5	2.24%	14	
25	Cyprus	6	5	12	5	16	8	3	4.26%	6	5
26	Italy										
