= Norway in the Eurovision Song Contest 2018 =

- Eurovision Song Contest 2018
- Participating broadcaster: Norsk rikskringkasting (NRK)
- Country: Norway
- Selection process: Melodi Grand Prix 2018
- Selection date: 10 March 2018

Competing entry
- Song: "That's How You Write a Song"
- Artist: Alexander Rybak
- Songwriters: Alexander Rybak

Placement
- Semi-final result: Qualified (1st, 266 points)
- Final result: 15th, 144 points

Participation chronology

Norway was represented at the Eurovision Song Contest 2018 with the song "That's How You Write a Song", written and performed by Alexander Rybak, who had previously represented the country in the Eurovision Song Contest in 2009 and won with the song "Fairytale". The Norwegian participating broadcaster, Norsk rikskringkasting (NRK), organised the national final Melodi Grand Prix 2018 in order to select the Norwegian entry for the contest. Ten entries competed in a show that took place on 10 March 2018 and the winner was determined over three rounds of voting.

Norway was drawn to compete in the second semi-final of the Eurovision Song Contest which took place on 10 May 2018. Performing as the opening entry during the show in position 1, "That's How You Write a Song" was announced among the top 10 entries of the second semi-final and therefore qualified to compete in the final on 12 May. It was later revealed that Norway placed first out of the 18 participating countries in the semi-final with 266 points. In the final, Norway performed in position 7 and placed fifteenth out of the 26 participating countries, scoring 144 points.

== Background ==
Prior to the 2018 contest, Norway had participated in the Eurovision Song Contest 56 times since their first entry in 1960. Norway had won the contest on three occasions: in 1985 with the song "La det swinge" performed by Bobbysocks!, in 1995 with the song "Nocturne" performed by Secret Garden, and in 2009 with the song "Fairytale" performed by Alexander Rybak. Norway also had the two dubious distinctions of having finished last in the Eurovision final more than any other country and for having the most "nul points" (zero points) in the contest, the latter being a record the nation shared together with Austria. The country had finished last eleven times and had failed to score a point during four contests. Following the introduction of semi-finals for the 2004, Norway has finished in the top ten seven times, including their 2017 entry "Grab the Moment" performed by Jowst.

The Norwegian national broadcaster, Norsk rikskringkasting (NRK), broadcasts the event within Norway and organises the selection process for the nation's entry. NRK confirmed their intentions to participate at the 2018 Eurovision Song Contest on 15 May 2017. The broadcaster has traditionally organised the national final Melodi Grand Prix, which has selected the Norwegian entry for the Eurovision Song Contest in all but one of their participation. Along with their participation confirmation, NRK revealed details regarding their selection procedure and announced the organization of Melodi Grand Prix 2018 in order to select the 2018 Norwegian entry.

== Before Eurovision ==
=== Melodi Grand Prix 2018 ===
Melodi Grand Prix 2018 was the 56th edition of the Norwegian national final Melodi Grand Prix and selected Norway's entry for the Eurovision Song Contest 2018. The show took place on 10 March 2018 at the Oslo Spektrum in Oslo, hosted by Silya Nymoen and Kåre Magnus Bergh. Stig Karlsen was assigned as the new music producer for the competition, replacing Jan Fredrik Karlsen who held the position since 2016. The show was televised on NRK1, broadcast via radio with commentary by Ole Christian Øen on NRK P1 as well as streamed online on NRK TV. The national final was watched by 1.001 million viewers in Norway with a market share of 68.6%.

==== Competing entries ====
A submission period was opened by NRK between 31 January 2017 and 10 September 2017. Songwriters of any nationality were allowed to submit entries, while performers of the selected songs would be chosen by NRK in consultation with the songwriters. In addition to the public call for submissions, NRK reserved the right to directly invite certain artists and composers to compete. At the close of the deadline, a record-breaking 1,200 submissions were received. Ten songs were selected for the competition by several focus groups including NRK music editors, members of OGAE Norway and members of the public of different ages, and the competing acts and songs were revealed on 15 January 2018 during a press conference at NRK's Store Studio, presented by Silya Nymoen and Kåre Magnus Bergh and broadcast via NRK1 and online at mgp.no. Among the competing artists were former Norwegian Eurovision Song Contest entrants Alexander Rybak who represented the country and won the contest in 2009, Stella Mwangi who represented the country in 2011 and Aleksander Walmann who represented the country in 2017 alongside Jowst. Kåre Magnus Bergh also presented the artists on NRK P1 during the radio show Snart MGP between 10 February and 12 March.

==== Final ====
Ten songs competed during the final on 10 March 2018. The winner was selected over three rounds of voting. In the first round, the top four entries were selected by a 50/50 combination of votes from ten international juries and a public televote to proceed to the second round, the Gold Final. The viewers and the juries each had a total of 580 points to award. Each jury group distributed their points as follows: 1–8, 10 and 12 points, and only the 12 points of each jury were announced during the show. The viewer vote was based on the percentage of votes each song achieved. For example, if a song gained 10% of the viewer vote, then that entry would be awarded 10% of 580 points rounded to the nearest integer: 58 points. In the Gold Final, the top two entries were selected by public televoting to proceed to the third round, the Gold Duel. In the Gold Duel, an additional round of public televoting was held and the votes were aggregated to the results of the Gold Final, leading to the victory of "That's How You Write a Song" performed by Alexander Rybak with 306,393 votes.

In addition to the performances of the competing entries, the interval acts featured performances of past Norwegian Eurovision entries: Karoline Krüger performed the 1988 entry "For vår jord" together with 1977 and 1979 Norwegian entrant Anita Skorgan, while Jowst and Aleksander Walmann performed the 2017 entry "Grab the Moment".

Final – 10 March 2018
R/O	Artist	Song	Songwriter(s)	Result
1	Stella and Alexandra	"You Got Me"	Stella Mwangi, Gustav Eurén, Niclas Arn, Andreas Alfredsson	Advanced
2	Aleksander Walmann	"Talk to the Hand"	Joakim With Steen, Jonas McDonnell, Magnus Klausen, Aleksander Walmann	Advanced
3	Ida Maria	"Scandilove"	Ida Maria Børli Sivertsen, Stefan Törnby	—N/a
4	Nicoline	"Light Me Up"	Nicoline Berg Kaasin, Johan Larsson, Emilie Adams	—N/a
5	Tom Hugo	"I Like I Like I Like"	Tom Hugo Hermansen	—N/a
6	Charla K	"Stop the Music"	Charlotte Kjær, Per Gessle, Alex Shield	—N/a
7	Alejandro Fuentes	"Tengo otra"	Alejandro Fuentes, Angel Arce Pututi, Alejandro Pututi	—N/a
8	Vidar Villa	"Moren din"	Vidar André Mohaugen, Jonas Thomassen, Martin Thomassen	—N/a
9	Rebecca	"Who We Are"	Kjetil Mørland	Advanced
10	Alexander Rybak	"That's How You Write a Song"	Alexander Rybak	Advanced

Detailed International Jury Votes
R/O	Song	France	Russia	Czech Republic	Denmark	Bulgaria	Estonia	Macedonia	Israel	Sweden	United Kingdom
R/O	Song	France	Russia	Czech Republic	Denmark	Bulgaria	Estonia	North Macedonia	Israel	Sweden	United Kingdom
1	"You Got Me"	X									X
2	"Talk to the Hand"								X		
3	"Scandilove"										
4	"Light Me Up"										
5	"I Like I Like I Like"										
6	"Stop the Music"										
7	"Tengo otra"										
8	"Moren din"										
9	"Who We Are"				X	X				X	
10	"That's How You Write a Song"		X	X			X	X			
International Jury Spokespersons
France: Edoardo Grassi; Russia: Ekaterina Orlova; Czech Republic: Jan Bors; Denmark: Molly Plank; Bulgaria: Vasil Ivanov; Estonia: Mart Normet; Macedonia: Aleksandra Jovanovska; Israel: Alon Amir; Sweden: Helen Mattsson; United Kingdom: William Lee Adams

Gold Final – 10 March 2018
R/O	Artist	Song	Televote	Place
1	Stella and Alexandra	"You Got Me"	29,784	3
2	Aleksander Walmann	"Talk to the Hand"	7,927	4
3	Rebecca	"Who We Are"	46,260	2
4	Alexander Rybak	"That's How You Write a Song"	133,164	1

Gold Duel – 10 March 2018
R/O	Artist	Song	Televote			Place
R/O	Artist	Song	Gold Final	Gold Duel	Total	Place
1	Rebecca	"Who We Are"	46,260	77,244	123,504	2
2	Alexander Rybak	"That's How You Write a Song"	133,164	173,229	306,393	1

== At Eurovision ==
According to Eurovision rules, all nations with the exceptions of the host country and the "Big Five" (France, Germany, Italy, Spain and the United Kingdom) are required to qualify from one of two semi-finals in order to compete for the final; the top ten countries from each semi-final progress to the final. The European Broadcasting Union (EBU) split up the competing countries into six different pots based on voting patterns from previous contests, with countries with favourable voting histories put into the same pot. On 29 January 2018, an allocation draw was held which placed each country into one of the two semi-finals, as well as which half of the show they would perform in. Norway was placed into the second semi-final, to be held on 10 May 2018, and was scheduled to perform in the first half of the show.

Once all the competing songs for the 2018 contest had been released, the running order for the semi-finals was decided by the shows' producers rather than through another draw, so that similar songs were not placed next to each other. Norway was set to open the show and perform in position 1, before the entry from Romania.

In Norway, the two semi-finals and the final were broadcast on NRK1 with commentary by Olav Viksmo-Slettan. An alternative broadcast of the final was also televised on NRK3 with commentary by the hosts of the NRK P3 radio show P3morgen Ronny Brede Aase, Silje Reiten Nordnes and Markus Ekrem Neby. The final was also broadcast via radio on NRK P1 with commentary by Ole Christian Øen. The Norwegian spokespersons announcing the top 12-point score awarded by the Norwegian jury during the final were Jowst and Aleksander Walmann, which together represented Norway in 2017.

=== Semi-final ===
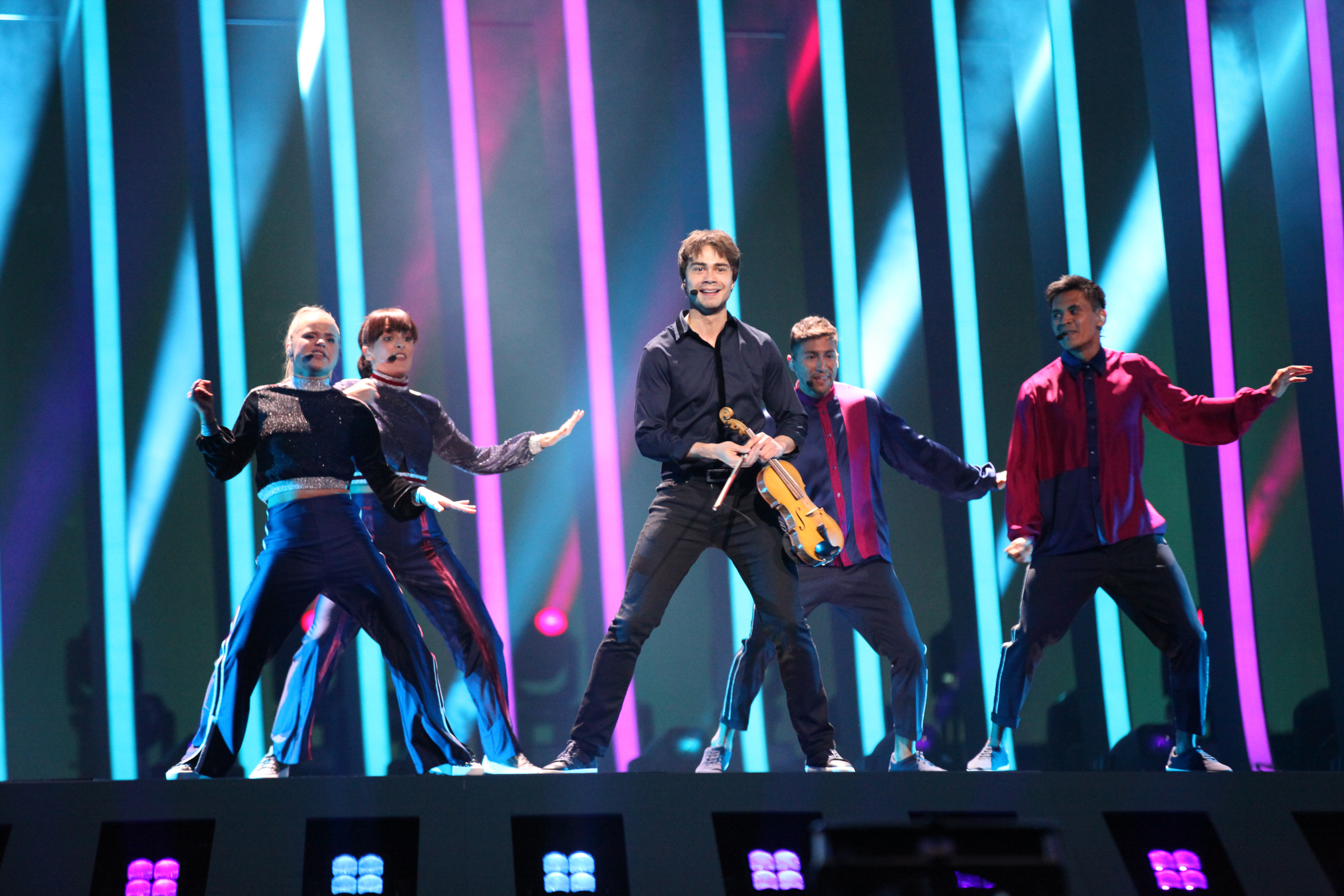
Alexander Rybak during a rehearsal before the first semi-final

Alexander Rybak took part in technical rehearsals on 1 and 4 May, followed by dress rehearsals on 9 and 10 May. This included the jury show on 9 May where the professional juries of each country watched and voted on the competing entries.

The Norwegian performance featured Alexander Rybak performing on stage in a dark blue shirt and black trousers as well as a blue jacket for the first half of the song. The performance began with Rybak interacting with on-screen graphics of a virtual piano, violin and football, and four dancers joined the singer at the beginning of the first chorus. Towards the end of the song, Rybak played the violin. The stage colours were predominantly blue and pink, and the performance also featured pyrotechnic effects. The four dancers, all of them which also performed backing vocals, on stage with Alexander Rybak were: Alvaro Estrella, Jens Jeffry Trinidad, Lene Kokai Flage and Lisa Børud. The performers were also joined by an additional off-stage backing vocalist: Frode Vassel.

At the end of the show, Norway was announced as having finished in the top 10 and subsequently qualifying for the grand final. It was later revealed that Norway placed first in the semi-final, receiving a total of 266 points: 133 points from both the televoting and the juries.

=== Final ===
Shortly after the second semi-final, a winners' press conference was held for the ten qualifying countries. As part of this press conference, the qualifying artists took part in a draw to determine which half of the grand final they would subsequently participate in. This draw was done in the order the countries were announced during the semi-final. Norway was drawn to compete in the first half. Following this draw, the shows' producers decided upon the running order of the final, as they had done for the semi-finals. Norway was subsequently placed to perform in position 7, following the entry from Estonia and before the entry from Portugal.

Alexander Rybak once again took part in dress rehearsals on 11 and 12 May before the final, including the jury final where the professional juries cast their final votes before the live show. Alexander Rybak performed a repeat of his semi-final performance during the final on 12 May. Norway placed fifteenth in the final, scoring 144 points: 84 points from the televoting and 60 points from the juries.

=== Voting ===
Voting during the three shows involved each country awarding two sets of points from 1-8, 10 and 12: one from their professional jury and the other from televoting. Each nation's jury consisted of five music industry professionals who are citizens of the country they represent, with their names published before the contest to ensure transparency. This jury judged each entry based on: vocal capacity; the stage performance; the song's composition and originality; and the overall impression by the act. In addition, no member of a national jury was permitted to be related in any way to any of the competing acts in such a way that they cannot vote impartially and independently. The individual rankings of each jury member as well as the nation's televoting results were released shortly after the grand final.

Below is a breakdown of points awarded to Norway and awarded by Norway in the second semi-final and grand final of the contest, and the breakdown of the jury voting and televoting conducted during the two shows:

==== Points awarded to Norway ====
Points awarded to Norway (Semi-final 2)
Score	Televote	Jury
12 points	Denmark	Italy; Malta; Sweden
10 points	Netherlands; Slovenia; Sweden	Netherlands; Russia
8 points	Hungary; Russia; Ukraine	Australia; Serbia
7 points	Poland; San Marino	Hungary; San Marino; Slovenia
6 points	Australia; Malta; Moldova; Romania; Serbia	Denmark; Montenegro
5 points	Georgia; Montenegro	Georgia; Germany; Latvia
4 points	France; Germany; Latvia	Moldova; Poland
3 points		
2 points		France; Romania
1 point	Italy	Ukraine

Points awarded to Norway (Final)
Score	Televote	Jury
12 points		Italy
10 points	Belarus	
8 points	Denmark; Sweden	Belarus
7 points	Armenia; Azerbaijan	Montenegro
6 points		Serbia
5 points	Cyprus; Hungary; Moldova; Russia; Slovenia	Croatia; United Kingdom
4 points	Iceland	Estonia; Malta
3 points	Greece; Serbia; Spain	Netherlands
2 points	Estonia; Latvia	Hungary; Moldova; Sweden
1 point	Australia; Netherlands	

==== Points awarded by Norway ====
Points awarded by Norway (Semi-final 2)
Score	Televote	Jury
12 points	Denmark	Sweden
10 points	Sweden	Australia
8 points	Australia	Netherlands
7 points	Netherlands	Latvia
6 points	Poland	Malta
5 points	Moldova	Slovenia
4 points	Ukraine	Russia
3 points	Slovenia	Ukraine
2 points	Hungary	Romania
1 point	Serbia	Poland

Points awarded by Norway (Final)
Score	Televote	Jury
12 points	Lithuania	Germany
10 points	Denmark	Sweden
8 points	Austria	Austria
7 points	Israel	France
6 points	Germany	Australia
5 points	Netherlands	Cyprus
4 points	Czech Republic	Netherlands
3 points	Sweden	Lithuania
2 points	Cyprus	Spain
1 point	France	Ireland

==== Detailed voting results ====
The following members comprised the Norwegian jury:

- Guri Schanke (jury chairperson) – artist, represented Norway in the 2007 contest
- Steffen Falch (Spira) – rapper, artist
- Andre Bravo – DJ
- Ingeborg Walther – artist
- Hanne Haugsand – artist, represented Norway in the 2000 contest as member of Charmed

Detailed voting results from Norway (Semi-final 2)
R/O	Country	Jury							Televote	
R/O	Country	Spira	A. Bravo	I. Walther	H. Haugsand	G. Schanke	Rank	Points	Rank	Points
01	Norway									
02	Romania	7	13	9	10	10	9	2	13	
03	Serbia	12	10	13	7	9	11		10	1
04	San Marino	14	9	12	15	15	15		17	
05	Denmark	13	17	14	8	7	12		1	12
06	Russia	3	5	11	11	16	7	4	15	
07	Moldova	17	14	15	16	8	16		6	5
08	Netherlands	1	7	4	5	2	3	8	4	7
09	Australia	5	2	3	2	4	2	10	3	8
10	Georgia	16	16	8	14	13	14		12	
11	Poland	4	8	17	17	17	10	1	5	6
12	Malta	10	4	2	4	3	5	6	14	
13	Hungary	11	15	16	12	14	17		9	2
14	Latvia	2	3	7	3	5	4	7	11	
15	Sweden	8	1	1	1	1	1	12	2	10
16	Montenegro	15	12	10	13	11	13		16	
17	Slovenia	6	6	5	6	12	6	5	8	3
18	Ukraine	9	11	6	9	6	8	3	7	4

Detailed voting results from Norway (Final)
R/O	Country	Jury							Televote	
R/O	Country	Spira	A. Bravo	I. Walther	H. Haugsand	G. Schanke	Rank	Points	Rank	Points
01	Ukraine	10	19	17	23	22	19		20	
02	Spain	15	4	9	13	7	9	2	24	
03	Slovenia	14	14	20	21	19	21		23	
04	Lithuania	8	8	14	7	6	8	3	1	12
05	Austria	7	5	3	6	3	3	8	3	8
06	Estonia	16	25	12	14	23	20		15	
07	Norway									
08	Portugal	11	6	21	10	8	11		25	
09	United Kingdom	13	13	8	22	10	15		14	
10	Serbia	17	21	16	18	17	22		21	
11	Germany	1	2	2	3	2	1	12	5	6
12	Albania	3	16	18	16	18	12		22	
13	France	4	9	4	2	13	4	7	10	1
14	Czech Republic	5	15	11	17	21	13		7	4
15	Denmark	20	24	23	20	14	23		2	10
16	Australia	6	7	5	4	11	5	6	12	
17	Finland	18	18	19	9	16	17		13	
18	Bulgaria	19	17	22	5	12	14		16	
19	Moldova	25	20	25	25	24	25		17	
20	Sweden	12	1	1	1	1	2	10	8	3
21	Hungary	22	22	24	24	25	24		18	
22	Israel	23	12	13	12	20	16		4	7
23	Netherlands	2	10	6	15	9	7	4	6	5
24	Ireland	9	11	10	19	5	10	1	19	
25	Cyprus	24	3	7	8	4	6	5	9	2
26	Italy	21	23	15	11	15	18		11	
