= ITB Berlin =

Trade fair

Coordinates: 52°30′14″N 13°16′24″E

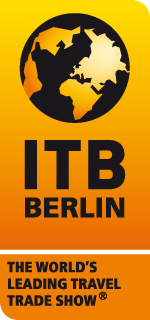

The ITB Berlin (Internationale Tourismus-Börse Berlin) is the world's largest tourism trade fair. The companies represented at the fair include hotels, tourist boards, tour operators, system providers, airlines and car rental companies.

The ITB Berlin takes place annually in March at the Messe Berlin. The fair always has an official partner country, in 2018 (March 7–11) represented by the German state of Mecklenburg-Vorpommern. In 2020 the ITB Berlin did not take place. Due to the rapid spread of the new coronavirus (COVID-19) the Federal Ministry of Health and the Federal Ministry of Economics have stated their opinion that ITB Berlin be cancelled. ITB Berlin 2021 and 2022 both took place entirely as virtual events.

ITB Berlin (or just ITB) has been running since 1966 and now has managed to establish satellite events in China, India and Singapore.

The market segments help visitors and exhibitors to find their way through the product range of ITB Berlin: Book World, Business Travel Days, Cruises, Cultural Tourism, Economy Accommodation, eTravel World, Adventure & Responsible Tourism, Gay & Lesbian Travel, ITB Mobile Travel Services, Training and Employment (Career Center), Travel Technology, Trends & Events, Wellness, Youth Travel.

In 2012, about 7,000 journalists attended the ITB Berlin, of whom about 1,500 came from abroad. In addition to the industry's leading trade magazines, business and travel journalists from 94 countries also report on the latest travel trends and products. 11,000 exhibitors from 180 countries welcomed 170,000 visitors, among these, 113,000 were trade visitors.
