= Livet på en pinne =

Single by Edward Blom
- Released: 26 February 2018
- Recorded: 2017
- Genre: Novelty
- Length: 2:50
- Label: Universal Music Sweden
- Songwriters: Edward Blom; Thomas G:son; Stefan Brunzell; Kent Olsson
- Producers: Edward Blom; Thomas G:son; Stefan Brunzell; Kent Olsson

"Livet på en pinne" (transl. Life on a stick) is a song recorded by Swedish television personality Edward Blom. The song was released as a digital download in Sweden on 26 February 2018 and peaked at number 51 on the Swedish Singles Chart. It took part in Melodifestivalen 2018, but did not qualify out of the first semi-final on 3 February 2018. It was written by Blom along with Thomas G:son, Stefan Brunzell, and Kent Olsson.

== Track listing ==
Digital download
No.	Title	Length
1.	"Livet på en pinne"	2:50
2.	"Livet på en pinne" (Singback)	2:51

== Charts ==
Chart (2018)	Peak position
Sweden (Sverigetopplistan)	51

== Release history ==
Region	Date	Format	Label
Sweden	26 February 2018	Digital download	Universal Music Sweden
