= All the Feels =

All the Feels may refer to:

- "All the Feels" (song), a 2018 song by Renaida
- All the Feels (album), a 2019 album by Fitz and the Tantrums, or the title song
