= Everyday (DJ Méndez song) =

Single by Méndez
- Released: 26 February 2018
- Recorded: 2017
- Length: 3:05
- Label: Universal Music Sweden
- Songwriters: Leopoldo Mendez; Jimmy Jansson; Palle Hammarlund

Méndez singles chronology
"Touch and Go" (2012)	"Everyday" (2018)	"Under the Sea (Bajo el Mar)" (2019)

"Everyday" is a song recorded by Chilean-Swedish singer DJ Méndez. The song was released as a digital download on 26 February 2018, and peaked at number five on the Swedish Singles Chart. Méndez took part with this song in Melodifestivalen 2018 and qualified for the Andra Chansen round from the third semi-final on 17 February, 2018. In the Andra Chansen (second chance) round, it was the fourth and last out of the eight songs from that round to qualify for the grand final, ahead of Sigrid Bernson's "Patrick Swayze". In the final, it was performed first but finished last in the results.

It was written by Méndez along with Jimmy Jansson and Palle Hammarlund.

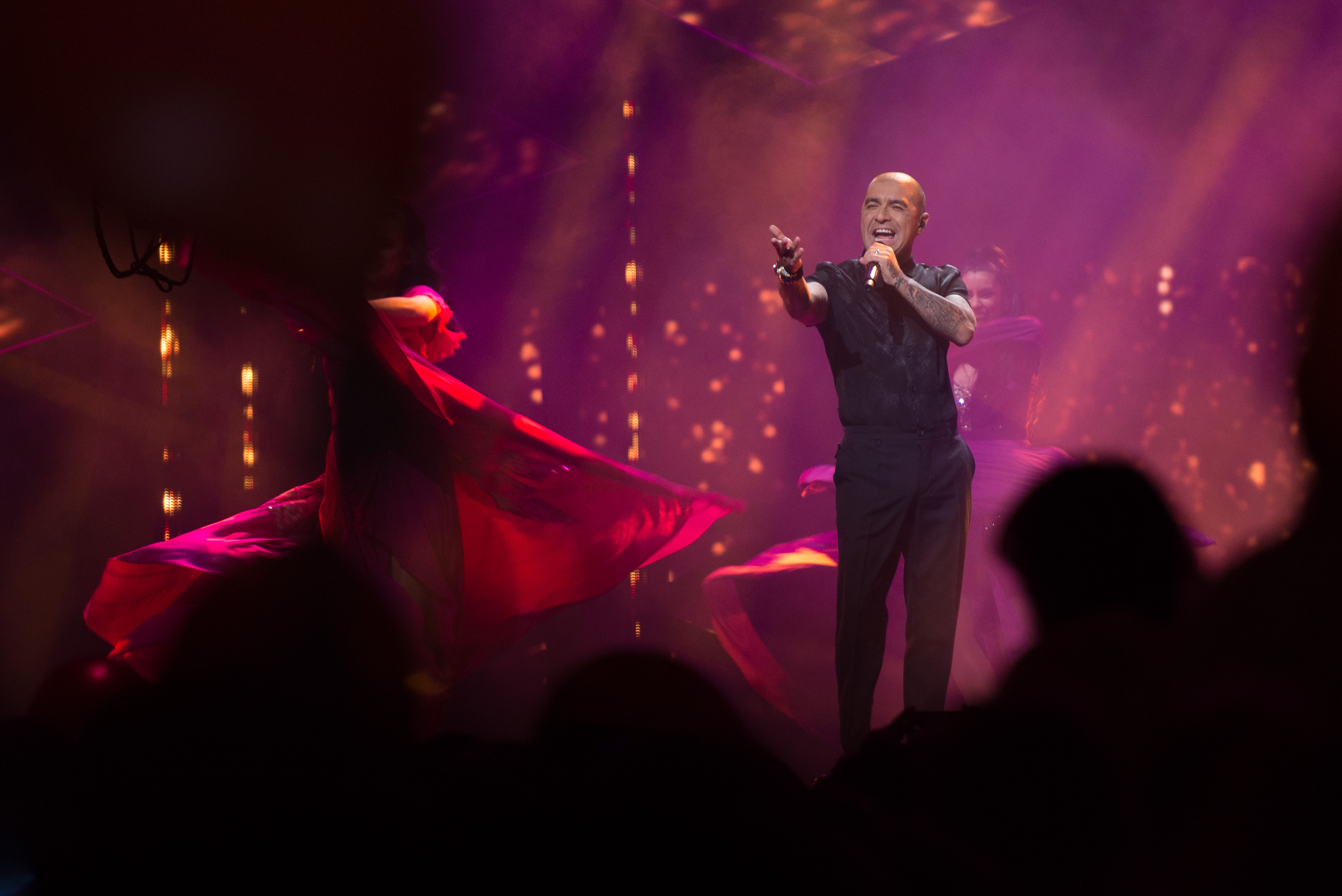
Méndez performing "Everyday" during Melodifestivalen 2018

== Track listing ==
Digital download
No.	Title	Length
1.	"Everyday"	3:05
2.	"Everyday" (Instrumental)	3:07

== Charts ==
=== Weekly charts ===
Chart (2018)	Peak position
Sweden (Sverigetopplistan)	4

=== Year-end charts ===
Chart (2018)	Position
Sweden (Sverigetopplistan)	39

== Release history ==
Region	Date	Format	Label
Various	26 February 2018	Digital download	Universal Music Sweden
