= Rolandz =

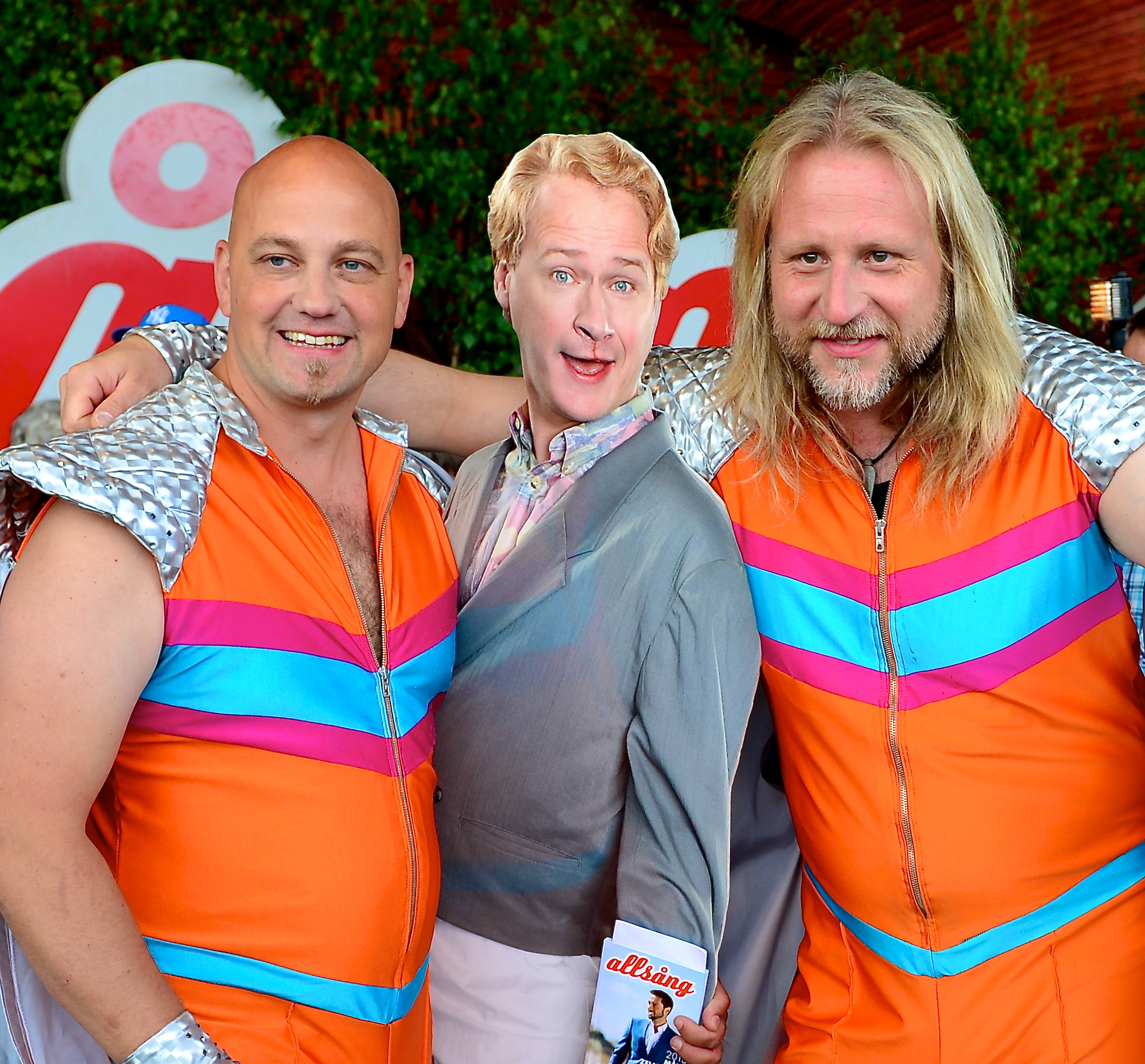

Background information
- Origin: Värmland, Sweden
- Genres: Dansband, comedy
- Years active: 2008-

Rolandz is a dansband from Sweden, established in 2008 by Robert Gustafsson. The breakthrough was during a Dansbandskampen break appearance in 2008. In 2009, the band participated at Allsång på Skansen on 7 July 2009.

Singer and lead man of Rolandz is the character Roland Järverup, whom Robert Gustafsson played in the 1999 movie Screwed in Tallinn by Killinggänget. Later, the idea was hatched to create Rolandz using the Roland Järverup character.

Rolandz competed in Melodifestivalen 2018 with the song Fuldans, and finished in 10th place in the grand final.

== Discography ==
=== Albums ===
Year	Album	Peak positions	Certification
Year	Album	SWE	Certification
2009	Efter regn kommer solsken	3	
2010	Jajamen	1	
2011	Halleluja mamma	6	
2013	Pâ riktigt: Party & Pineappleband	21	
2018	Fuldans... Och hela rubbet	27	

=== Singles ===
Title	Year	Peak chart positions	Album
Title	Year	SWE	Album
"Fuldans"	2018	12	Non-album single

== DVDs ==
- 2009: Rolandz – the Movie
- 2010: Rolandz danzar igen
- 2011: Rolandz – Fadersjakten
