= Martin Almgren =

Swedish singer

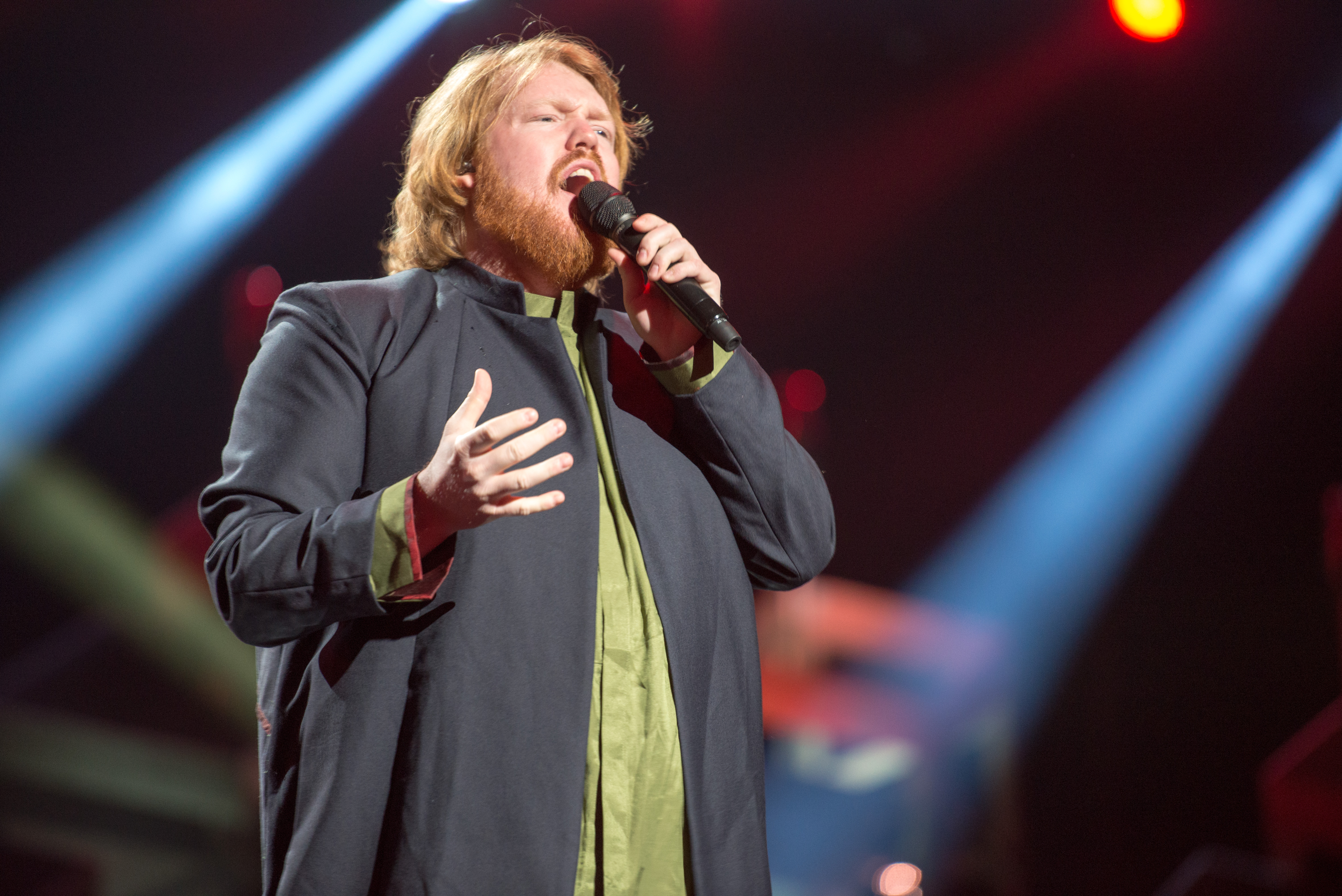
- Martin Almgren at Melodifestivalen 2018

Background information
- Born: Karl Martin Ingemar Almgren; 19 December 1987 (age 38); Lindesbergs församling, Västmanland, Sweden
- Genres: Pop, Country
- Instrument: Vocals
- Years active: 2015–

Karl Martin Ingemar Almgren (born 19 December 1987) is a Swedish singer and winner of Idol 2015 which was broadcast on TV4.

Almgren was born in Lindesberg. He released his debut single Can't Hold Me Down after winning the Globen finale.

He competed in Melodifestivalen 2018 with the song "A Bitter Lullaby", finishing in eighth place in the grand final.

== Discography ==
=== Studio albums ===
Title	Details	Peak chart positions
Title	Details	SWE
Can't Hold Me Down	Released: 11 December 2015; Label: Capitol Music Group; Formats: Digital download, CD	3
Caught Me On a Bad Day	Released: 4 April 2025; Label: Tradehouse Production; Formats: Digital download	—

=== Extended plays ===
Title	Details
Changing Street	Released: 16 June 2017; Label: Capitol Music Group; Formats: Digital download

=== Singles ===
Title	Year	Peak chart positions	Album
Title	Year	SWE	Album
"The Best You Can Is Good Enough"	2015	—	Can't Hold Me Down
"Can't Hold Me Down"	2015	19	Can't Hold Me Down
"Bricks"	2016	—	Non-album singles
"Golden"	2016	—	Non-album singles
"Unbreakable"	2017	—	Non-album singles
"Peaceful Christmas"	2017	—	Non-album singles
"A Bitter Lullaby"	2018	—	Non-album singles
"Home"	2024	—	Non-album singles
"—" denotes a single that did not chart or was not released in that territory.
