= Ida Redig =

Swedish musician and actor (born 1987)

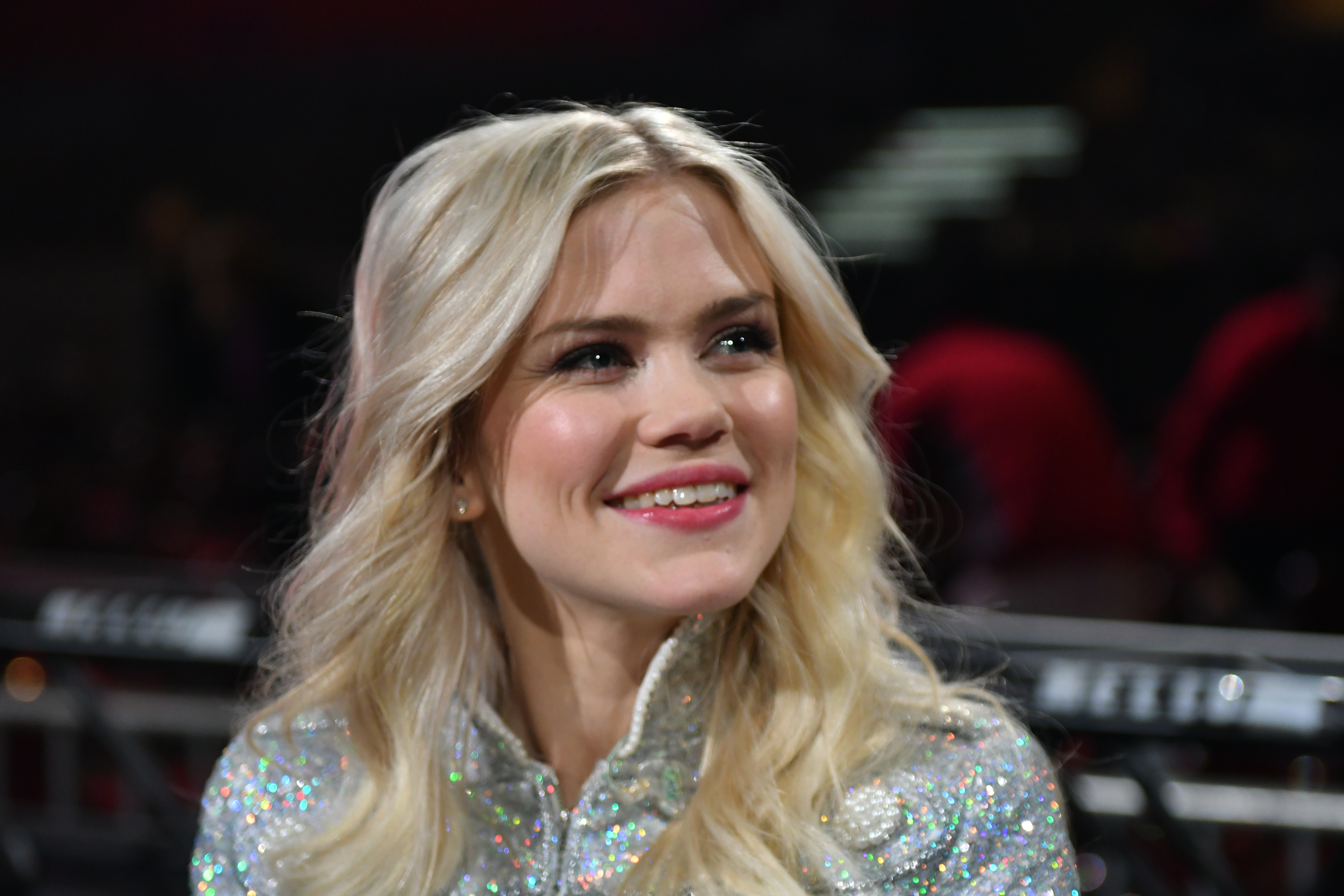
- Ida Redig (2018)

Background information
- Born: Ida Carolina Redig; 10 July 1987 (age 38); Gothenburg, Sweden
- Genres: Pop, Soul
- Occupations: Singer, songwriter

Ida Carolina Redig (born 10 July 1987), also known as Girl, is a Swedish singer, actress, music producer and songwriter. She participated in Melodifestivalen 2018 in the second semi-final with the song "Allting som vi sa", where she placed fifth and got eliminated.

In recent years, Redig has mainly written her lyrics in Swedish. As a music producer, she has, among other things, been nominated for SKAPS' "Music Producer of the Year" award.

== Career ==
In 2007, she had one of the leading roles when she played the character Annica in the Sveriges Television TV-series How Soon Is Now? She released her debut album, Standing Here, with the record label Universal Music Group.

In 2013, she wrote the song "Let's Make Love" and performed "Everywhere" for the film Love and Lemons starring Rakel Wärmländer and Sverrir Gudnason. As Girl she wrote and produced the music and soundtrack for several TV commercials such as McDonald's, BMW, Burger King and Coop along with the soundtrack to Kanal5 TV series Gåsmamman.

She released her second album, Thou Shall Not Be a Pussy, in 2014.

Redig has performed on television shows such as SVT (Det kungliga bröllopet), TV4 (Nyhetsmorgon), SR (Musikhjälpen) and ZTV. She has toured with Marit Bergman.

She participated in Melodifestivalen 2018 in the second semi-final with the song "Allting som vi sa", where she placed fifth and got eliminated.

== Singles ==
Title	Year	Peak chart positions	Album
Title	Year	SWE	Album
"Allting som vi sa"	2018	74	Non-album single
