= Renaida Braun =

Renaida
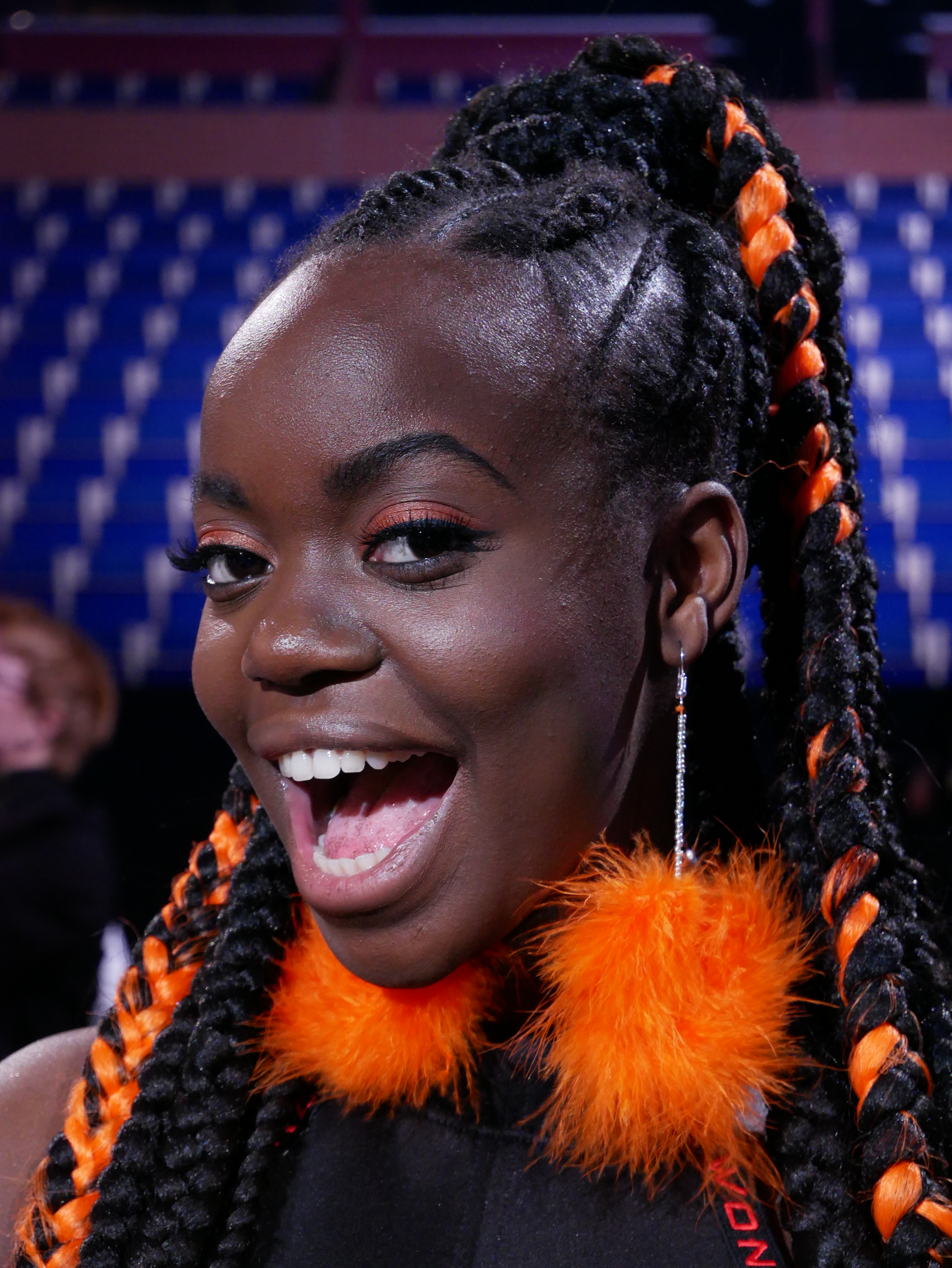
- Renaida at Melodifestivalen 2018

Background information
- Born: Renaida Kebyera Braun; 14 August 1997 (age 29); Dodoma, Tanzania
- Origin: Nyköping, Sweden
- Genres: Pop; soul; dance-pop; hip hop
- Occupation: Singer
- Years active: 2016–present
- Label: Sony Music Sweden

Renaida Kebyera Braun (born 14 August 1997), sometimes known simply as Renaida, is a Swedish singer. She first began her singing career participating in Idol 2016 which was broadcast on TV4, where she placed sixth. Afterwards, she began performing in the musical Aladdin.

Braun competed in Melodifestivalen 2018 with the song "All the Feels", and qualified to Andra Chansen from the first semi-final. She was drawn in a duel with singer Olivia Eliasson for a place in the final, and won, therefore qualifying to the Grand Final, where she finished in ninth place.

In October 2019, Braun revealed that she had been diagnosed with cancer. The following month she stated that her cancer was successfully removed from her neck, and she will not need to undergo any further treatments.

== Singles ==
Title	Year	Peak chart positions	Album
Title	Year	SWE	Album
"All the Feels"	2018	17	Non-album singles
"Loco Notion"	2018	—	Non-album singles
"Waste My Time"	2018	—	Non-album singles
"I Like It"	2019	—	Non-album singles
"Ett andetag i taget"	2020	—	Non-album singles
"Dansant ångestattack"	2020	—	Non-album singles
