= Olivia Eliasson =

Swedish singer (born 1996)

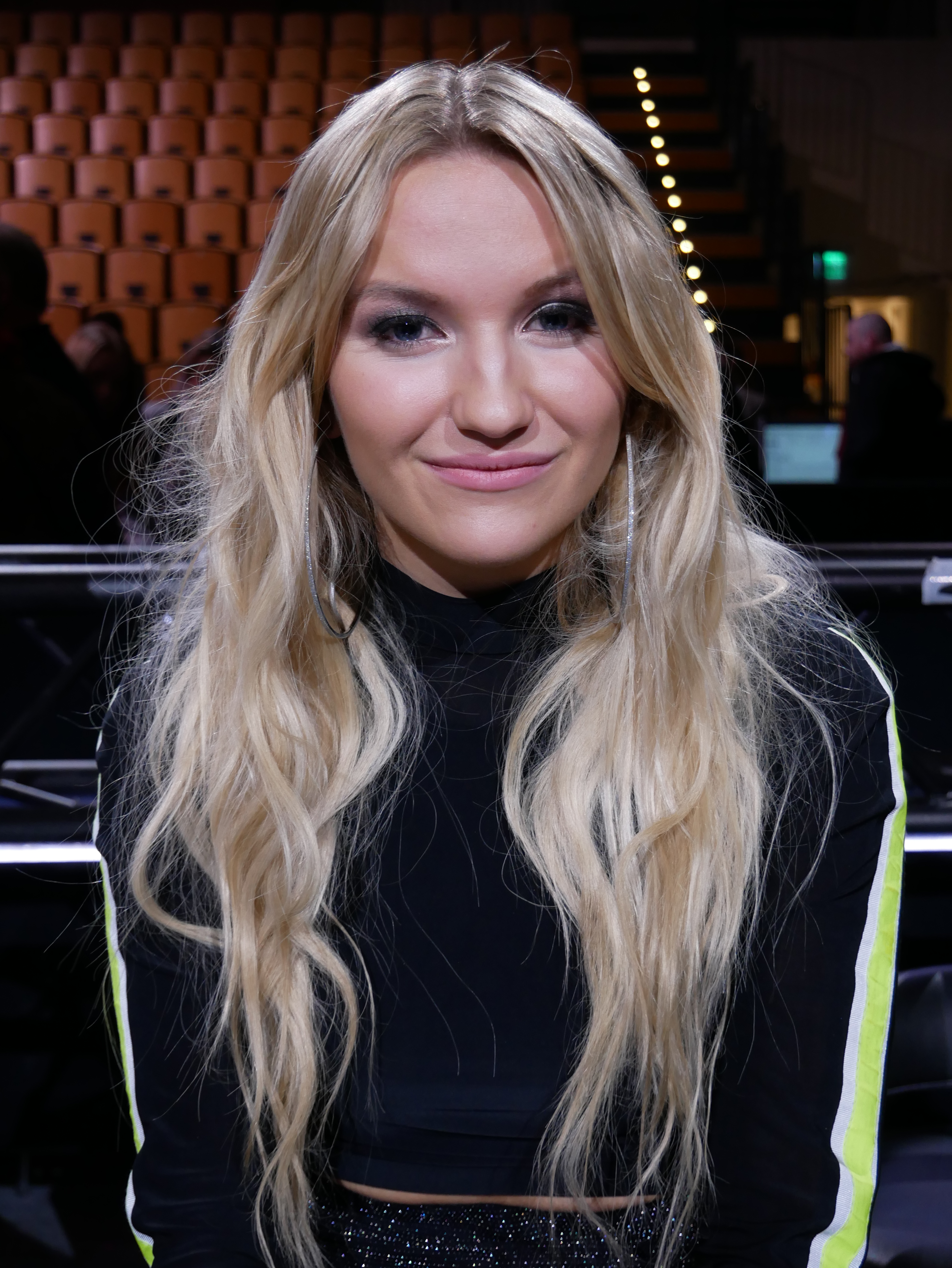
Olivia Eliasson in 2018

Olivia Margareta Eliasson (born 7 June 1996) is a Swedish singer.

Eliasson was discovered when she did a cover of the song "Begging" by singer Anton Ewald and posted it on YouTube. Ewald contacted her after watching the video and they did a duet of the song "Human" together.

Olivia Eliasson competed in Melodifestivalen 2018 with the song ”Never Learn”. In the fourth semifinal she made it to the Second Chance round where she was in a duel and lost to Renaida.

== Discography ==
Albums

Year	Title	Notes
2018	One	

Singles

Year	Title	Notes
2016	Do You	
2018	Never Learn	Peak chart positions is 30
