= Last Breath (Liamoo song) =

Single by Liamoo
- Released: 2018
- Recorded: 2017
- Genre: Pop
- Label: Universal Music Group
- Songwriter(s): Lene Dissing; Peter Bjørnskov; Morten Thorhauge; Liam Cacatian Thomassen
- Producer(s): Morten Thorhauge

Liamoo singles chronology
"It Ain't Easy" (2017)	"Last Breath" (2018)	"Journey" (2018)

"Last Breath" is a song performed by Swedish singer Liamoo. It participated in Melodifestivalen 2018 where it made it to the finals as the second-placed song in Heat 2.

== Charts ==
Chart (2018)	Peak position
Sweden (Sverigetopplistan)	9
