= Melodifestivalen 2018 =

Swedish music competition

Dates and venue
- Heat 1: 3 February 2018
- Heat 2: 10 February 2018
- Heat 3: 17 February 2018
- Heat 4: 24 February 2018
- Second chance: 3 March 2018
- Final: 10 March 2018

Production
- Broadcaster: Sveriges Television (SVT)
- Director: Robin Hofwander; Fredrik Bäcklund
- Presenters: David Lindgren; Fab Freddie

Participants
- Number of entries: 28
- Number of finalists: 12

Vote
- Winning song: "Dance You Off" by Benjamin Ingrosso

Melodifestivalen 2018 was the 58th edition of the Swedish music competition Melodifestivalen, which selected Sweden's entry for the Eurovision Song Contest 2018. The competition was organised by Sveriges Television (SVT) and took place over a six-week from 3 February to 10 March 2018.

The format of the competition consists of 6 shows: 4 heat rounds, a second chance round and a final. An initial 28 entries were selected for the competition through three methods: an open call for song submissions, direct invitations to specific artists and songwriters and a wildcard given to one of the artists that participated in the Svensktoppen nästa competition organised by Sveriges Radio P4. The 28 competing entries were divided into four heats, with seven compositions in each. From each heat, the songs that earned first and second place qualified directly to the final, while the songs that placed third and fourth proceeded to the Second Chance round. The bottom three songs in each heat were eliminated from the competition. An additional four entries qualified from the Second Chance round to the final, bringing the total number of competing entries in the final to 12. All 6 shows were hosted by David Lindgren and Fredrik Svensson, known as Fab Freddie.

The winner of the competition was Benjamin Ingrosso with the song "Dance You Off." He represented Sweden at the Eurovision Song Contest 2018 which was held in Lisbon, Portugal, where he came seventh with 274 points.

== Format ==
Melodifestivalen 2018, organised by Sveriges Television (SVT), was the seventeenth consecutive edition of the contest in which the competition took place in different cities across Sweden. The four heats were held at the Löfbergs Arena in Karlstad (3 February), the Scandinavium in Gothenburg (10 February), the Malmö Arena in Malmö (17 February) and the Fjällräven Center in Örnsköldsvik (24 February). The Second Chance round took place at the Kristianstad Arena in Kristianstad on 3 March while the final was held at the Friends Arena in Stockholm on 10 March. An initial 28 entries competed in the heats, with seven entries taking part in each show. The top two entries from each heat advanced directly to the final, while the third and fourth placed entries advanced to the Second Chance round. The bottom three entries in each heat were eliminated. An additional four entries qualified for the final from the Second Chance round, bringing the total number of competing entries in the final to 12.

Competition Schedule
Show	Date	City	Venue
Heat 1	3 February 2018	Karlstad	Löfbergs Arena
Heat 2	10 February 2018	Gothenburg	Scandinavium
Heat 3	17 February 2018	Malmö	Malmö Arena
Heat 4	24 February 2018	Örnsköldsvik	Fjällräven Center
Second Chance	3 March 2018	Kristianstad	Kristianstad Arena
Final	10 March 2018	Stockholm	Friends Arena

=== Presenters ===
In October 2017, it was speculated by Swedish tabloid Aftonbladet that former Melodifestivalen contestant and host David Lindgren would be one of the presenters of this year's competition. On 2 November 2017, SVT confirmed that Lindgren would be the host of the competition. Lindgren hosted the competition in 2017, having previously also competed as an artist in 2012, 2013 and 2016.

== Competing entries ==
The twenty-eight competing entries were announced to the public during a press conference on 28 November 2017.

Artist	Song	Songwriter(s)
Barbi Escobar	"Stark"	Barbi Escobar, Costa Leon, Andreas ”Stone” Johansson
Benjamin Ingrosso	"Dance You Off"	Benjamin Ingrosso, MAG, Louis Schoorl, K Nita
Dotter	"Cry"	Linnea Deb, Peter Boström, Thomas G:son, Johanna ”Dotter” Jansson
Edward Blom	"Livet på en pinne"	Edward Blom, Thomas G:son, Stefan Brunzell, Kent Olsson
Elias Abbas	"Mitt paradis"	Anderz Wrethov, Hamed “K-One” Pirouzpanah, Sami Rekik
Emmi Christensson	"Icarus"	Thomas G:son, Christian Schneider, Andreas Hedlund
Felicia Olsson	"Break That Chain"	Bobby Ljunggren, Kristian Lagerström, Joy Deb, Henrik Wikström
Felix Sandman	"Every Single Day"	Noah Conrad, Parker James, Jake Torry, Felix Sandman
Ida Redig	"Allting som vi sa"	Yvonne Dahlbom, Jesper Welander, Ida Redig
Jessica Andersson	"Party Voice"	Fredrik Kempe, David Kreuger, Niklas Carson Mattsson, Jessica Andersson
John Lundvik	"My Turn"	Anna-Klara Folin, John Lundvik, Jonas Thander
Jonas Gardell	"Det finns en väg"	Calle Kindbom, Jonas Gardell, Mats Tärnfors
Kalle Moraeus & Orsa Spelmän	"Min dröm"	Thomas G:son, Alexzandra Wickman
Kamferdrops	"Solen lever kvar hos dig"	Herbert Trus, Danne Attlerud, Martin Klaman, Krstoffer Tømmerbakke, Erik Smaaland, Kamferdrops
Kikki Danielsson	"Osby Tennessee"	Sulo Karlsson, Kikki Danielsson
Liamoo	"Last Breath"	Liam Cacatian Thomassen, Morten Thorhauge, Peter Bjørnskov, Lene Dissing
Margaret	"In My Cabana"	Anderz Wrethov, Linnea Deb, Arash Labaf, Robert Uhlmann
Mariette	"For You"	Jörgen Elofsson
Martin Almgren	"A Bitter Lullaby"	Josefin Glenmark, Märta Grauers
Méndez	"Everyday"	Leopoldo Mendez, Jimmy Jansson, Palle Hammarlund
Mimi Werner	"Songburning"	Göran Werner, Mimi Werner, Niki Niki, Carl Varga, Johan Åsgärde, Oliver Lundström
Moncho	"Cuba Libre"	Jimmy Jansson, David Strääf, Markus Videsäter, Axel Schylström, Moncho
Olivia Eliasson	"Never Learn"	Anton Ewald, Jonas Wallin, Astrid S
Renaida	"All the Feels"	Laurell Barker, Jon Hällgren, Peter Barringer, Lukas Hällgren
Rolandz	"Fuldans"	Fredrik Kempe, Robert Gustafsson, Regina Hedman
Samir & Viktor	"Shuffla"	Andreas ”Stone” Johansson, Denniz Jamm, Costa Leon, Samir Badran, Viktor Frisk
Sigrid Bernson	"Patrick Swayze"	Andrej Kamnik, Josefin Glenmark, Peg Parnevik, Sigrid Bernson
Stiko Per Larsson	"Titta vi flyger"	Stiko Per Larsson, Emil Rotsjö

== Heats ==
As in previous years, Melodifestivalen commenced with four heats, which determined the eight entries that advanced directly to the final and the eight entries that qualified to the Second Chance round.

=== Heat 1 ===
The first heat took place on 3 February 2018 at the Löfbergs Arena in Karlstad. A total of 6,617,451 votes were cast throughout the show with a total of 452,906 SEK collected for Radiohjälpen.

R/O	Artist	Song	Votes				Place	Result
R/O	Artist	Song	Round 1	Round 2	Total	%	Place	Result
1	Sigrid Bernson	"Patrick Swayze"	951,260	92,476	1,043,736	15.83%	4	Second chance
2	John Lundvik	"My Turn"	1,048,501	103,632	1,152,133	17.47%	2	Final
3	Renaida	"All the Feels"	1,037,549	89,358	1,126,907	17.09%	3	Second chance
4	Edward Blom	"Livet på en pinne"	801,616	63,826	865,442	13.12%	5	Out
5	Kikki Danielsson	"Osby Tennessee"	555,466	—N/a	555,466	8.42%	7	Out
6	Kamferdrops	"Solen lever kvar hos dig"	555,778	—N/a	555,778	8.43%	6	Out
7	Benjamin Ingrosso	"Dance You Off"	1,184,738	110,417	1,295,155	19.64%	1	Final

=== Heat 2 ===
The second heat took place on 10 February 2018 at the Scandinavium arena in Gothenburg. A total of 5,880,237 votes were cast throughout the show with a total of 396,252 SEK collected for Radiohjälpen. Singer Petra Marklund, also known as September performed a cover of Lill-Babs's En tuff brud i lyxförpackning.

R/O	Artist	Song	Votes				Place	Result
R/O	Artist	Song	Round 1	Round 2	Total	%	Place	Result
1	Samir & Viktor	"Shuffla"	1,166,434	70,629	1,237,063	21.09%	1	Final
2	Ida Redig	"Allting som vi sa"	721,817	57,707	779,524	13.29%	5	Out
3	Jonas Gardell	"Det finns en väg"	490,911	—	490,911	8.37%	7	Out
4	Margaret	"In My Cabana"	805,016	60,198	865,214	14.75%	3	Second chance
5	Stiko Per Larsson	"Titta vi flyger"	529,194	—	529,194	9.02%	6	Out
6	Mimi Werner	"Songburning"	744,801	67,923	812,724	13.86%	4	Second chance
7	Liamoo	"Last Breath"	1,051,127	100,136	1,151,263	19.63%	2	Final

=== Heat 3 ===
The third heat took place on 17 February 2018 at the Malmö Arena in Malmö. A total of 4,800,971 votes were cast throughout the show with a total of 432,824 SEK collected for Radiohjälpen.

R/O	Artist	Song	Votes				Place	Result
R/O	Artist	Song	Round 1	Round 2	Total	%	Place	Result
1	Martin Almgren	"A Bitter Lullaby"	850,684	93,848	944,532	19.76%	1	Final
2	Barbi Escobar	"Stark"	426,768	—	426,768	8.93%	7	Out
3	Moncho	"Cuba Libre"	569,210	46,859	616,069	12.89%	4	Second chance
4	Jessica Andersson	"Party Voice"	788,787	102,041	890,828	18.64%	2	Final
5	Kalle Moraeus & Orsa Spelmän	"Min dröm"	537,891	58,589	596,480	12.48%	5	Out
6	Dotter	"Cry"	511,718	—	511,718	10.71%	6	Out
7	Méndez	"Everyday"	701,557	91,553	793,110	16.59%	3	Second chance

=== Heat 4 ===
The fourth heat took place on 24 February 2018 at Fjällräven Center in Örnsköldsvik. A total of 4,866,749 votes were cast throughout the show with a total of 385,483 SEK collected for Radiohjälpen.

R/O	Artist	Song	Votes				Place	Result
R/O	Artist	Song	Round 1	Round 2	Total	%	Place	Result
1	Emmi Christensson	"Icarus"	541,494	—	541,494	11.15%	6	Out
2	Elias Abbas	"Mitt paradis"	605,644	39,845	645,489	13.30%	5	Out
3	Felicia Olsson	"Break That Chain"	536,504	—	536,504	11.05%	7	Out
4	Rolandz	"Fuldans"	737,996	80,005	818,001	16.85%	2	Final
5	Olivia Eliasson	"Never Learn"	601,932	46,425	648,357	13.36%	4	Second chance
6	Felix Sandman	"Every Single Day"	693,167	70,118	763,285	15.72%	3	Second chance
7	Mariette	"For You"	816,976	84,609	901,585	18.57%	1	Final

== Second Chance round ==
The Second Chance round took place on 3 March 2018 at the Kristianstad Arena in Kristianstad. A total of 6,007,515 votes were cast throughout the show with a total of 346,287 SEK collected for Radiohjälpen.

Duel	R/O	Artist	Song	Votes	%	Result
I	1	Margaret	"In My Cabana"	877,351	59.27%	Final
I	2	Moncho	"Cuba Libre"	602,941	40.73%	Out
II	1	Renaida	"All the Feels"	884,188	56.43%	Final
II	2	Olivia Eliasson	"Never Learn"	682,801	43.57%	Out
III	1	Felix Sandman	"Every Single Day"	868,152	59.81%	Final
III	2	Mimi Werner	"Songburning"	583,305	40.19%	Out
IV	1	Sigrid Bernson	"Patrick Swayze"	741,226	49.13%	Out
IV	2	Méndez	"Everyday"	767,551	50.87%	Final

== Final ==
The Final took place on 10 March 2018 at the Friends Arena in Stockholm. A total of 13,993,975 votes were cast throughout the show with a total of 1,965,599 SEK collected for Radiohjälpen.

R/O	Artist	Song	Juries	Televote/SMS/App			Total	Place
R/O	Artist	Song	Juries	Votes	Percentage	Points	Total	Place
1	Méndez	"Everyday"	2	1,351,896	9.7%	62	64	12
2 (Note: Renaida was given a second chance to perform after Rolandz due to an earpiece malfunction during her original performance.)	Renaida	"All the Feels"	30	1,116,740	8.0%	51	81	9
3	Martin Almgren	"A Bitter Lullaby"	43	899,049	6.4%	41	84	8
4	John Lundvik	"My Turn"	66	1,349,766	9.6%	62	128	3
5	Jessica Andersson	"Party Voice"	33	809,292	5.8%	37	70	11
6	Liamoo	"Last Breath"	52	1,171,247	8.4%	53	105	6
7	Samir & Viktor	"Shuffla"	54	1,314,016	9.4%	60	114	4
8	Mariette	"For You"	64	1,080,546	7.7%	49	113	5
9	Felix Sandman	"Every Single Day"	94	1,401,767	10.0%	64	158	2
10	Margaret	"In My Cabana"	62	904,893	6.5%	41	103	7
11	Benjamin Ingrosso	"Dance You Off"	114	1,469,808	10.5%	67	181	1
12	Rolandz	"Fuldans"	24	1,124,955	8.0%	51	75	10

Detailed International Jury Votes
R/O	Song	Poland	Albania	Iceland	Italy	Cyprus	Australia	Georgia	United Kingdom	Armenia	France	Portugal	Total
R/O	Song	Poland	Albania	Iceland	Italy	Cyprus	Australia	Georgia	United Kingdom	Armenia	France	Portugal	Total
1	"Everyday"						1				1		2
2	"All the Feels"	3				2	6			8	8	3	30
3	"A Bitter Lullaby"	2	8	3	2		7	6	6	1	6	2	43
4	"My Turn"	7	3	8	6	4	8	10	10	5	4	1	66
5	"Party Voice"	1	5	1	7	3	3	4	3			6	33
6	"Last Breath"	8	4	4	1	5	2	2	5	7	7	7	52
7	"Shuffla"	5	6	5	10	6		1	12	4		5	54
8	"For You"	4	7	6	5	8	5	7	2	10	2	8	64
9	"Every Single Day"	6	1	12	8	10	10	12	7	6	12	10	94
10	"In My Cabana"	12	10	7	3	7		5	8	3	3	4	62
11	"Dance You Off"	10	12	10	12	12	12	8	4	12	10	12	114
12	"Fuldans"		2	2	4	1	4	3	1	2	5		24
International Jury Spokespersons
Poland – Mateusz Grzesiński; Albania – Kleart Duraj; Iceland – Felix Bergsson; Italy – Nicola Caligiore; Cyprus – Klitos Klitou; Australia – Stephanie Werrett; Georgia – Nodiko Tatishvili; United Kingdom – Simon Proctor; Armenia – Anush Ter-Ghukasyan; France – Bruno Berberes; Portugal – Gonçalo Madail

== Gallery ==
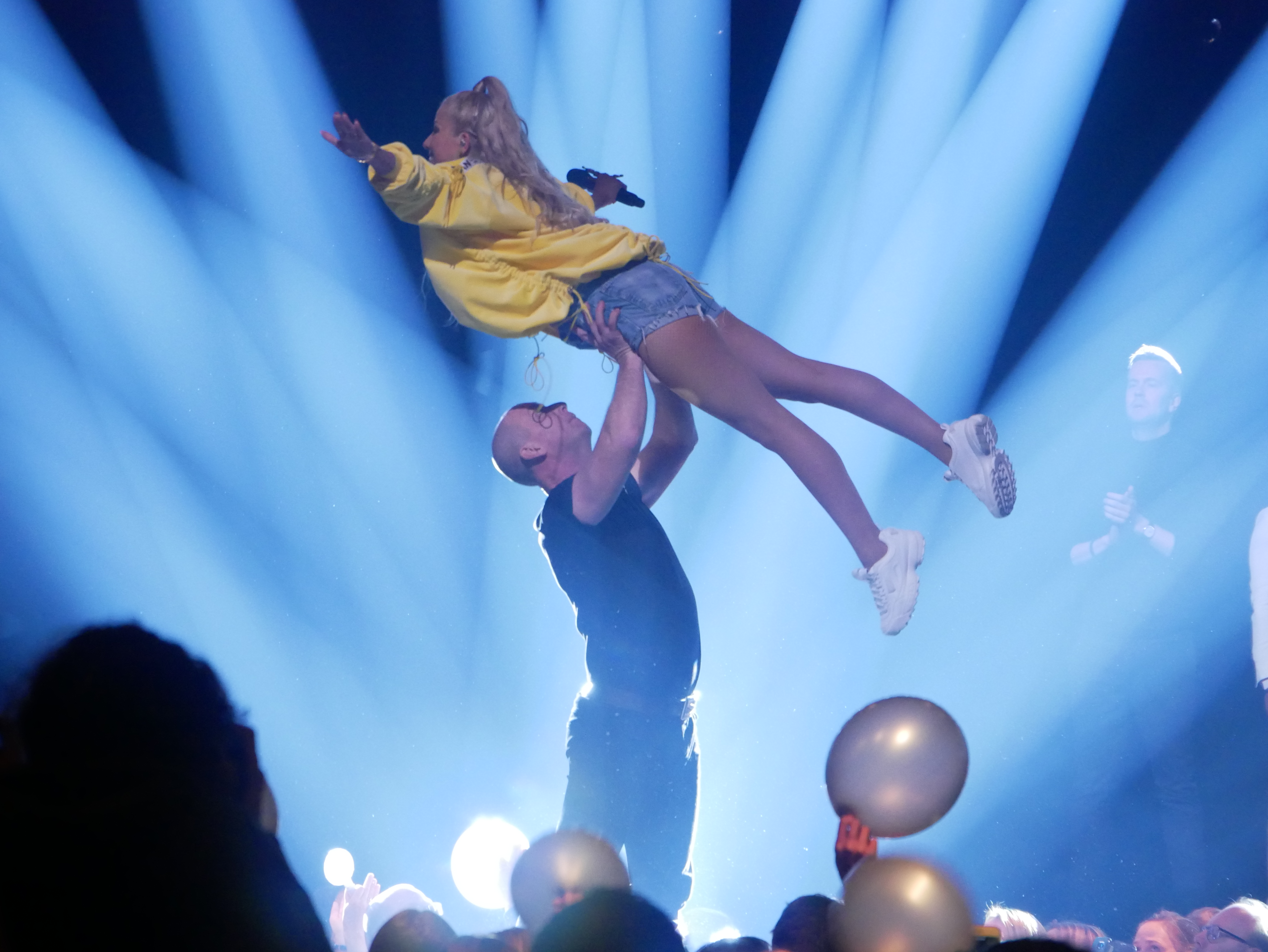
Sigrid Bernson - Patrick Swayze

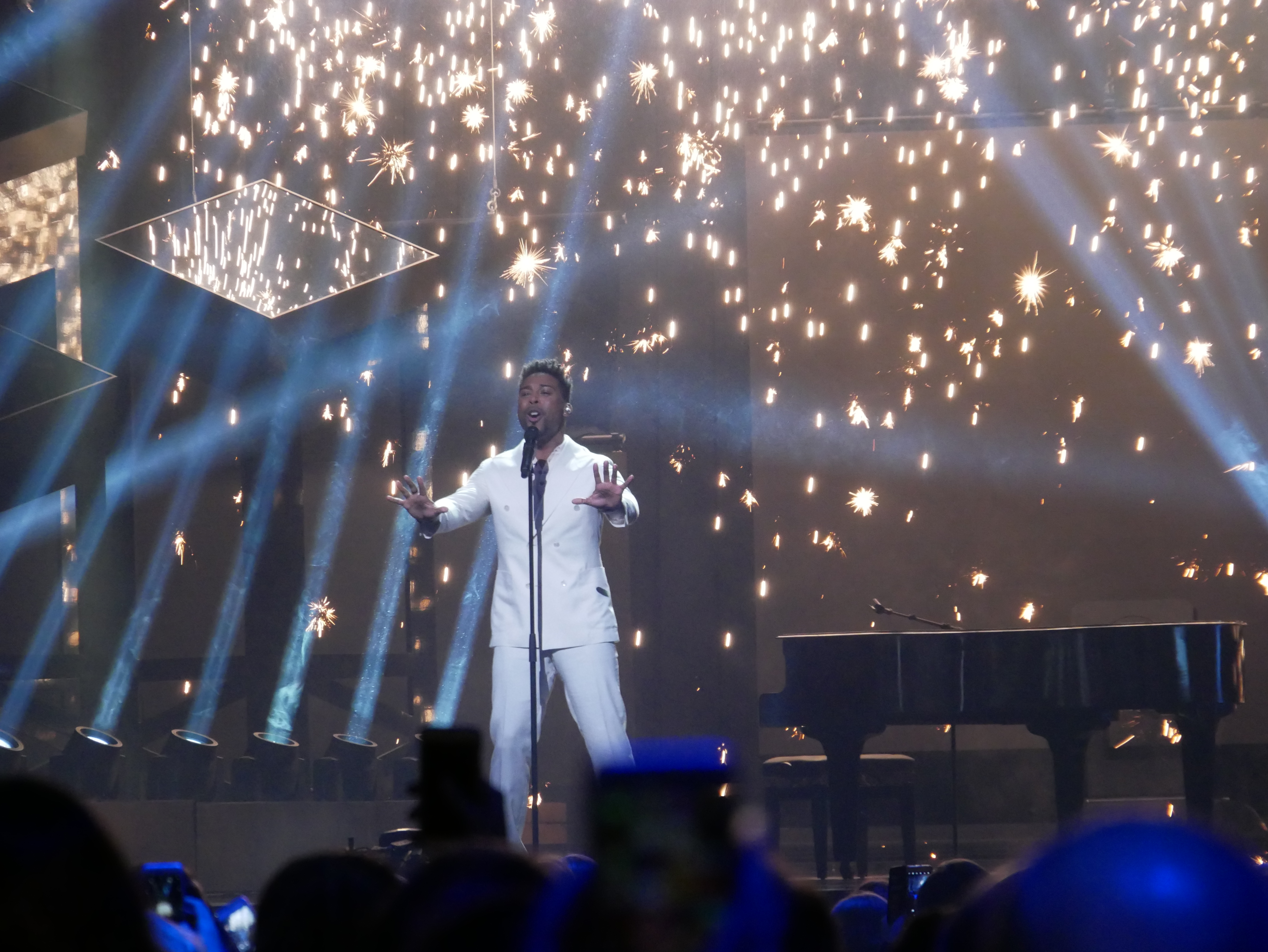
John Lundvik - My Turn

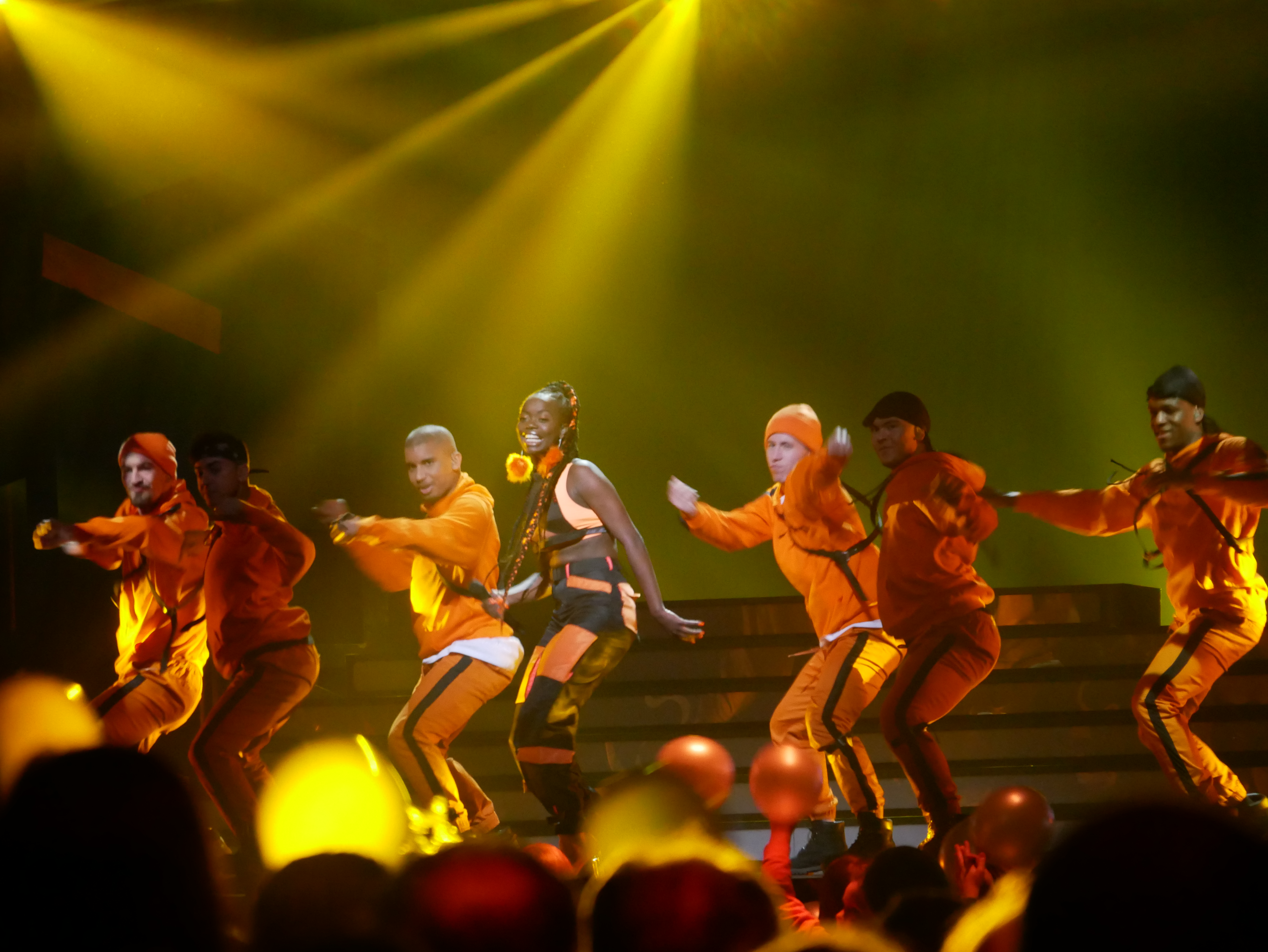
Renaida - All the Feels

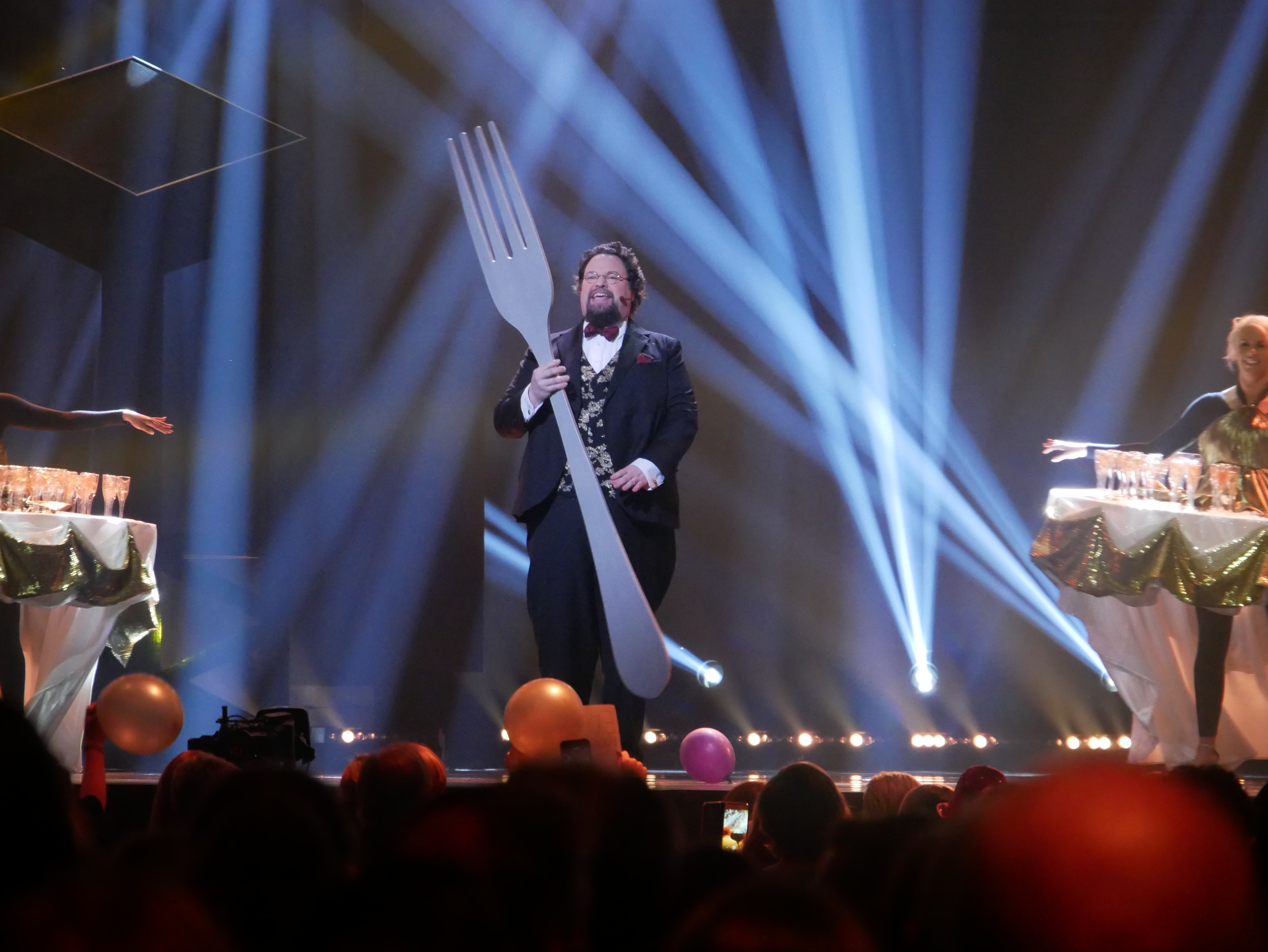
Edward Blom - Livet på en pinne

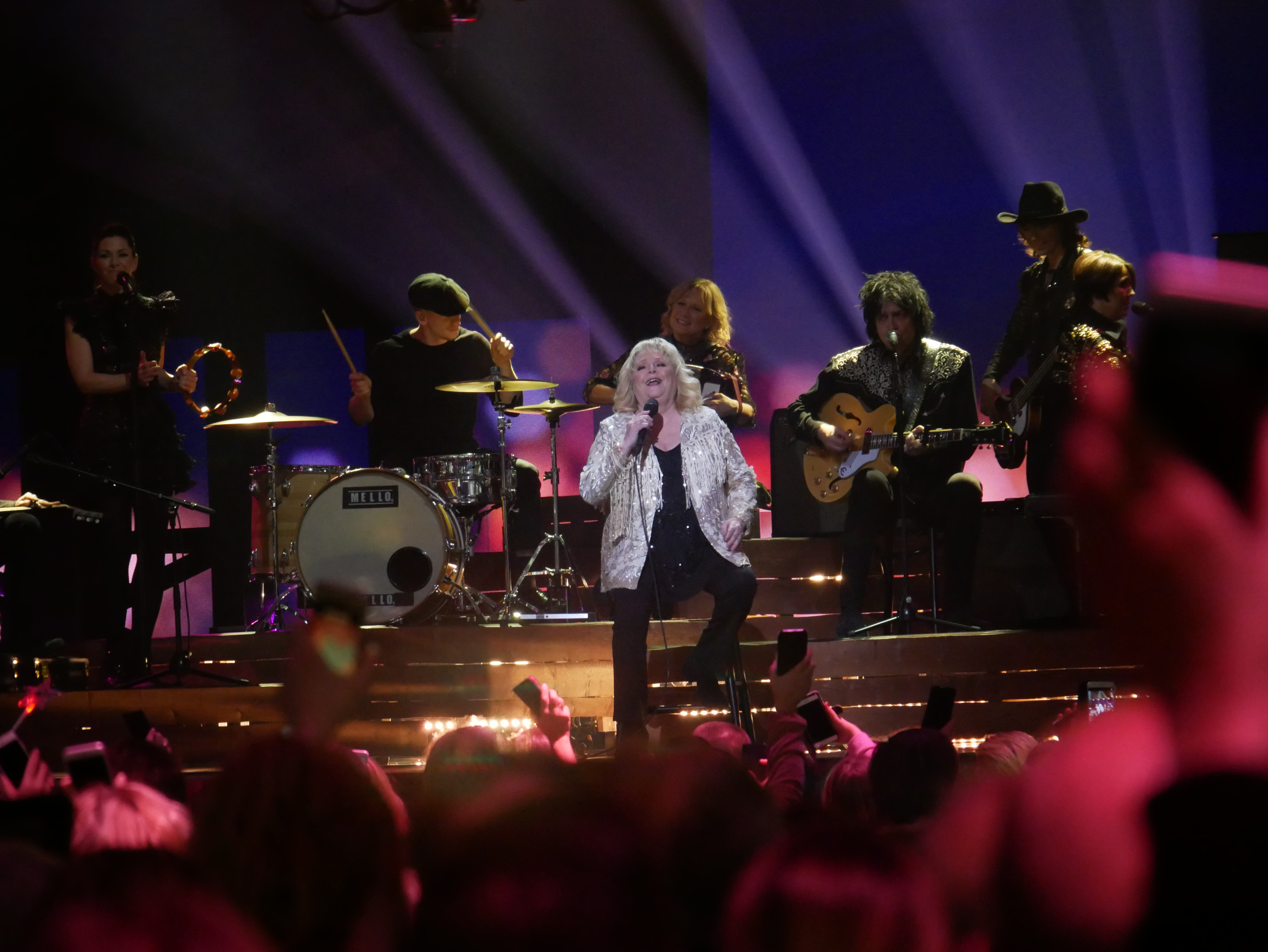
Kikki Danielsson - Osby Tennessee

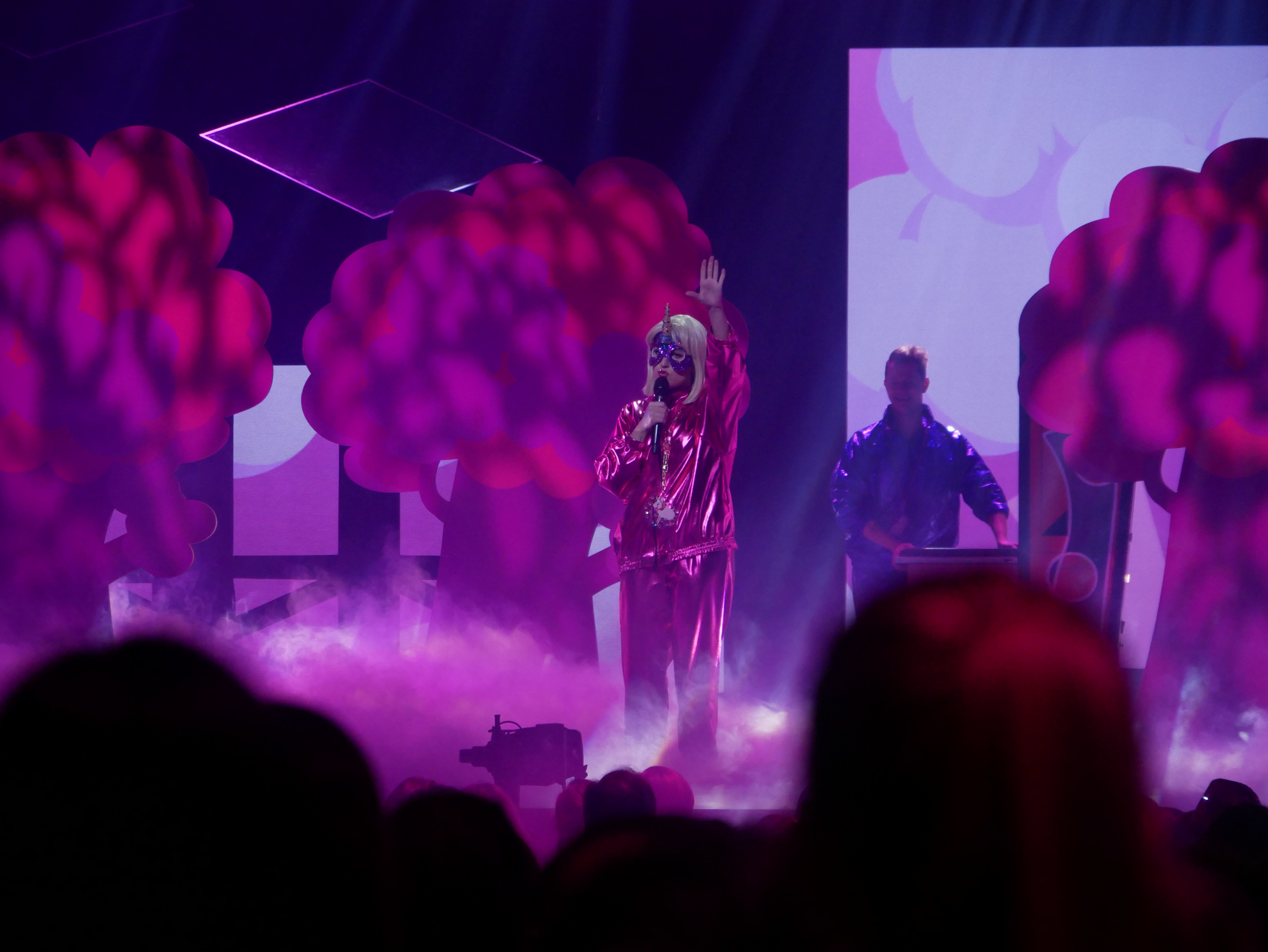
Kamferdrops - Solen lever kvar hos dig

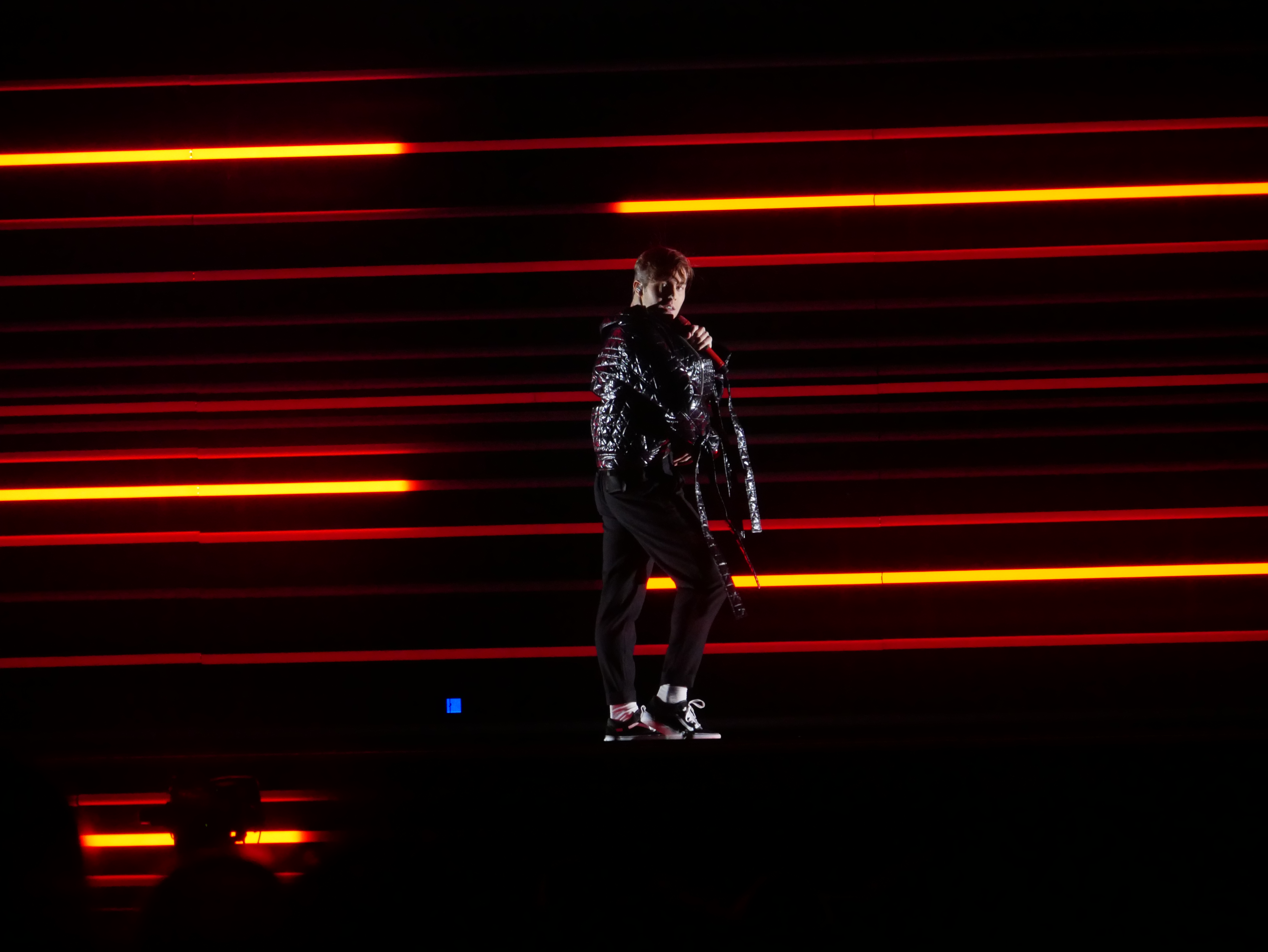
Benjamin Ingrosso - Dance You Off

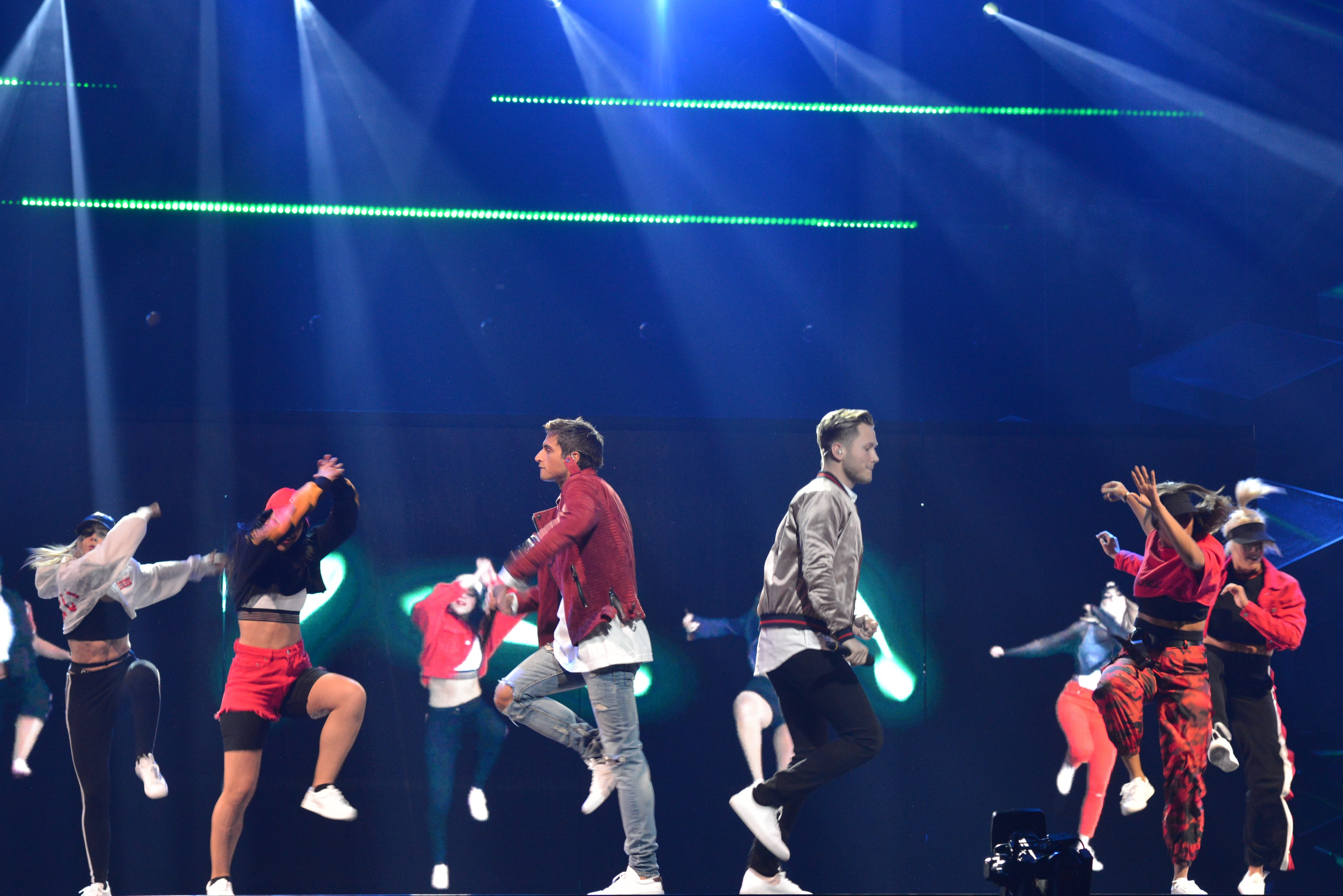
Samir & Viktor - Shuffla

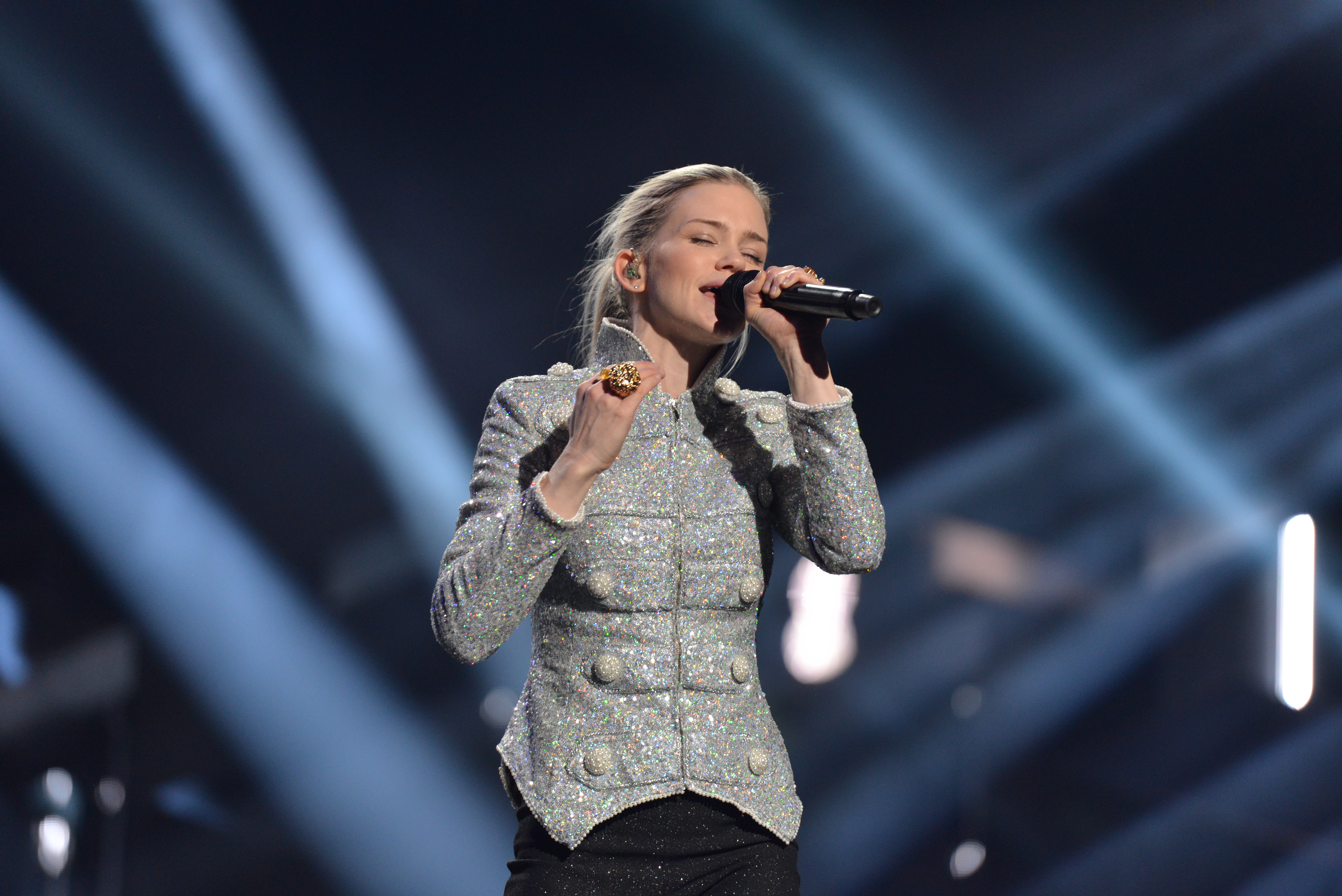
Ida Redig - Allting som vi sa

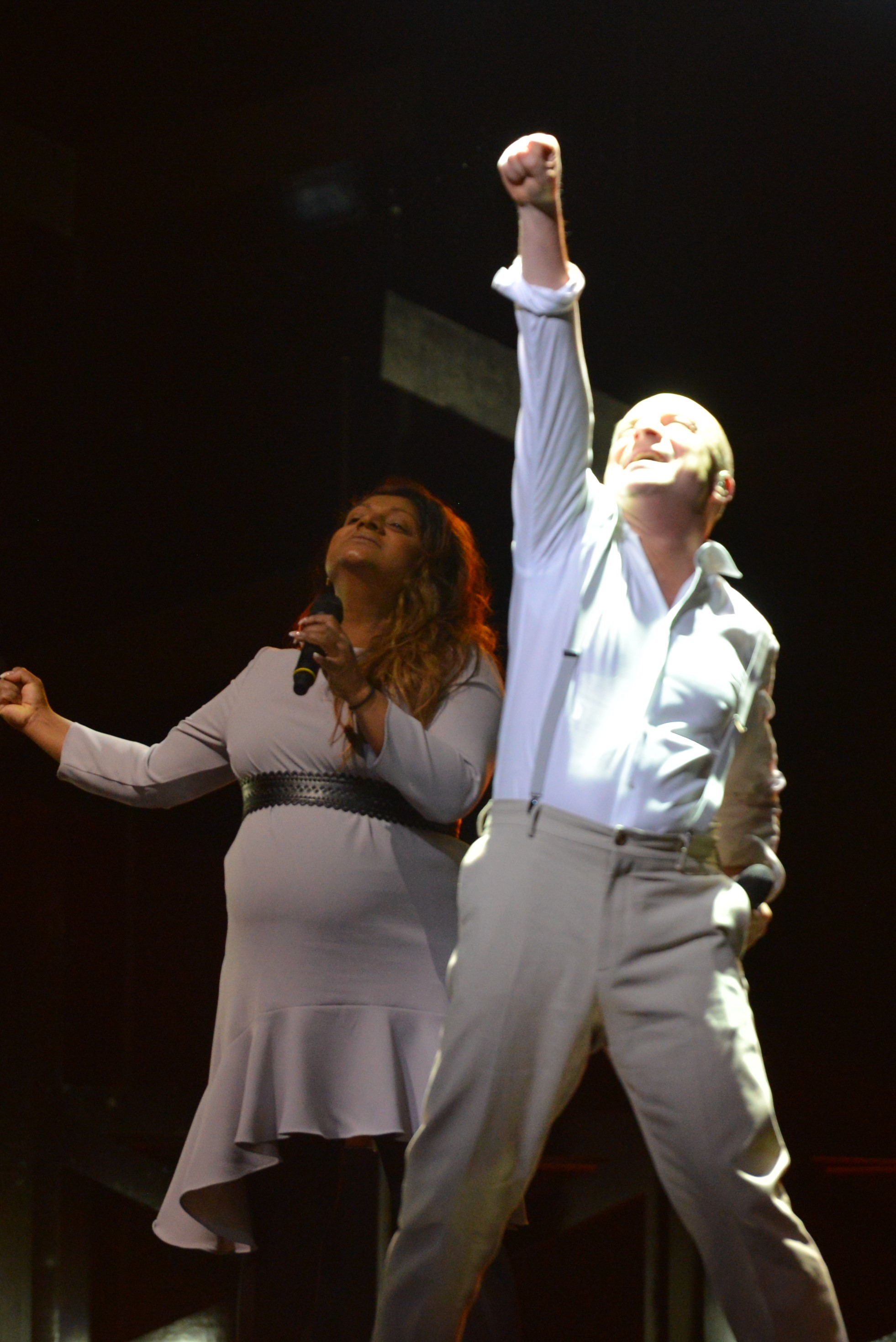
Jonas Gardell - Det finns en väg

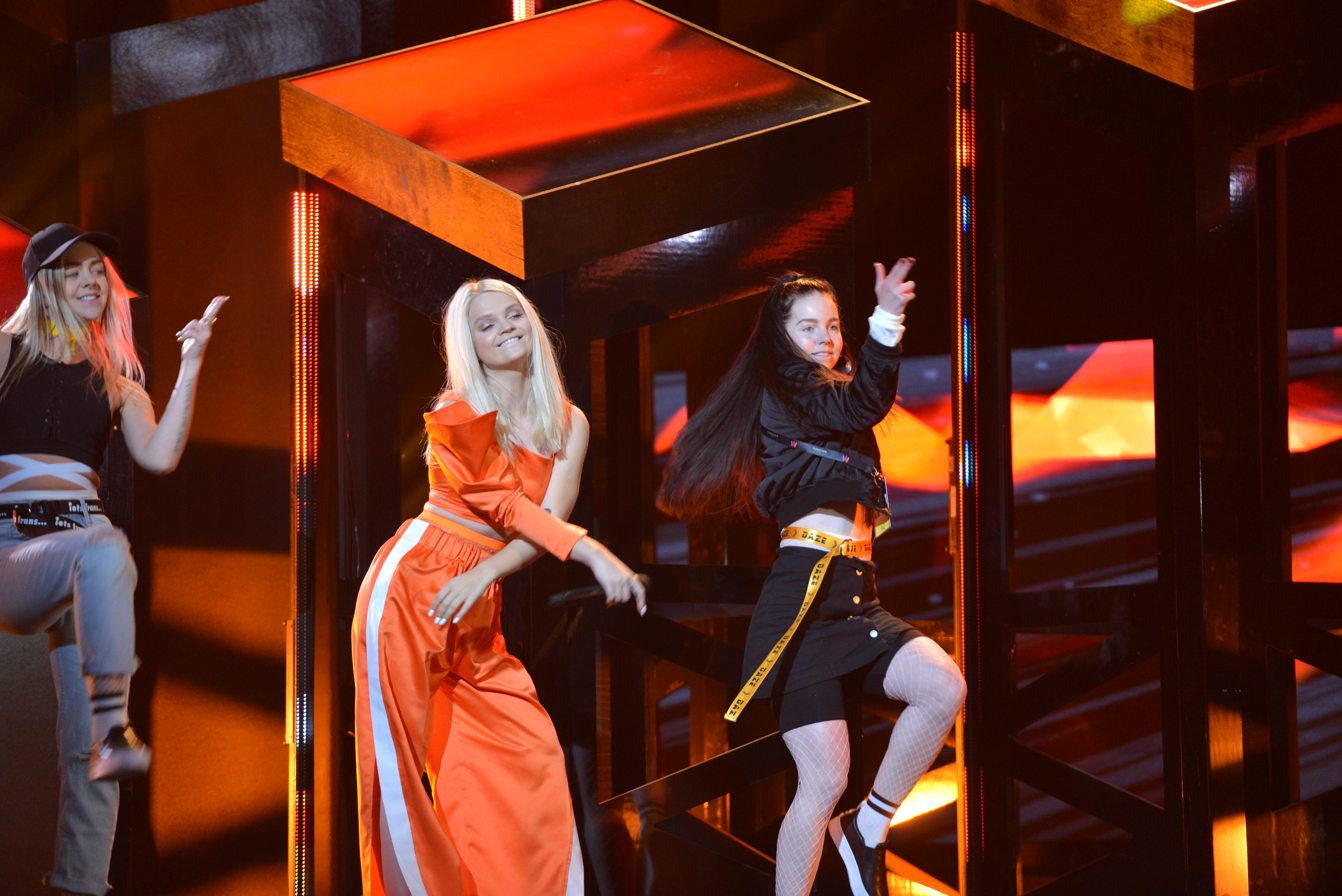
Margaret - In My Cabana

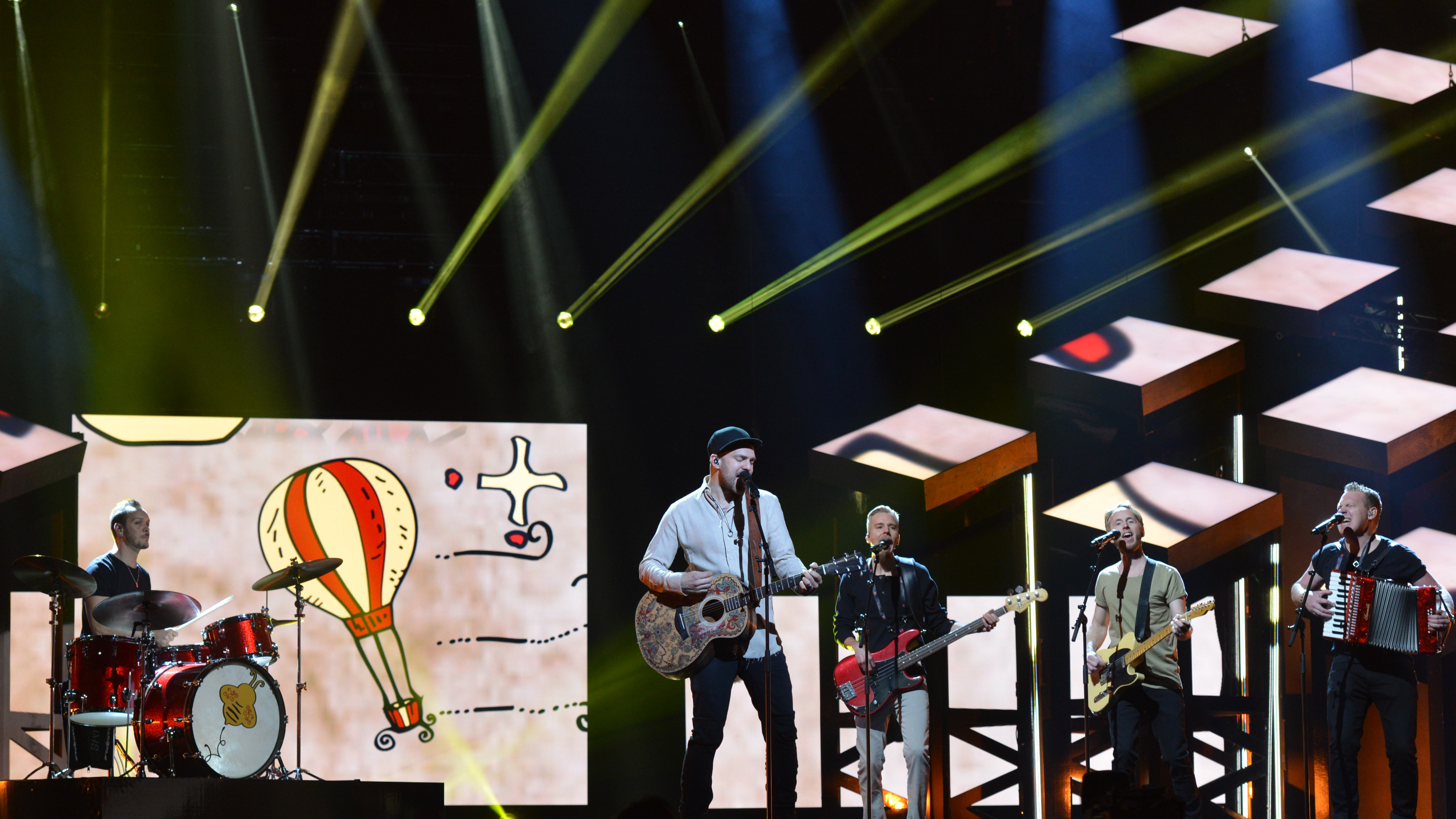
Stiko Per Larsson - Titta vi flyger

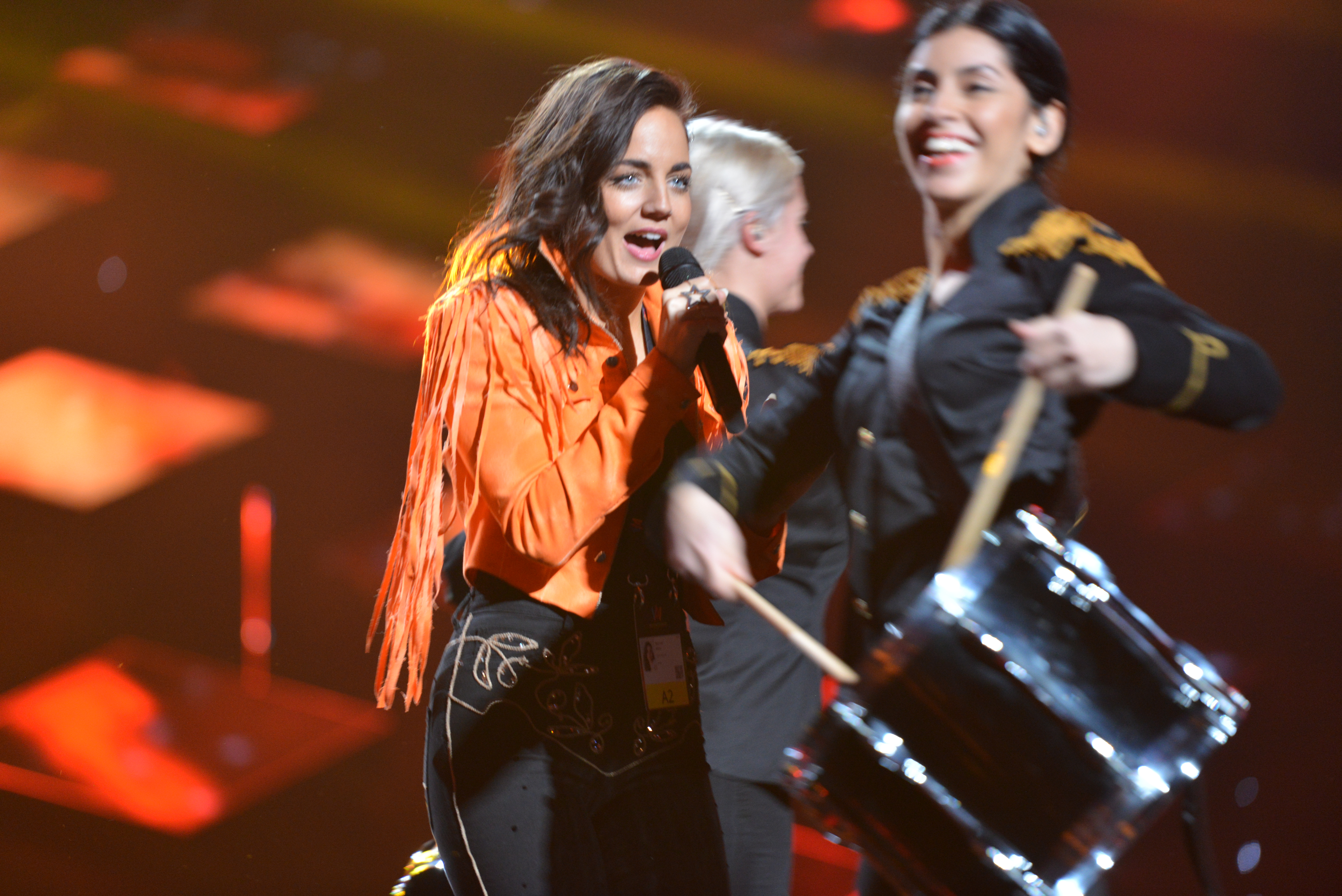
Mimi Werner - Songburning

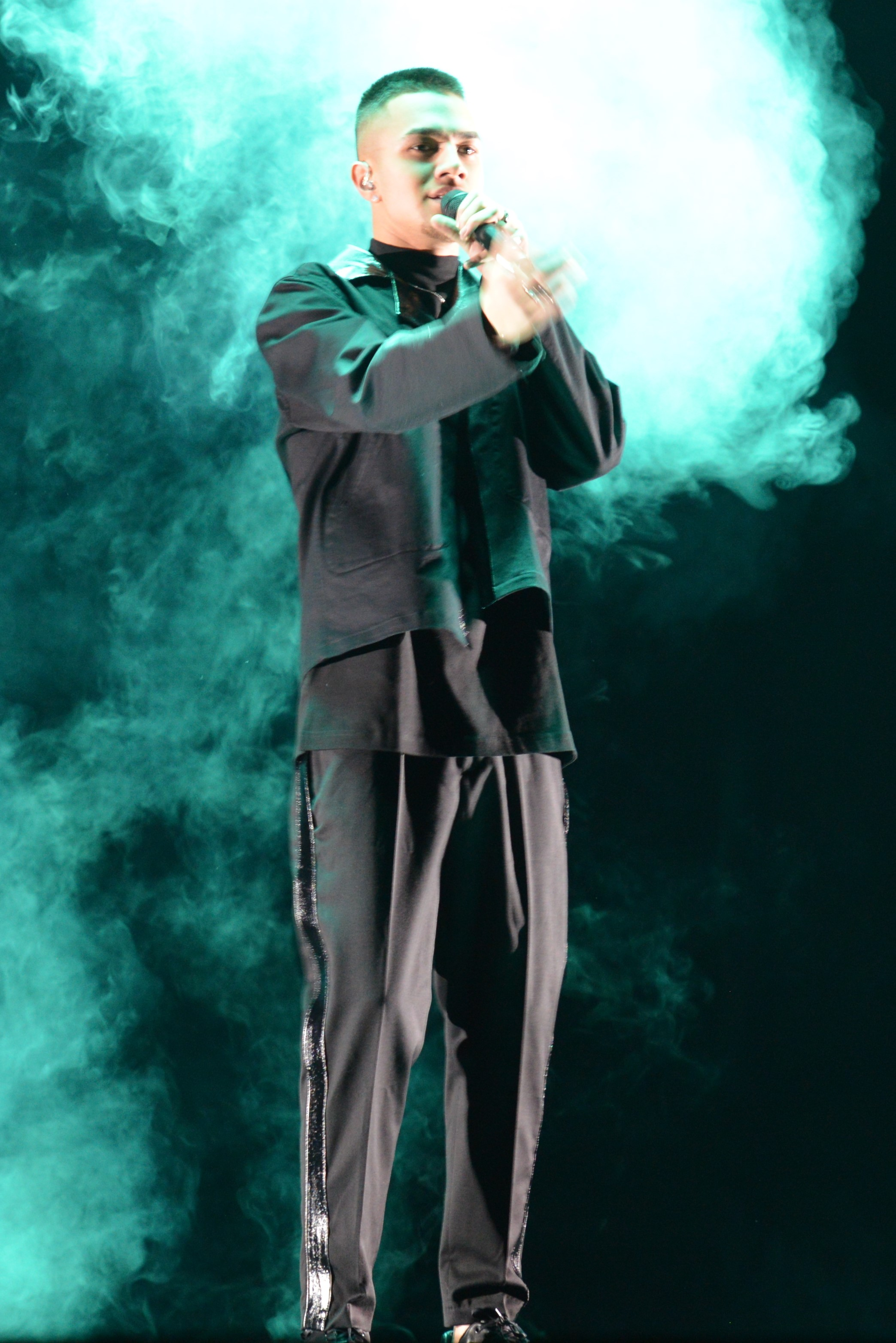
LIAMOO - Last Breath

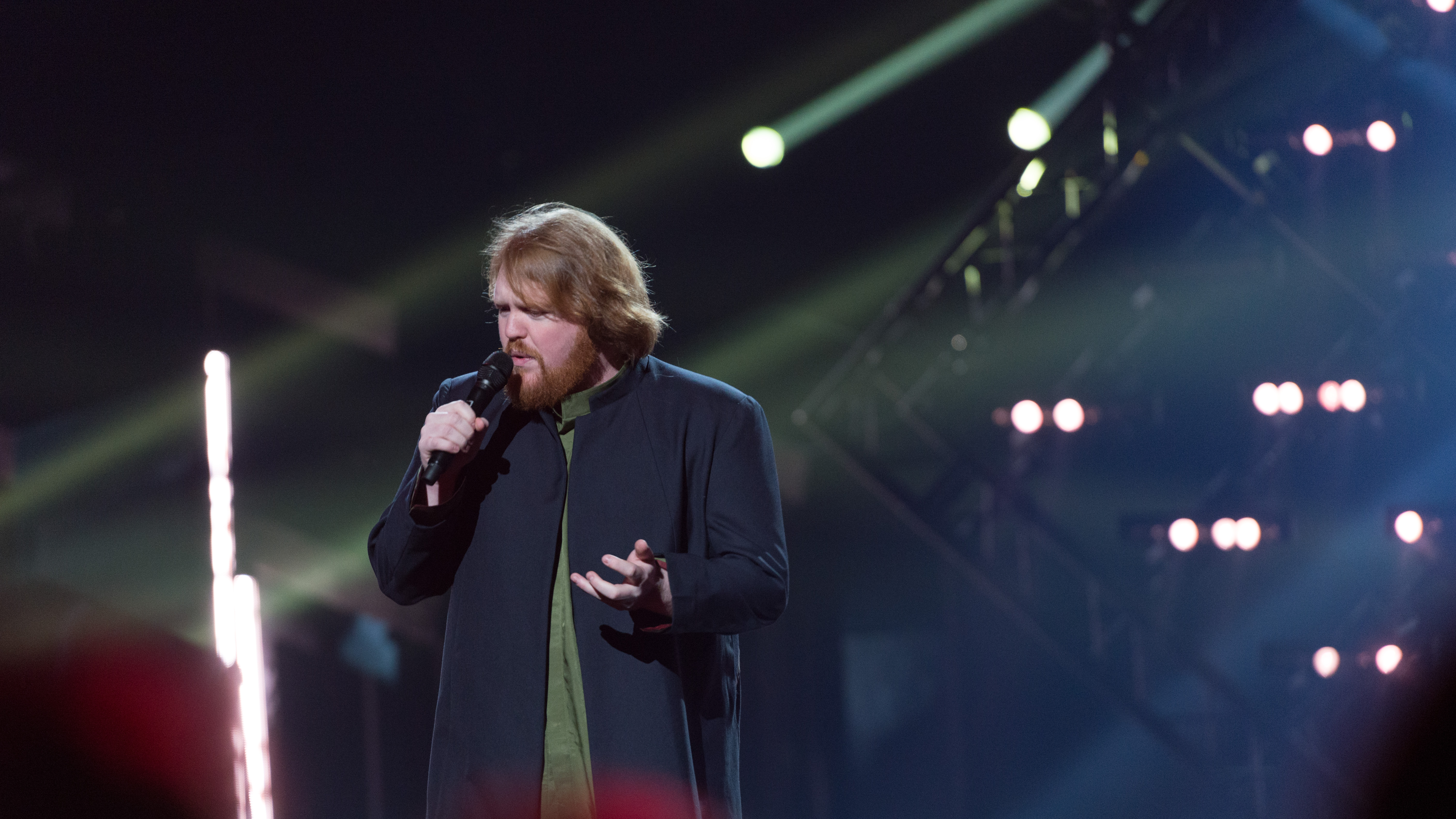
Martin Almgren - A Bitter Lullaby

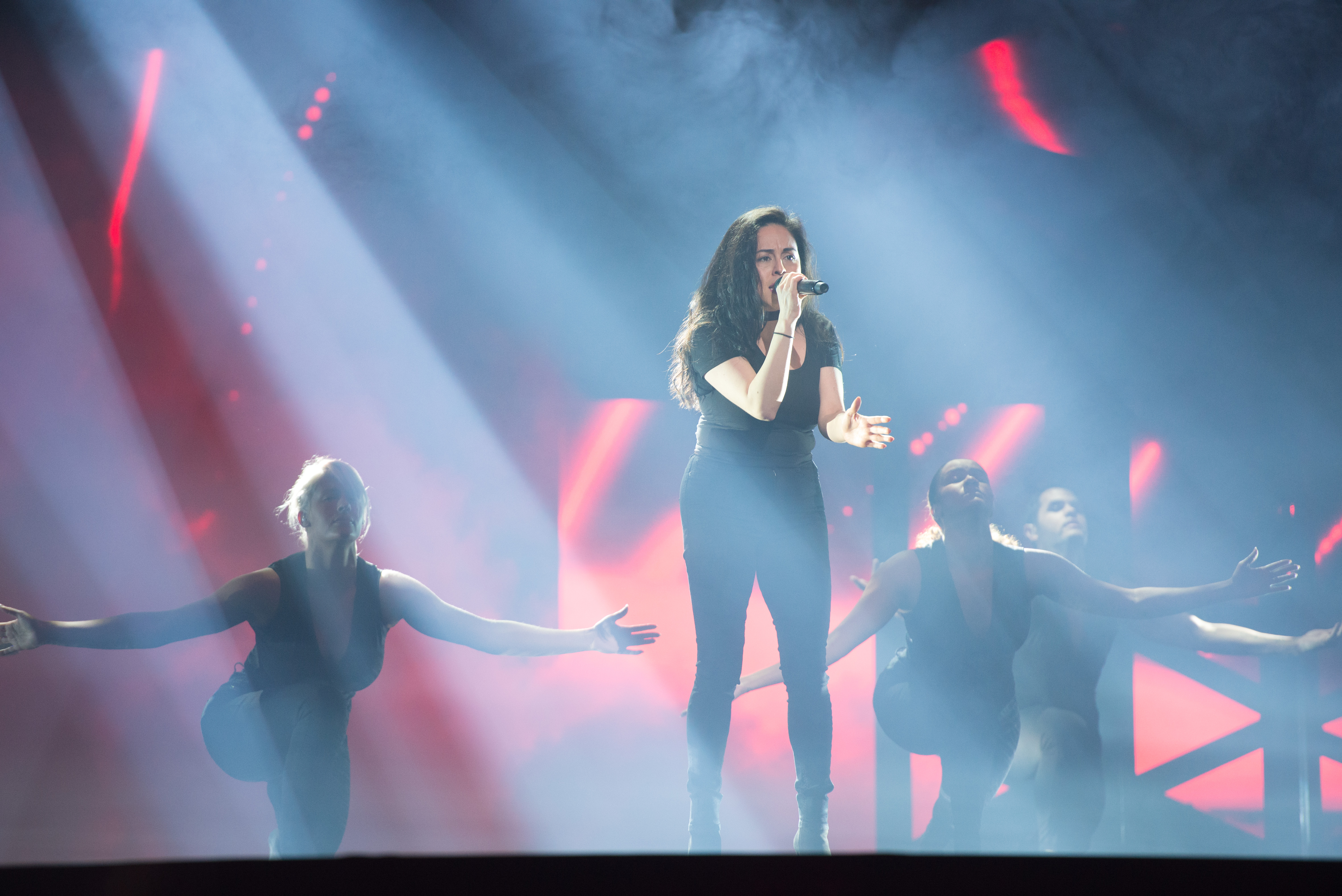
Barbi Escobar - Stark

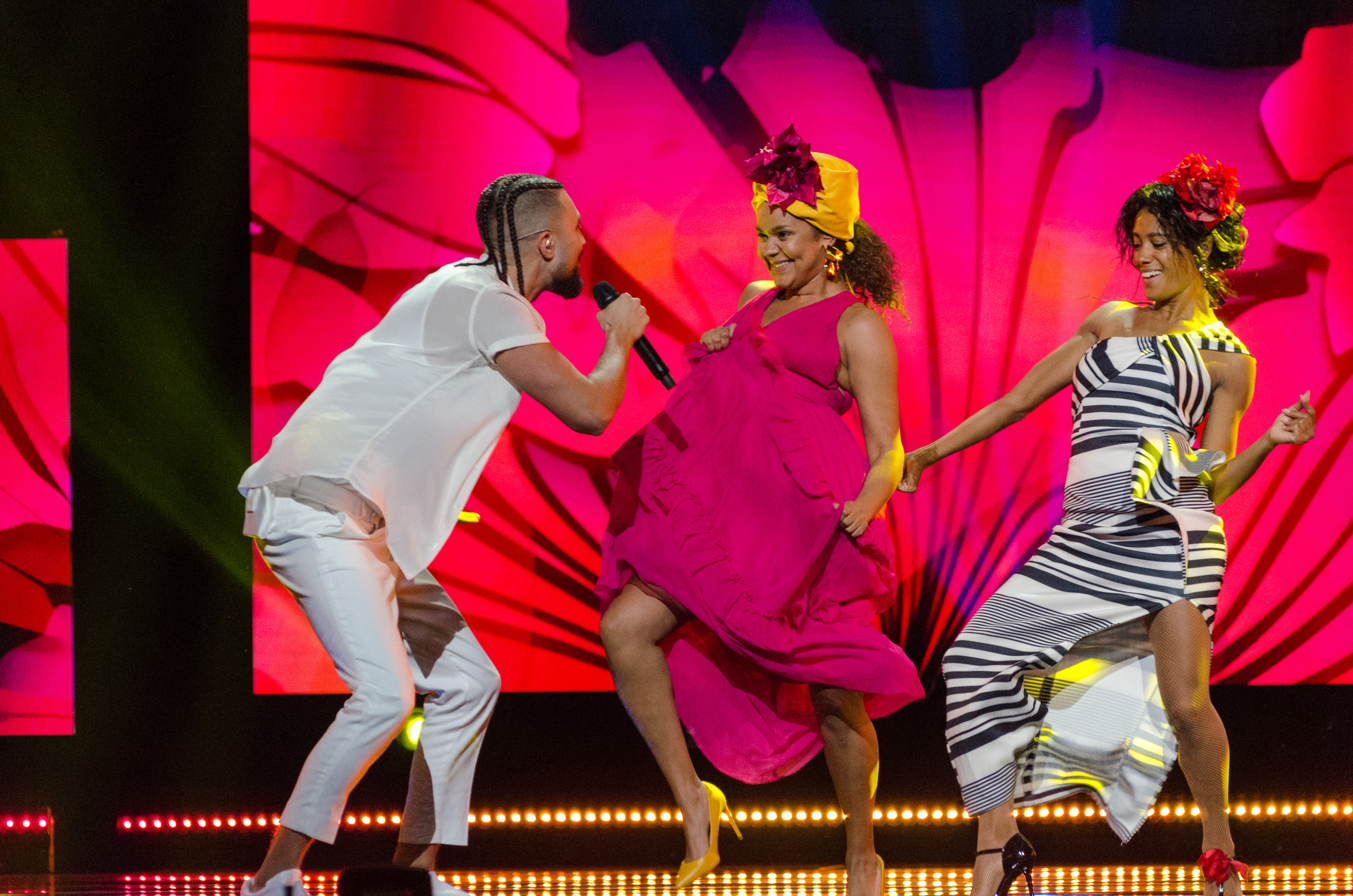
Moncho - Cuba Libre

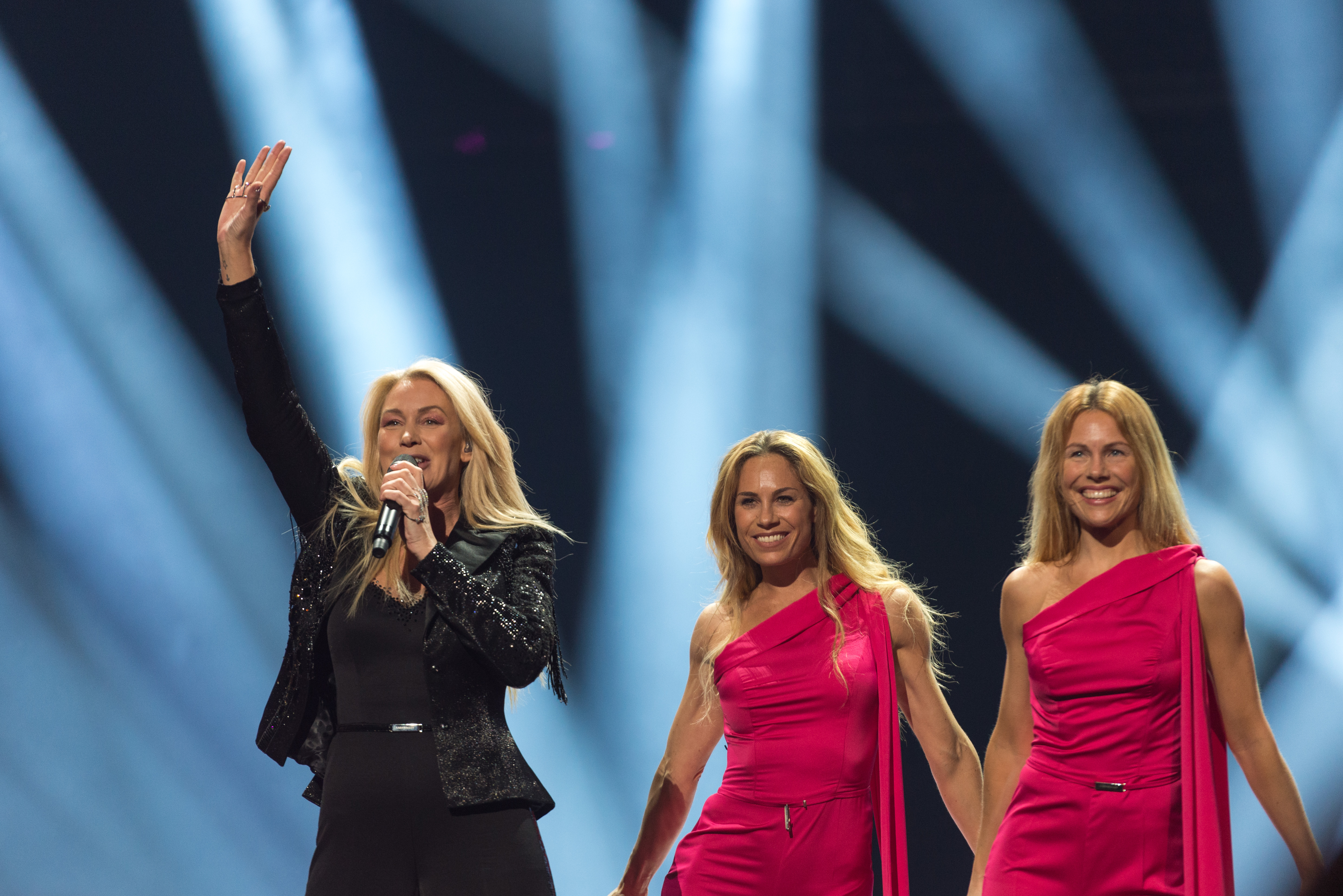
Jessica Andersson - Party Voice

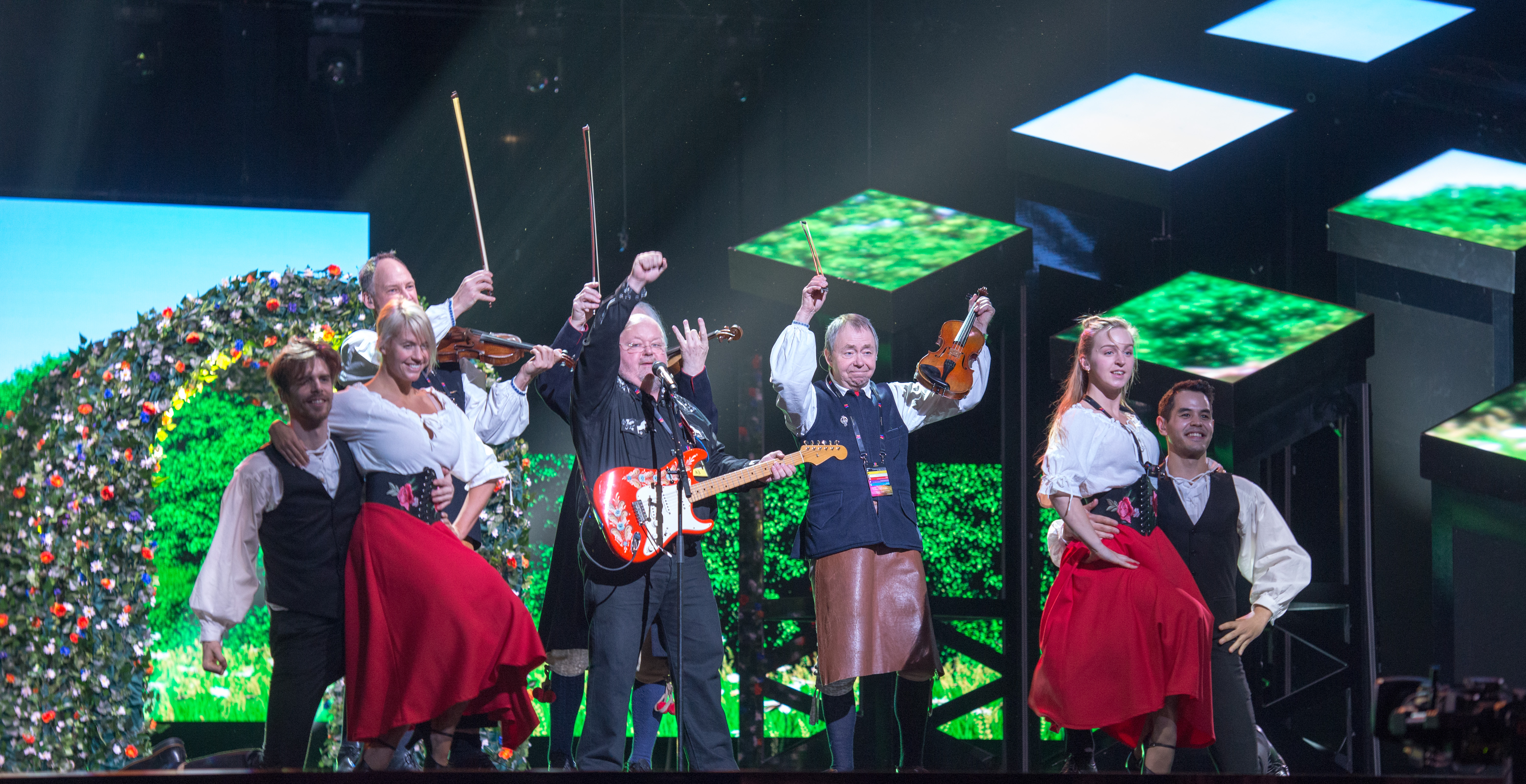
Kalle Moraeus & Orsa Spelmän - Min dröm

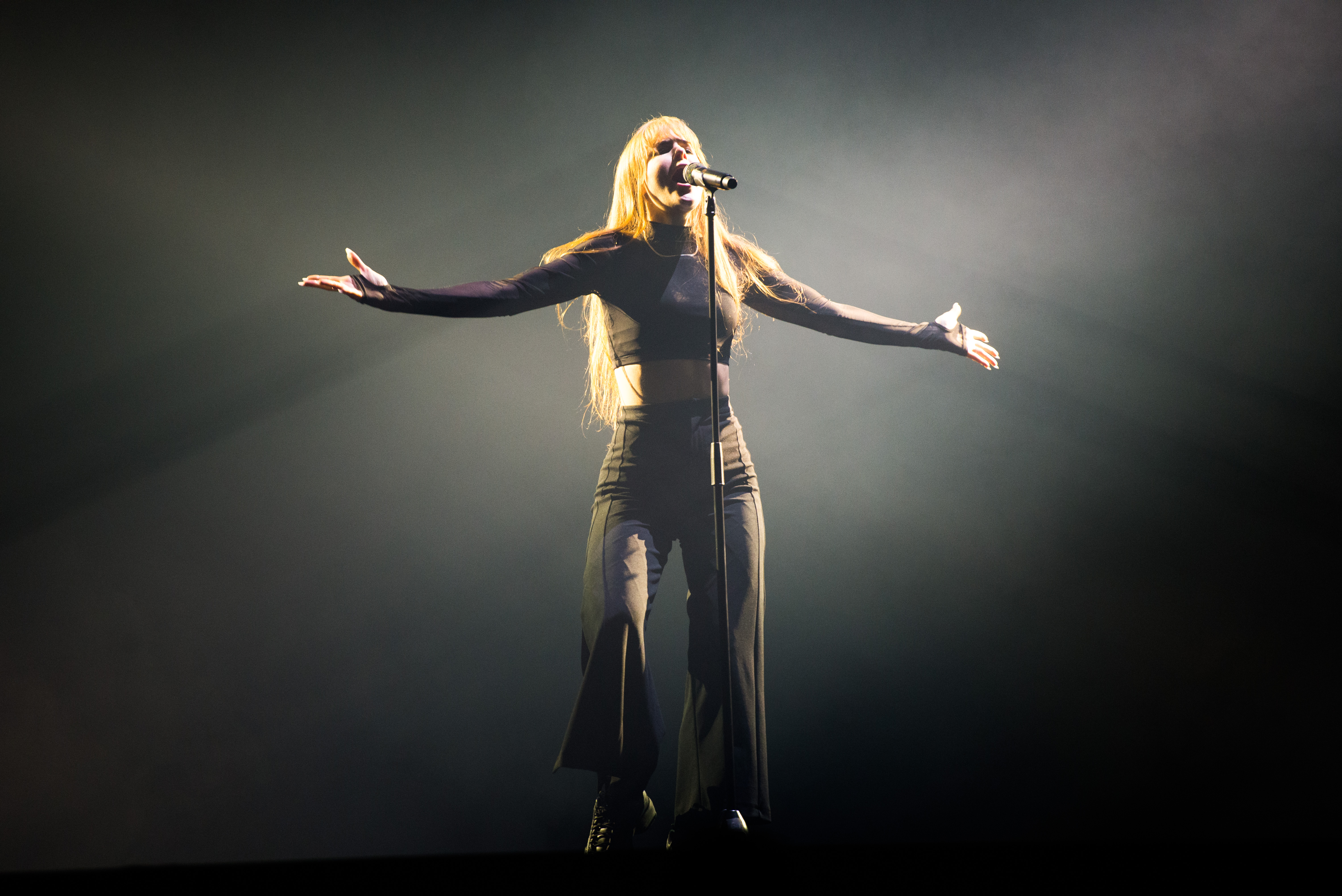
Dotter - Cry

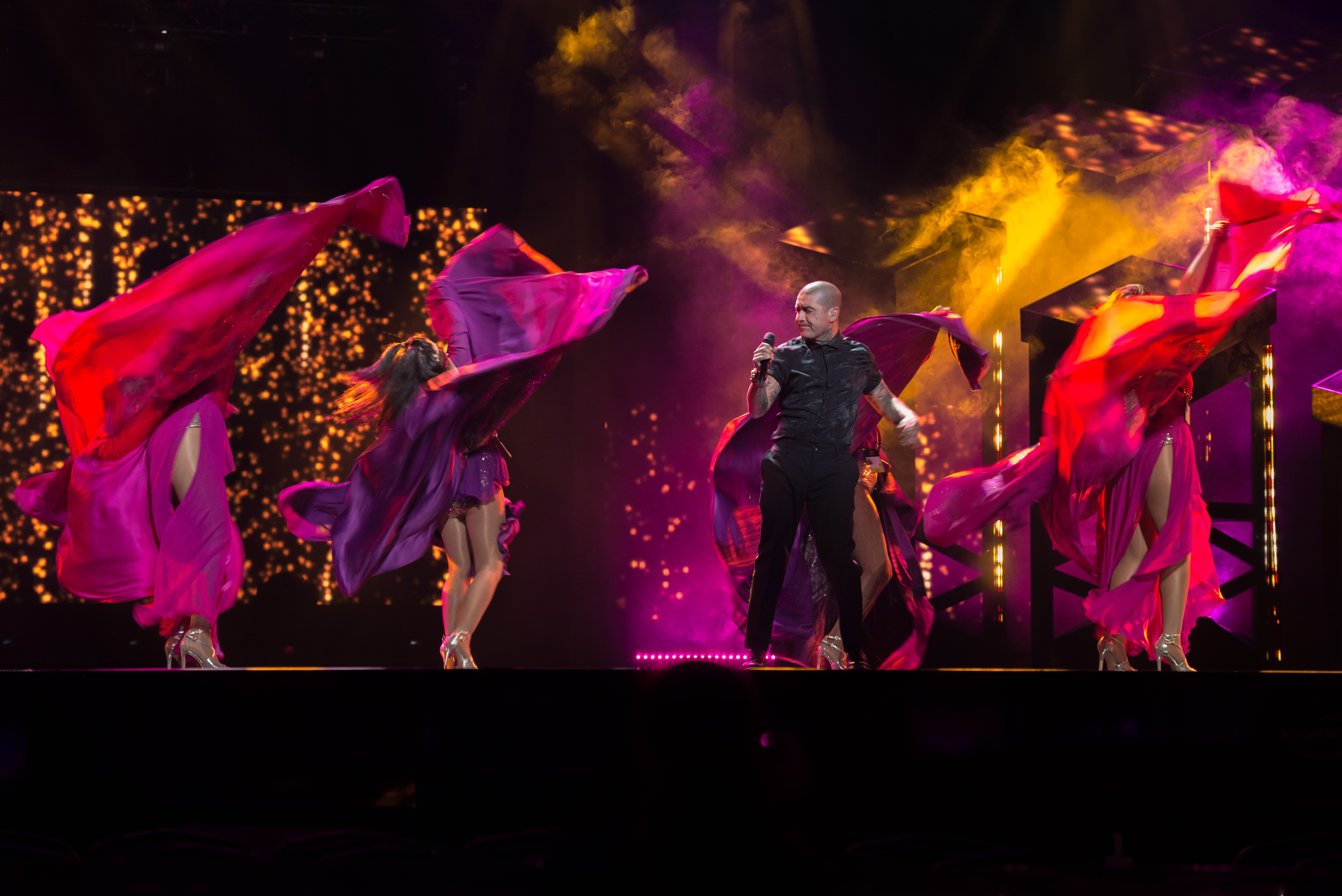
Mendez - Everyday
