= Fredrik Svensson (presenter) =

Swedish television personality

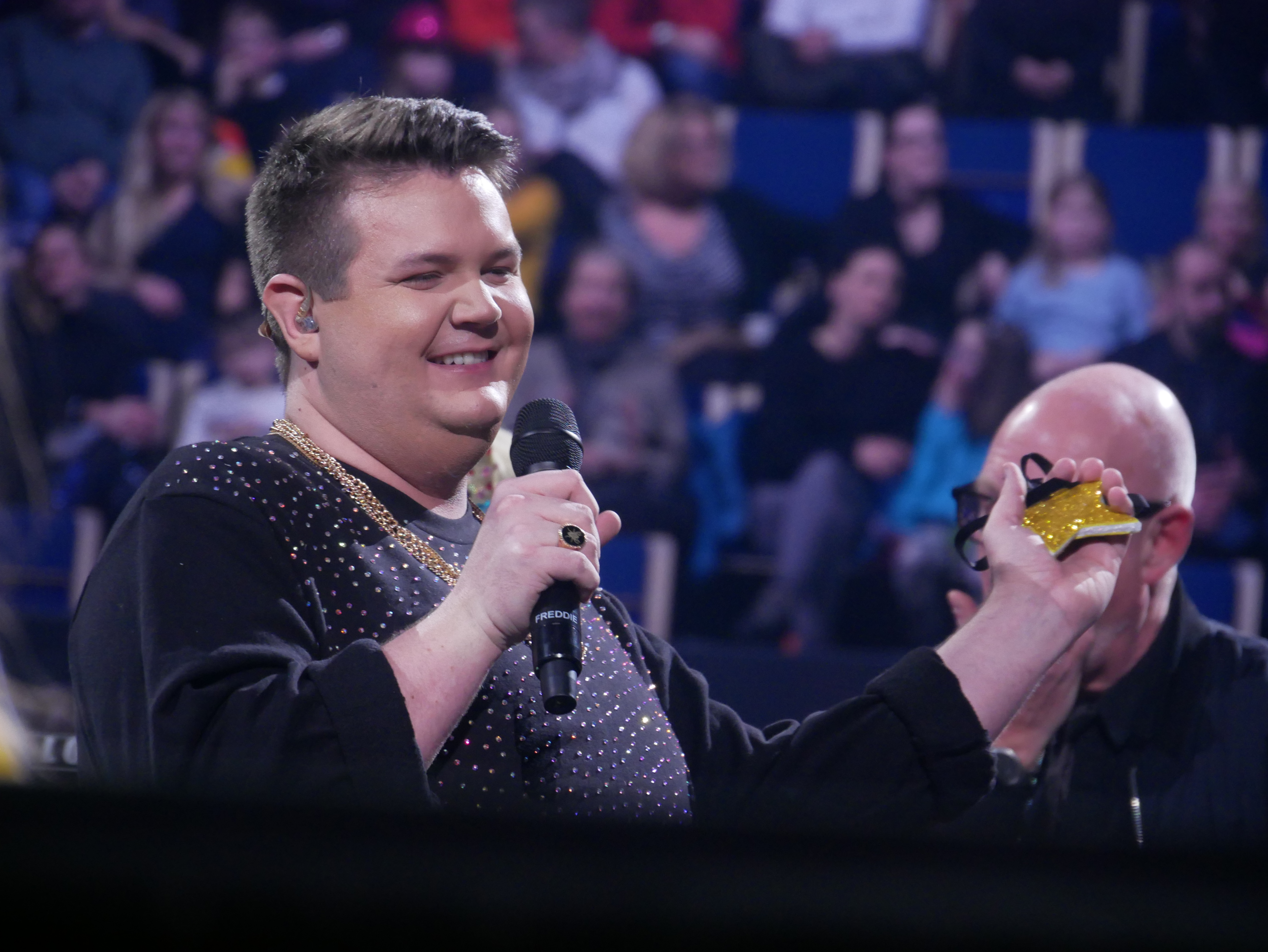
- Fredrik Svensson at Melodifestivalen 2018
- Born: 3 October 1990 (age 35); Påryd, Sweden
- Occupation(s): Television personality, television presenter

Erik Fredrik Christian Svensson (born 3 October 1990), better known as Freddie or Fab Freddie, is a Swedish television personality and presenter. He was the sidekick of David Lindgren in Melodifestivalen 2018. He has earlier been a television presenter for the Barnkanalen show Morgonshowen. In 2017, he presented the Barnkanalen kids show Random Mix.

== Biography ==
Svensson studied IT and media at John Bauergymnasiet in Kalmar, and then studied TV production at Gamleby folkhögskola. After finishing his education he moved to Stockholm and started working as production manager for guest and contestants for TV productions such as Körslaget, Let's Dance (both broadcast on TV4) and Paradise Hotel (broadcast on TV3). He then worked as a runner during the filming of the TV shows Solsidan and Real Humans. In 2013, Svensson won an award for "Best organizer" at the TV producers award gala Riagalan, for his work as an organizer for the audience on several TV productions. He has also presented an award during the QX gay gala in 2018.

Svensson has appeared in several YouTube videos with other YouTubers and presented his own shows on Splay such as "Sminkduellen", "Försökskaninerna" and "Fomo".

In 2016, Svensson presented the Barnkanalen morning show Morgonshowen. In 2017 he presented the kids show Random Mix at Barnkanalen.

In 2016, Svensson acted as the "kids superhero" during the Världens barn-gala travelling around Sweden and collected money for Världens barn help organization. The gala was broadcast on SVT.

In 2017, he started the podcast Fabfreddie och helt vanliga Mia TV-podden, along with TV-producer Mia Berg, in which they tell about their experiences in the TV industry.

During Melodifestivalen 2018 he was a sidekick to presenter David Lindgren, as "Fab Freddie".

He participated as a celebrity dance in Let's Dance 2019, which was broadcast on TV4.
