= Allting som vi sa =

Single by Ida Redig
- Released: 10 February 2018
- Recorded: 2017
- Length: 2:57
- Label: Warner Music Sweden
- Songwriters: Yvonne Dahlbom; Jesper Welander; Ida Redig
- Producers: Yvonne Dahlbom; Jesper Welander; Ida Redig

"Allting som vi sa" (transl. Everything we said) is a song recorded by Swedish singer Ida Redig. The song was released as a digital download in Sweden on 10 February 2018 and peaked at number 74 on the Swedish Singles Chart. It took part in Melodifestivalen 2018, but did not qualify out of the second semi-final on 10 February 2018. It was written by Redig along with Yvonne Dahlbom and Jesper Welander.

== Track listing ==
Digital download
No.	Title	Length
1.	"Allting som vi sa"	2:57

== Charts ==
Chart (2018)	Peak position
Sweden (Sverigetopplistan)	74

== Release history ==
Region	Date	Format	Label
Sweden	10 February 2018	Digital download	Warner Music Sweden
