= A Bitter Lullaby =

Single by Martin Almgren
- Recorded: 2017
- Length: 2:59
- Label: Capitol Music
- Songwriter(s): Josefin Glenmark; Märta Grauers

"A Bitter Lullaby" is a song performed by Swedish singer Martin Almgren. Almgren participated with the song in Melodifestivalen 2018 where it directly qualified for the final by virtue of topping Heat 3, and eventually finished eighth in the overall competition, out of the 12 finalists.

== Charts ==
Chart (2018)	Peak position
Sweden (Sverigetopplistan)	27
