= Stiko Per Larsson =

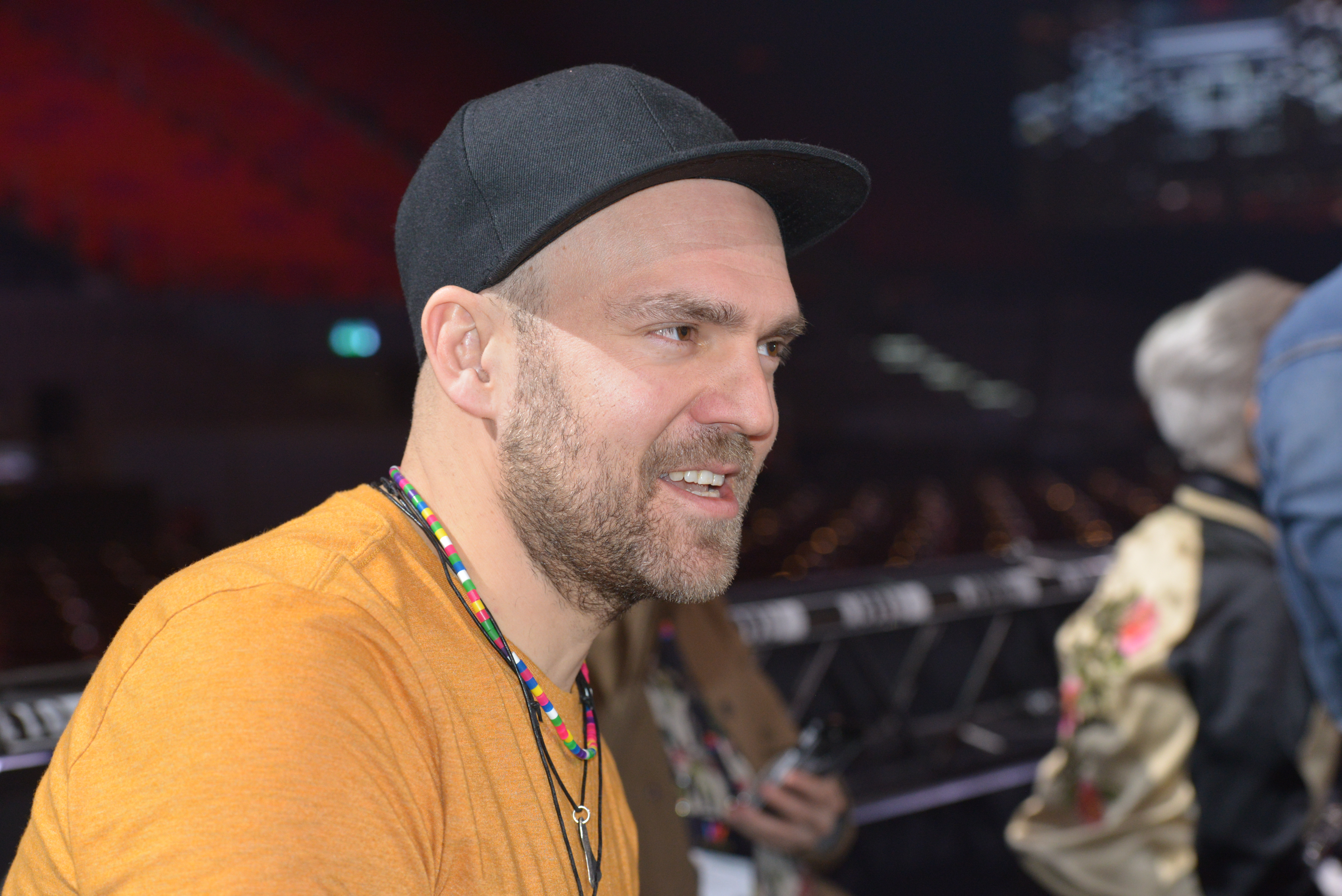
- Stiko Per Larsson at Melodifestivalen 2018.

Background information
- Born: 20 November 1978 (age 47); Leksand, Sweden
- Occupations: Singer, Songwriter
- Website: stikoperlarsson.com

Stiko Per Larsson (born 20 November 1978) is a Swedish singer and songwriter. His first self-penned music album was released on 23 April 2008 and was named Flyktsagor which peaked at number 41 on the Sverigetopplistan. His second album Kap farväl was released in April 2009 and peaked at number 30, and in 2011 his third album Varken stjärna eller frälst peaked at number 18. He then released Järnbärarland in 2013, which was followed by ...har en grej på gång in 2015. Larsson has also performed at Peace & Love festival several times.

Through P4 Nästa at Sveriges Radio he won a place in Melodifestivalen 2018 after winning the radio shows final. He performed the song "Titta vi flyger" in Melodifestivalen's second semifinal, but did not qualify. Larsson has since 2007 annually been going on music march for SOS Children's Villages with all proceeds going to the help organization up until 2016 his marches where he plays music for people and they give money had reached over one million (SEK).

In 2017, his music march started to raise money for the Child cancer foundation in Sweden, he marched 612 kilometers, did 27 performances and raised a total of 417 371 (SEK) for the Child Cancer foundation.

== Discography ==
=== Albums ===
Title	Year	Peak chart positions
Title	Year	SWE
Flyktsagor	2008	41
Kap farväl	2009	30
Varken stjärna eller frälst	2011	18
Järnbärarland	2013	21
...har en grej på gång	2015	—
Titta vi flyger	2018	—
Fri fågel	2021	42

=== Singles ===
Title	Year	Album
"Titta vi flyger"	2018	Non-album single
