= Fuldans =

Single
- Language: Swedish
- Released: February 2018
- Songwriter(s): Fredrik Kempe, Robert Gustafsson, Regina Hedman

singles chronology
| "Rolandz" | "Fuldans" |

"Fuldans" is a song performed by Swedish danceband Rolandz in Melodifestivalen 2018. The song made it to the final in Friends Arena on 10 March 2018.

== Charts ==
| Chart (2018) | Peak position |
|---|---|
| Sweden (Sverigetopplistan) | 12 |
