= Edward Blom =

Swedish historian and writer

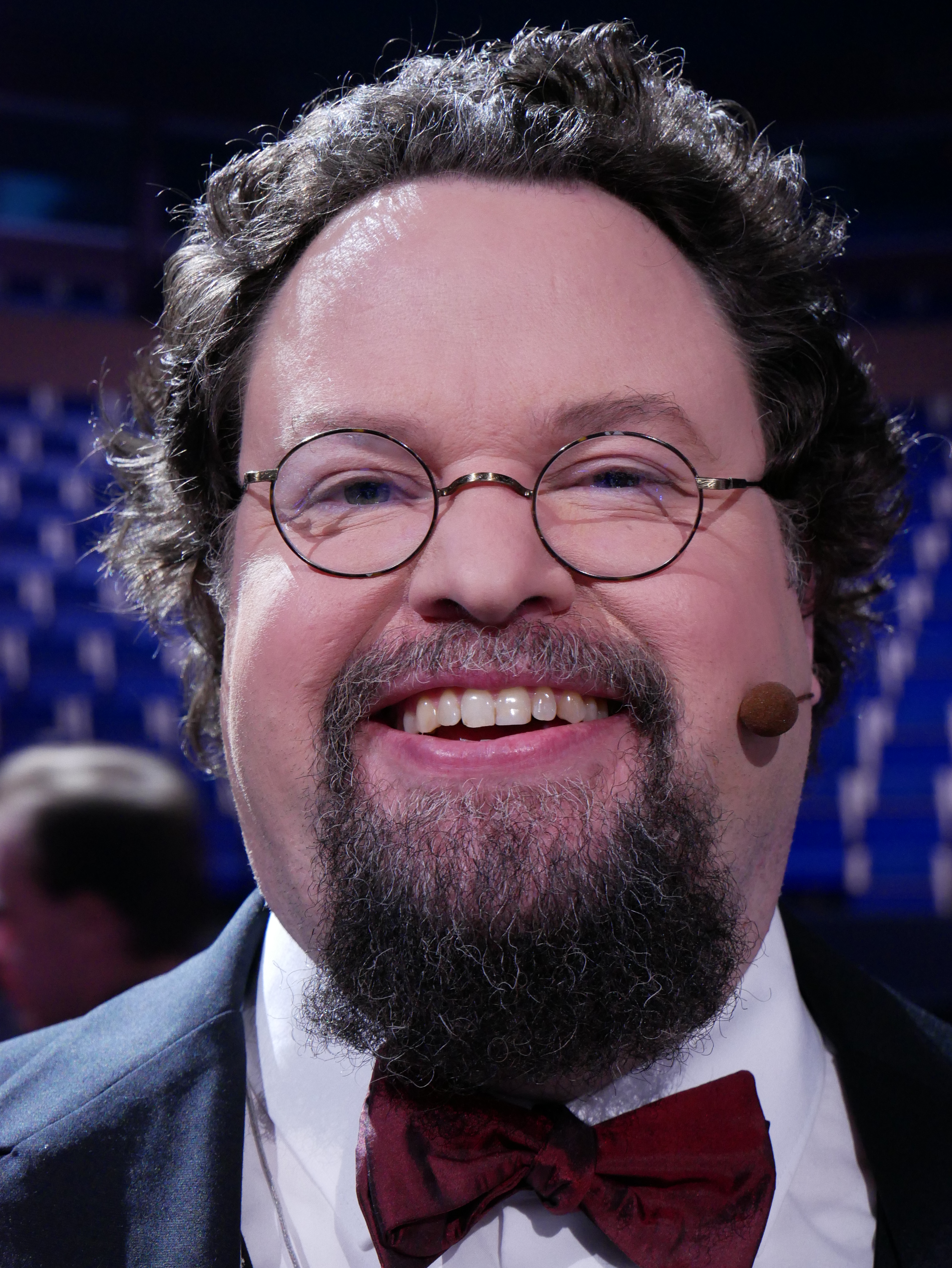
- Edward Blom at Melodifestivalen 2018.
- Born: 22 October 1970 (age 55); Ekerö, Sweden
- Occupations: archivist, gastronome, trade historian, writer, television personality

Edward Blom (born 22 October 1970 in Ekerö, Sweden) is a Swedish archivist, trade historian, writer and a television personality.

== Biography ==
Blom was born in Ekerö (Sweden) and is the brother of the Swedish author Anna Dunér. He studied humanities at the universities of Trier, Stockholm, Uppsala and Freiburg, where he became a member of Corps Suevia Freiburg. In 1996, he earned a degree in archival studies. He is one of the founders of the Verein Corpsstudenten in Schweden (Students' Club Corp in Sweden, a German Student Corps), a board member of the Concordia Catholica (the Catholic Union) and an active member, among other things, of the Sällskapet Emil Hildebrands Vänner (Society of Emil Hildebrand's Friends) and Par Bricole. He was previously vice president of the Catholic Historical Association in Sweden.

He works as a boss at särskilda projekt (special projects) at the Centre for Business History in Stockholm. He was the editor of their business magazine Företagsminnen (Corporate Memories). He is very much involved in the history of trade, food and beverages. He performed the song Livet på en Pinne at Melodifestivalen 2018.

Blom has taken part in several programs about the history of the trade, especially for the Swedish TV channel TV8, including the series Fredag med Edward (Friday with Edward). In 2009, he became known to a wider audience with the series Mellan skål och vägg med Edward Blom (Between Bowl and Wall with Edward Blom), where he travels around Sweden together with economics journalist Peter Andersson, showcasing gastronomy and drinks and telling stories from the places they visited. He appears regularly on radio, especially, on Sveriges Radio P3's programme Morgonpasset.

He has contributed articles to a great number of journals, including Arv och Minne (Heritage and Memory, published by Catholic Historical Association in Sweden); Den lille Fascikeln (The Little Fascicles); Katolskt magasin (Catholic Magazine), and Tema Arkiv (Theme Archive).

Blom is a well-known and active member in the Catholic community, and in 2008 was ordained as a Knight of the Order of the Holy Sepulchre of Jerusalem by the Catholic Bishop Anders Arborelius.

== Discography ==
=== Singles ===
Title	Year	Peak chart positions	Album
Title	Year	SWE	Album
"Nu lagar vi julen"	2016	—	Non-album singles
"Livet på en pinne"	2018	51	Non-album singles

=== Featured singles ===
Title	Year	Peak chart positions	Album
Title	Year	SWE	Album
"När man festar festar man" (Tonsatt featuring Edward Blom)	2017	32	Non-album single

== Bibliography ==
=== Books and eBooks ===
- Deutsche, die das Stockholmer Brauereiwesen industrialisierten (2009) (Germans who industrialized the Stockholm brewery industry)
- Handelsbilder – 125 år med Svensk Handel (2008) (Business Pictures – 125 years with the Swedish Trade)
- Tyskarna som industrialiserade Stockholms bryggerinäring: en studie i till Stockholm invandrade tyska bryggare och bryggeriarbetare under 1800-talets senare hälft, med inriktning på nätverk och personer (2007) (The Germans Who Developed Stockholm's Brewery Industry: a study of the immigrant German brewers and brewery workers during the second half of the 1800s, with a focus on networks and people)
- Den svenska handelns historia (2006) (History of Swedish trade (2006)).
- Familjeföreningen Concordia Catholica 1995-2005 – Jubileumsskrift över föreningens senaste decennium med anledning av dess 110-årsjubileum (2005), tillsammans med James Blom (Concordia Catholic Family Association 1995-2005 – Anniversary of the Society's Last Decade on the Occasion of its 110th Anniversary, with James Blom)
- ICA-historien – i parti och detalj (2003). (ICA history – in the wholesale and retail)
- Jehanders – 125 år i Stockholmarnas tjänst (1999), tillsammans med Lars Lundqvist (Jehanders – 125 Years in the Service of Stockholmers, with Lars Lundqvist)

=== Articles ===
- "Agape", novell i: Anna Braw (red) Tillsammansmat (2007) ("Agape", short story in: Anna Braw (red) Tillsammansmat)
- "Säljande gudar och livbojar" i Identitet : om varumärken, tecken och symboler (2002). (Selling gods and lifebuoys in Identity: Brand, Signs and Symbols).
- "Berömda arkivspex och arkivrevyer" i Tjugo år med Arkivrådet AAS (redaktörer Olle Ebbinghaus & Ulrika Grönquist) ("Famous Archive Reports and Archive Revues" for Twentieth Years with the Archives Council AAS (editors Olle Ebbinghaus & Ulrika Grönquist)
- Flera artiklar i cd/DVD:erna Söder i våra hjärtan (1998). (Several articles in the CD / DVDs South of Our Heart)
- The Ericsson Files (2001),
- Gamla Stan under 750 år (2002). (Old Town for 750 Years)
