= All the Feels (song) =

Single by Renaida
- Released: 3 February 2018
- Recorded: 2017
- Length: 2:58
- Label: Sony Music Sweden
- Songwriter(s): Laurell Barker; Jon Hällgren; Peter Barringer; Lukas Hällgren

Renaida singles chronology
"All the Feels" (2018)	"Loco Notion" (2018)

"All the Feels" is a song recorded by Swedish singer Renaida. The song was released as a digital download in Sweden on 3 February 2018 and peaked at number 17 on the Swedish Singles Chart. It participated in Melodifestivalen 2018 and qualified to Andra chansen (second chance round) from the first semi-final on 3 February 2018. It placed ninth in the overall competition, out of the 12 finalists. It was written by Laurell Barker, Jon Hällgren, Peter Barringer, and Lukas Hällgren.

== Track listing ==
Digital download
No.	Title	Length
1.	"All the Feels"	2:58

== Charts ==
Chart (2018)	Peak position
Sweden (Sverigetopplistan)	17

== Release history ==
Region	Date	Format	Label
Sweden	3 February 2018	Digital download	Sony Music Sweden
