= 2018 in Nordic music =

The following is a list of notable events and releases that happened in Nordic music in 2018.

== Events ==
=== January ===
- 12
  - Norwegian singer Sigrid is named winner of the BBC's "Sound of 2018" award.
  - The 22nd Folklandia Cruise starts in Helsinki, Finland, running until 13 January.
- 13 – Composer Paavo Heininen, considered by many to be Finland's most influential musician, celebrates his 80th birthday with a concert at the Järvenpää Hall, Helsinki.
- 19 – The 37th annual Djangofestival starts in Oslo, Norway, to run until 20 January.
- 28 – Jazz guitarist Gustav Lundgren and his trio perform a tribute to Django Reinhardt at Stockholm Concert Hall, featuring Aurélien Trigo and Antoine Boyer.
- 30 – Danish composer Hans Abrahamsen is awarded the Léonie Sonning Music Prize 2019.

=== February ===
- 10 – The 38th Dansk Melodi Grand Prix is won by "Higher Ground", performed by Rasmussen.
- 14 – Norwegian singer Sigrid wins Best New Artist at the NME Awards ceremony.
- 22 – It is announced that Agnes Obel has signed to Deutsche Grammophon, who will have a joint arrangement with Blue Note for North American releases.

=== March ===
- 3 – At Söngvakeppnin 2018, Ari Ólafsson is selected to represent Iceland in the 2018 Eurovision Song Contest, with the song "Heim". After winning the context, Ólafsson is criticised on social media for crying on hearing the result.
- 7 – Fifteen-year-old cellist Birgitta Elisa Oftestad wins the Virtuos 2018 competition and is named Norway's representative at the Eurovision Young Musicians 2018 contest.
- 9 – Finnish band Nightwish begins a nine-month world tour titled Decades: World Tour, accompanying a new 2CD compilation called Decades.
- 10 – The final of Melodifestivalen 2018 takes place in Friends Arena, Stockholm, Sweden.
- 12 – The Finnish Radio Symphony Orchestra, under Hannu Lintu, begins a week-long series of concerts in Germany.
- 25
  - Swedish House Mafia unexpectedly reunite for a performance at the 20th Anniversary of Ultra Music Festival in Miami, United States.
  - Greenlandic singer Nive Nielsen stars as "Lady Silence" in a new US horror series, The Terror, her first international TV role.

=== April ===
- 27 – ABBA announce that they have recorded some new songs, the first since 1983.

=== May ===
- 8 – In semi-final 1 of the Eurovision Song Contest 2018, Iceland's entry is eliminated, but Finland's Saara Aalto finishes 10th and makes it to the final.
- 10 – In semi-final 2 of the Eurovision Song Contest, Norway's entry finishes in first place, Sweden 2nd and Denmark 5th; all three countries make it to the final.
- 12 – In the Eurovision final, held in Lisbon, Sweden does best of the Scandinavian countries, finishing in 7th place.
- 23 - The Bergen International Festival opens in Bergen, Norway, running until 6 June. Guest performers include Meow Meow, Selene Muñoz and Helsinki Songs.

=== June ===
- 6 – The 26th Sweden Rock Festival opens in Norje, running until 9 June. The Quill are forced to withdraw the day before the festival begins, because lead singer Magnus Ekwall is recovering from emergency surgery.

=== July ===
- 3 – The organizers confirm that the Nobel Peace Prize Concert, normally held after the awards ceremony in Oslo, will not take place in 2018.
- 4 – The 19th Folk music festival of Siglufjordur opens in Siglufjordur, Iceland, running until 8 July.
- 5 – Gregory Porter guest stars at the 2018 Kongsberg Jazzfestival in Norway.
- 27 – The Uppsala Reggae Festival opens in Sweden, running until 28 July, headlined by Jimmy Cliff.

=== September ===
- 5 – The Copenhagen World Music Festival opens, running until 9 September.
- 6 – The Lahti Sibelius Festival opens, running until 9 September.

=== November ===
- 7 – The Iceland Airwaves music festival opens, running until 10 November. Guests include Blood_Orange, Cashmere Cat and Stella Donnelly.

=== December ===
- 6 – Icelandic Music Day is celebrated.

== Albums released ==
=== January ===
Day	Album	Artist	Label	Notes	Ref.
5	Trident Wolf Eclipse	Watain	Century Media		
19	Contra La Indecisión	Bobo Stenson Trio (Anders Jormin, Jon Fält)	ECM	Produced by Manfred Eicher	
19	Elvesang	Sigurd Hole	Elvesang		
19	Lucus	Thomas Strønen & Time Is A Blind Guide	ECM		

=== February ===
Day	Album	Artist	Label	Notes	Ref.
2	Delights Of Decay	Batagraf	Jazzland	Produced by Jon Balke, Kåre Christoffer Vestrheim	
2	Live at Victoria	Solveig Slettahjell	Jazzland	Produced by Solveig Slettahjell	
9	History	Emmelie de Forest	Cosmos	First album after two-year break from recording	
13	Heat	Knut Reiersrud Band	Jazzland		
23	Reformation Part 1	Super8 & Tab	Armada Music		
23	Pilgrim	Janne Mark with Arve Henriksen	ACT	Produced by Esben Eyermann and Janne Mark	

=== March ===
Day	Album	Artist	Label	Notes	Ref.
1	Takker	Thomas Helmig	Genlyd Grammofon		
2	Ravensburg	Mathias Eick	ECM	Produced by Manfred Eicher	
9	Decades	Nightwish	Nuclear Blast		
23	Returnings	Jakob Bro with Palle Mikkelborg, Thomas Morgan, and Jon Christensen	ECM	Produced by Manfred Eicher	
30	Geimvísindi	Hildur Vala Einarsdóttir		The singer's first album to contain original material	

=== April ===
Day	Album	Artist	Label	Notes	Ref.
6	Polarity	Hoff Ensemble - Jan Gunnar Hoff, Anders Jormin, Audun Kleive	2L	Produced by Morten Lindberg	
20	Barxeta II	Per Mathisen & Jan Gunnar Hoff feat. Horacio "El Negro" Hernandez	Losen	Produced by Jan Gunnar Hoff and Per Mathisen	
20	Freedoms Trio II	Steinar Aadnekvam	Losen	Produced by Steinar Aadnekvam	
20	Ultra	Sivas	Disco:Wax	#1 in Danish album chart	
27	Större	Molly Sandén	unknown		
27	Ootsä nähny Nikkee	Nikke Ankara	unknown		
27	Wild Wild Wonderland	Saara Aalto	Warner	Finnish Albums (Suomen virallinen lista)	2

=== May ===
Day	Album	Artist	Label	Notes	Ref.
4	Sway	Tove Styrke	RCA Records		
18	A Suite of Poems	Ketil Bjørnstad, Anneli Drecker, poems by Lars Saabye Christensen	ECM		
25	Late Night Tales: Agnes Obel	Agnes Obel	Night Time Stories Ltd		

=== June ===
Day	Album	Artist	Label	Notes	Ref.
1	Ääripäät	Mikael Gabriel	Universal Music Group		
1	Bertolt Brechts Svendborgdigte	Søren Huss	BaggårdTeatret		
8	So Sad So Sexy	Lykke Li	RCA	Executive producer Malay	
29	Sometimes the World Ain't Enough	The Night Flight Orchestra	Nuclear Blast		

=== July ===
Day	Album	Artist	Label	Notes	Ref.
27	Act II	Tarja Turunen	earMUSIC	Live album	

=== August ===
Day	Album	Artist	Label	Notes	Ref.
24	‘re:member	Ólafur Arnalds	Mercury KX		
31	Helsinki Songs	Trygve Seim	ECM		
31	The Other Side	Tord Gustavsen Trio	ECM		

=== September ===
Day	Album	Artist	Label	Notes	Ref.
21	Immortelle	Say Lou Lou	à Deux	Produced by Trent Mazur and Dash Le Francis	

=== October ===
Day	Album	Artist	Label	Notes	Ref.
5	Bay Of Rainbows	Jakob Bro, Thomas Morgan, and Joey Baron	ECM Records		
12	Sorgir	Skálmöld	Napalm Records		
19	Forever Neverland	MØ	Columbia Records		
26	Christmas With My Friends VI	Nils Landgren	ACT	Produced by Nils Landgren with Johan Norberg	
26	My Soul Kitchen	Ida Sand	ACT	Produced by Nils Landgren and Siggi Loch	
26	Honey	Robyn	Konichiwa Records		

=== November ===
Day	Album	Artist	Label	Notes	Ref.
13	Deep Snow	Simon Lynge	Atlantic Music		
16	The Pursuit of Vikings: 25 Years in the Eye of the Storm	Amon Amarth		Live album	
23	The Ghost Ward Diaries	Electric Boys	Mighty Music	Produced by David Castillo	

=== December ===
Day	Album	Artist	Label	Notes	Ref.
13	Plays Metallica by Four Cellos – A Live Performance	Apocalyptica		Live album - 2CD+1DVD digipak	
14	Let's Boogie! Live from Telia Parken	Volbeat	Republic Records	Live album	

== Film and television scores ==
=== Films ===
- On Her Shoulders (United States), music by Patrick Jonsson
- Ravens (Sweden), music by Peter von Poehl
- The Way to Mandalay (Denmark), biopic about John Mogensen, including some of his music

=== Television ===
- Trapped (Iceland), music by Jóhann Jóhannsson with Hildur Gudnadóttir and Rutger Hoedemaekers

== Eurovision Song Contest ==
- Denmark in the Eurovision Song Contest 2018
- Finland in the Eurovision Song Contest 2018
- Iceland in the Eurovision Song Contest 2018
- Norway in the Eurovision Song Contest 2018
- Sweden in the Eurovision Song Contest 2018

== Deaths ==
- 1 January - Teddy Edelmann, Danish singer, 76
- 18 January – Javiera Muñoz, Swedish singer, 40
- 29 January – Asmund Bjørken, Norwegian jazz musician, 84
- 4 February – Leif Rygg, Norwegian folk musician, 77
- 5 February – Ove Stokstad, Norwegian artist and jazz musician, 78
- 9 February – Jóhann Jóhannsson, Icelandic film composer, 48
- 3 March – Kenneth Gärdestad, pop songwriter, 69
- 5 March – Kjerstin Dellert, Swedish opera singer, 92
- 9 March – Ole H. Bremnes, Norwegian folk singer and poet, 87
- 25 March – Jerry Williams, Swedish singer, 75
- 31 March – Frode Viken, guitarist and songwriter, D.D.E., 63
- 3 April – Lill-Babs, Swedish singer ("En tuff brud i lyxförpackning"), 80
- 20 April – Avicii (Tim Bergling), Swedish musician, DJ and record producer, 28
- 11 May –Mikhail Alperin, Ukrainian-born jazz pianist, member of the Moscow Art Trio, professor at the Norwegian Academy of Music, 61
- 26 June – Bo Nilsson, Swedish composer, 81
- 5 July – Bjørn Lie-Hansen, opera singer, 81
- 9 July – Stefan Demert, Swedish musician, 78
- 16 August – Benny Andersen, Danish writer and pianist, 88
- 21 August – Stefán Karl Stefánsson, Icelandic actor and singer (b. 1975).
- 9 September – Frank Andersson, Swedish entertainer and wrestler, 62 (complications during heart surgery)
- 23 September – Berth Idoff, Swedish musician (Berth Idoffs), 77
- 30 September – Kim Larsen, Danish rock musician (Gasolin'), 72 (prostate cancer)
- 29 November – Erik Lindmark, vocalist and guitarist of Deeds of Flesh, 46 (sclerosis)
