= Sweden in the Eurovision Song Contest 2018 =

- Eurovision Song Contest 2018
- Participating broadcaster: Sveriges Television (SVT)
- Country: Sweden
- Selection process: Melodifestivalen 2018
- Selection date: 10 March 2018

Competing entry
- Song: "Dance You Off"
- Artist: Benjamin Ingrosso
- Songwriters: Marco Borrero; Louis Schoorl; K Nita; Benjamin Ingrosso

Placement
- Semi-final result: Qualified (2nd, 254 points)
- Final result: 7th, 274 points

Participation chronology

Sweden was represented at the Eurovision Song Contest 2018 with the song "Dance You Off", written by Marco Borrero, Louis Schoorl, K Nita, and Benjamin Ingrosso, and performed by Ingrosso himself. The Swedish participating broadcaster, Sveriges Television (SVT), organised the national final Melodifestivalen 2018 in order to select its entry for the contest. After a six-week-long competition consisting of four heats, a Second Chance round and a final, "Dance You Off" performed by Benjamin Ingrosso emerged as the winner after achieving the highest score following the combination of votes from eleven international jury groups and a public vote.

== Background ==
Prior to the 2018 contest, Sveriges Radio (SR) until 1979, and Sveriges Television (SVT) since 1980, had participated in the Eurovision Song Contest representing Sweden fifty-seven times since SR's first entry in 1958. Sweden had won the contest on six occasions: in 1974 with the song "Waterloo" performed by ABBA, in 1984 with the song "Diggi-Loo Diggi-Ley" performed by Herreys, in 1991 with the song "Fångad av en stormvind" performed by Carola, in 1999 with the song "Take Me to Your Heaven" performed by Charlotte Nilsson, in 2012 with the song "Euphoria" performed by Loreen, and in 2015 with the song "Heroes" performed by Måns Zelmerlöw. Following the introduction of semi-finals for the 2004, Sweden's entries, to this point, have featured in every final except for 2010 when the nation failed to qualify.

As part of its duties as participating broadcaster, SVT organises the selection of its entry in the Eurovision Song Contest and broadcasts the event in the country. Since 1959, SR first and SVT later have organised the annual competition Melodifestivalen in order to select their entries for the contest.

== Before Eurovision ==
=== Melodifestivalen 2018 ===
Melodifestivalen 2018 was the Swedish music competition that would select Sweden's entry for the Eurovision Song Contest 2018. 28 songs competed in a six-week-long process which consisted of four heats on 3, 10, 17 and 24 February 2018, a second chance round on 3 March 2018, and a final on 10 March 2018. The six shows were hosted by David Lindgren. Seven songs competed in each heat—the top two qualified directly to the final, while the third and fourth placed songs qualified to the second chance round. The bottom three songs in each heat were eliminated from the competition.

==== Heats and Second Chance round ====
- The first heat took place on 3 February 2018 at the Löfbergs Arena in Karlstad. "Dance You Off" performed by Benjamin Ingrosso and "My Turn" performed by John Lundvik qualified directly to the final, while "Patrick Swayze" performed by Sigrid Bernson and "All the Feels" performed by Renaida advanced to the Second Chance round. "Livet på en pinne" performed by Edward Blom, "Osby Tennessee" performed by Kikki Danielsson, and "Solen lever kvar hos dig" performed by Kamferdrops were eliminated from the contest.
- The second heat took place on 10 February 2018 at the Scandinavium in Gothenburg. "Shuffla" performed by Samir and Viktor and "Last Breath" performed by Liamoo qualified directly to the final, while "In My Cabana" performed by Margaret and "Songburning" performed by Mimi Werner advanced to the Second Chance round. "Allting som vi sa" performed by Ida Redig, "Det finns en väg" performed by Jonas Gardell, and "Titta vi flyger" performed by Stiko Per Larsson were eliminated from the contest.
- The third heat took place on 17 February 2018 at the Malmö Arena in Malmö. "A Bitter Lullaby" performed by Martin Almgren and "Party Voice" performed by Jessica Andersson qualified directly to the final, while "Everyday" performed by Méndez and "Cuba Libre" performed by Moncho advanced to the Second Chance round. "Stark" performed by Barbi Escobar, "Min dröm" performed by Kalle Moraeus and Orsa Spelmän, and "Cry" performed by Dotter were eliminated from the contest.
- The fourth heat took place on 24 February 2018 at the Fjällräven Center in Örnsköldsvik. "For You" performed by Mariette and "Fuldans" performed by Rolandz qualified directly to the final, while "Every Single Day" performed by Felix Sandman and "Never Learn" performed by Olivia Eliasson advanced to the Second Chance round. "Icarus" performed by Emmi Christensson, "Mitt paradis" performed by Elias Abbas, and "Break That Chain" performed by Felicia Olsson were eliminated from the contest.
- The Second Chance round (Andra chansen) took place on 3 March 2018 at the Kristianstad Arena in Kristianstad. "In My Cabana" performed by Margaret, "All the Feels" performed by Renaida, "Every Single Day" performed by Felix Sandman, and "Everyday" performed by Méndez qualified to the final.

==== Final ====
The final took place on 10 March 2018 at the Friends Arena in Solna, Stockholm. Twelve songs competed—two qualifiers from each of the four preceding heats and four qualifiers from the Second Chance round. The combination of points from a viewer vote and eleven international jury groups determined the winner, Benjamin Ingrosso with the song "Dance You Off". The viewers and the juries each had a total of 638 points to award. The nations that comprised the international jury were Albania, Armenia, Australia, Cyprus, France, Georgia, Iceland, Italy, Poland, Portugal and the United Kingdom.

R/O	Artist	Song	Juries	Televote	Total	Place
1	Méndez	"Everyday"	2	62	64	12
2	Renaida	"All the Feels"	30	51	81	9
3	Martin Almgren	"A Bitter Lullaby"	43	41	84	8
4	John Lundvik	"My Turn"	66	62	128	3
5	Jessica Andersson	"Party Voice"	33	37	70	11
6	Liamoo	"Last Breath"	52	53	105	6
7	Samir and Viktor	"Shuffla"	54	60	114	4
8	Mariette	"For You"	64	49	113	5
9	Felix Sandman	"Every Single Day"	94	64	158	2
10	Margaret	"In My Cabana"	62	41	103	7
11	Benjamin Ingrosso	"Dance You Off"	114	67	181	1
12	Rolandz	"Fuldans"	24	51	75	10

== At Eurovision ==
According to Eurovision rules, all nations with the exceptions of the host country and the "Big Five" (France, Germany, Italy, Spain and the United Kingdom) are required to qualify from one of two semi-finals in order to compete for the final; the top ten countries from each semi-final progress to the final. The European Broadcasting Union (EBU) split up the competing countries into six different pots based on voting patterns from previous contests, with countries with favourable voting histories put into the same pot. On 29 January 2018, a special allocation draw was held which placed each country into one of the two semi-finals, as well as which half of the show they would perform in. Sweden was placed into the second semi-final, to be held on 10 May 2018, and was scheduled to perform in the second half of the show.

Once all the competing songs for the 2018 contest had been released, the running order for the semi-finals was decided by the shows' producers rather than through another draw, so that similar songs were not placed next to each other. Sweden was set to perform in position 15, following the entry from Latvia and preceding the entry from Montenegro.

=== Voting ===
Voting during the three shows involved each country awarding two sets of points from 1-8, 10 and 12: one from their professional jury and the other from televoting. Each nation's jury consisted of five music industry professionals who are citizens of the country they represent, with their names published before the contest to ensure transparency. This jury judged each entry based on: vocal capacity; the stage performance; the song's composition and originality; and the overall impression by the act. In addition, no member of a national jury was permitted to be related in any way to any of the competing acts in such a way that they cannot vote impartially and independently. The individual rankings of each jury member as well as the nation's televoting results were released shortly after the grand final.

==== Points awarded to Sweden ====
Points awarded to Sweden (Semi-final 2)
Score	Televote	Jury
12 points		Australia; Georgia; Germany; Netherlands; Norway; Poland; San Marino; Serbia; Slovenia
10 points	Denmark; Norway	Denmark; Malta; Latvia
8 points	Australia	Russia
7 points	Malta	France; Ukraine
6 points	Latvia; Montenegro; Netherlands	Italy
5 points	Poland; Russia; San Marino	
4 points	Ukraine	
3 points		Hungary
2 points	Georgia; Moldova; Romania; Slovenia	Montenegro
1 point	France; Hungary; Serbia	

Points awarded to Sweden (Final)
Score	Televote	Jury
12 points		Armenia; Australia; Cyprus; Georgia; Germany; Latvia; Serbia; Slovenia
10 points		Israel; Norway; Russia
8 points		Austria; Belgium; Czech Republic; Finland; Greece; Lithuania; Netherlands; San Marino
7 points	Denmark	Macedonia; Malta
6 points		Poland; Ukraine
5 points		Estonia; France; Iceland; Switzerland
4 points	Lithuania	Albania; Denmark
3 points	Norway	
2 points	Azerbaijan; Iceland; Montenegro	Bulgaria; Spain; United Kingdom
1 point	Russia	Belarus; Hungary; Italy

==== Points awarded by Sweden ====
Points awarded by Sweden (Semi-final 2)
Score	Televote	Jury
12 points	Denmark	Norway
10 points	Norway	Australia
8 points	Poland	Slovenia
7 points	Australia	Latvia
6 points	Netherlands	Netherlands
5 points	Moldova	Ukraine
4 points	Serbia	Malta
3 points	Slovenia	Romania
2 points	Ukraine	Moldova
1 point	Hungary	Poland

Points awarded by Sweden (Final)
Score	Televote	Jury
12 points	Denmark	Cyprus
10 points	Israel	Austria
8 points	Norway	Australia
7 points	Lithuania	Israel
6 points	Finland	Bulgaria
5 points	Germany	France
4 points	Cyprus	Ireland
3 points	Czech Republic	Finland
2 points	Austria	Norway
1 point	Netherlands	Germany

==== Detailed voting results ====
The following members comprised the Swedish jury:

- Robert Sehlberg (jury chairperson) – head of Music MTG Radio
- Mariette Hansson (Mariette) – singer
- Josefin Glenmark – singer, songwriter
- Arantxa Alvarez – host, singer, radio DJ
- Hamed Pirouzpanah (K-One) – composer, producer

Detailed voting results from Sweden (Semi-final 2)
R/O	Country	Jury							Televote	
R/O	Country	Mariette	J. Glenmark	A. Alvarez	K-One	R. Sehlberg	Rank	Points	Rank	Points
01	Norway	2	11	2	1	3	1	12	2	10
02	Romania	7	3	8	12	12	8	3	14	
03	Serbia	9	16	11	15	16	16		7	4
04	San Marino	16	17	14	17	17	17		17	
05	Denmark	15	12	13	2	11	11		1	12
06	Russia	14	10	15	8	6	13		15	
07	Moldova	17	9	12	4	5	9	2	6	5
08	Netherlands	8	2	16	6	2	5	6	5	6
09	Australia	1	1	7	3	7	2	10	4	7
10	Georgia	5	13	17	10	10	14		13	
11	Poland	13	8	5	5	13	10	1	3	8
12	Malta	6	6	10	11	4	7	4	12	
13	Hungary	12	7	6	16	8	12		10	1
14	Latvia	4	14	4	9	1	4	7	11	
15	Sweden									
16	Montenegro	11	15	9	13	14	15		16	
17	Slovenia	3	5	1	14	9	3	8	8	3
18	Ukraine	10	4	3	7	15	6	5	9	2

Detailed voting results from Sweden (Final)
R/O	Country	Jury							Televote	
R/O	Country	Mariette	J. Glenmark	A. Alvarez	K-One	R. Sehlberg	Rank	Points	Rank	Points
01	Ukraine	11	14	12	17	8	15		21	
02	Spain	16	17	23	13	18	20		24	
03	Slovenia	14	22	14	19	21	21		23	
04	Lithuania	5	20	20	25	11	14		4	7
05	Austria	4	6	1	2	2	2	10	9	2
06	Estonia	10	8	8	12	12	11		15	
07	Norway	13	18	11	8	4	9	2	3	8
08	Portugal	19	21	22	22	20	24		25	
09	United Kingdom	21	24	25	18	14	23		19	
10	Serbia	24	25	24	24	25	25		17	
11	Germany	12	5	10	16	10	10	1	6	5
12	Albania	25	15	13	20	23	22		13	
13	France	6	4	19	10	3	6	5	14	
14	Czech Republic	15	23	21	11	7	16		8	3
15	Denmark	17	11	16	5	16	12		1	12
16	Australia	8	1	3	6	17	3	8	12	
17	Finland	9	7	6	9	13	8	3	5	6
18	Bulgaria	7	3	4	4	19	5	6	22	
19	Moldova	22	16	18	23	9	18		20	
20	Sweden									
21	Hungary	23	19	7	21	15	17		18	
22	Israel	3	10	9	3	5	4	7	2	10
23	Netherlands	20	9	17	14	6	13		10	1
24	Ireland	2	12	5	7	22	7	4	16	
25	Cyprus	1	2	2	1	1	1	12	7	4
26	Italy	18	13	15	15	24	19		11	
