= Russia in the Eurovision Song Contest 2018 =

- Eurovision Song Contest 2018
- Country: Russia
- Selection process: Internal selection
- Announcement date: Artist: 29 January 2018; Song: 11 March 2018

Competing entry
- Song: "I Won't Break"
- Artist: Julia Samoylova
- Songwriters: Netta Nimrodi; Leonid Gutkin; Arie Burshtein

Placement
- Semi-final result: Failed to qualify (15th)

Participation chronology

Russia was represented at the Eurovision Song Contest 2018 with the song "I Won't Break" written by Netta Nimrodi, Leonid Gutkin and Arie Burshtein. The song was performed by Julia Samoylova, who was internally selected by the Russian broadcaster Channel One Russia to represent the nation at the 2018 contest in Lisbon, Portugal.

== Background ==
Prior to the 2018 contest, Russia had participated in the Eurovision Song Contest twenty times since its first entry in 1994. Russia had won the contest on one occasion in 2008 with the song "Believe" performed by Dima Bilan. Russia's least successful result has been 17th place, which they have achieved in the 1995 with the song "Kolybelnaya dlya vulkana" performed by Philipp Kirkorov. Following the introduction of semi-finals for the 2004, Russia has, to this point, managed to qualify to the final on every occasion. In 2016, Russia finished third with the song "You Are the Only One" performed by Sergey Lazarev.

On 12 March 2017, Channel One announced that they had internally selected Julia Samoylova, with her song "Flame is Burning" for the Eurovision Song Contest 2017 which was held in Kyiv, Ukraine. However, on 22 March 2017, the Security Service of Ukraine (SBU) confirmed that Samoylova had been banned from entering Ukraine for three years for illegally travelling to Crimea. On 13 April 2017, the European Broadcasting Union (EBU) said Russia was no longer able to take part in 2017's competition. The Russian state broadcaster Channel One responded by stating that they will not broadcast the contest.

== Before Eurovision ==
=== Internal selection ===
On 29 January 2018, Channel One Russia officially confirmed that Julia Samoylova would represent Russia in the Eurovision Song Contest 2018. Her song for the contest, "I Won't Break" was revealed on the 11 March 2018.

== At Eurovision ==
According to Eurovision rules, all nations with the exceptions of the host country and the "Big Five" (France, Germany, Italy, Spain and the United Kingdom) are required to qualify from one of two semi-finals in order to compete for the final; the top ten countries from each semi-final progress to the final. The European Broadcasting Union (EBU) split up the competing countries into six different pots based on voting patterns from previous contests, with countries with favourable voting histories put into the same pot. On 29 January 2018, a special allocation draw was held which placed each country into one of the two semi-finals, as well as which half of the show they would perform in. Russia was placed into the second semi-final, to be held on 10 May 2018, and was scheduled to perform in the first half of the show.

Once all the competing songs for the 2018 contest had been released, the running order for the semi-finals was decided by the shows' producers rather than through another draw, so that similar songs were not placed next to each other. Russia was set to perform in position 6, following the entry from Denmark and preceding the entry from Moldova.

After the end of the show, Russia was not announced among the top 10 entries of the second semi-final and therefore did not qualify to compete in the final. This marked the first time that Russia failed to qualify to the final of the Eurovision Song Contest from a semi-final since the introduction of semi-finals in 2004. It was later revealed that Russia placed 15th out of the 18 participating countries in the semi-final, receiving 65 points: 51 points from televoting and 14 points from juries.

=== Voting ===
Voting during the three shows involved each country awarding two sets of points from 1–8, 10 and 12: one from their professional jury and the other from televoting. Each nation's jury consisted of five music industry professionals who are citizens of the country they represent, with their names published before the contest to ensure transparency. This jury judged each entry based on: vocal capacity; the stage performance; the song's composition and originality; and the overall impression by the act. In addition, no member of a national jury was permitted to be related in any way to any of the competing acts in such a way that they cannot vote impartially and independently. The individual rankings of each jury member as well as the nation's televoting results were released shortly after the grand final.

==== Points awarded to Russia ====
Points awarded to Russia (Semi-final 2)
Score	Televote	Jury
12 points	Latvia	
10 points		
8 points	Moldova; Montenegro	
7 points	Serbia	Moldova
6 points	Georgia	
5 points		
4 points		Norway
3 points	Malta; Ukraine	France
2 points	Italy	
1 point	Romania; San Marino	

==== Points awarded by Russia ====
Points awarded by Russia (Semi-final 2)
Score	Televote	Jury
12 points	Moldova	Moldova
10 points	Ukraine	Norway
8 points	Norway	Sweden
7 points	Denmark	Serbia
6 points	Serbia	Ukraine
5 points	Sweden	Hungary
4 points	Hungary	Romania
3 points	Georgia	Australia
2 points	Slovenia	Poland
1 point	Australia	San Marino

Points awarded by Russia (Final)
Score	Televote	Jury
12 points	Moldova	Moldova
10 points	Israel	Sweden
8 points	Ukraine	Israel
7 points	Denmark	Cyprus
6 points	Italy	Estonia
5 points	Norway	Australia
4 points	Cyprus	Germany
3 points	Estonia	Lithuania
2 points	Czech Republic	France
1 point	Sweden	Italy

==== Detailed voting results ====
The following members comprised the Russian jury:

- Vladimir Matetsky (jury chairperson) – singer, songwriter, musician, record producer, author
- Yana Rudkovskaya – producer, manager
- Aleksandra Vorobyova – singer
- Sergey Mandrik – choreographer
- Alexey Manuylov – radio host

Detailed voting results from Russia (Semi-final 2)
R/O	Country	Jury							Televote	
R/O	Country	Y. Rudkovskaya	A. Vorobyova	V. Matetsky	S. Mandrik	A. Manuylov	Rank	Points	Rank	Points
01	Norway	2	2	3	2	3	2	10	3	8
02	Romania	8	11	13	6	6	7	4	17	
03	Serbia	3	8	2	5	2	4	7	5	6
04	San Marino	7	13	8	15	9	10	1	16	
05	Denmark	15	12	16	10	14	15		4	7
06	Russia									
07	Moldova	1	3	1	1	1	1	12	1	12
08	Netherlands	9	9	10	9	13	13		13	
09	Australia	14	4	12	7	12	8	3	10	1
10	Georgia	17	15	17	17	17	17		8	3
11	Poland	10	14	14	8	5	9	2	15	
12	Malta	11	10	11	11	7	11		14	
13	Hungary	12	6	5	14	8	6	5	7	4
14	Latvia	13	7	9	12	10	12		12	
15	Sweden	4	1	4	3	4	3	8	6	5
16	Montenegro	16	17	15	16	16	16		11	
17	Slovenia	6	16	7	13	15	14		9	2
18	Ukraine	5	5	6	4	11	5	6	2	10

Detailed voting results from Russia (Final)
R/O	Country	Jury							Televote	
R/O	Country	Y. Rudkovskaya	A. Vorobyova	V. Matetsky	S. Mandrik	A. Manuylov	Rank	Points	Rank	Points
01	Ukraine	13	13	15	14	16	15		3	8
02	Spain	21	26	24	18	21	24		25	
03	Slovenia	14	21	23	25	18	20		22	
04	Lithuania	9	8	8	9	6	8	3	18	
05	Austria	19	12	10	13	12	12		20	
06	Estonia	4	6	4	8	4	5	6	8	3
07	Norway	11	15	11	11	23	13		6	5
08	Portugal	26	24	26	26	20	26		26	
09	United Kingdom	25	22	18	19	17	21		24	
10	Serbia	8	14	16	12	14	11		12	
11	Germany	6	7	7	6	7	7	4	13	
12	Albania	24	23	14	15	24	19		23	
13	France	7	9	12	7	10	9	2	15	
14	Czech Republic	15	17	25	20	15	18		9	2
15	Denmark	12	11	20	16	11	14		4	7
16	Australia	5	5	5	5	9	6	5	21	
17	Finland	22	20	21	21	22	23		19	
18	Bulgaria	23	16	17	17	13	17		14	
19	Moldova	1	1	2	1	1	1	12	1	12
20	Sweden	2	2	1	2	3	2	10	10	1
21	Hungary	16	18	9	22	19	16		11	
22	Israel	3	3	6	3	5	3	8	2	10
23	Netherlands	20	19	19	23	25	22		17	
24	Ireland	18	25	22	24	26	25		16	
25	Cyprus	10	4	3	4	2	4	7	7	4
26	Italy	17	10	13	10	8	10	1	5	6
