= Eurovision Song Contest 2018 =

International song competition

- All Aboard!

Dates and venue
- Semi-final 1: 8 May 2018
- Semi-final 2: 10 May 2018
- Final: 12 May 2018
- Venue: Altice Arena; Lisbon, Portugal

Organisation
- Organiser: European Broadcasting Union (EBU)
- Executive supervisor: Jon Ola Sand

Production
- Host broadcaster: Rádio e Televisão de Portugal (RTP)
- Directors: Troels Lund; Paula Macedo; Pedro Miguel
- Executive producer: João Nuno Nogueira
- Presenters: Sílvia Alberto; Daniela Ruah; Catarina Furtado; Filomena Cautela

Participants
- Number of entries: 43
- Number of finalists: 26
- Returning countries: Russia
- Participation map: Finalist countries Countries eliminated in the semi-finals Countries that participated in the past but not in 2018

Vote
- Voting system: Each country awards two sets of 12, 10, 8–1 points to ten songs.
- Winning song: Israel "Toy"

The Eurovision Song Contest 2018 was the 63rd edition of the Eurovision Song Contest. It consisted of two semi-finals on 8 and 10 May and a final on 12 May 2018, held at the Altice Arena in Lisbon, Portugal, and presented by Filomena Cautela, Sílvia Alberto, Catarina Furtado, and Daniela Ruah. It was organised by the European Broadcasting Union (EBU) and host broadcaster Rádio e Televisão de Portugal (RTP), which staged the event after winning the 2017 contest for Portugal with the song "Amar pelos dois" by Salvador Sobral.

Broadcasters from forty-three countries participated in the contest, equalling the record of the 2008 and 2011 editions. Russia returned after its absence from the previous edition, and for the first time since 2011, no country that participated the previous year opted out.

The winner was Israel with the song "Toy", performed by Netta and written by Doron Medalie and Stav Beger. Cyprus, Austria, Germany, and Italy rounded out the top five, with Cyprus achieving its best result to date. Israel won the public vote, and came third in the jury vote behind Austria and Sweden. Further down the table, the Czech Republic also achieved its best result to date, finishing sixth. The EBU reported that 186 million viewers watched the contest, surpassing the previous edition by over 4 million.

== Location ==
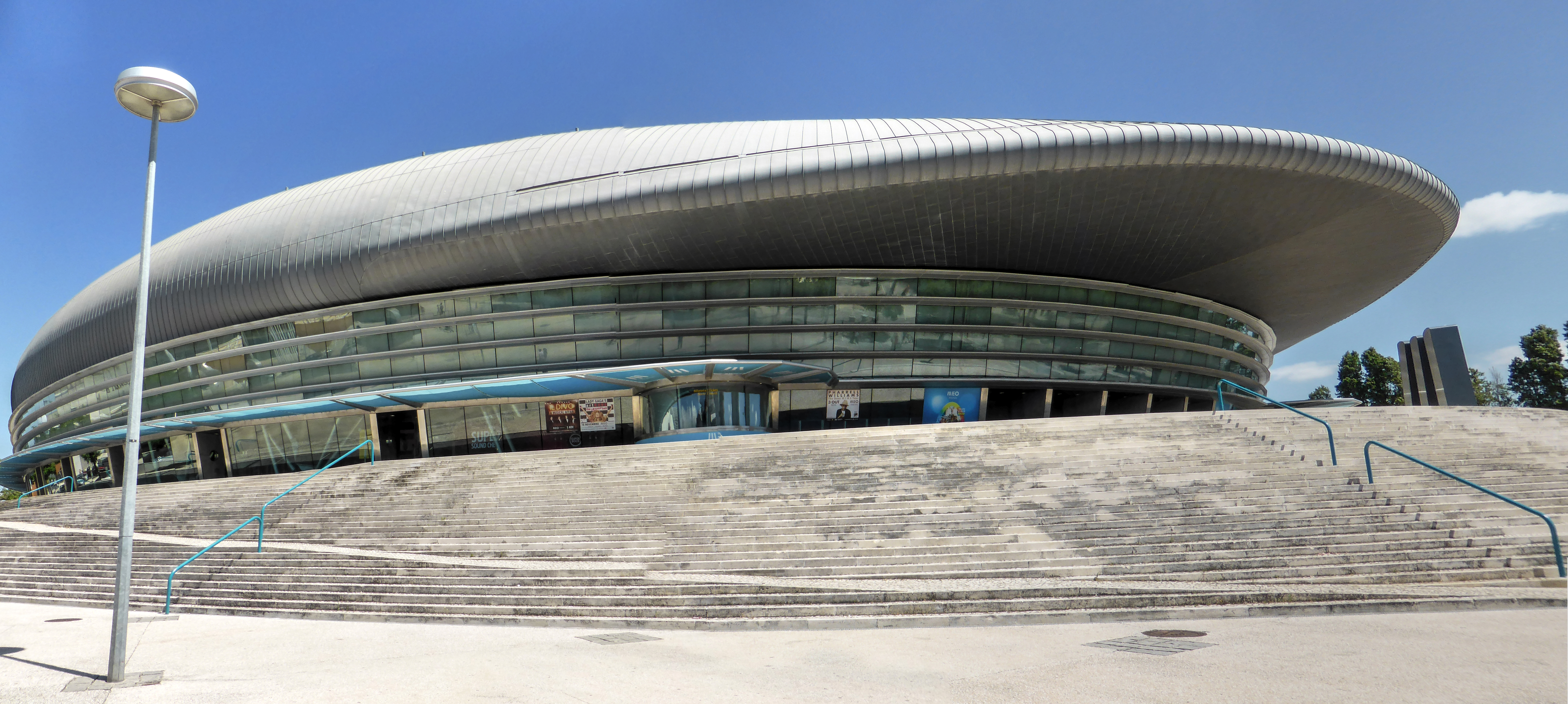
Altice Arena, host venue of the 2018 contest.

=== Venue ===
The Altice Arena (known as the "Lisbon Arena" during the contest) is a multi-purpose indoor arena built for the Expo '98 and has a capacity of 20,000 attendees, making it the largest indoor venue in Portugal and among the largest in Europe. It is located in the Parque das Nações (Park of Nations) riverside district in the northeast of Lisbon, which was completely renovated to host the 1998 world's fair. It is connected by metro to the nearby international airport and by train (Oriente Station) to the rest of the country and Europe.

=== Bidding phase ===
Locations of the candidate cities: the chosen host city is marked in blue, while the eliminated cities are marked in red.

On the day of the Eurovision Song Contest 2017 final, it was reported that Portuguese broadcaster Rádio e Televisão de Portugal (RTP) would accept the challenge of organising the 2018 contest in case of a victory. Following Sobral's triumph, the European Broadcasting Union (EBU)'s Executive Supervisor for the Eurovision Song Contest, Jon Ola Sand, issued the hosting invitation to RTP during the winner's press conference. The following day, the director-general of RTP, Nuno Artur Silva, confirmed that the broadcaster would organise the contest in 2018 and mentioned the Lisbon Arena as a likely venue to host the contest. On 15 May 2017, RTP appeared to have confirmed Lisbon as the host city, but clarified the following day that no final decision had been taken regarding both the host city and venue.

The basic requirements to select a host city were set out in a document presented by the EBU to RTP following their win in Kyiv:

- A suitable venue that can accommodate around 10,000 spectators.
- An international press centre for 1,500 journalists with adequate facilities for all the delegates.
- A good distribution of hotel rooms, at different price categories, able to accommodate at least 2,000 delegates, accredited journalists and spectators.
- An efficient transport infrastructure, including a nearby international airport with readily available connections with the city, venue, and hotels.

Besides Lisbon, other cities signalled their interest in bidding to host the 2018 contest: Braga, Espinho, Faro, Gondomar, Guimarães, and Santa Maria da Feira. The mayor of Porto, Rui Moreira, declared he would not be interested in "spending millions of euros" to host the contest, but he would support a bid from the Metropolitan Area of Porto (Espinho, Gondomar, and Santa Maria da Feira).

On 13 June 2017, RTP representatives met with the Eurovision Song Contest Reference Group at the EBU headquarters in Geneva. During the meeting, RTP officials attended a workshop covering several topics related with hosting the Eurovision Song Contest and learned from the experience of the Ukrainian broadcaster UA:PBC. They also had the opportunity to present their first plans for the 2018 contest, including multiple proposals for the host city and venue.

On 25 July 2017, the EBU and RTP announced that Lisbon had been selected as the host city, overcoming confirmed bids from Braga, Gondomar, Guimarães, and Santa Maria da Feira. In addition, RTP indicated the Parque das Nações, where the Lisbon Arena is located, as the site for the shows.

Key: † Host venue

City	Venue	Notes
Braga	Braga Exhibition Park	Agro-industrial park inaugurated in 1981 and further expanded in 1987 with a 6,500 m^{2} (70,000 sq ft) exhibition hall able to hold 3,000 people, and in 1990 with a congress centre and auditorium for 1,200 people. Renovation works starting in 2017 and ending in the first trimester of 2018 would increase the exhibition hall capacity to 15,000.
Gondomar	Multiusos de Gondomar Coração de Ouro	Multi-purpose indoor arena inaugurated in 2007, with a total capacity for 8,000 people (4,400 seats). Hosted the 2007 UEFA Futsal Championship final tournament.
Guimarães	Multiusos de Guimarães	Multi-purpose indoor arena inaugurated in 2001, with a total capacity for 10,000 people (3,000 seats). Selected by RTP to host the final of the national selection for the Eurovision Song Contest 2018, the Festival da Canção, on 4 March 2018.
Lisbon	Lisbon Arena †	Multi-purpose indoor arena inaugurated in 1998. It is the country's largest indoor venue, with a total capacity for 20,000 people (12,500 seats). Hosted the Expo '98, the 1999 FIBA Under-19 World Championship, the 2000 ATP Finals, the 2001 IAAF World Indoor Championships, the 2003 World Men's Handball Championship, the 2005 MTV Europe Music Awards, the UEFA Futsal Cup Final Four (2001–02, 2009–10 and 2014–15), and since 2016 (for a three-year period, renewable) the Web Summit.
Santa Maria da Feira	Europarque	Largest convention centre in the Porto Metropolitan Area, inaugurated in 1995. Hosted the European Council of June 2000, the Festival da Canção final in 2001, and the UEFA Euro 2004 final tournament draw. It was the option supported by the Metropolitan Council of Porto.

=== Other sites ===
Location of host venue (red) and other contest-related sites and events (blue)

The Eurovision Village was the official Eurovision Song Contest fan and sponsors area during the event weeks, where it was possible to watch performances by contest participants and local artists, as well as the live shows broadcast from the main venue. It was located in Lisbon's downtown Praça do Comércio (also called Terreiro do Paço), a large central square open to the Tagus river.

The EuroClub was the venue for the official after-parties and private performances by contest participants. Unlike the Eurovision Village, access to the EuroClub was restricted to accredited fans, delegations, and press. It was located at the "Ministerium" club, next to the Eurovision Village.

The "Blue Carpet" event, where all the contestants and their delegations are presented before the accredited press and fans, took place on 6 May 2018 at the Museum of Art, Architecture and Technology (MAAT) in Lisbon's Belém district. This preceded the official Opening Ceremony of the 2018 contest, which took place at the nearby Electricity Museum.

== Participants ==
Eurovision Song Contest 2018 – Participation summaries by country
- Albania; Armenia; Australia; Austria; Azerbaijan; Belarus; Belgium; Bulgaria; Croatia; Cyprus; Czech Republic; Denmark; Estonia; Finland; France; Georgia; Germany; Greece; Hungary; Iceland; Ireland; Israel; Italy; Latvia; Lithuania; Macedonia; Malta; Moldova; Montenegro; Netherlands; Norway; Poland; Portugal; Romania; Russia; San Marino; Serbia; Slovenia; Spain; Sweden; Switzerland; Ukraine; United Kingdom

Eligibility for participation in the Eurovision Song Contest requires a national broadcaster with active EBU membership, or a special invitation from the EBU as in the case of Australia.

It was initially announced on 7 November 2017 that forty-two countries would participate in the contest. Russia confirmed their return after their absence the previous edition, while Macedonia's participation was provisionally blocked by the EBU due to unpaid debts by Macedonian Radio Television (MRT). However, ten days later, it was announced that Macedonia would be allowed to enter the contest, raising the number of participating countries to forty-three, equaling the highest number of participants with the 2008 and 2011 editions.

The contest featured two representatives who also previously performed as lead vocalists for the same countries. Alexander Rybak won for Norway in 2009 performing "Fairytale" (and also sang entry No. 1500) and Waylon placed second for the Netherlands in 2014 as part of The Common Linnets performing "Calm After the Storm".

The contest also featured Jessica Mauboy, representing Australia, after taking part in 2014 as the interval act for the second semi-final, performing "Sea of Flags". In addition, the contest featured four lead singers previously participating as backing vocalists, two of them for the same countries. Lea Sirk backed for Slovenia in 2014 and off-stage in 2016, and Equinox member Vlado Mihailov backed for Bulgaria in 2017. Cesár Sampson, representing Austria, backed for Bulgaria in 2016 (also as a dancer) and off-stage in 2017. SuRie, representing the United Kingdom, backed for Belgium in 2015 (also as a dancer) and was the musical director again for Belgium in 2017. Sara Tavares, who performed in the interval act, represented Portugal in 1994, with the song "Chamar a música" reaching 8th place.

Eurovision Song Contest 2018 participants
Country	Broadcaster	Artist	Song	Language	Songwriter(s)
Albania	RTSH	Eugent Bushpepa	"Mall"	Albanian	Eugent Bushpepa
Armenia	AMPTV	Sevak Khanagyan	"Qami" (Քամի)	Armenian	Anna Danielyan; Sevak Khanagyan; Victoria Maloyan
Australia	SBS	Jessica Mauboy	"We Got Love"	English	Anthony Egizii; Jessica Mauboy; David Musumeci
Austria	ORF	Cesár Sampson	"Nobody but You"	English	Johan Alkenäs; Sebastian Arman; Borislav Milanov; Joacim Persson; Cesár Sampson
Azerbaijan	İTV	Aisel	"X My Heart"	English	Sandra Bjurman; Dimitris Kontopoulos
Belarus	BTRC	Alekseev	"Forever"	English	Yevgeny Matyushenko; Kirill Pavlov
Belgium	VRT	Sennek	"A Matter of Time"	English	Alex Callier; Laura Groeseneken; Maxime Tribeche
Bulgaria	BNT	Equinox	"Bones"	English	Brandon Treyshun Campbell; Dag Lundberg; Borislav Milanov; Joacim Persson
Croatia	HRT	Franka	"Crazy"	English	Franka Batelić; Branimir Mihaljević
Cyprus	CyBC	Eleni Foureira	"Fuego"	English	Didrick; Alex Papaconstantinou; Geraldo Sandell; Viktor Svensson; Anderz Wrethov
Czech Republic	ČT	Mikolas Josef	"Lie to Me"	English	Mikolas Josef
Denmark	DR	Rasmussen	"Higher Ground"	English	Niclas Arn; Karl Eurén
Estonia	ERR	Elina Nechayeva	"La forza"	Italian	Ksenia Kuchukova; Mihkel Mattisen; Elina Nechayeva; Timo Vendt
Finland	Yle	Saara Aalto	"Monsters"	English	Saara Aalto; Joy Deb; Linnea Deb; Ki Fitzgerald
France	France Télévisions	Madame Monsieur	"Mercy"	French	Jean-Karl Lucas; Émilie Satt
Georgia	GPB	Ethno-Jazz Band Iriao	"For You"	Georgian	David Malazonia; Mikheil Mdinaradze; Irina Sanikidze
Germany	NDR (Note: On behalf of the German public broadcasting consortium ARD)	Michael Schulte	"You Let Me Walk Alone"	English	Nisse Ingwersen; Katharina Müller; Michael Schulte; Thomas Stengaard
Greece	ERT	Yianna Terzi	"Oniro mou" (Όνειρό μου)	Greek	Aris Kalimeris; Michalis Papathanasiou; Dimitris Stamatiou; Yianna Terzi
Hungary	MTVA	AWS	"Viszlát nyár"	Hungarian	Bence Brucker; Dániel Kökényes; Soma Schiszler; Örs Siklósi; Áron Veress
Iceland	RÚV	Ari Ólafsson	"Our Choice"	English	Þórunn Clausen
Ireland	RTÉ	Ryan O'Shaughnessy	"Together"	English	Mark Caplice; Laura Elizabeth Hughes; Ryan O'Shaughnessy
Israel	IPBC	Netta	"Toy"	English	Stav Beger; Doron Medalie
Italy	RAI	Ermal Meta and Fabrizio Moro	"Non mi avete fatto niente"	Italian	Andrea Febo; Ermal Meta; Fabrizio Moro
Latvia	LTV	Laura Rizzotto	"Funny Girl"	English	Laura Rizzotto
Lithuania	LRT	Ieva Zasimauskaitė	"When We're Old"	English	Vytautas Bikus
Macedonia	MRT	Eye Cue	"Lost and Found"	English	Darko Dimitrov; Bojan Trajkovski
Malta	PBS	Christabelle	"Taboo"	English	Christabelle; Thomas G:son; Muxu; Johnny Sanchez
Moldova	TRM	DoReDoS	"My Lucky Day"	English	John Ballard; Philipp Kirkorov
Montenegro	RTCG	Vanja Radovanović	"Inje" (Иње)	Montenegrin	Vladimir Radovanović
Netherlands	AVROTROS	Waylon	"Outlaw in 'Em"	English	Jim Beavers; Ilya Toshinskiy; Waylon
Norway	NRK	Alexander Rybak	"That's How You Write a Song"	English	Alexander Rybak
Poland	TVP	Gromee feat. Lukas Meijer	"Light Me Up"	English	Andrzej Gromala; Lukas Meijer; Mahan Moin; Christian Rabb
Portugal	RTP	Cláudia Pascoal (Note: Performance contains uncredited live vocals from Isaura)	"O jardim"	Portuguese	Isaura
Romania	TVR	The Humans	"Goodbye"	English	Cristina Caramarcu; Alexandru Matei; Alin Neagoe
Russia	C1R	Julia Samoylova	"I Won't Break"	English	Arie Burshtein; Leonid Gutkin; Netta Nimrodi
San Marino	SMRTV	Jessika feat. Jenifer Brening	"Who We Are"	English	Jenifer Brening; Stefan Moessle; Mathias Strasser; Christof Straub; Zoë Straub
Serbia	RTS	Sanja Ilić and Balkanika	"Nova deca" (Нова деца)	Serbian	Aleksandar Sanja Ilić; Tatjana Karajanov Ilić; Danica Krstajić
Slovenia	RTVSLO	Lea Sirk	"Hvala, ne!"	Slovene	Tomy DeClerque; Lea Sirk
Spain	RTVE	Amaia and Alfred	"Tu canción"	Spanish	Raúl Gómez García; Sylvia Ruth Santoro López
Sweden	SVT	Benjamin Ingrosso	"Dance You Off"	English	Benjamin Ingrosso; MAG; K Nita; Louis Schoorl
Switzerland	SRG SSR	Zibbz	"Stones"	English	Laurell Barker; Herman Gardarfve; Corinne Gfeller; Stefan Gfeller
Ukraine	UA:PBC	Mélovin	"Under the Ladder"	English	Mélovin; Mike Ryals
United Kingdom	BBC	SuRie	"Storm"	English	Nicole Blair; Sean Hargreaves; Gil Lewis

=== Other countries ===
==== Active EBU members ====
Active EBU member broadcasters in Andorra, Luxembourg and Slovakia confirmed non-participation prior to the announcement of the participants list by the EBU. Despite hopes expressed by past Turkish representatives Sertab Erener (2003 winner), Hadise (2009) and maNga (2010), Deputy Prime Minister of Turkey Bekir Bozdağ and Turkish broadcaster TRT denied any plans for a return of the country.

==== Associate EBU members ====
Kazakh broadcaster Khabar Agency became an associate member of the EBU on 1 January 2016. This opened up the possibility of their participation since 2017, under the condition of a special invitation, as for Australia. The country was not invited in 2017 but broadcast all the shows. Turkvision Song Contest 2014 winner Zhanar Dugalova expressed interest in representing her country at the 2018 contest; however, the country was not invited in 2018 either and it did not appear on the final list of participants.

==== Non-EBU members ====
Kosovan broadcaster RTK, with the support of national broadcasters across the Balkans (except for Bosnia and Herzegovina and Serbia), expressed hopes to become an EBU member in order to debut at the 2018 contest; however, the EBU clarified that this was not possible due to the limited international recognition of Kosovo and the country not being a UN member.

== Production ==
=== Visual design ===
The theme for the contest, "All Aboard!", was unveiled on 7 November 2017 in a press conference held at the Lisbon Oceanarium. Its visual design features oceanic motifs that allude to Lisbon and Portugal's location on the Atlantic coast and to the country's seafaring history. Alongside the main emblem, which depicts a stylised seashell, twelve supplemental emblems were designed to symbolise different aspects of the marine ecosystem.

=== Stage design ===
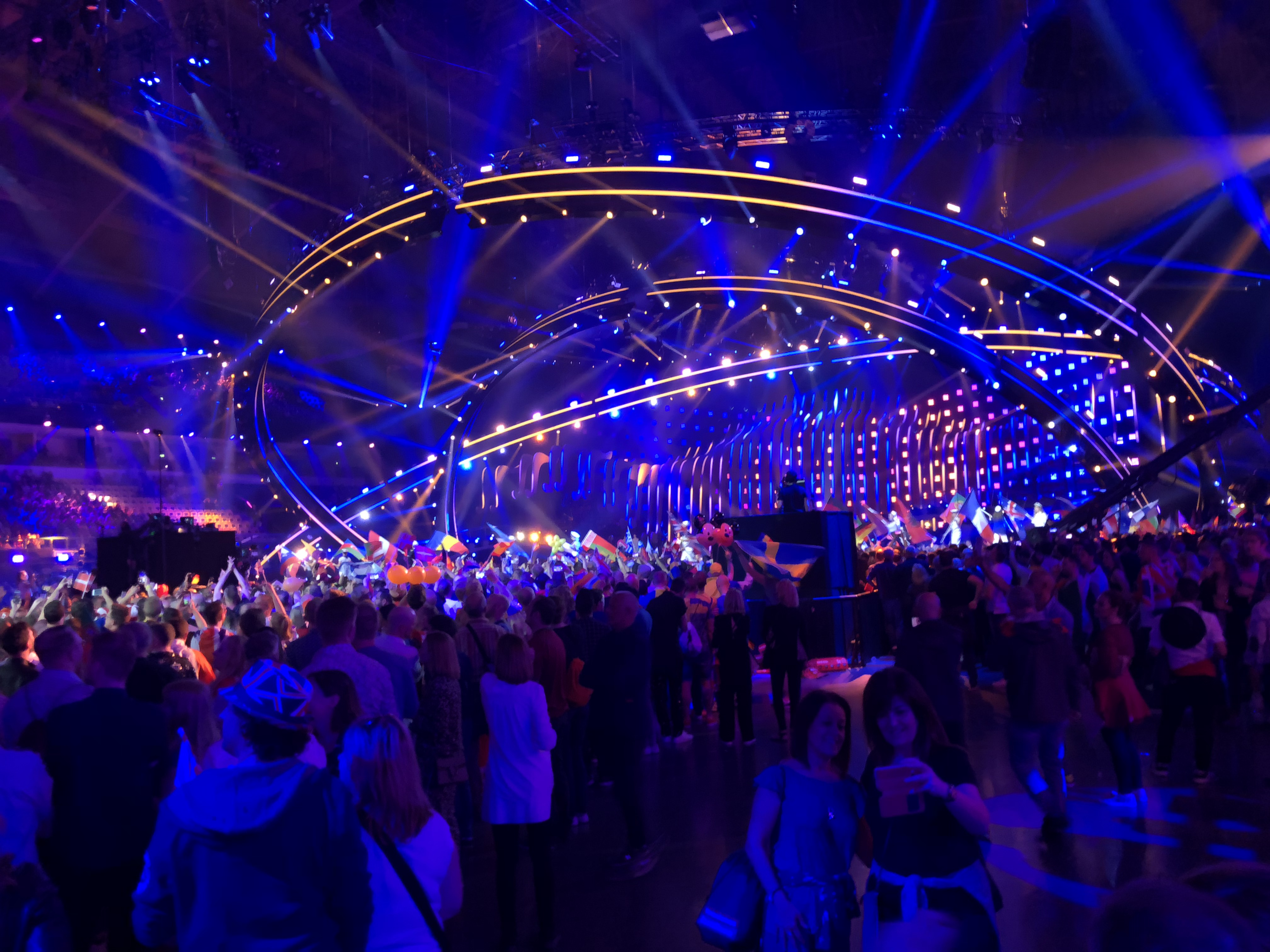
The stage in the arena

The stage design for the 2018 contest was revealed on 5 December 2017 and was designed by German production designer Florian Wieder, who also devised the stage concepts for the 2011–12, 2015 and 2017 contests. Drawing inspiration from Portugal's nautical heritage and culture, the circular stage consisted of a series of overhead LED edge-lit concentric circles depicting an armillary sphere, with 28 pairs of 4.5m × 13.5m vertical wooden 'ribs' at the rear of the stage to represent sea waves.

Unlike in previous years, RTP decided against implementing LED screens or projections into the stage design, influenced by the stage performance of "Amar pelos dois" the year prior and Sobral's comments upon receiving the winner's trophy, where he stated "music isn't fireworks, music is feeling." The decision was not embraced by all participating countries; some delegations opted to continue using video content, computer-generated graphics and "more [props] than ever before" during performances, which was met by mixed reaction.

=== Postcards ===
The postcards, filmed between March and April 2018, involved the act emerging from a door into Portugal to take part in a themed activity, such as mountain biking, making a salad or pastel de nata, or visiting popular attractions. The location where the activity took place was written in Portuguese at the start of the postcard. At the end of the postcard, the act posed for the camera, the slogan's hashtag appeared on the bottom corner of the screen, and song information was printed onto the country's flag. All the postcards had the same score, composed by Luis Figueredo.

- Albania – Aveiro
- Armenia – Grândola
- Australia – Lisbon
- Austria – Monsanto
- Azerbaijan – Monsaraz
- Belarus – Praça do Comércio, Lisbon
- Belgium – Tagus River, Lisbon
- Bulgaria – Lisbon
- Croatia – Talasnal
- Cyprus – Mercado da Ribeira
- Czech Republic – Podence
- Denmark – Mafra
- Estonia – Sintra
- Finland – Albufeira
- France – Viana do Castelo
- Georgia – Lisbon
- Germany – Calheta
- Greece – Ílhavo
- Hungary – Óbidos
- Iceland – Edward VII Park and Museu da Marioneta, Lisbon
- Ireland – Porto Santo Island
- Israel – A rooftop bar, Lisbon
- Italy – Porto
- Latvia – Benagil
- Lithuania – Caramulo
- Macedonia – Palace of the Marquises of Fronteira, Lisbon
- Malta – Alter do Chão
- Moldova – Vidago
- Montenegro – A flea market, Lisbon
- Netherlands – Lisbon
- Norway – Lisbon
- Poland – Ericeira
- Portugal – Tagus River
- Romania – Arouca
- Russia – Lisbon Oceanarium, Lisbon
- San Marino – Funchal
- Serbia – A winery, Porto
- Slovenia – Faial Island
- Spain – São Miguel Island
- Sweden – Serra da Estrela
- Switzerland – Porto
- Ukraine – Vila Nova de Milfontes
- United Kingdom – São Miguel Island

=== Presenters ===
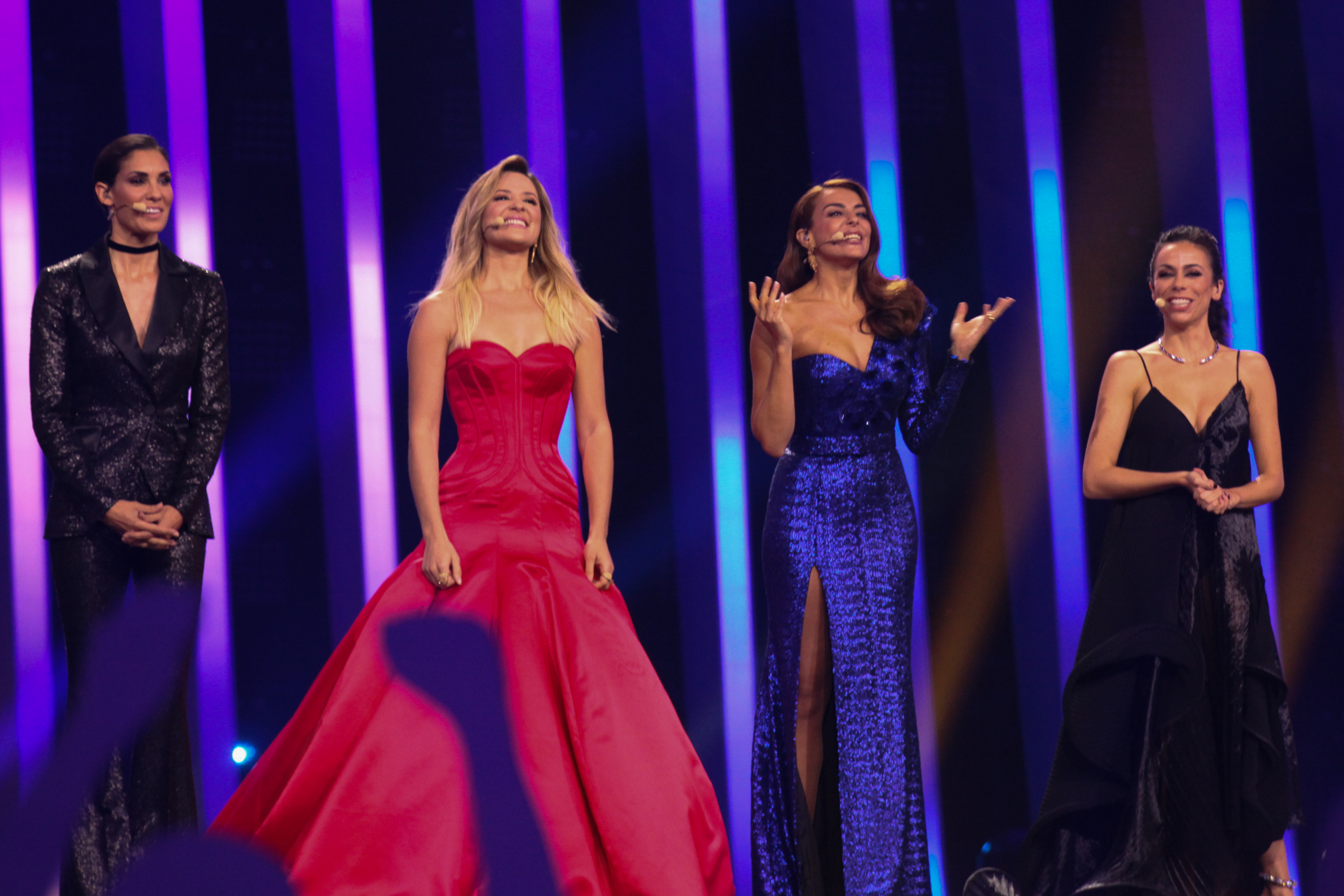
Presenters from left to right: Daniela Ruah, Sílvia Alberto, Catarina Furtado and Filomena Cautela

RTP and EBU announced on 8 January 2018, that the contest would be hosted for the first time by four female presenters, consisting of RTP hosts Sílvia Alberto, Filomena Cautela, and Catarina Furtado, together with actress Daniela Ruah. It was the first time since 2015 that the contest did not feature a male presenter, and the second consecutive year that the presenters were all the same gender. It was confirmed on 4 May 2018 that Cautela would also host the green room.

The Blue Carpet opening ceremony was hosted by actress Cláudia Semedo, radio host Inês Lopes Goncalves, actor/TV host Pedro Granger and actor/director Pedro Penim. Granger and Penim moderated the press conferences, as well.

== Format ==
=== Voting system changes ===
On 27 April 2018, the EBU announced changes to the jury voting system for the 2018 contest. Each ranking position between first and last would be assigned a predefined value, starting with the value of 12 for a first rank and decreasing exponentially for lower ranks. The sum of these scores for all twenty-six songs from the five jury members then create the national jury result for each participating country. The exponential weight model gives more weight to higher-ranked songs, thereby lessening the impact of an individual juror placing a song lower in their rankings on the final result.

=== Semi-final allocation draw ===
Results of the semi-final allocation draw Participating countries in the first semi-final Pre-qualified for the final but also voting in the first semi-final Participating countries in the second semi-final Pre-qualified for the final but also voting in the second semi-final

The draw to determine the allocation of the participating countries into their respective semi-finals took place on 29 January 2018 at 13:00 CET, at the Lisbon City Hall. The thirty-seven semi-finalists were divided over six pots, based on historical voting patterns as calculated by the contest's official televoting partner Digame. The purpose of drawing from different pots was to reduce the chance of "bloc voting" and to increase suspense in the semi-finals. The draw also determined which semi-final each of the six automatic qualifiers – host country Portugal and "Big Five" countries France, Germany, Italy, Spain and the United Kingdom – would broadcast and vote in. The ceremony was hosted by contest presenters Sílvia Alberto and Filomena Cautela, and included the passing of the host city insignia from Vitali Klitschko, mayor of Kyiv (host city of the previous contest) to Fernando Medina, mayor of Lisbon.

With the approval from the contest's reference group, Italy broadcast and voted in the second semi-final following a request from Italian broadcaster RAI, as the date of the first semi-final coincided with the scheduled final of the fifth season of The Voice of Italy.

Pot 1	Pot 2	Pot 3	Pot 4	Pot 5	Pot 6
Albania; Croatia; Macedonia; Montenegro; Serbia; Slovenia; Switzerland	Denmark; Finland; Iceland; Ireland; Norway; Sweden	Armenia; Azerbaijan; Belarus; Georgia; Russia; Ukraine	Bulgaria; Cyprus; Greece; Hungary; Moldova; Romania	Australia; Austria; Czech Republic; Israel; Malta; San Marino	Belgium; Estonia; Latvia; Lithuania; Netherlands; Poland

== Contest overview ==
=== Semi-final 1 ===
The first semi-final took place on 8 May 2018 at 20:00 WEST (21:00 CEST). Nineteen countries participated in this semi-final, with the running order published on 3 April 2018. Israel won the most points, followed by Cyprus, the Czech Republic, Austria, Estonia, Ireland, Bulgaria, Albania, Lithuania and Finland. The countries that failed to reach the final were Azerbaijan, Belgium, Switzerland, Greece, Armenia, Belarus, Croatia, Macedonia, and Iceland. All the countries competing in this semi-final were eligible to vote, plus Portugal, Spain, and the United Kingdom.

The interval, which solely consisted of pre-recorded segments, included a performance of "Amar pelos dois" by 2017 entrants Alma, Blanche, Kristian Kostov, Manel Navarro, Martina Bárta, Norma John, and Svala; "Planet Portugal", a video sketch inspired by National Geographic featuring Herman José; and "Esclopedia", a video skit about the contest's history. The Portuguese, Spanish and British artists were then interviewed, and clips of their competing songs were played.

Qualifiers

Results of the first semi-final of the Eurovision Song Contest 2018
R/O	Country	Artist	Song	Points	Place
1	Azerbaijan	Aisel	"X My Heart"	94	11
2	Iceland	Ari Ólafsson	"Our Choice"	15	19
3	Albania	Eugent Bushpepa	"Mall"	162	8
4	Belgium	Sennek	"A Matter of Time"	91	12
5	Czech Republic	Mikolas Josef	"Lie to Me"	232	3
6	Lithuania	Ieva Zasimauskaitė	"When We're Old"	119	9
7	Israel	Netta	"Toy"	283	1
8	Belarus	Alekseev	"Forever"	65	16
9	Estonia	Elina Nechayeva	"La forza"	201	5
10	Bulgaria	Equinox	"Bones"	177	7
11	Macedonia	Eye Cue	"Lost and Found"	24	18
12	Croatia	Franka	"Crazy"	63	17
13	Austria	Cesár Sampson	"Nobody but You"	231	4
14	Greece	Yianna Terzi	"Oniro mou"	81	14
15	Finland	Saara Aalto	"Monsters"	108	10
16	Armenia	Sevak Khanagyan	"Qami"	79	15
17	Switzerland	Zibbz	"Stones"	86	13
18	Ireland	Ryan O'Shaughnessy	"Together"	179	6
19	Cyprus	Eleni Foureira	"Fuego"	262	2

=== Semi-final 2 ===
The second semi-final took place on 10 May 2018 at 20:00 WEST (21:00 CEST). Eighteen countries participated in this semi-final, with the running order published on 3 April 2018. Norway won the most points, followed by Sweden, Moldova, Australia, Denmark, Ukraine, Netherlands, Slovenia, Serbia, and Hungary. The countries that failed to reach the final were Romania, Latvia, Malta, Poland, Russia, Montenegro, San Marino, and Georgia. All the countries competing in this semi-final were eligible to vote, plus France, Germany and Italy.

The interval acts included a dance medley of "Puppet on a String", "Dschinghis Khan", "Making Your Mind Up", "Euphoria", and Riverdance, performed by the presenters; a pre-recorded segment depicting the recording of the postcards; a short documentary about the 1974 Portuguese entry "E depois do adeus" and its impact on the Carnation Revolution; plus new instalments of "Esclopedia" and "Planet Portugal". The French, German and Italian artists were then interviewed, and clips of their competing songs were played.

Qualifiers

Results of the second semi-final of the Eurovision Song Contest 2018
R/O	Country	Artist	Song	Points	Place
1	Norway	Alexander Rybak	"That's How You Write a Song"	266	1
2	Romania	The Humans	"Goodbye"	107	11
3	Serbia	Sanja Ilić and Balkanika	"Nova deca"	117	9
4	San Marino	Jessika feat. Jenifer Brening	"Who We Are"	28	17
5	Denmark	Rasmussen	"Higher Ground"	204	5
6	Russia	Julia Samoylova	"I Won't Break"	65	15
7	Moldova	DoReDoS	"My Lucky Day"	235	3
8	Netherlands	Waylon	"Outlaw in 'Em"	174	7
9	Australia	Jessica Mauboy	"We Got Love"	212	4
10	Georgia	Ethno-Jazz Band Iriao	"For You"	24	18
11	Poland	Gromee feat. Lukas Meijer	"Light Me Up"	81	14
12	Malta	Christabelle	"Taboo"	101	13
13	Hungary	AWS	"Viszlát nyár"	111	10
14	Latvia	Laura Rizzotto	"Funny Girl"	106	12
15	Sweden	Benjamin Ingrosso	"Dance You Off"	254	2
16	Montenegro	Vanja Radovanović	"Inje"	40	16
17	Slovenia	Lea Sirk	"Hvala, ne!"	132	8
18	Ukraine	Mélovin	"Under the Ladder"	179	6

=== Final ===
The final took place on 12 May 2018 at 20:00 WEST (21:00 CEST). Twenty-six countries participated in the final, with all forty-three participating countries eligible to vote. The running order for the final was published on 10 May 2018. Israel won the contest with the song "Toy", performed by Netta and written by Doron Medalie and Stav Beger. Israel won with 529 points, also winning the televote. Cyprus came second with 436 points, with Austria (who won the jury vote), Germany, Italy, the Czech Republic, Sweden, Estonia, Denmark, and Moldova completing the top ten. Slovenia, Spain, United Kingdom, Finland, and Portugal occupied the bottom five positions.

The final was opened by Portuguese fado singers Ana Moura and Mariza performing "Fado loucura" and "Barco negro" respectively. This was followed by the flag parade, introducing all twenty-six finalists, accompanied with music by Portuguese scratching duo Beatbombers. The interval acts included a medley of "Ter peito e espaço", "Nova Lisboa", and "Reserva pra dois", performed by DJ Branko and featuring Sara Tavares & Plutónio, Dino D'Santiago, and Mayra Andrade respectively; a video sketch about the history of Portugal in the Eurovision Song Contest, featuring Suzy; an interview with Polina Bogusevich, winner of the Junior Eurovision Song Contest 2017; and Salvador Sobral, who performed his new single "Mano a mano" and his winning song "Amar pelos dois", the latter in a duet with Brazilian singer Caetano Veloso, with both songs featuring piano accompaniment by Júlio Resende.

Winner

Results of the final of the Eurovision Song Contest 2018
R/O	Country	Artist	Song	Points	Place
1	Ukraine	Mélovin	"Under the Ladder"	130	17
2	Spain	Amaia and Alfred	"Tu canción"	61	23
3	Slovenia	Lea Sirk	"Hvala, ne!"	64	22
4	Lithuania	Ieva Zasimauskaitė	"When We're Old"	181	12
5	Austria	Cesár Sampson	"Nobody but You"	342	3
6	Estonia	Elina Nechayeva	"La forza"	245	8
7	Norway	Alexander Rybak	"That's How You Write a Song"	144	15
8	Portugal	Cláudia Pascoal	"O jardim"	39	26
9	United Kingdom	SuRie	"Storm"	48	24
10	Serbia	Sanja Ilić and Balkanika	"Nova deca"	113	19
11	Germany	Michael Schulte	"You Let Me Walk Alone"	340	4
12	Albania	Eugent Bushpepa	"Mall"	184	11
13	France	Madame Monsieur	"Mercy"	173	13
14	Czech Republic	Mikolas Josef	"Lie to Me"	281	6
15	Denmark	Rasmussen	"Higher Ground"	226	9
16	Australia	Jessica Mauboy	"We Got Love"	99	20
17	Finland	Saara Aalto	"Monsters"	46	25
18	Bulgaria	Equinox	"Bones"	166	14
19	Moldova	DoReDoS	"My Lucky Day"	209	10
20	Sweden	Benjamin Ingrosso	"Dance You Off"	274	7
21	Hungary	AWS	"Viszlát nyár"	93	21
22	Israel	Netta	"Toy"	529	1
23	Netherlands	Waylon	"Outlaw in 'Em"	121	18
24	Ireland	Ryan O'Shaughnessy	"Together"	136	16
25	Cyprus	Eleni Foureira	"Fuego"	436	2
26	Italy	Ermal Meta and Fabrizio Moro	"Non mi avete fatto niente"	308	5

==== Spokespersons ====
The spokespersons announced the 12-point score from their respective country's national jury in the following order:

1. Ukraine – Natalia Zhyzhchenko
2. Azerbaijan – Tural Asadov
3. Belarus – Naviband
4. San Marino – John Kennedy O'Connor
5. Netherlands – OG3NE
6. Macedonia – Jana Burčeska
7. Malta – Lara Azzopardi
8. Georgia – Tamara Gachechiladze
9. Spain – Nieves Álvarez
10. Austria – Kati Bellowitsch
11. Denmark – Ulla Essendrop
12. United Kingdom – Mel Giedroyc
13. Sweden – Felix Sandman
14. Latvia – Dagmāra Legante
15. Albania – Andri Xhahu
16. Croatia – Uršula Tolj
17. Ireland – Nicky Byrne
18. Romania – Sonia Argint-Ionescu
19. Czech Republic – Radka Rosická
20. Iceland – Edda Sif Pálsdóttir
21. Moldova – Djulieta Ardovan
22. Belgium – Danira Boukhriss
23. Norway – Aleksander Walmann and Jowst
24. France – Élodie Gossuin
25. Italy – Giulia Valentina Palermo
26. Australia – Ricardo Gonçalves
27. Estonia – Ott Evestus
28. Serbia – Dragana Kosjerina
29. Cyprus – Hovig
30. Armenia – Arsen Grigoryan
31. Bulgaria – Joanna Dragneva
32. Greece – Olina Xenopoulou
33. Hungary – Bence Forró
34. Montenegro – Nataša Šotra
35. Germany – Barbara Schöneberger
36. Finland – Anna Abreu
37. Russia – Alsou
38. Switzerland – Letícia Carvalho
39. Israel – Lucy Ayoub
40. Poland – Mateusz Szymkowiak
41. Lithuania – Eglė Daugėlaitė
42. Slovenia – Maja Keuc
43. Portugal – Pedro Fernandes

== Detailed voting results ==
=== Semi-final 1 ===
Split results of semi-final 1
Place	Combined		Jury		Televoting	
Place	Country	Points	Country	Points	Country	Points
1	Israel	283	Israel	167	Cyprus	173
2	Cyprus	262	Austria	115	Czech Republic	134
3	Czech Republic	232	Albania	114	Estonia	120
4	Austria	231	Bulgaria	107	Israel	116
5	Estonia	201	Czech Republic	98	Austria	116
6	Ireland	179	Cyprus	89	Ireland	108
7	Bulgaria	177	Estonia	81	Finland	73
8	Albania	162	Ireland	71	Bulgaria	70
9	Lithuania	119	Belgium	71	Lithuania	62
10	Finland	108	Switzerland	59	Greece	53
11	Azerbaijan	94	Lithuania	57	Albania	48
12	Belgium	91	Azerbaijan	47	Azerbaijan	47
13	Switzerland	86	Croatia	46	Belarus	45
14	Greece	81	Armenia	38	Armenia	41
15	Armenia	79	Finland	35	Switzerland	27
16	Belarus	65	Greece	28	Belgium	20
17	Croatia	63	Belarus	20	Croatia	17
18	Macedonia	24	Macedonia	18	Macedonia	6
19	Iceland	15	Iceland	15	Iceland	0

The ten qualifiers from the first semi-final were determined by televoting and/or SMS-voting (50%) and five-member juries (50%). All nineteen countries competing in the first semi-final voted, alongside Portugal, Spain, and the United Kingdom. The ten qualifying countries were announced in no particular order, and the full results of how each country voted was published after the final had been held.

Qualifiers

Detailed jury voting results of semi-final 1
Voting procedure used: 100% televoting; 100% jury vote		Total score	Jury score	Televoting score	Jury vote																					
Voting procedure used: 100% televoting; 100% jury vote		Total score	Jury score	Televoting score	Azerbaijan	Iceland	Albania	Belgium	Czech Republic	Lithuania	Israel	Belarus	Estonia	Bulgaria	Macedonia	Croatia	Austria	Greece	Finland	Armenia	Switzerland	Ireland	Cyprus	Portugal	Spain	United Kingdom
Contestants	Azerbaijan	94	47	47			5				10		3		7			12					10			
Contestants	Iceland	15	15	0				1	4			7			2						1					
Contestants	Albania	162	114	48	7	12		4	5	1	4	12	1	6	10	4	6	8	6	5			7	5	4	7
Contestants	Belgium	91	71	20		2	4		10	8			4	12		1	7		5	6		2		10		
Contestants	Czech Republic	232	98	134		5		10		5	3	10		7	8	10	8	2		7	8	4	1	3	7	
Contestants	Lithuania	119	57	62			1		3		2		10	10		8	2		2		7			12		
Contestants	Israel	283	167	116	4	10	10	7	12	7		6		5	5	12	12	4	12	12	5	10	12	2	12	8
Contestants	Belarus	65	20	45	12		7													1						
Contestants	Estonia	201	81	120	1	6				4					4		3	10		8	12	8	5	8	6	6
Contestants	Bulgaria	177	107	70	2		6	2	7	3		5	7		12	6	4	6	10		3	6	6	7	3	12
Contestants	Macedonia	24	18	6	6		8				1							3								
Contestants	Croatia	63	46	17	5						6	8	2	4	6			5					4	1		5
Contestants	Austria	231	115	116		7		12	1	10	12	1	12	8					8	4	6	7	3	6	8	10
Contestants	Greece	81	28	53	10	1	3									3				2		1	8			
Contestants	Finland	108	35	73		4				2	7	3	5	1							2	5	2		1	3
Contestants	Armenia	79	38	41				6	2		5	4		2			10		3					4		2
Contestants	Switzerland	86	59	27	3	3	2	8	6	6	8					5	1	1	1	3		3			5	4
Contestants	Ireland	179	71	108		8		5	8	12		2	6		1	7	5		4		10				2	1
Contestants	Cyprus	262	89	173	8		12	3					8	3	3	2		7	7	10	4	12			10	

Detailed televoting results of semi-final 1
Voting procedure used: 100% televoting; 100% jury vote		Total score	Jury score	Televoting score	Televote																					
Voting procedure used: 100% televoting; 100% jury vote		Total score	Jury score	Televoting score	Azerbaijan	Iceland	Albania	Belgium	Czech Republic	Lithuania	Israel	Belarus	Estonia	Bulgaria	Macedonia	Croatia	Austria	Greece	Finland	Armenia	Switzerland	Ireland	Cyprus	Portugal	Spain	United Kingdom
Contestants	Azerbaijan	94	47	47		1	7		10		5				5	5	4	3						7		
Contestants	Iceland	15	15	0																						
Contestants	Albania	162	114	48					3						12	4	1	10	1		10	1			5	1
Contestants	Belgium	91	71	20	2					8	2	2	3							3						
Contestants	Czech Republic	232	98	134	8	12	2	8		7	12	8	7	3	6	10	10	6	7	7	3	4	7	1	4	2
Contestants	Lithuania	119	57	62	1	3		4				6	10						2			12	3	6	3	12
Contestants	Israel	283	167	116	10	8	4	3	12	1		10	1	7	3		6	2	10	4	8	5	8	2	7	5
Contestants	Belarus	65	20	45	12					6			6	2				1	3	10			5			
Contestants	Estonia	201	81	120	3	6	6	5	5	12	7	3		4		6	3	8	12	5	1	10	6	12	2	4
Contestants	Bulgaria	177	107	70	4		5		2	2	3	5			8		5	7		2		3	10		8	6
Contestants	Macedonia	24	18	6										5		1										
Contestants	Croatia	63	46	17											10		2			1	4					
Contestants	Austria	231	115	116	5	7	3	10	6	10	8	4	8	8		7			8	6	12	8	1	5		
Contestants	Greece	81	28	53			10	1						10	4	3				8	2		12			3
Contestants	Finland	108	35	73		10	8	2	1	3	6		12	1	2						5	6		4	6	7
Contestants	Armenia	79	38	41				6	8			12		6				5					4			
Contestants	Switzerland	86	59	27		2	1				1		2		1	2	8		4			2		3	1	
Contestants	Ireland	179	71	108	6	4		12	4	4	4	1	5			8	12	4	6		6		2	8	12	10
Contestants	Cyprus	262	89	173	7	5	12	7	7	5	10	7	4	12	7	12	7	12	5	12	7	7		10	10	8

==== 12 points ====
Below is a summary of all 12 points received in the first semi-final. In the jury vote, Israel received the maximum score of 12 points from seven countries, with Austria receiving three sets of 12 points. Albania, Bulgaria, and Cyprus were awarded two sets of 12 points each, and Azerbaijan, Belarus, Belgium, Estonia, Ireland, and Lithuania were each awarded one set of 12 points. In the public vote, Cyprus received the maximum score of 12 points from five countries, with Estonia and Ireland receiving three sets of 12 points. Czech Republic and Lithuania were awarded two sets of 12 points each, and Albania, Armenia, Austria, Belarus, Finland, Greece, and Israel were each awarded one set of 12 points.

12 points awarded by juries
N.	Contestant	Nation(s) giving 12 points
7	Israel	Armenia, Austria, Croatia, Cyprus, Czech Republic, Finland, Spain
3	Austria	Belgium, Estonia, Israel
2	Albania	Belarus, Iceland
2	Bulgaria	Macedonia, United Kingdom
2	Cyprus	Albania, Ireland
1	Azerbaijan	Greece
1	Belarus	Azerbaijan
1	Belgium	Bulgaria
1	Estonia	Switzerland
1	Ireland	Lithuania
1	Lithuania	Portugal

12 points awarded by televoting
N.	Contestant	Nation(s) giving 12 points
5	Cyprus	Albania, Armenia, Bulgaria, Croatia, Greece
3	Estonia	Finland, Lithuania, Portugal
3	Ireland	Austria, Belgium, Spain
2	Czech Republic	Iceland, Israel
2	Lithuania	Ireland, United Kingdom
1	Albania	Macedonia
1	Armenia	Belarus
1	Austria	Switzerland
1	Belarus	Azerbaijan
1	Finland	Estonia
1	Greece	Cyprus
1	Israel	Czech Republic

=== Semi-final 2 ===
Split results of semi-final 2
Place	Combined results		Jury		Televoting	
Place	Country	Points	Country	Points	Country	Points
1	Norway	266	Sweden	171	Denmark	164
2	Sweden	254	Norway	133	Moldova	153
3	Moldova	235	Australia	130	Norway	133
4	Australia	212	Netherlands	127	Ukraine	114
5	Denmark	204	Malta	93	Hungary	88
6	Ukraine	179	Latvia	92	Sweden	83
7	Netherlands	174	Moldova	82	Australia	82
8	Slovenia	132	Slovenia	67	Serbia	72
9	Serbia	117	Romania	67	Slovenia	65
10	Hungary	111	Ukraine	65	Poland	60
11	Romania	107	Serbia	45	Russia	51
12	Latvia	106	Denmark	40	Netherlands	47
13	Malta	101	Hungary	23	Romania	40
14	Poland	81	Montenegro	23	Montenegro	17
15	Russia	65	Poland	21	Latvia	14
16	Montenegro	40	San Marino	14	San Marino	14
17	San Marino	28	Russia	14	Georgia	13
18	Georgia	24	Georgia	11	Malta	8

The ten qualifiers from the second semi-final were determined by televoting and/or SMS-voting (50%) and five-member juries (50%). All eighteen countries competing in the second semi-final voted, alongside France, Germany, and Italy. The ten qualifying countries were announced in no particular order, and the full results of how each country voted was published after the final had been held.

Qualifiers

Detailed jury voting results of semi-final 2
Voting procedure used: 100% televoting; 100% jury vote		Total score	Jury score	Televoting score	Jury vote																				
Voting procedure used: 100% televoting; 100% jury vote		Total score	Jury score	Televoting score	Norway	Romania	Serbia	San Marino	Denmark	Russia	Moldova	Netherlands	Australia	Georgia	Poland	Malta	Hungary	Latvia	Sweden	Montenegro	Slovenia	Ukraine	France	Germany	Italy
Contestants	Norway	266	133	133		2	8	7	6	10	4	10	8	5	4	12	7	5	12	6	7	1	2	5	12
Contestants	Romania	107	67	40	2		1			4	12	2		6	3	2	12	3	3	8	6	2	1		
Contestants	Serbia	117	45	72		6		6	1	7						1	6			12	4			1	1
Contestants	San Marino	28	14	14		5				1						3									5
Contestants	Denmark	204	40	164			5				1		6			8	5			1		4			10
Contestants	Russia	65	14	51	4						7												3		
Contestants	Moldova	235	82	153		12		10	2	12		3	10	3		4		6	2	5	5			4	4
Contestants	Netherlands	174	127	47	8	8	10	4	5		5		1	10	10		8	8	6	4	10	12	8	7	3
Contestants	Australia	212	130	82	10		6		12	3	10	4			8	7	10	12	10	3	2	6	12	8	7
Contestants	Georgia	24	11	13													1	2				8			
Contestants	Poland	81	21	60	1			2		2		5					4		1				4	2	
Contestants	Malta	101	93	8	6	10	4	8	8		2	1	3	4	1			7	4	7	8		6	6	8
Contestants	Hungary	111	23	88		3				5			4	2	6						3				
Contestants	Latvia	106	92	14	7	1	3	5	7		3	7	5	8	7		2		7			10	10	10	
Contestants	Sweden	254	171	83	12		12	12	10	8		12	12	12	12	10	3	10		2	12	7	7	12	6
Contestants	Montenegro	40	23	17		7	7									5					1	3			
Contestants	Slovenia	132	67	65	5	4	2	3	4		6	8	2	1	5			4	8			5	5	3	2
Contestants	Ukraine	179	65	114	3			1	3	6	8	6	7	7	2	6		1	5	10					

Detailed televoting results of semi-final 2
Voting procedure used: 100% televoting; 100% jury vote		Total score	Jury score	Televoting score	Televote																				
Voting procedure used: 100% televoting; 100% jury vote		Total score	Jury score	Televoting score	Norway	Romania	Serbia	San Marino	Denmark	Russia	Moldova	Netherlands	Australia	Georgia	Poland	Malta	Hungary	Latvia	Sweden	Montenegro	Slovenia	Ukraine	France	Germany	Italy
Contestants	Norway	266	133	133		6	6	7	12	8	6	10	6	5	7	6	8	4	10	5	10	8	4	4	1
Contestants	Romania	107	67	40							12			8									8		12
Contestants	Serbia	117	45	72	1	4				6	10	1					2		4	12	12		10	6	4
Contestants	San Marino	28	14	14									2			12									
Contestants	Denmark	204	40	164	12	8	4	12		7	4	12	12	3	8	8	12	7	12	3	8	10	5	10	7
Contestants	Russia	65	14	51		1	7	1			8			6		3		12		8		3			2
Contestants	Moldova	235	82	153	5	12	5	6	6	12		7	10	12	2	4	10	8	5	4	6	12	12	5	10
Contestants	Netherlands	174	127	47	7	3		2	7		3		1	1	1	5	4	1	6	2	1			3	
Contestants	Australia	212	130	82	8	7	3	4	8	1	5	4			3	10	3	2	7		4		6	7	
Contestants	Georgia	24	11	13						3								5				5			
Contestants	Poland	81	21	60	6				4			5				1	7		8			7	7	12	3
Contestants	Malta	101	93	8					1				7												
Contestants	Hungary	111	23	88	2	10	12	8		4	1	8	3	4	10			3	1	1	5	2		8	6
Contestants	Latvia	106	92	14					2					7	4							1			
Contestants	Sweden	254	171	83	10	2	1	5	10	5	2	6	8	2	5	7	1	6		6	2	4	1		
Contestants	Montenegro	40	23	17			10														7				
Contestants	Slovenia	132	67	65	3		8	3	3	2		3	4		6		5		3	10		6	2	2	5
Contestants	Ukraine	179	65	114	4	5	2	10	5	10	7	2	5	10	12	2	6	10	2	7	3		3	1	8

==== 12 points ====
Below is a summary of all 12 points received in the second semi-final. In the jury vote, Sweden received the maximum score of 12 points from nine countries, with Australia and Norway receiving three sets of 12 points. Moldova and Romania were awarded two sets of 12 points each, and the Netherlands and Serbia were each awarded one set of 12 points. In the public vote, Denmark received the maximum score of 12 points from six countries, with Moldova receiving five sets of 12 points. Romania and Serbia were awarded two sets of 12 points each, and Hungary, Norway, Poland, Russia, San Marino, and Ukraine were each awarded one set of 12 points.

12 points awarded by juries
N.	Contestant	Nation(s) giving 12 points
9	Sweden	Australia, Georgia, Germany, Netherlands, Norway, Poland, San Marino, Serbia, Slovenia
3	Australia	Denmark, France, Latvia
3	Norway	Italy, Malta, Sweden
2	Moldova	Romania, Russia
2	Romania	Hungary, Moldova
1	Netherlands	Ukraine
1	Serbia	Montenegro

12 points awarded by televoting
N.	Contestant	Nation(s) giving 12 points
6	Denmark	Australia, Hungary, Netherlands, Norway, San Marino, Sweden
5	Moldova	France, Georgia, Romania, Russia, Ukraine
2	Romania	Italy, Moldova
2	Serbia	Montenegro, Slovenia
1	Hungary	Serbia
1	Norway	Denmark
1	Poland	Germany
1	Russia	Latvia
1	San Marino	Malta
1	Ukraine	Poland

=== Final ===
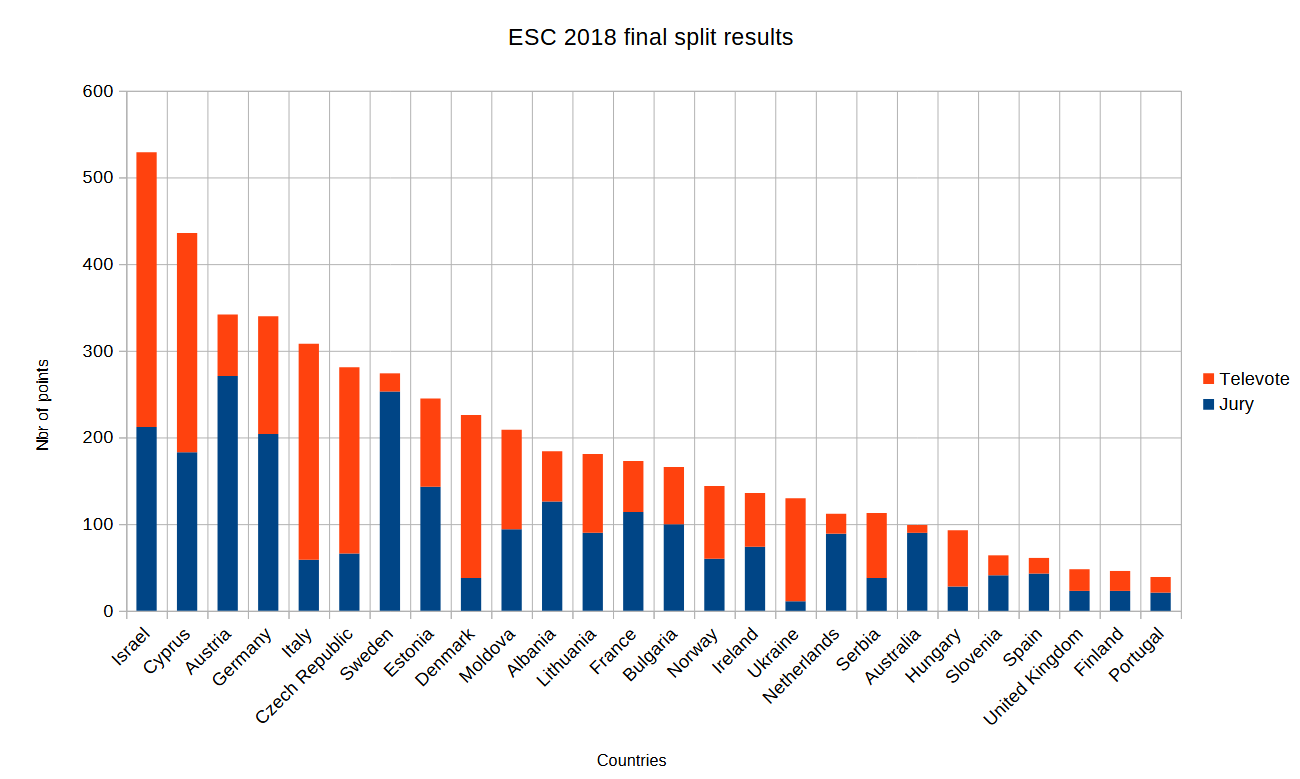
Diagram of the split results of the grand final of Eurovision Song Contest 2018, with jury and televote points separated

Split results of the final
Place	Combined		Jury		Televoting	
Place	Country	Points	Country	Points	Country	Points
1	Israel	529	Austria	271	Israel	317
2	Cyprus	436	Sweden	253	Cyprus	253
3	Austria	342	Israel	212	Italy	249
4	Germany	340	Germany	204	Czech Republic	215
5	Italy	308	Cyprus	183	Denmark	188
6	Czech Republic	281	Estonia	143	Germany	136
7	Sweden	274	Albania	126	Ukraine	119
8	Estonia	245	France	114	Moldova	115
9	Denmark	226	Bulgaria	100	Estonia	102
10	Moldova	209	Moldova	94	Lithuania	91
11	Albania	184	Lithuania	90	Norway	84
12	Lithuania	181	Australia	90	Serbia	75
13	France	173	Netherlands	89	Austria	71
14	Bulgaria	166	Ireland	74	Bulgaria	66
15	Norway	144	Czech Republic	66	Hungary	65
16	Ireland	136	Norway	60	Ireland	62
17	Ukraine	130	Italy	59	France	59
18	Netherlands	121	Spain	43	Albania	58
19	Serbia	113	Slovenia	41	Netherlands	32
20	Australia	99	Denmark	38	United Kingdom	25
21	Hungary	93	Serbia	38	Finland	23
22	Slovenia	64	Hungary	28	Slovenia	23
23	Spain	61	United Kingdom	23	Sweden	21
24	United Kingdom	48	Finland	23	Spain	18
25	Finland	46	Portugal	21	Portugal	18
26	Portugal	39	Ukraine	11	Australia	9

The results of the final were determined by televoting and jury voting in all forty-three participating countries. The announcement of the jury points was conducted by each country individually, with the country's spokesperson announcing their jury's favourite entry that received 12 points, with the remaining points shown on screen. Following the completion of the jury points announcement, the public points were announced as an aggregate by the contest hosts in ascending order starting from the country which received the fewest points from the televoting.

Winner

Detailed jury voting results of the final
Voting procedure used: 100% televoting; 100% jury vote		Total score	Jury score	Televoting score	Jury vote																																										
Voting procedure used: 100% televoting; 100% jury vote		Total score	Jury score	Televoting score	Ukraine	Azerbaijan	Belarus	San Marino	Netherlands	Macedonia	Malta	Georgia	Spain	Austria	Denmark	United Kingdom	Sweden	Latvia	Albania	Croatia	Ireland	Romania	Czech Republic	Iceland	Moldova	Belgium	Norway	France	Italy	Australia	Estonia	Serbia	Cyprus	Armenia	Bulgaria	Greece	Hungary	Montenegro	Germany	Finland	Russia	Switzerland	Israel	Poland	Lithuania	Slovenia	Portugal
Contestants	Ukraine	130	11	119		6																			5																						
Contestants	Spain	61	43	18											6	1					1	10				1	2			7			7						6								2
Contestants	Slovenia	64	41	23	5		4	6	1	2				5				1				1	7					2															4				3
Contestants	Lithuania	181	90	91			5		7			2						4		12		6	1				3			3	10				10		5		4		3	8		1			6
Contestants	Austria	342	271	71	7		10		10		1	8	8		8	12	10	7			5	12	5	12	3	12	8	7	7	5	12	4	2	1	12		8		10	7		4	12	12	12	10	8
Contestants	Estonia	245	143	102	1	3		5	4	12		10	1	2	7	6		8			3	3		7	12				4	8		3	1			3		5	2		6	10				5	12
Contestants	Norway	144	60	84			8		3		4					5	2			5					2				12		4	6					2	7									
Contestants	Portugal	39	21	18					2												6										3											3			7		
Contestants	United Kingdom	48	23	25														2		2								3	6									2					8				
Contestants	Serbia	113	38	75		10		3		8									3																	2		12									
Contestants	Germany	340	204	136		2		10	12	3		7	7	10	12		1	3	6		8	4		6	4	5	12	8	10	10	6	10		5	6					1	4	12	5	10	5		
Contestants	Albania	184	126	58		12	7			6		4		7		7				1	2		6	10		2						1	6		7	7	10	10						7		4	10
Contestants	France	173	114	59	12						8		6		2		5	10	7	6	4			3		3	7						3	4	5	5				5	2				10	2	5
Contestants	Czech Republic	281	66	215	4		6			4	5		4	3					1	4				1		7		4		1			5	6	8											3	
Contestants	Denmark	226	38	188	3		3					1																	8								12	6		3			2				
Contestants	Australia	99	90	9	2		2	2			3				10		8	6				2			7		6	10						2			7		7		5		7	4			
Contestants	Finland	46	23	23						5						4	3						3								2												6				
Contestants	Bulgaria	166	100	66		5					2	6		6	1	8	6		8	7	10		4		8						7									10		2	1	2			7
Contestants	Moldova	209	94	115		7		7											2	8		7								2		5	10	10		10		8			12					6	
Contestants	Sweden	274	253	21	6		1	8	8	7	7	12	2	8	4	2		12	4				8	5		8	10	5	1	12	5	12	12	12	2	8	1		12	8	10	5	10	6	8	12	
Contestants	Hungary	93	28	65		8																	2										4			6							3	3	2		
Contestants	Israel	529	212	317	10	1		12	5	1	6	3	10	12	3	10	7		5	10	7		12	8	10	6		12	2	6		2		8	4	4	6		1	12	8	1			6	1	1
Contestants	Netherlands	121	89	32	8							5		1				5				8			1	10	4	6			1	7		3			4	3	5					8	3	7	
Contestants	Ireland	136	74	62				1					5	4		3	4			3			10	4			1	1	5	4					1		3		8	2		6		5	4		
Contestants	Cyprus	436	183	253		4	12		6	10	12		12		5		12		10		12	5		2	6	4	5		3		8			7	3	12		1	3	6	7	7			1	8	
Contestants	Italy	308	59	249				4			10		3						12													8	8			1		4		4	1						4

Detailed televoting results of the final
Voting procedure used: 100% televoting; 100% jury vote		Total score	Jury score	Televoting score	Televote																																										
Voting procedure used: 100% televoting; 100% jury vote		Total score	Jury score	Televoting score	Ukraine	Azerbaijan	Belarus	San Marino	Netherlands	Macedonia	Malta	Georgia	Spain	Austria	Denmark	United Kingdom	Sweden	Latvia	Albania	Croatia	Ireland	Romania	Czech Republic	Iceland	Moldova	Belgium	Norway	France	Italy	Australia	Estonia	Serbia	Cyprus	Armenia	Bulgaria	Greece	Hungary	Montenegro	Germany	Finland	Russia	Switzerland	Israel	Poland	Lithuania	Slovenia	Portugal
Contestants	Ukraine	130	11	119		8	12	5		4		8						3					12		10			4	8				2	4	1			7			8		7	12			4
Contestants	Spain	61	43	18																								5														1					12
Contestants	Slovenia	64	41	23						2										7												8						6									
Contestants	Lithuania	181	90	91	2						5	7				12	7	12			12						12				12		6						4								
Contestants	Austria	342	271	71					3			1			10		2		2					5		3	8				6			6	4		3		5	3		4	1		3	2	
Contestants	Estonia	245	143	102	3							6	2					10	4		4		5		1			7	6				4	2	2	4				12	3		8		12		7
Contestants	Norway	144	60	84		7	10		1				3		8		8	2						4	5					1	2	3	5	7		3	5				5					5	
Contestants	Portugal	39	21	18																								8														10					
Contestants	United Kingdom	48	23	25				1			1				3				3		10									6									1								
Contestants	Serbia	113	38	75						10				8						12								1	1						7			12				12				12	
Contestants	Germany	340	204	136		3		4	12		4		6	6	12	3	5		8	3	8	4	3	8	4	2	6		3	2			3			2	1					6	3	1	2	4	8
Contestants	Albania	184	126	58						12				2						4									12							10		10				7				1	
Contestants	France	173	114	59	7							4	4						5					6		8	1						1	5						4			6	3	5		
Contestants	Czech Republic	281	66	215	10	6	5	10	6	5	3		10	12	6	5	3	4		5	7	3		10	6	1	4			3	5	5	8	8	3	7	8		8	5	2		12	4	8	8	
Contestants	Denmark	226	38	188	8		7	6	8		2	2		5		2	12	5		2	2	2	7	12		5	10	2	4	10	8	4					12		3	10	7	2	4	6	10	7	2
Contestants	Australia	99	90	9							6				2	1																															
Contestants	Finland	46	23	23													6							3						4	10																
Contestants	Bulgaria	166	100	66		1	1			7	7		5			6			6	1		5	1		3							2	12			5		4									
Contestants	Moldova	209	94	115	6	4	6	2		1		3				4		7			1	12	6					6	10	5	1	1		1	8	1	2				12		10				6
Contestants	Sweden	274	253	21		2									7									2			3											2			1				4		
Contestants	Hungary	93	28	65	1		2		2					3								10			2				2		3	12			5			3	2	8				7		3	
Contestants	Israel	529	212	317	12	12	8	12	10	3	8	12	12	7		7	10	8	1	6	6	8	10	7	12	10	7	12	7	12		7	10	10	10	6	10	1	10	7	10	5		10	1		1
Contestants	Netherlands	121	89	32											5		1				3					12	5										4			2							
Contestants	Ireland	136	74	62				3	4				1	4	4	10			7			1	4			4				8									7					2			3
Contestants	Cyprus	436	183	253	4	10	3	7	5	8	10	10	8	1	1	8	4	1	10	8	5	7	8	1	7	7	2	3	5	7	4	10		12	12	12	7	5	6	1	4	3	2	8	6	6	5
Contestants	Italy	308	59	249	5	5	4	8	7	6	12	5	7	10				6	12	10		6	2		8	6		10			7	6	7	3	6	8	6	8	12	6	6	8	5	5	7	10	10

==== 12 points ====
Below is a summary of all 12 points received in the final. In the jury vote, Austria received the maximum score of 12 points from nine countries, with Sweden receiving eight sets of 12 points. Cyprus received the maximum score from six countries, Israel was awarded five sets of 12 points, and Germany received four sets of 12 points. Estonia was awarded two sets of 12 points each, and Albania, Denmark, France, Italy, Lithuania, Moldova, Norway, and Serbia were each awarded one set of 12 points.

In the public vote, Israel received the maximum score of 12 points from eight countries, with Lithuania receiving five sets of 12 points. Serbia received the maximum score from four countries, and Cyprus, Denmark, Italy, and Ukraine were each awarded three sets of 12 points. Albania, Czech Republic, Estonia, Germany, and Moldova received two sets of maximum scores each, and Bulgaria, Hungary, the Netherlands, and Spain were each awarded one set of 12 points.

12 points awarded by juries
N.	Contestant	Nation(s) giving 12 points
9	Austria	Belgium, Bulgaria, Estonia, Iceland, Israel, Lithuania, Poland, Romania, United Kingdom
8	Sweden	Armenia, Australia, Cyprus, Georgia, Germany, Latvia, Serbia, Slovenia
6	Cyprus	Belarus, Greece, Ireland, Malta, Spain, Sweden
5	Israel	Austria, Czech Republic, Finland, France, San Marino
4	Germany	Denmark, Netherlands, Norway, Switzerland
3	Estonia	Macedonia, Moldova, Portugal
1	Albania	Azerbaijan
1	Denmark	Hungary
1	France	Ukraine
1	Italy	Albania
1	Lithuania	Croatia
1	Moldova	Russia
1	Norway	Italy
1	Serbia	Montenegro

12 points awarded by televoting
N.	Contestant	Nation(s) giving 12 points
8	Israel	Australia, Azerbaijan, France, Georgia, Moldova, San Marino, Spain, Ukraine
5	Lithuania	Estonia, Ireland, Latvia, Norway, United Kingdom
4	Serbia	Croatia, Montenegro, Slovenia, Switzerland
3	Cyprus	Armenia, Bulgaria, Greece
3	Denmark	Hungary, Iceland, Sweden
3	Italy	Albania, Germany, Malta
3	Ukraine	Belarus, Czech Republic, Poland
2	Albania	Italy, Macedonia
2	Czech Republic	Austria, Israel
2	Estonia	Finland, Lithuania
2	Germany	Denmark, Netherlands
2	Moldova	Romania, Russia
1	Bulgaria	Cyprus
1	Hungary	Serbia
1	Netherlands	Belgium
1	Spain	Portugal

== Broadcasts ==
The European Broadcasting Union provided international live streams with no commentary of both semi-finals and the final through their official YouTube channel. The live streams were geo-blocked to viewers in Bolivia, Canada, Costa Rica, Dominican Republic, Ecuador, El Salvador, Guatemala, Honduras, Nicaragua, Panama, Paraguay, United States, Uruguay and Venezuela due to rights limitations.

Countries may add commentary from commentators working on-location or remotely at the broadcaster. Commentators can add insight to the participating entries and the provision of voting information.

Broadcasters and commentators in participating countries
Country	Broadcaster	Channel(s)	Show(s)	Commentator(s)	Ref(s)
Albania	RTSH	RTSH, RTSH Muzikë, Radio Tirana	All shows	Andri Xhahu	
Armenia	AMPTV	Armenia 1, Public Radio of Armenia	All shows	Avet Barseghyan and Felix Khachatryan	
Australia	SBS	SBS	All shows	Myf Warhurst and Joel Creasey	
Austria	ORF	ORF eins	All shows	Andi Knoll	
Azerbaijan	İTV		All shows	Azer Suleymanli	
Belarus	BTRC	Belarus-1, Belarus 24	All shows	Evgeny Perlin	
Belgium	VRT	één	All shows	Peter Van de Veire	
Belgium	RTBF	La Une	All shows (Note: While the first semi-final and final aired live, the second semi-final aired with a 90-minute delay.)	Jean-Louis Lahaye and Maureen Louys	
Bulgaria	BNT	BNT 1	All shows	Elena Rosberg and Georgi Kushvaliev	
Croatia	HRT	HRT 1, HR 2	All shows	Duško Ćurlić	
Cyprus	CyBC	CyBC	All shows	Costas Constantinou and Vaso Komninou	
Czech Republic	ČT	ČT2	Semi-finals	Libor Bouček	
Czech Republic	ČT	ČT1	Final	Libor Bouček	
Denmark	DR	DR1	All shows	Ole Tøpholm	
Estonia	ERR	ETV	All shows	Marko Reikop	
Estonia	ERR	ETV+	All shows	Aleksandr Hobotov and Julia Kalenda	
Estonia	ERR	Raadio 2	SF1/Final	Mart Juur and Andrus Kivirähk	
Finland	Yle	Yle TV2	All shows	Finnish: Mikko Silvennoinen; Swedish: Eva Frantz and Johan Lindroos	
Finland	Yle	Yle TV2	SF2	Finnish: Saara Aalto	
Finland	Yle	Yle Radio Suomi	All shows	Anna Keränen	
Finland	Yle	Yle Radio Suomi	Final	Aija Puurtinen and Sami Sykkö	
Finland	Yle	Yle X3M	All shows	Eva Frantz and Johan Lindroos	
France	France Télévisions	France 4	Semi-finals	Christophe Willem and André Manoukian	
France	France Télévisions	France 2	Final	Stéphane Bern, Christophe Willem and Alma	
Georgia	GPB	1TV	All shows	Demetre Ergemlidze	
Germany	ARD	One	All shows	Peter Urban	
Germany	ARD	Das Erste, Deutsche Welle	Final	Peter Urban	
Greece	ERT	ERT2, ERT HD	All shows	Alexandros Lizardos and Daphne Skalioni	
Greece	ERT	Deftero Programma, Voice of Greece	All shows	Dimitris Meidanis	
Hungary	MTVA	Duna	All shows	Krisztina Rátonyi and Freddie	
Iceland	RÚV	RÚV	All shows	Gísli Marteinn Baldursson	
Ireland	RTÉ	RTÉ2	Semi-finals	Marty Whelan	
Ireland	RTÉ	RTÉ One	Final	Marty Whelan	
Ireland	RTÉ	RTÉ Radio 1	SF1	Neil Doherty and Zbyszek Zalinski	
Ireland	RTÉ	RTÉ 2fm	Final	Neil Doherty and Zbyszek Zalinski	
Israel	IPBC	Kan 11, Kan 88	SF1	Asaf Liberman and Shir Reuven	
Israel	IPBC	Kan 11, Kan 88	SF2	Itai Herman and Goel Pinto	
Israel	IPBC	Kan 11, Kan 88	Final	Erez Tal and Idit Hershkowitz	
Italy	RAI	Rai 4	Semi-finals	Carolina Di Domenico and Saverio Raimondo	
Italy	RAI	Rai 1	Final	Serena Rossi and Federico Russo	
Italy	RAI	Rai Radio 2	Final	Carolina Di Domenico and Ema Stokholma	
Latvia	LTV	LTV1	Semi-finals	Toms Grēviņš	
Latvia	LTV	LTV1	Final	Toms Grēviņš and Magnuss Eriņš	
Lithuania	LRT	LRT, LRT Radijas	All shows	Darius Užkuraitis and Gerūta Griniūtė	
Macedonia	MRT	MRT 1, MRT 2	All shows	Karolina Petkovska	
Malta	PBS	TVM	All shows	—N/a	
Moldova	TRM	Moldova 1, Radio Moldova	All shows	—N/a	
Montenegro	RTCG	TVCG 1, TVCG Sat	All shows	Dražen Bauković and Tijana Mišković	
Netherlands	AVROTROS	NPO 1	All shows	Jan Smit and Cornald Maas	
Norway	NRK	NRK1	All shows	Olav Viksmo-Slettan	
Norway	NRK	NRK3	Final	Ronny Brede Aase, Silje Nordnes and Markus Neby	
Norway	NRK	NRK P1	Final	Ole-Christian Øen	
Poland	TVP	TVP1, TVP Polonia	All shows	Artur Orzech	
Portugal	RTP	RTP1, RTP Internacional	All shows	Hélder Reis and Nuno Galopim	
Portugal	RTP	Antena 1, RDP África, RDP Internacional	Final	Noémia Gonçalves, António Macedo and Tozé Brito	
Romania	TVR	TVR 1, TVR HD, TVRi	All shows	Liliana Ștefan and Radu Andrei Tudor	
Russia	C1R	Channel One	All shows (Note: Channel One aired the first semi-final on a 90-minute delay while the second semi-final and the grand final was aired live.)	Yana Churikova and Yuriy Aksyuta	
San Marino	SMRTV	San Marino RTV, Radio San Marino	All shows	Lia Fiorio and Gigi Restivo	
Serbia	RTS	RTS1, RTS HD, RTS SAT, RTS Planeta	SF1	Silvana Grujić and Tamara Petković	
Serbia	RTS	RTS1, RTS HD, RTS SAT, RTS Planeta	SF2/Final	Duška Vučinić	
Serbia	RTS	Radio Beograd 1	SF2/Final	Katarina Epstein and Nataša Raketić	
Slovenia	RTVSLO	TV SLO 2	Semi-finals	Andrej Hofer	
Slovenia	RTVSLO	TV SLO 1	Final	Andrej Hofer	
Spain	RTVE	La 2	Semi-finals	Tony Aguilar and Julia Varela	
Spain	RTVE	La 1	Final	Tony Aguilar and Julia Varela	
Sweden	SVT	SVT1	All shows	Sanna Nielsen and Edward af Sillén	
Switzerland	SRG SSR	SRF zwei	Semi-finals	Sven Epiney	
Switzerland	SRG SSR	SRF 1	Final	Sven Epiney	
Switzerland	SRG SSR	RTS Deux	SF2	Jean-Marc Richard and Nicolas Tanner	
Switzerland	SRG SSR	RTS Un	Final	Jean-Marc Richard and Nicolas Tanner	
Switzerland	SRG SSR	RSI La 2	Semi-finals	Clarissa Tami	
Switzerland	SRG SSR	RSI La 1	Final	Clarissa Tami	
Ukraine	UA:PBC	STB	All shows	Serhiy Prytula	
Ukraine	UA:PBC	UA:First	SF1	Timur Miroshnychenko and Mariya Yaremchuk	
Ukraine	UA:PBC	UA:First	SF2	Timur Miroshnychenko and Alyosha	
Ukraine	UA:PBC	UA:First	Final	Timur Miroshnychenko and Jamala	
United Kingdom	BBC	BBC Four	Semi-finals	Scott Mills and Rylan Clark-Neal	
United Kingdom	BBC	BBC One	Final	Graham Norton	
United Kingdom	BBC	BBC Radio 2	Final	Ken Bruce	

Broadcasters and commentators in non-participating countries
Country/Territory	Broadcaster	Channel(s)	Show(s)	Commentator(s)	Ref(s)
China	HBS	Mango TV	SF1	Duan Yixuan and Hei Nan	(Note: Mango TV, an online video streaming platform, was initially scheduled to transmit all three shows in China. After showing the first semi-final on a nine-hour delay the European Broadcasting Union (EBU) terminated their agreement with Mango TV and banned the service from transmitting the second semi-final and grand final in China due to its censorship of the first semi-final.)
Kazakhstan	Khabar	Khabar TV	All shows	Diana Snegina and Kaldybek Zhaysanbay	
Kosovo	RTK		All shows	Alma Bektashi and Agron Krasniqi	
Slovakia	RTVS	Rádio FM	Final	Daniel Baláž, Pavol Hubinák, Juraj Malíček, Ela Tolstová and Celeste Buckingham	
United States	Viacom	Logo TV	Final	Ross Mathews and Shangela	
United States	WJFD-FM		Final	English: Ewan Spence and Lisa-Jayne Lewis; Portuguese: Ana Filipa Rosa	

== Incidents and controversies ==
=== Accusations of cultural appropriation ===
Following eventual winner Netta's performance of her song "Toy", critics of the song accused Netta of appropriating Japanese culture, with several users taking to social media to call the performance "offensive". The accusations were made after she wore a kimono and buns, as well as Maneki-nekos being shown during the performance.

The topic was debated on British morning show Good Morning Britain on 14 May 2018 in response, with television presenters Trisha Goddard and Piers Morgan defending Netta by stating that she was simply implementing elements of Japanese culture due to her own appreciation of it. English journalist Rebecca Reid disagreed, arguing, "It's not a beautiful, loving representation of real Japanese culture. It's a costume".

=== Belarusian song submission ===
On 10 January 2018, it had emerged on Russian social media site VK that Alekseev had performed a Russian-language version of his EuroFest entry "Forever" (as "Navsegda") in May 2017 in Stavropol – before 1 September 2017, the submission deadline set by the EBU, potentially violating the rules of the contest. Six artists threatened to withdraw from the selection if it were allowed to compete, with Sofi Lapina actually doing so. Alekseev was ultimately allowed to compete by BTRC following a melodic revamp of the song, and went on to win the selection, thus earning the right to represent Belarus in the contest. However, on 23 February 2018, it was reported that the EBU had given Alekseev permission to perform his original English-language version of the song at the contest, and he would opt to sing that version of the song in May. A few weeks after that announcement, on 28 March 2018, Alekseev premiered a new version of his entry with a lighter intro and additional choir at the end of the track. He also confirmed that this version would be the one performed in Lisbon.

=== Czech rehearsal injuries ===
On 29 April 2018, during the first rehearsal of the Czech Republic's performance, Mikolas Josef reportedly sustained injuries to his back while rehearsing and was hospitalised. Josef subsequently posted an update on his Instagram, stating, "I can confirm that I got injured during the rehearsal and the situation got worse after several hours. I can't even walk now. Got back from the first hospital and I am now heading to another one". He also stated that he would, however, "perform no matter what". Josef's performance in the first semi-final on 8 May was slightly altered to accommodate his injuries.

=== Censorship in the Chinese broadcast ===
During the Chinese broadcast of the first semi-final on Mango TV, the performances of Albania and Ireland were edited out of the show, along with their snippets in the recap of all 19 entries. Albania was cut due to a ban on television performers displaying tattoos that took effect in January 2018, while Ireland was censored due to its representation of a homosexual couple onstage. In addition, the LGBT flag and tattoos on other performers were also blurred out from the broadcast. As a result, the EBU terminated its partnership with Mango TV, citing that censorship "is not in line with the EBU's values of universality and inclusivity and its proud tradition of celebrating diversity through music," which led to a ban on televising the second semi-final and the final in the country. A spokesperson for the broadcaster's owner Hunan TV said they "weren't aware" of the edits made to the programme. Ireland's representative Ryan O'Shaughnessy told the BBC in an interview that "they haven't taken this lightly and I think it's a move in the right direction, so I'm happy about it."

=== United Kingdom stage invasion ===
The performance of SuRie, who represented the United Kingdom, in the final was disrupted by a man who rushed onto the stage and grabbed her microphone, reportedly shouting "For the Nazis of the UK media, we demand freedom! War is not peace." The man, later identified as 'Dr ACactivism', a political activist from London, climbed into a camera run to get access to the stage. SuRie was able to complete her performance, and after the song the broadcast cut to an unscheduled interview in the green room. The EBU offered SuRie and her team the opportunity to perform again, but she declined. SuRie later revealed that she had suffered several bruises on her right hand. Shortly after the live broadcast on YouTube, the final was taken down and reuploaded in its entirety, with SuRie's interrupted performance edited out and substituted with her jury show performance from the previous evening. The official reupload also retains the unscheduled green room interview with the Ukrainian delegation that followed the stage invasion. The official DVD release also replaces the interrupted final performance with the previous evening's jury show performance. However, the BBC uploaded the original performance, including the stage invasion, to its YouTube channel.

== Other awards ==
In addition to the main winner's trophy, the Marcel Bezençon Awards and the Barbara Dex Award were contested during the 2018 Eurovision Song Contest. The OGAE, "General Organisation of Eurovision Fans" voting poll also took place before the contest.

=== Marcel Bezençon Awards ===
The Marcel Bezençon Awards, organised since 2002 by Sweden's then-Head of Delegation and 1992 representative Christer Björkman, and 1984 winner Richard Herrey, honours songs in the contest's final. The awards are divided into three categories: Artistic Award, Composers Award, and Press Award. The winners were revealed shortly before the Eurovision final on 12 May.

Category	Country	Song	Artist	Songwriter(s)
Artistic Award	Cyprus	"Fuego"	Eleni Foureira	Alex Papaconstantinou; Geraldo Sandell; Viktor Svensson; Anderz Wrethov; Didrick
Composers Award	Bulgaria	"Bones"	Equinox	Borislav Milanov; Trey Campbell; Joacim Persson; Dag Lundberg
Press Award	France	"Mercy"	Madame Monsieur	Émilie Satt; Jean-Karl Lucas

=== OGAE ===
OGAE, an organisation of over forty Eurovision Song Contest fan clubs across Europe and beyond, conducts an annual voting poll first held in 2002 as the Marcel Bezençon Fan Award. After all votes were cast, the top-ranked entry in the 2018 poll was also the winner of the contest, "Toy" performed by Netta; the top five results are shown below.

Country	Song	Artist	Points
Israel	"Toy"	Netta	456
France	"Mercy"	Madame Monsieur	352
Finland	"Monsters"	Saara Aalto	226
Australia	"We Got Love"	Jessica Mauboy	202
Czech Republic	"Lie to Me"	Mikolas Josef	181

=== Barbara Dex Award ===
The Barbara Dex Award is a humorous fan award given to the worst dressed artist each year. Named after Belgium's representative who came last in the 1993 contest, wearing her self-designed dress, the award was handed by the fansite House of Eurovision from 1997 to 2016 and is being carried out by the fansite Songfestival.be since 2017.

Place	Country	Artist
1	Macedonia	Eye Cue
2	Australia	Jessica Mauboy
3	Belgium	Sennek
4	Montenegro	Vanja Radovanović
5	Israel	Netta

== Official album ==
Cover art of the official album

Eurovision Song Contest: Lisbon 2018 is the official compilation album of the contest, put together by the European Broadcasting Union and released by Universal Music Group digitally on 6 April 2018 and physically on 20 April 2018. The album features all 43 participating entries, including the semi-finalists that failed to qualify for the grand final.

=== Charts ===
Chart (2018)	Peak position
Australian Albums (ARIA)	14
Austrian Albums (Ö3 Austria)	2
Belgian Albums (Ultratop Flanders)	3
Belgian Albums (Ultratop Wallonia)	6
Croatian International Albums (HDU)	16
Czech Albums (ČNS IFPI)	74
Danish Albums (Hitlisten)	2
Dutch Compilation Albums (Compilation Top 30)	2
Finnish Albums (Suomen virallinen lista)	22
German Compilation Albums (Offizielle Top 100)	2
Greek Albums (IFPI)	9
Icelandic Albums (Tónlistinn)	6
Irish Compilation Albums (IRMA)	3
Swedish Albums (Sverigetopplistan)	4
Swiss Albums (Schweizer Hitparade)	2
UK Compilation Albums (Official Charts)	4

== See also ==
- Eurovision Young Musicians 2018
- Junior Eurovision Song Contest 2018
