= Solen lever kvar hos dig =

Single by Kamferdrops
- Released: 26 February 2018
- Recorded: 2017
- Length: 2:49
- Label: Universal Music Norway
- Songwriters: Herbert Trus; Danne Attlerud; Martin Klaman; Kristoffer Tømmerbakke; Erik Smaaland; Kamferdrops

Kamferdrops singles chronology
"Tusen bitar" (2017)	"Solen lever kvar hos dig" (2018)

"Solen lever kvar hos dig" (transl. The sun is still alive with you) is a song recorded by Norwegian singer Kamferdrops. The song was released as a digital download on 26 February 2018 and peaked at number 60 on the Swedish Singles Chart. It took part in Melodifestivalen 2018, and placed sixth in the first semi-final on 3 February 2018. It was written by Kamferdrops along with Herbert Trus, Danne Attlerud, Martin Klaman, Kristoffer Tømmerbakke, and Erik Smaaland.

== Track listing ==
Digital download
No.	Title	Length
1.	"Solen lever kvar hos dig"	2:49

== Charts ==
Chart (2018)	Peak position
Sweden (Sverigetopplistan)	60

== Release history ==
Region	Date	Format	Label
Various	26 February 2018	Digital download	Universal Music Norway
