= Higher Ground (Rasmussen song) =

2018 song by Rasmussen

Single by Rasmussen
- Released: 11 February 2018
- Length: 3:03
- Label: Renegade
- Songwriters: Niclas Arn; Karl Eurén
- Producers: Niclas Arn; Karl Eurén

Rasmussen singles chronology
"Higher Ground" (2018)	"Go Beyond" (2019)

Music video
- "Higher Ground" on YouTube

Eurovision Song Contest 2018 entry
- Country: Denmark
- Artist: Rasmussen
- Languages: English, Icelandic
- Composers: Niclas Arn; Karl Eurén
- Lyricists: Niclas Arn; Karl Eurén

Finals performance
- Semi-final result: 5th
- Semi-final points: 204
- Final result: 9th
- Final points: 226

Entry chronology
- ◄ "Where I Am" (2017)
- "Love Is Forever" (2019) ►

"Higher Ground" is a song performed by Danish singer Jonas Rasmussen. The song was released as a digital download in Denmark on 11 February 2018, through Renegade Records. It represented Denmark in the Eurovision Song Contest 2018 in Lisbon, Portugal.

== Eurovision Song Contest ==
On 22 January 2018, Rasmussen was confirmed as one of the 10 participants in Dansk Melodi Grand Prix 2018 with the song "Higher Ground". The 10 songs competed in the final, where the winner was determined over two rounds of voting. In the first round, the top 3 songs based on the combination of votes from a public vote and a five-member jury panel qualified to the super-final. In the super-final, the winner was determined as well by the combination of votes from the public and the jury panel. Rasmussen won the super-final with 50% of the vote.

The song competed in the second semi-final, held on 10 May 2018 in Lisbon, Portugal, and subsequently qualified for the final, held on 12 May 2018. In the final, the song received 38 points from jury vote and 188 points from televote for a combined score of 226 points and an overall 9th place.

== Theme ==
In an interview, Rasmussen explains that the song is about trying to solve conflicts by peaceful means and refraining from the use of violence.

Quote: "That's why the song is also about being able to take a step back and solve conflicts in a different way than just thrusting a sword into the belly of someone, you are facing. So, it has a message of peace."

In the same interview, Rasmussen explained that the song is inspired by the legend of Magnus Erlendsson, a late Viking age chieftain.

== Track listing ==
Digital download
No.	Title	Length
1.	"Higher Ground"	3:03
2.	"Higher Ground" (karaoke version)	3:03
3.	"Higher Ground" (instrumental version)	3:03

== Charts ==
Chart (2018)	Peak position
Austria (Ö3 Austria Top 40)	49
Belgium (Ultratip Bubbling Under Flanders)	43
Denmark (Tracklisten)	9
Germany (GfK)	88
Hungary (Single Top 40)	9
Scottish Singles Sales (Official Charts)	38
Sweden (Sverigetopplistan)	29
Switzerland (Schweizer Hitparade)	43
UK Singles Downloads (Official Charts)	34
UK Indie (Official Charts)	45

== Release history ==
Region	Date	Format	Label
Denmark	11 February 2018	Digital download	Renegade
