= Museu da Marioneta =

Museum in Lisbon, Portugal

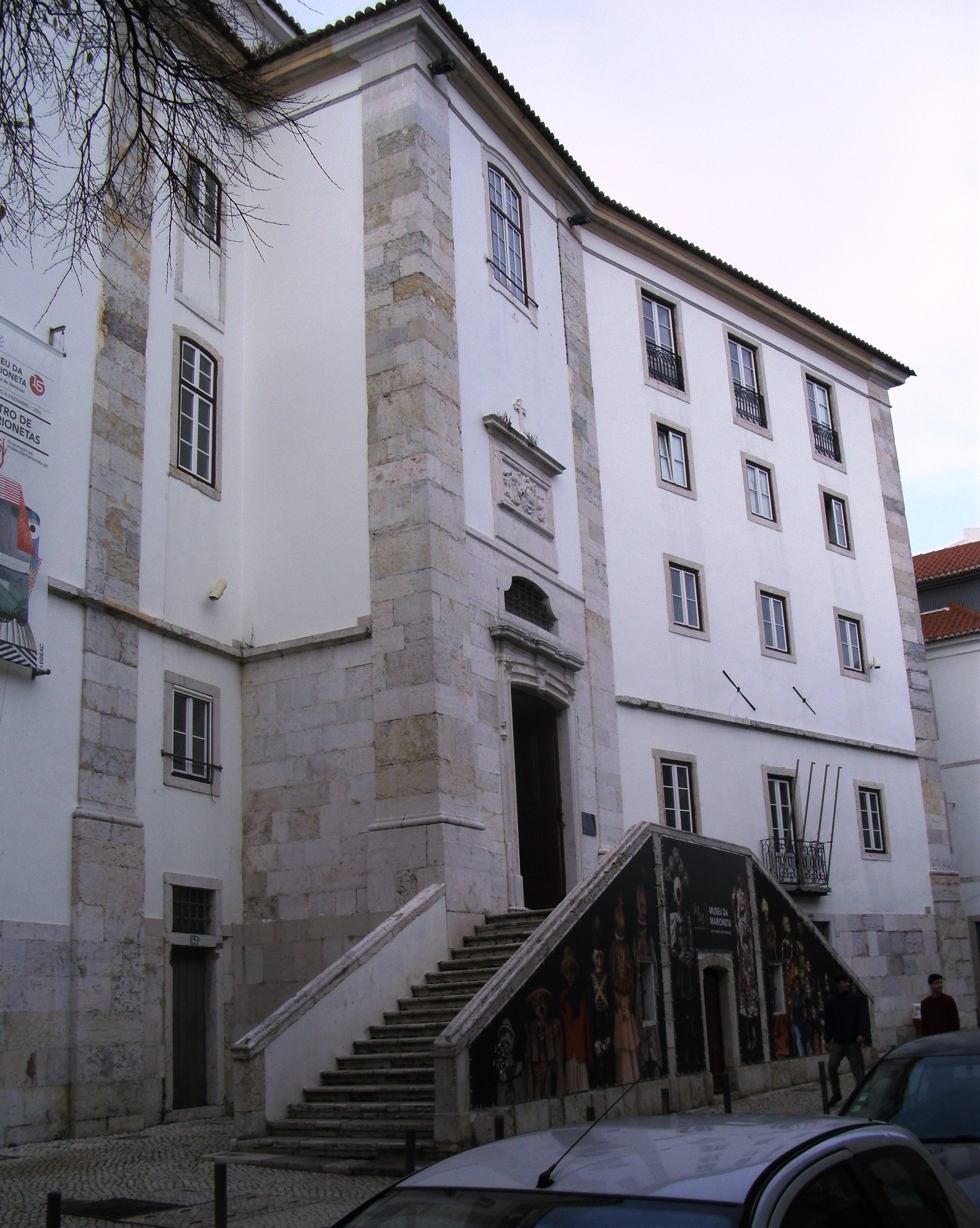
- Location: Estrela, Portugal
- Website: Official website

The Museu da Marioneta (Museum of Puppetry) has been located since November 2001 in the Convent of Bernardas in Lisbon, Portugal, establishing itself as the first museum in Portugal entirely dedicated to the interpretation and dissemination of the history of puppetry, covering the history of this art form across the world, presenting the different types of puppets and the different approaches they allow, with special emphasis on Portuguese puppets.

With the assistance of various authors, collectors and puppeteers, the museum's collection has been gradually extended and diversified. Initially, the museum focused on Portuguese puppetry, and it holds a large collection of traditional Portuguese puppets. Since late 2008, the museum has also housed, on deposit, the collector Francisco Capelo's collection of puppets and masks from Southeast Asia and Africa.

== Convent of Bernardas ==
The Museum is housed in the Convent of Bernardas, classified as a Public Interest. The convent was founded in 1653, by permission of King John IV of Portugal, as being a cloistered closed in 1655.

On the occasion of the 1755 Lisbon earthquake, the building was almost completely destroyed. Its reconstruction began in 1758 under the architect Giacomo Azzolini.

In 1786 the convent returned to religious use, and it remained as such until 1834, when the religious orders were dissolved and their property expropriated.

The former convent was successively leased, being acquired in 1850 by Joaquim Lopes Chamber who installed a College.

A succession of occupations, from Polytechnic High School, movie theater, shows, philharmonic concerts, and housing its most recent role.

In 1998, with the property in deep degradation, it was acquired by the Lisbon City Council, making the recovery and rehabilitation from November 1999 until July 2001.

Currently the former convent houses 34 families, a community center, a restaurant and the Museu da Marioneta.

== History ==
The museum was created in 1987 by the São Lourenço Puppet Company that was dedicated to the realization of traveling shows across the country and the foreigner.

It was created thus the first Portuguese space dedicated to puppetry, from the extinction of the Bairro Alto Theatre in 1755, continuing a Portuguese tradition of theater and opera.

The existence of a Portuguese tradition of theater and puppet opera, very important in the history of European theater, represented by the historical repertoire of operas for puppet António José da Silva, the Jew, and the popular repertoire of numerous street companies of puppeteers that over the centuries traveled the country.

The Society of St. Lawrence, founded by José Alberto Gil, musician, and Helena Vaz, puppeteer and artist, raised as a result of its activity, several copies of puppets that formed the initial core of the museum.

The property degradation it was in the private management of the Museum and the lack of support or institutional subsidies made it difficult economic viability and the maintenance of a project that, over 13 years, Lisbon represented on the international circuit of marionette.

The importance of the collection and the fact that it is the only museum of its kind in Portugal led to the signing of an agreement between the owner of the original collection and the Lisbon City Council, through the EGEAC municipal company, which allowed the maintenance of this museum and its transfer in 2001 to a space that allows its public enjoyment in conditions of dignity it deserves.

In 2007/2008, the Museum of Puppetry has undergone rehabilitation and expansion works under an application to the operational POC-Cultural Program, which allowed the creation of appropriate conditions for exhibitions and shows, the expansion of the permanent exhibition circuit, the store installation in a new space, larger and more suitable for the reception of visitors.
