= Kamferdrops =

Norwegian singer and songwriter

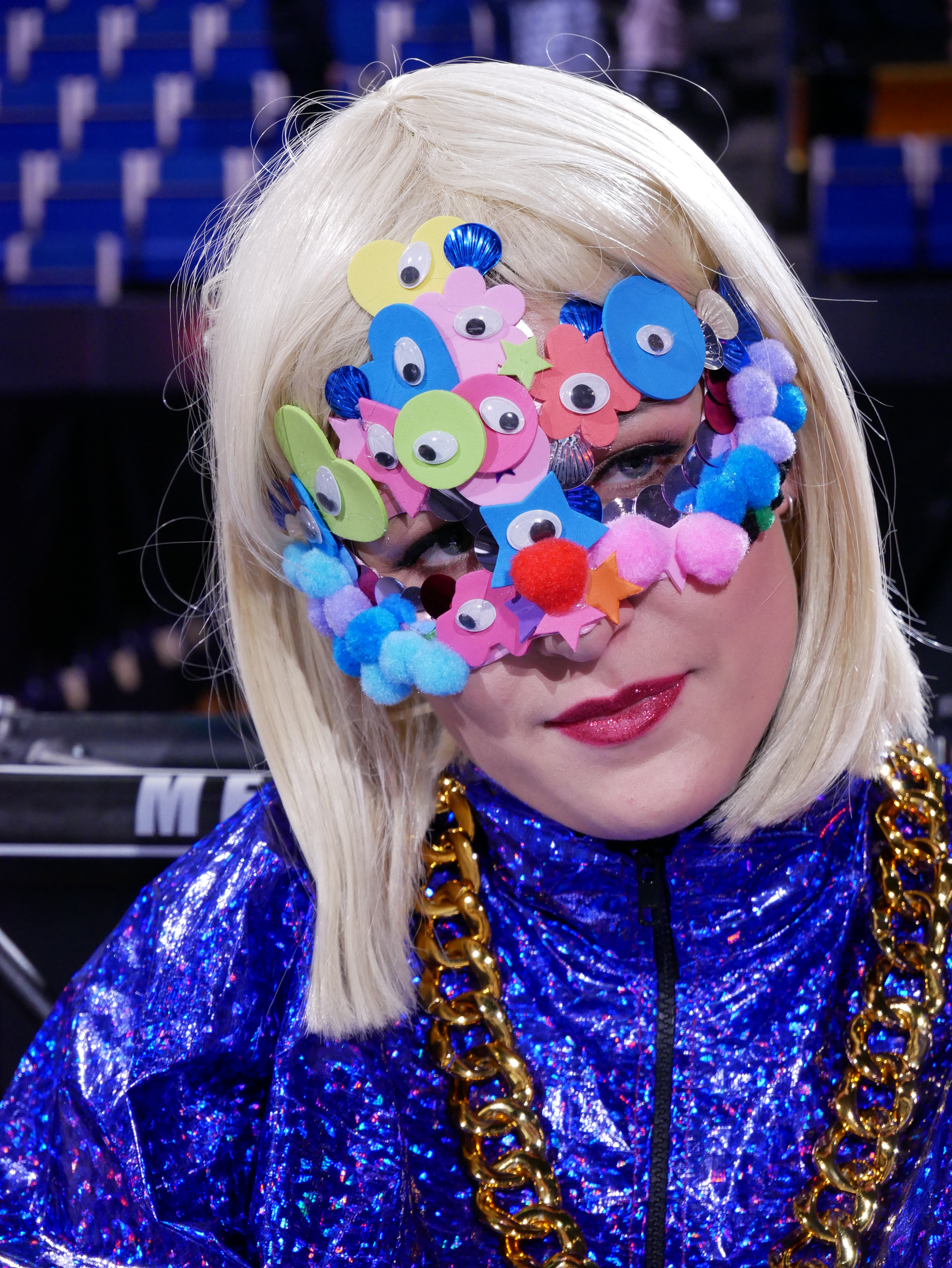
- Kamferdrops at Melodifestivalen 2018

Background information
- Born: Heidi Musum; 22 June 1993 (age 33); Oslo, Norway
- Genres: Dream pop
- Occupations: Singer; songwriter
- Instrument: Vocals
- Years active: 2017–present
- Label: TEN

Heidi Musum (born 22 June 1993), better known by her stage name Kamferdrops, is a Norwegian singer and songwriter. She first achieved recognition in Sweden and Norway in 2017, after her cover of Ole Ivars and Kikki Danielsson's 1999 song "Jag trodde änglarna fanns" became a number-two hit in Sweden and top forty hit in Norway.

She is known for always wearing a mask while making public appearances, and her songs are sung in both Swedish and Norwegian. Kamferdrops competed in Melodifestivalen 2018 with the song "Solen lever kvar hos dig". She was eliminated after she placed sixth in the first semi-final.

== Discography ==
=== Charted singles ===
Title	Year	Peak chart positions		Certifications	Album
Title	Year	NOR	SWE	Certifications	Album
"Jag trodde änglarna fanns"	2017	33	2	GLF: 5× Platinum	Non-album singles
"Tusen bitar"	2017	—	25		Non-album singles
"Solen lever kvar hos dig"	2018	—	60		Non-album singles
