= Rasmussen (singer) =

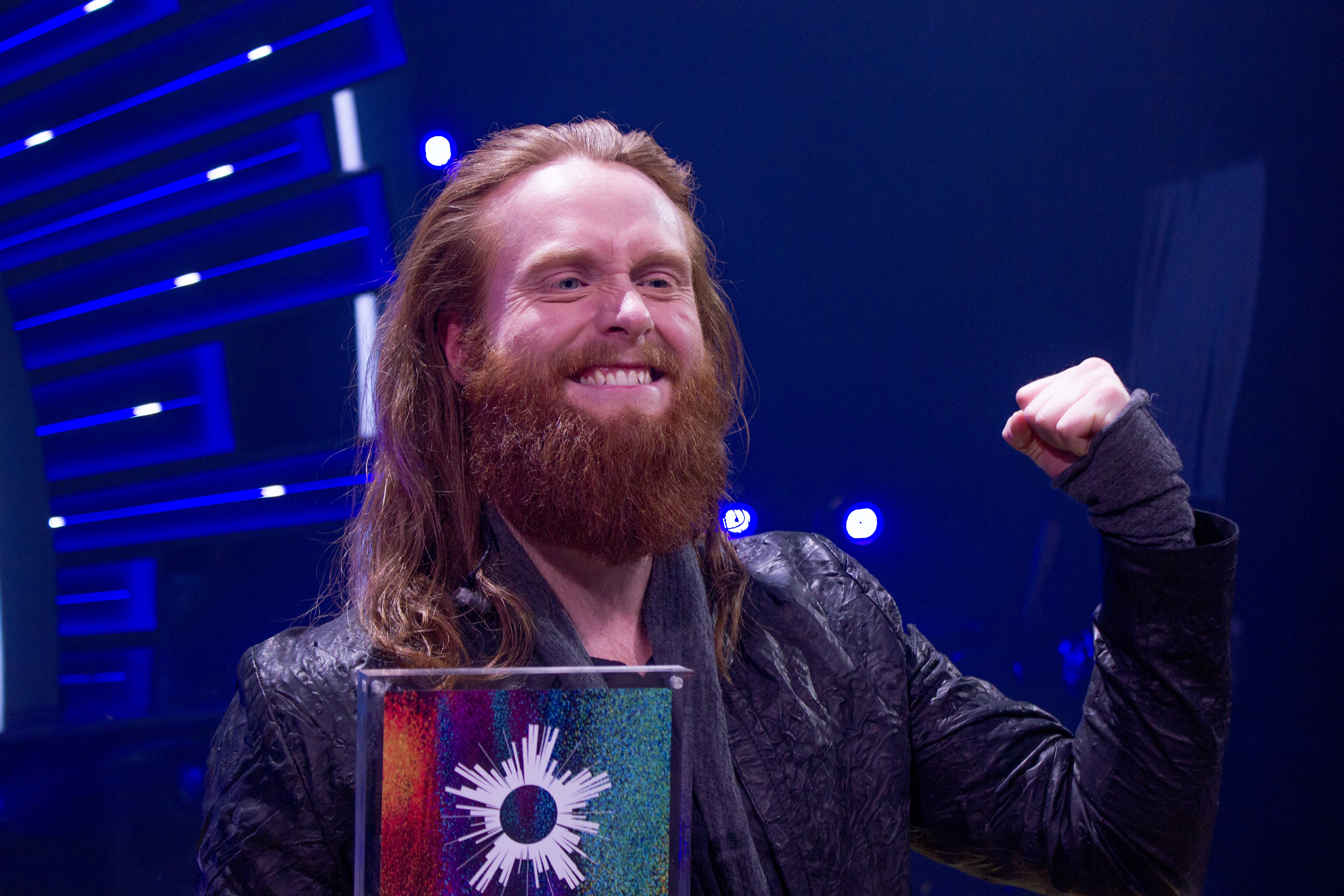
- Rasmussen after winning Dansk Melodi Grand Prix 2018

Background information
- Born: Jonas Flodager Rasmussen; 23 January 1985 (age 41); Viborg, Denmark
- Genres: Pop; rock
- Occupations: Singer; actor
- Instrument: Vocals
- Label: Renegade Records

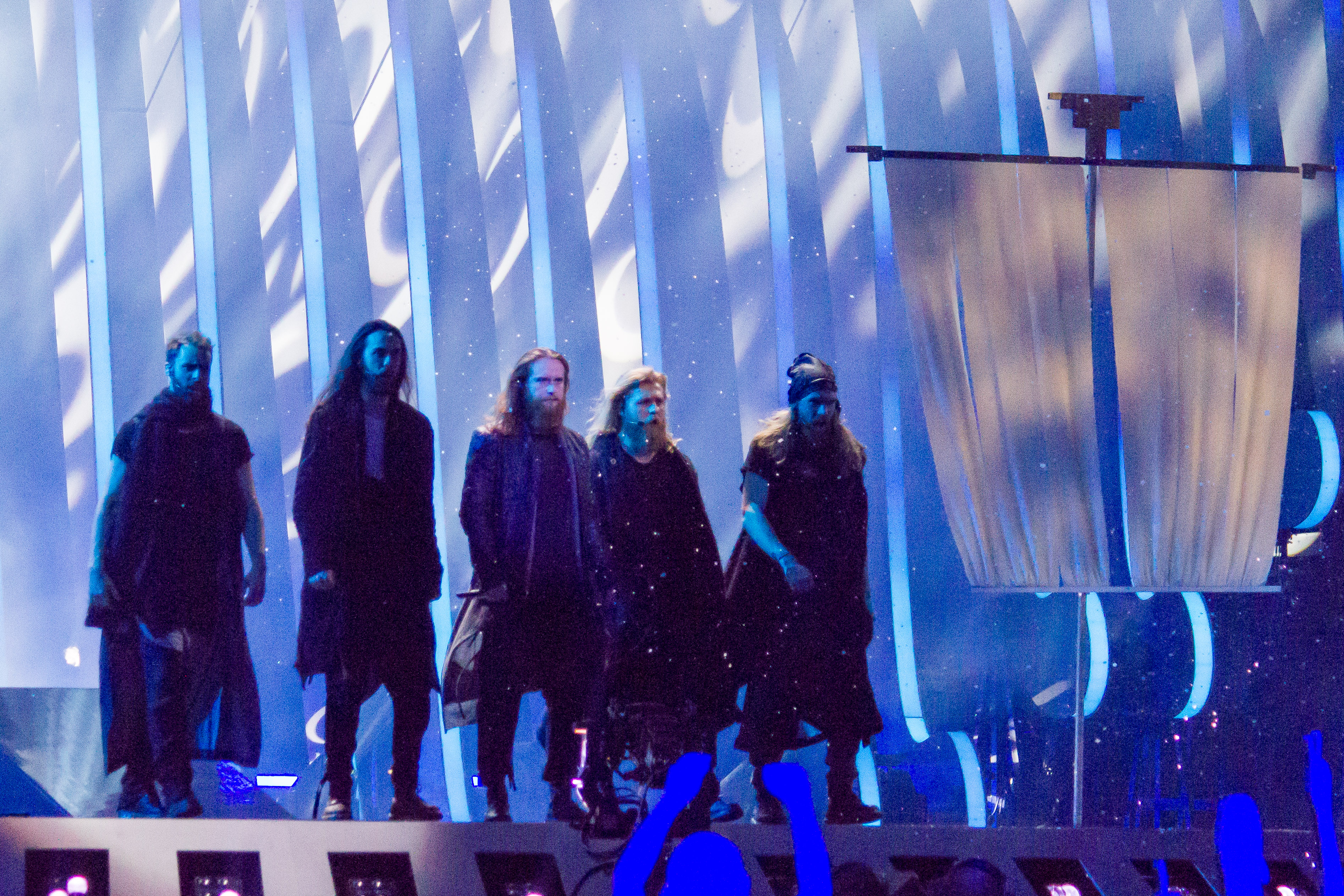
Rasmussen performing at the Eurovision Song Contest 2018

Jonas Flodager Rasmussen (born 23 January 1985), known professionally as simply Rasmussen, is a Danish singer and actor. He represented Denmark in the Eurovision Song Contest 2018 in Lisbon, Portugal, with the song "Higher Ground".

== Early and personal life ==
Rasmussen was born in Viborg. He lives in Langå with his wife and two children. He studied dramaturgy and music at Aarhus University, and works as a teacher at both the School of Performing Arts at Viborg Cultural School and Aarhus Theatre Learning.

== Career ==
Rasmussen is the lead singer and frontman of the 1980s cover band Hair Metal Heröes, which performs covers of songs by artists such as Van Halen, Europe, Bon Jovi, Def Leppard, and Scorpions among others. He has also worked as a stage actor, performing in stage productions of musicals such as West Side Story, Rent and Les Misérables in Aarhus and Holstebro. In January 2018, he was confirmed to be taking part in Dansk Melodi Grand Prix 2018 with the song "Higher Ground". The song was later released on 5 February. Rasmussen won the competition on 10 February 2018, and went on to represent Denmark in the Eurovision Song Contest 2018 in Lisbon, Portugal on 12 May 2018, where he placed 9th overall with a score of 226 points.

== Discography ==
=== Singles ===
Single	Year	Peak chart positions									Album
Single	Year	DEN	AUT	BEL (FL) Tip	FRA	GER	SCO	SWE	SWI	UK Down.	Album
"Higher Ground"	2018	9	49	43	65	88	38	29	43	34	Non-album singles
"Go Beyond"	2019	—	—	—	—	—	—	—	—	—	Non-album singles
"Stand By Each Other"	2021	—	—	—	—	—	—	—	—	—	
	"—" denotes a single that did not chart or was not released.										

Awards and achievements
Preceded by Anja Nissen with "Where I Am"	Denmark in the Eurovision Song Contest; 2018	Succeeded by Leonora with "Love Is Forever"
