= France in the Eurovision Song Contest 2020 =

- Eurovision Song Contest 2020
- Participating broadcaster: France Télévisions
- Country: France
- Selection process: Internal selection
- Announcement date: Artist: 14 January 2020; Song: 16 February 2020

Competing entry
- Song: "Mon alliée (The Best in Me)"
- Artist: Tom Leeb
- Songwriters: Thomas G:son; Peter Boström; John Lundvik; Amir Haddad; Léa Ivanne; Tom Leeb

Placement
- Final result: Contest cancelled

Participation chronology

France was set to be represented at the Eurovision Song Contest 2020 with the song "Mon alliée (The Best in Me)" written by Tom Leeb, Léa Ivanne, Amir Haddad, John Lundvik, Peter Boström and Thomas G:son, and performed by Tom Leeb. The French broadcaster France Télévisions in collaboration with the television channel France 2 internally selected the French entry for the 2020 contest in Rotterdam, Netherlands. Tom Leeb was officially announced by France 2 as the French entrant on 14 January 2020 and later the song was presented to the public as the contest entry during a live performance by Leeb on 16 February 2020 during the France 2 programme 20H30 Le Dimanche.

As a member of the "Big Five", France automatically qualified to compete in the final of the Eurovision Song Contest. However, the contest was cancelled due to the COVID-19 pandemic.

== Background ==
Prior to the 2020 contest, France had participated in the Eurovision Song Contest sixty-two times since its debut as one of seven countries to take part in 1956. France first won the contest in 1958 with "Dors, mon amour" performed by André Claveau. In the 1960s, they won three times, with "Tom Pillibi" performed by Jacqueline Boyer in 1960, "Un premier amour" performed by Isabelle Aubret in 1962 and "Un jour, un enfant" performed by Frida Boccara, who won in 1969 in a four-way tie with the Netherlands, Spain and the United Kingdom. France's fifth victory came in 1977, when Marie Myriam won with the song "L'oiseau et l'enfant". France have also finished second four times, with Paule Desjardins in 1957, Catherine Ferry in 1976, Joëlle Ursull in 1990 and Amina in 1991, who lost out to Sweden's Carola in a tie-break. In the 21st century, France has had less success, only making the top ten four times, with Natasha St-Pier finishing fourth in 2001, Sandrine François finishing fifth in 2002, Patricia Kaas finishing eighth in 2009 and Amir finishing sixth in 2016. In 2019, the nation finished in sixteenth place with the song "Roi" performed by Bilal Hassani.

The French national broadcaster, France Télévisions, broadcasts the event within France and delegates the selection of the nation's entry to the television channel France 2. France 2 confirmed that France would participate in the 2020 Eurovision Song Contest on 23 September 2019. The French broadcaster had used both national finals and internal selection to choose the French entry in the past. The 2018 and 2019 French entries were selected via the national final Destination Eurovision, however the broadcaster announced in November 2019 that they would opt to internally select the 2020 French entry.

== Before Eurovision ==
=== Internal selection ===
France 2 announced in late 2019 that the French entry for the 2020 Eurovision Song Contest would be selected internally. On 14 January 2020, France 2 announced Tom Leeb as the French entrant for the Eurovision Song Contest 2020. His song "Mon alliée (The Best in Me)" was presented to the public on 16 February 2020 during a live performance at the Eiffel Tower in Paris, broadcast on France 2 during the programme 20H30 Le Dimanche and hosted by Laurent Delahousse.

"Mon alliée (The Best in Me)", written by Tom Leeb, Léa Ivanne, Amir Haddad, John Lundvik, Peter Boström and Thomas G:son and contains lyrics in a bilingual mix of French and English, was selected by the artistic committee of France Télévisions from over 100 submissions, headed by France 2 entertainment director and newly appointed French Head of Delegation for the Eurovision Song Contest Alexandra Redde-Amiel, after the French broadcaster requested proposals from Francophone and international songwriters. G:son and Boström had written the Swedish Eurovision Song Contest 2012 winning song "Euphoria", while Haddad represented France in the 2016 Contest and Lundvik represented Sweden in the 2019 Contest.

== At Eurovision ==
According to Eurovision rules, all nations with the exceptions of the host country and the "Big Five" (France, Germany, Italy, Spain and the United Kingdom) are required to qualify from one of two semi-finals in order to compete for the final; the top ten countries from each semi-final progress to the final. As a member of the "Big 5", France automatically qualified to compete in the final on 16 May 2020. In addition to their participation in the final, France was also required to broadcast and vote in one of the two semi-finals. During the semi-final allocation draw on 28 January 2020, France was assigned to broadcast and vote in the second semi-final on 14 May 2020. However, due to COVID-19 pandemic, the contest was cancelled.
