= France in the Eurovision Song Contest 2019 =

- Eurovision Song Contest 2019
- Participating broadcaster: France Télévisions
- Country: France
- Selection process: Destination Eurovision 2019
- Selection date: 26 January 2019

Competing entry
- Song: "Roi"
- Artist: Bilal Hassani
- Songwriters: Bilal Hassani; Émilie Satt; Jean-Karl Lucas; Medeline

Placement
- Final result: 16th, 105 points

Participation chronology

France was represented at the Eurovision Song Contest 2019 with the song "Roi" written by Bilal Hassani, Madame Monsieur and Medeline, and performed by Bilal Hassani. The French broadcaster France Télévisions in collaboration with the television channel France 2 organised the national final Destination Eurovision 2019 in order to select the French entry for the 2019 contest in Tel Aviv, Israel. Eighteen songs competed in the national final which consisted of two semi-finals and a final. Nine entries competed in each semi-final and the top four from each semi-final were selected to advance to the final following the combination of votes from a five-member international jury panel and a public vote. In the final on 26 January 2019, "Roi" performed by Bilal Hassani was selected as the winner following the combination of votes from a ten-member international jury panel and a public vote.

As a member of the "Big Five", France automatically qualified to compete in the final of the Eurovision Song Contest. Performing in position 21, France placed sixteenth out of the 26 participating countries with 105 points.

== Background ==
Prior to the 2019 contest, France had participated in the Eurovision Song Contest sixty-one times since its debut as one of seven countries to take part in 1956. France first won the contest in 1958 with "Dors, mon amour" performed by André Claveau. In the 1960s, they won three times, with "Tom Pillibi" performed by Jacqueline Boyer in 1960, "Un premier amour" performed by Isabelle Aubret in 1962 and "Un jour, un enfant" performed by Frida Boccara, who won in 1969 in a four-way tie with the Netherlands, Spain and the United Kingdom. France's fifth victory came in 1977, when Marie Myriam won with the song "L'oiseau et l'enfant". France have also finished second four times, with Paule Desjardins in 1957, Catherine Ferry in 1976, Joëlle Ursull in 1990 and Amina in 1991, who lost out to Sweden's Carola in a tie-break. In the 21st century, France has had less success, only making the top ten four times, with Natasha St-Pier finishing fourth in 2001, Sandrine François finishing fifth in 2002, Patricia Kaas finishing eighth in 2009 and Amir finishing sixth in 2016. In 2018, the nation finished in thirteenth place with the song "Mercy" performed by Madame Monsieur.

The French national broadcaster, France Télévisions, broadcasts the event within France and delegates the selection of the nation's entry to the television channel France 2. France 2 confirmed that France would participate in the 2019 Eurovision Song Contest on 21 June 2018. The French broadcaster had used both national finals and internal selection to choose the French entry in the past. From 2015 to 2017, the broadcaster opted to internally select the French entry. The 2018 French entry was selected via the national final Destination Eurovision, a procedure that was continued in order to select the 2019 entry.

== Before Eurovision ==
=== Destination Eurovision 2019 ===
Destination Eurovision 2019 was the national final organised by France 2 to select France's entry for the Eurovision Song Contest 2019. The competition consisted of two semi-finals on 12 and 19 January 2019 and a final on 26 January 2019, all taking place at the Studio Visual – Bât 210 in Saint-Denis and hosted by French-Canadian singer Garou. The shows were broadcast on France 2, TV5Monde and TV5 Québec Canada on a time delay.

==== Format ====
The format of the competition consisted of three live shows: two semi-finals on 12 and 19 January 2019 and a final on 26 January 2019. Nine entries competed in each semi-final, from which four were selected to advance to the final from each show. Results during the semi-finals were determined by the combination of public televoting (50%) and a five-member international jury panel (50%), while results in the final were determined by the combination of public televoting (50%) and a ten-member international jury panel (50%). The jury panel in all shows varied in composition, therefore twenty juries were involved in the voting. The public and the juries each had a total of 210 points in the semi-finals and 420 points in the final to award, with each jury member awarding 2, 4, 6, 8, 10 and 12 points to their top six entries. The public vote was based on the percentage of votes each song achieved through telephone and SMS voting. For example, if a song gained 10% of the viewer vote in the final, then that entry would be awarded 10% of 420 points rounded to the nearest integer: 42 points.

Like in 2018, the competition featured a three-member Francophone jury panel, however they no longer have a say in the results of the contest and only provided feedback to the artists during each of the three shows. The Francophone jury panel consisted of:

- Christophe Willem – Singer, commentator of the Eurovision Song Contest semi-finals in 2018
- André Manoukian – Jazz singer and former judge on Nouvelle Star, commentator of the Eurovision Song Contest semi-finals in 2018
- Vitaa – Singer, French female artist with the most radio airplay in 2018, Destination Eurovision 2018 participant as a songwriter

==== Competing entries ====
France 2 opened a submission period on 21 June 2018 in order for interested artists and songwriters to submit their proposals through an online submission form up until the deadline on 30 November 2018. Songs were required to contain at least 70% French language lyrics with a free language allowance for the remaining lyrics. In addition to the open submissions, France 2 also requested proposals from record companies. At the closing of the deadline, the French broadcaster received over 1,500 submissions. A selection committee reviewed the received submissions and selected eighteen entries to compete in the national final. The competing artists and songs were announced on 6 December 2018 during a press conference at the headquarters of France Télévisions.

Artist	Song	Songwriter(s)
Aysat	"Comme une grande"	Aysat, Mohamed Zayana
Battista Acquaviva	"Passiò"	Florent Bidoyen, Théodore Eristoff, Battista Acquaviva
Bilal Hassani	"Roi"	Bilal Hassani, Madame Monsieur, Medeline
Chimène Badi	"Là-haut"	Yseult, Yacine Azeggagh, Corson, Boban Apostolov
The Divaz	"La voix d'Aretha"	Yacine Azeggagh, Marielle Hervé
Doutson	"Sois un bon fils"	Mamadou Niakate, Jean-Pascal Anziani, Ryad Bouchami, Caz B
Emmanuel Moire	"La promesse"	Emmanuel Moire
Florina	"In the Shadow"	Manon Romiti, Silvio Lisonne, Pierre-Laurent Faure, Adrien Levron
Gabriella	"On cherche encore (Never Get Enough)"	Gabriella Laberge, Christian Sbrocca, Richard Turcotte, Zander Howard Scott
Lautner	"J'ai pas le temps"	John Mamann, Johnny Goldstein, Koby Hass, Sophie Tapie
Mazy	"Oulala"	Julie Mazi
Naestro	"Le brasier"	Mark Hekic, Alexandra Maquet, Thierry Leteurtre
Noémie	"Ma petite famille"	Cehashi, Noémie, Youssoupha
PhilipElise	"Madame la paix"	Elise Philip, Guillaume Soulan
Seemone	"Tous les deux"	Fabrice Mantegna, Alexandre Mazarguil, Léa Simoncini
Silvàn Areg	"Allez leur dire"	Caz B, Mamadou Niakate, Erick Ness
Tracy De Sá	"Por aquí"	Tiery-F, Tracy De Sá
Ugo	"Ce qui me blesse"	Ugo Benterfa, Vicken Sayrin

==== Shows ====
===== Semi-finals =====
Two semi-finals took place on 12 and 19 January 2019. In each semi-final eight entries competed and four qualified to the final. In addition to performing their contest entry, each artist performed a cover version of a popular song.

Semi-final 1 – 12 January 2019
R/O	Artist	Song	Cover (Original artist)	Jury	Televote	Total	Place
1	Naestro	"Le brasier"	"Perfect" (Ed Sheeran)	12	8	20	9
2	Florina	"In the Shadow"	"Hymne à l'amour" (Édith Piaf)	0	21	21	8
3	Chimène Badi	"Là-haut"	"Non, je ne regrette rien" (Édith Piaf)	22	44	66	2
4	Battista Acquaviva	"Passiò"	"Parla più piano" (Gianni Morandi)	2	29	31	7
5	Silvàn Areg	"Allez leur dire"	"Un homme debout" (Claudio Capéo)	38	21	59	3
6	Bilal Hassani	"Roi"	"Carmen" (Stromae)	58	57	115	1
7	Aysat	"Comme une grande"	"Dancing Queen" (ABBA)	34	6	40	4
8	Lautner	"J'ai pas le temps"	"J'ai cherché" (Amir)	26	9	35	5
9	Mazy	"Oulala"	"Si seulement je pouvais lui manquer" (Calogero)	18	15	33	6

Detailed International Jury Votes – Semi-final 1
R/O	Song	David Tserunyan	Tali Eshkoli	Carla Bugalho Trindade	Sanja Vučić	Paul Jordan	Total
R/O	Song	ARM	ISR	POR	SRB	GBR	Total
1	"Le brasier"		2	2	2	6	12
2	"In the Shadow"						0
3	"Là-haut"	2	6	6		8	22
4	"Passiò"					2	2
5	"Allez leur dire"	10	12	10	6		38
6	"Roi"	12	10	12	12	12	58
7	"Comme une grande"	8	8	8	10		34
8	"J'ai pas le temps"	4	4		8	10	26
9	"Oulala"	6		4	4	4	18

Semi-final 2 – 19 January 2019
R/O	Artist	Song	Cover (Original artist)	Jury	Televote	Total	Place
1	Gabriella	"On cherche encore (Never Get Enough)"	"L'Encre de tes yeux" (Francis Cabrel)	14	18	32	6
2	The Divaz	"La voix d'Aretha"	"Respect" (Aretha Franklin)	26	28	54	3
3	Ugo	"Ce qui me blesse"	"Résiste" (France Gall)	30	8	38	5
4	Tracy de Sá	"Por aquí"	"Lose Yourself" (Eminem)	2	13	15	8
5	Emmanuel Moire	"La promesse"	"Take On Me" (a-ha)	28	56	84	2
6	Noémie	"Ma petite famille"	"Wonderwall" (Oasis)	8	6	14	9
7	Seemone	"Tous les deux"	"Magnolias for Ever" (Claude François)	60	53	113	1
8	Doutson	"Sois un bon fils"	"Femme libérée" (Cookie Dingler)	24	15	39	4
9	PhilipElise	"Madame la paix"	"J'veux du soleil" (Au P'tit Bonheur)	18	13	31	7

Detailed International Jury Votes – Semi-final 2
R/O	Song	Anushik Ter-Ghukasyan	Zoё Straub	Mikolas Josef	Natia Mshvenieradze	Christer Björkman	Total
R/O	Song	ARM	AUT	CZE	GEO	SWE	Total
1	"On cherche encore (Never Get Enough)"		10	4			14
2	"La voix d'Aretha"	2	8	6	6	4	26
3	"Ce qui me blesse"	8	4		8	10	30
4	"Por aqui"					2	2
5	"La promesse"	10	6		4	8	28
6	"Ma petite famille"			8			8
7	"Tous les deux"	12	12	12	12	12	60
8	"Sois un bon fils"	6		10	2	6	24
9	"Madame la paix"	4	2	2	10		18

===== Final =====
The final took place on 26 January 2019. The four entries that qualified from the preceding two semi-finals competed and "Roi" performed by Bilal Hassani was selected as the winner. In addition to performing their contest entry, each artist performed a cover version of a former Eurovision entry and together performed the Austrian Eurovision Song Contest 2014 winning song "Rise Like a Phoenix" by Conchita Wurst. Garou performed with André Manoukian as the interval act of the show.

Final – 26 January 2019
R/O	Artist	Song	Cover (Original artist)	Jury	Televote	Total	Place
1	Chimène Badi	"Là-haut"	"Ne partez pas sans moi" (Céline Dion)	56	63	119	3
2	Silvàn Areg	"Allez leur dire"	"C'est le dernier qui a parlé qui a raison" (Amina)	76	26	102	5
3	The Divaz	"La voix d'Aretha"	"Waterloo" (ABBA)	44	48	92	6
4	Emmanuel Moire	"La promesse"	"Euphoria" (Loreen)	64	51	115	4
5	Doutson	"Sois un bon fils"	"J'ai cherché" (Amir)	10	8	18	8
6	Seemone	"Tous les deux"	"L'oiseau et l'enfant" (Marie Myriam)	94	62	156	2
7	Bilal Hassani	"Roi"	"Fuego" (Eleni Foureira)	50	150	200	1
8	Aysat	"Comme une grande"	"Fairytale" (Alexander Rybak)	26	12	38	7

Detailed International Jury Votes – Final
R/O	Song	Rona Nishliu	Olga Salamakha	Alexandros Panayi	Cristoph Pellander	Michael Kealy	Doron Medalie	Nicola Caligiore	Ekaterina Orlova	Beatriz Luengo	Reto Peritz	Total
R/O	Song	ALB	BLR	CYP	GER	IRE	ISR	ITA	RUS	ESP	SWI	Total
1	"Là-haut"	6	10	4	10	2		4	12	2	6	56
2	"Allez leur dire"	4	2	8	8	12	10	2	6	12	12	76
3	"La voix d'Aretha"		6	2	2		12	6	10	4	2	44
4	"La promesse"	8	8	10	4	8		10	8	8		64
5	"Sois un bon fils"	2				4	4					10
6	"Tous les deux"	12	12	12	12	10	8	12		6	10	94
7	"Roi"	10	4	6	6	6	2		2	10	4	50
8	"Comme une grande"						6	8	4		8	26

==== Ratings ====
Show	Date	Viewing figures		Night Rank	Ref.
Show	Date	Nominal	Share	Night Rank	Ref.
Semi-final 1	12 January 2019	2,136,000	11.8%	#3	
Semi-final 2	19 January 2019	1,487,000	7.8%	#4	
Final	26 January 2019	2,140,000	11.7%	#3	

=== Promotion ===
Bilal Hassani made several appearances across Europe to specifically promote "Roi" as the French Eurovision entry. On 23 February, Bilal Hassani performed "Roi" during the final of the Ukrainian Eurovision national final. On 8 March, Hassani performed during the Melfest WKND Pre-Party event which was held at the Estelle venue in Stockholm, Sweden. On 6 April, Hassani performed during the Eurovision in Concert event which was held at the AFAS Live venue in Amsterdam, Netherlands and hosted by Cornald Maas and Hera Björk. On 13 April, Hassani performed during the London Eurovision Party, which was held at the Café de Paris venue in London, United Kingdom and hosted by Nicki French and Paddy O'Connell.

== At Eurovision ==
According to Eurovision rules, all nations with the exceptions of the host country and the "Big Five" (France, Germany, Italy, Spain and the United Kingdom) are required to qualify from one of two semi-finals in order to compete for the final; the top ten countries from each semi-final progress to the final. As a member of the "Big Five", France automatically qualified to compete in the final on 18 May 2019. In addition to their participation in the final, France is also required to broadcast and vote in one of the two semi-finals. During the semi-final allocation draw on 28 January 2019, France was assigned to broadcast and vote in the first semi-final on 14 May 2019.

In France, the two semi-finals was broadcast on France 4 with commentary by André Manoukian and Sandy Herebert, while the final was broadcast on France 2 with commentary by Stéphane Bern and André Manoukian. The French spokesperson, who announced the top 12-point score awarded by the French jury during the final, was Julia Molkhou.

=== Final ===
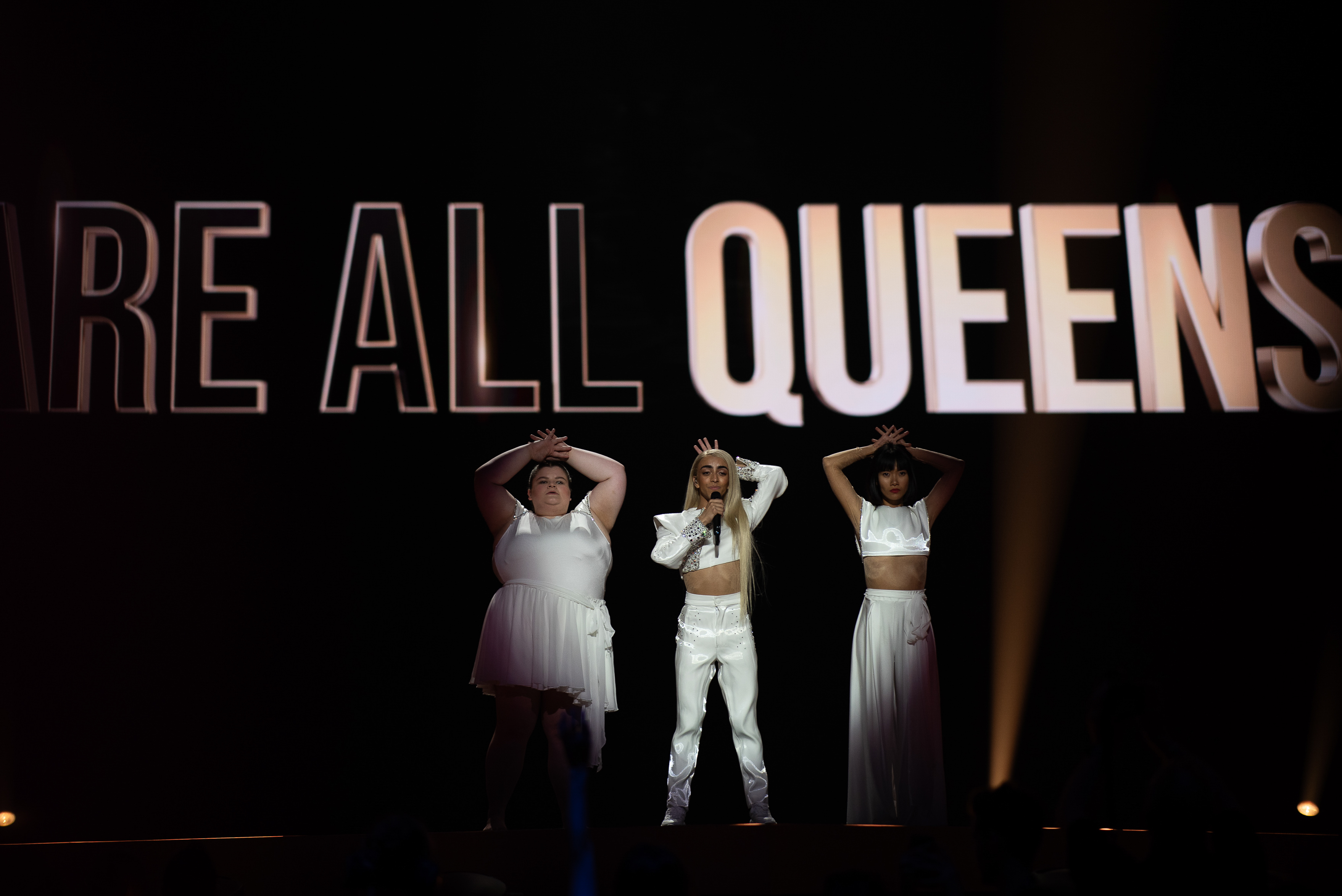
Bilal Hassani during a rehearsal before the final

Bilal Hassani took part in technical rehearsals on 10 and 12 May, followed by dress rehearsals on 13, 17 and 18 May. This included the semi-final jury show on 13 May where an extended clip of the French performance was filmed for broadcast during the live show on 14 May and the jury final on 17 May where the professional juries of each country watched and voted on the competing entries. After technical rehearsals were held on 12 May, the "Big 5" countries and host nation Israel held a press conference. As part of this press conference, the artists took part in a draw to determine which half of the grand final they would subsequently participate in. France was drawn to compete in the second half. Following the conclusion of the second semi-final, the shows' producers decided upon the running order of the final. The running order for the semi-finals and final was decided by the shows' producers rather than through another draw, so that similar songs were not placed next to each other. France was subsequently placed to perform in position 21, following the entry from Azerbaijan and before the entry from Italy.

The French performance featured Bilal Hassani performing on stage dressed in a white long-sleeved crop top with shoulder pads and silver details together with two female backing dancers: Lizzy Howell and deaf dancer Lin Ching-lan. The stage colours were predominately dark and the LED screens displayed quotes as well as news headlines showing the backstories of Howell and Lin who both represent different communities that are often attacked. The performance began with projections of tears and phrases on Hassani's face, while the performance was concluded with the LED screens displaying the quote "We are all kings/queens". Bilal Hassani was joined by three off-stage backing vocalists: Brice Pihan, Émilie Satt who represented France in the 2018 contest as part of the duo Madame Monsieur, and Ulrich Kwasi. France placed sixteenth in the final, scoring 105 points: 38 points from the televoting and 67 points from the juries.

=== Voting ===
Voting during the three shows involved each country awarding two sets of points from 1–8, 10 and 12: one from their professional jury and the other from televoting. Each nation's jury consisted of five music industry professionals who are citizens of the country they represent, with their names published before the contest to ensure transparency. This jury judged each entry based on: vocal capacity; the stage performance; the song's composition and originality; and the overall impression by the act. In addition, no member of a national jury was permitted to be related in any way to any of the competing acts in such a way that they cannot vote impartially and independently. The individual rankings of each jury member, as well as the nation's televoting results, were released shortly after the grand final.

==== Points awarded to France ====
Points awarded to France (Final)
Score	Televote	Jury
12 points		
10 points	Belgium	Australia
8 points		Belgium
7 points		
6 points		Poland
5 points		Austria; Georgia
4 points	Armenia; Israel; Spain	Cyprus; Germany
3 points	Australia; Cyprus; Switzerland	Albania; Croatia; Estonia; Italy; Slovenia
2 points	Italy; Portugal	Czech Republic; Israel; Switzerland; United Kingdom
1 point	Greece; Hungary; Romania	Iceland; Serbia

==== Points awarded by France ====
Points awarded by France (Semi-final 1)
Score	Televote	Jury
12 points	Portugal	Iceland
10 points	Iceland	Hungary
8 points	Poland	Czech Republic
7 points	Australia	Australia
6 points	Serbia	Cyprus
5 points	Belgium	Greece
4 points	Georgia	Belarus
3 points	Greece	Serbia
2 points	Slovenia	Georgia
1 point	Estonia	Estonia

Points awarded by France (Final)
Score	Televote	Jury
12 points	Israel	Netherlands
10 points	Italy	Sweden
8 points	Norway	Italy
7 points	Spain	North Macedonia
6 points	Australia	Azerbaijan
5 points	Netherlands	Iceland
4 points	Denmark	Australia
3 points	Russia	Czech Republic
2 points	Switzerland	Switzerland
1 point	Iceland	Denmark

==== Detailed voting results ====
The following members comprised the French jury:

- Bruno Berberes (jury chairperson) – artistic director, head of casting
- Bintily Diallo – music journalist
- Lionel Maurel – head of video content
- Mohamed Zayana – label manager, producer
- Delphine Elbé – singer, songwriter

Detailed voting results from France (Semi-final 1)
R/O	Country	Jury							Televote	
R/O	Country	B. Berberes	B. Diallo	L. Maurel	M. Zayana	D. Elbé	Rank	Points	Rank	Points
01	Cyprus	6	10	4	2	6	5	6	11	
02	Montenegro	17	13	16	15	13	17		17	
03	Finland	15	15	12	6	10	14		16	
04	Poland	3	9	9	14	12	11		3	8
05	Slovenia	16	4	15	10	15	13		9	2
06	Czech Republic	10	3	5	3	4	3	8	12	
07	Hungary	9	1	14	7	1	2	10	13	
08	Belarus	5	8	2	8	11	7	4	15	
09	Serbia	12	6	6	11	2	8	3	5	6
10	Belgium	13	16	8	12	14	15		6	5
11	Georgia	4	7	10	9	7	9	2	7	4
12	Australia	14	14	3	1	3	4	7	4	7
13	Iceland	1	2	1	17	16	1	12	2	10
14	Estonia	8	12	7	5	8	10	1	10	1
15	Portugal	7	5	13	16	9	12		1	12
16	Greece	2	11	11	4	5	6	5	8	3
17	San Marino	11	17	17	13	17	16		14	

Detailed voting results from France (Final)
R/O	Country	Jury							Televote	
R/O	Country	B. Berberes	B. Diallo	L. Maurel	M. Zayana	D. Elbé	Rank	Points	Rank	Points
01	Malta	17	14	8	22	9	15		19	
02	Albania	6	12	20	14	16	13		13	
03	Czech Republic	13	3	6	21	11	8	3	20	
04	Germany	16	23	11	7	22	17		23	
05	Russia	15	21	14	13	13	19		8	3
06	Denmark	8	13	9	8	7	10	1	7	4
07	San Marino	22	25	25	25	25	25		25	
08	North Macedonia	3	15	2	15	2	4	7	18	
09	Sweden	5	7	3	4	3	2	10	15	
10	Slovenia	25	10	16	24	23	22		16	
11	Cyprus	9	9	4	17	17	11		17	
12	Netherlands	2	6	5	2	1	1	12	6	5
13	Greece	14	22	15	23	15	23		22	
14	Israel	21	11	18	11	6	12		1	12
15	Norway	23	20	24	18	14	24		3	8
16	United Kingdom	20	18	23	6	20	18		24	
17	Iceland	10	1	1	20	24	6	5	10	1
18	Estonia	12	17	19	12	18	20		14	
19	Belarus	24	8	7	19	21	14		21	
20	Azerbaijan	4	4	13	5	4	5	6	12	
21	France									
22	Italy	1	2	21	3	12	3	8	2	10
23	Serbia	19	16	17	10	8	16		11	
24	Switzerland	7	5	12	9	10	9	2	9	2
25	Australia	18	24	10	1	5	7	4	5	6
26	Spain	11	19	22	16	19	21		4	7
