= Bilal Hassani =

French singer (born 1999)

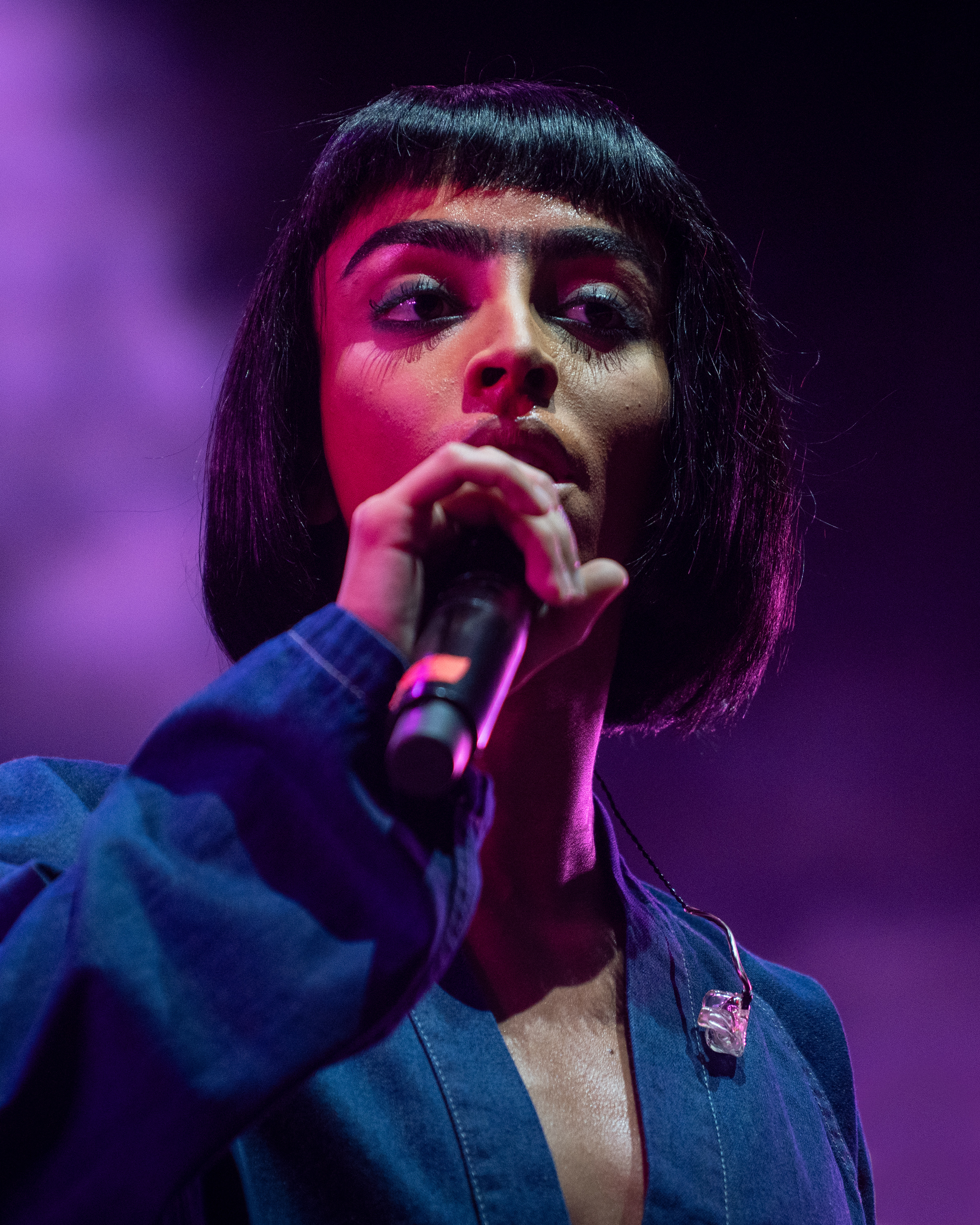
- Hassani in 2023

Background information
- Born: 9 September 1999 (age 27); Orsay, Île-de-France, France
- Genre: Pop
- Occupations: Singer; songwriter; vlogger
- Labels: House of Hassani; Low Wood

Bilal Hassani (French: [bilal asani]; Arabic: بلال حسني, romanized: Bilāl Ḥasanī, pronounced [biˈlaːl ˈħasaniː]; born 9 September 1999) is a French singer-songwriter and YouTuber. He (Note: Hassani uses both "he/him" and "she/her" pronouns. This article uses "he/him" pronouns for consistency.) represented France in the Eurovision Song Contest 2019 with the song "Roi", finishing in 16th place.

== Early life ==
Hassani was born in Orsay, Paris Region, to a Moroccan family from Casablanca. His mother is a French citizen, while his father lives in Singapore. He has an older brother, Taha, who was born in 1995. He obtained his literary baccalaureate in 2017.

== Musical career ==
In 2005, at the age of five, Hassani began singing lessons.

In 2015, encouraged by his friend Nemo Schiffman, a finalist of the first season, Hassani participated in the second season of The Voice Kids and introduced himself in the blind auditions by singing a cover of "Rise Like a Phoenix" by Conchita Wurst, a singer whom he admires. He joined the team of judge Patrick Fiori. He was eliminated during the battle rounds by Swany Patrac.

In 2018, the LGBT magazine Têtu designated Hassani as one of the "30 LGBT+ [people] who move France". The magazine described him as "an icon for French LGBT+ youth".

=== Eurovision Song Contest ===
On 6 December 2018, Hassani was announced to be among the 18 candidates participating in Destination Eurovision, the French national selection process for the Eurovision Song Contest which was broadcast on France 2, with this edition choosing the representative of France at the Eurovision Song Contest 2019, which took place in Tel Aviv, Israel, in May 2019.

On 20 December 2018, an excerpt from his song for the competition was released, the song titled "Roi" and written with the duo and 2018 winner of Destination Eurovision Madame Monsieur. The song was described to be about self-acceptance. On 4 January 2019, "Roi" was made available on all music platforms, and by 14 January, it had exceeded 3 million views. The newspaper Le Monde wrote that Hassani "leaves no one indifferent".

The initial front runner to represent France at Eurovision, Hassani began a media tour for Destination Eurovision on media outlets such as NRJ, Quotidien, and France Inter. On 12 January 2019, he won the semi-final by winning 58 out of 60 points awarded by the international jury, and winning 57 points (the highest score) from the French public. He totaled 115 points and qualified for the final, alongside Chimène Badi (66 points), Silvàn Areg (59 points) and Aysat (40 points). He won the final on 26 January 2019, with a total of 200 points including 150 of the French public while he was ranked fifth with the International Jury vote, with 50 points.

At the Eurovision Song Contest 2019 final, in Israel, Hassani performed the song "Roi", and placed 16th, with 105 points.

He made a cameo appearance in the 2020 film Eurovision Song Contest: The Story of Fire Saga.

In 2024, he had an acting role in Alexis Langlois's feature film Queens of Drama (Les Reines de la drame).

== Danse avec les stars ==
In 2021, Hassani participated in season 11 of Danse avec les stars, the French version of Dancing with the Stars, with dancer Jordan Mouillerac. They were the first same-sex couple in the show. On 26 November 2021, they reached the final, finishing runners-up losing against Tayc and his partner Fauve Hautot with 44% of the votes. In 2022, he joined the jury of the twelfth season.

== Personal life ==
On 23 June 2017, Hassani publicly came out as part of the LGBTQ+ community, the day before he attended the Paris Pride. Hassani identifies as genderqueer and genderfluid, being comfortable with both "she" and "he" pronouns.

=== Controversies ===
Starting in December 2018, Hassani became the victim of cyber-harassment and has received homophobic and transphobic attacks and death threats. In response, the organizations Urgence Homophobie and Stop Homophobia joined forces to take legal action against anyone who has insulted, discriminated against or threatened Hassani on social networks, including Twitter. By 27 January 2019, the two organizations already identified 1,500 insulting, discriminating or hateful tweets because of his sexual orientation and/or physical appearance. Hassani later filed a complaint to those who may be potentially identified with these lawsuits, citing "insults, incitement to hatred and violence and homophobic threats".

On 1 February 2019, i24NEWS unveiled former Twitter tweets published on Hassani's account in 2014, accusing Israel of crimes against humanity and taking the defence of Dieudonné, a French comedian known for his antisemitic sketches. A few hours later, the singer claimed on a video not to be the author of these tweets, which would have been written by a relative with access to his account, adding that he was 14 years old at the time. Soon after, a parody video from 2018 resurfaced, about the latest attacks committed in France, which gave rise to a new controversy. The senator of the Alpes-Maritimes department, Henri Leroy, requested that Bilal be "dismissed urgently from the contest".

Hassani is controversial in traditionalist Catholic circles. In December 2021, he appeared on the cover of the LGBT magazine Têtu in a representation reminiscent of an icon of the Virgin Mary. On 5 April 2023, Hassani was forced to cancel a concert planned in a former basilica that became a concert hall in Metz after threats from a group of far-right radical Catholics.

== Discography ==
=== Studio albums ===
Title	Details	Peak chart positions		Units
Title	Details	FRA	BEL (WA)	Units
Kingdom	Released: 26 April 2019; Label: Low Wood; Formats: CD, digital download, streaming	24	68	FRA: ~35,000
Contre soirée	Released: 6 November 2020; Label: Low Wood; Formats: CD, digital download, streaming	36	—	
Théorème	Released: 7 October 2022; Label: House of Hassani; Formats: CD, digital download, streaming	43	—	
Bonsoir Paris	Released: 28 August 2026; Label: House of Hassani; Formats: CD, digital download, streaming	82	—	
"—" denotes a recording that did not chart or was not released.

=== Mixtapes ===
Title	Details
Glitter Sleaze Utopia	Released: 7 June 2024; Label: House of Hassani; Formats: CD, digital download, streaming

=== Live albums ===
Title	Details
L'affreuse	Released: 28 March 2025; Label: House of Hassani; Formats: CD, digital download, streaming

=== Singles ===
Title	Year	Peak chart positions		Album
Title	Year	FRA	BEL (WA)	Album
"Wanna Be"	2016	—	—	Non-album singles
"Follow Me"	2017	—	—	Non-album singles
"House Down"	2017	—	—	Non-album singles
"Shadows"	2018	—	—	Non-album singles
"Heaven with You" (with Anton Wick)	2018	—	—	Non-album singles
"Hot City" (with Leon Markcus)	2018	—	—	Non-album singles
"Mash Up" (Copines x Tout oublier)	2018	—	—	Non-album singles
"Roi"	2019	23	— (Note: "Roi" did not enter the Ultratop (Wallonia) charts, but peaked at number 4 on the Ultratip Chart.)	Kingdom
"Jaloux"	2019	—	—	Kingdom
"Fais beleck"	2019	—	—	Kingdom
"Je danse encore"	2019	—	—	Kingdom
"Fais le vide"	2020	—	—	Contre soirée
"Dead Bae"	2020	—	—	Contre soirée
"Tom"	2020	—	—	Contre soirée
"Lights Off"	2021	—	—	Non-album singles
"Baby"	2021	—	—	Non-album singles
"Il ou elle"	2022	—	—	Théorème
"Transfert trottinette"	2022	—	—	Théorème
"Tout est OK"	2022	—	—	Théorème
"Iconic"	2023	—	—	Théorème (Iconic Edition)
"Alter Ego"	2024	—	—	Glitter Sleaze Utopia
"2MO2"	2024	—	—	Glitter Sleaze Utopia
"La Question"	2025	—	—	L'affreuse
"Beaucoup"	2026	—	—	Bonsoir Paris
"Capitale"	2026	—	—	Bonsoir Paris
"—" denotes a recording that did not chart or was not released.

== Awards and nominations ==
Year	Award	Category	Result
2019	NRJ Music Awards	Francophone Breakthrough of the Year	Won

== Notes ==
Preceded by Madame Monsieur with "Mercy"	France in the Eurovision Song Contest; 2019	Succeeded by Tom Leeb with "Mon alliée (The Best in Me)"
