= Malo' =

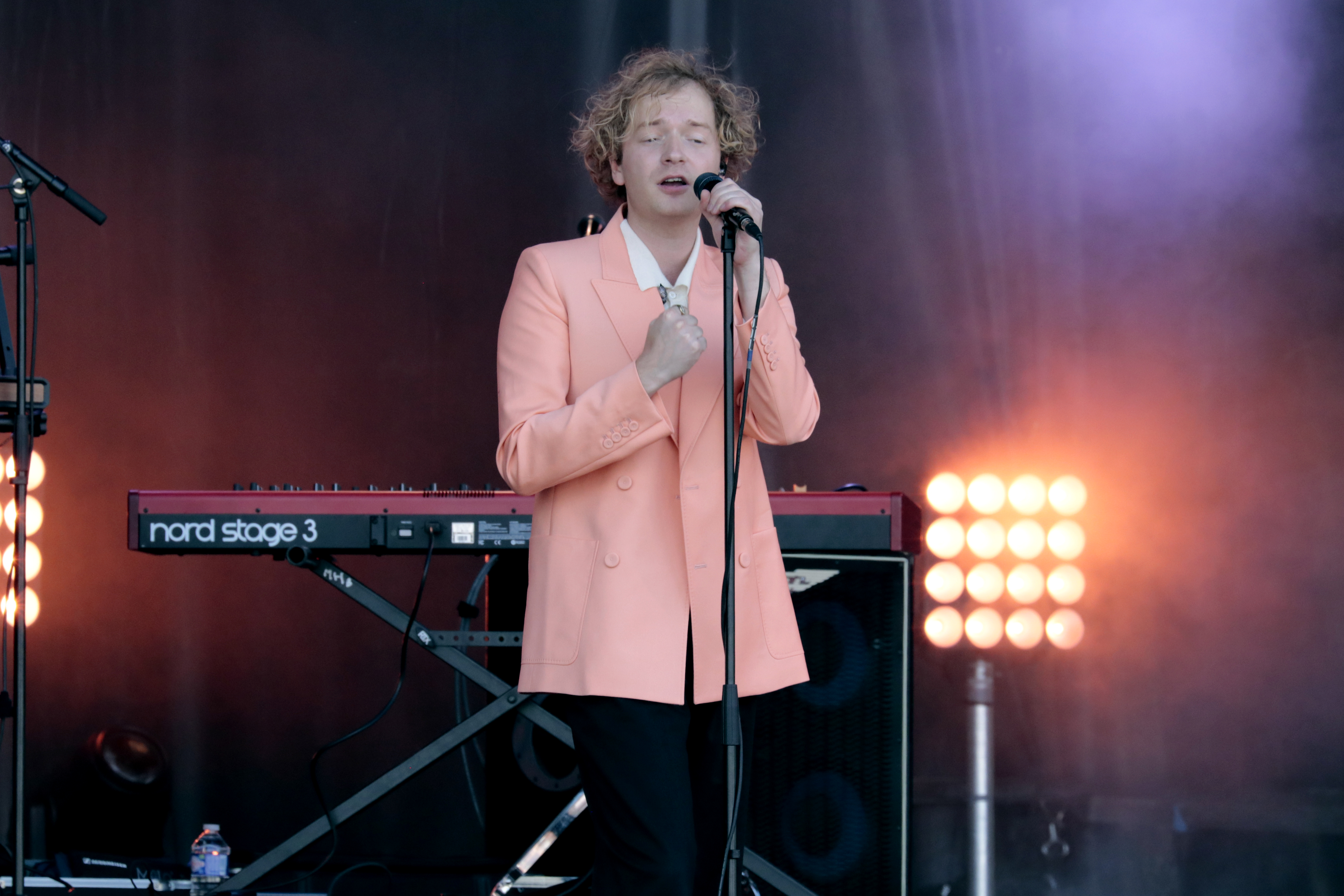

Background information
- Also known as: Malo'
- Born: Malory Legardinier; April 20, 1994 (age 32); Caen, Normandy, France
- Origin: Singer; songwriter
- Years active: 2013–present
- Labels: Columbia Records, Sony Music Entertainment
- Website: www.malo.tv

Malory Legardinier (born 1994), known professionally as Malo', is a French singer and songwriter. He was born in Caen. Malory studied at Barrenjoey High School.

== Career ==
Malo' released his debut studio album Be / Être on 23 June 2017. The album peaked at number 167 on the French Albums Chart. On 29 December 2017, Malo' was confirmed as the first artist competing in Destination Eurovision the national final organised by France 2 to select France's entry for the Eurovision Song Contest 2018. He performed during the first semi-final which was filmed on 8 January 2018 and aired on 13 January 2018. He performed a cover of "Wasting My Young Years" by London Grammar and his Eurovision song "Ciao". He progressed to the Final after finishing third in the semi-final. Results in the semi-final were determined by a Francophone jury panel and an international jury panel. The final aired live on 27 January 2018. In the final, he placed seventh with the international juries but placed second with the French public, meaning he finished third overall behind Lisandro Cuxi and winners Madame Monsieur.

== Discography ==
=== Albums ===
Title	Details	Peak chart positions
Title	Details	FRA
Be / Être	Released: 23 June 2017; Label: Sony Music Entertainment; Format: Digital download, CD	167

=== Singles ===
Title	Year	Peak chart positions	Album
Title	Year	FRA	Album
"I Believed"	2017	131	Be / Être
"Ciao"	2018	45	Non-album single
"—" denotes a single that did not chart or was not released.
