= Jaloux =

Jaloux means jealous in French. It is also a surname. It may refer to:

== People ==
- Edmond Jaloux (1878-1949), French novelist, essayist, and critic

== Film and television ==
- Jaloux, French title for the 2010 Canadian film Suspicious directed by Patrick Demers
- L'amant jaloux, full title L'amant jaloux, ou Les fausses apparences, a French comédie mêlée d'ariettes in three acts by André Grétry

== Music ==
- "Jaloux" (Bilal Hassani song), song from his 2019 album Kingdom
- "Jaloux" (Dadju song)
- "Jaloux" (Skinz song), 2017 song by Skinz from the album Ingen Drama

== See also ==
- Morne Jaloux, a town in Saint George Parish, Grenada
- Jealous (disambiguation)
