= Tom Leeb =

French singer (born 1989)

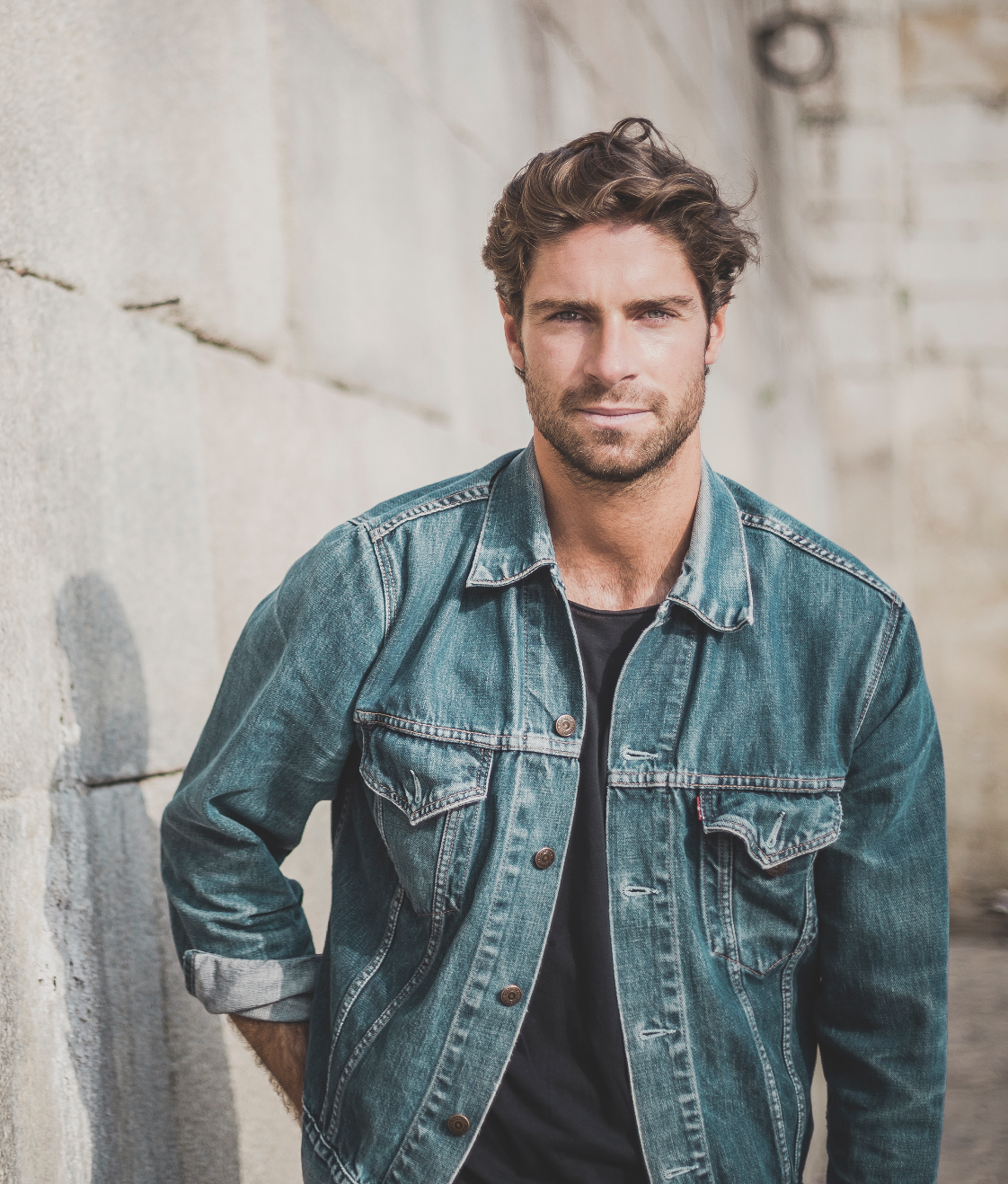
- Leeb in 2018
- Born: March 21, 1990 (age 36); Paris, France
- Occupation: Singer
- Relatives: Michel Leeb (father), Fanny Leeb (sister)
- Musical career
- Genres: Pop; indie folk; folk rock
- Instruments: Vocals, guitar
- Years active: 2018–present
- Label: Roy Music

Tom Leeb (born 21 March 1990) is a French singer. He was selected to represent France in the Eurovision Song Contest 2020 in Rotterdam, the Netherlands, with the song "Mon alliée (The Best in Me)", but the competition was cancelled because of the COVID-19 pandemic.

== Family ==
Leeb is the son of humorist Michel Leeb and journalist Béatrice Malicet, Tom Leeb was born in Paris in 1989. He is the youngest in the family, after Fanny (born in 1986) and Elsa (born in 1988).

== Career ==
In 2003, he played in the theater with his father in Madame Doubtfire. He studied theater, cinema, singing and dance in New York for five years.

In 2013, he was chosen for the role of Tom in the series Sous le soleil de Saint-Tropez, then played the role of Adrien in an episode Section de recherches. The same year, he played in the film Paroles.

He appeared in the film My Summer in Provence, with Jean Reno in 2014. The same year, he formed a comic duet with the actor Kevin Levy, and they created their first show Kevin et Tom. The two comedians were the opening act of Gad Elmaleh at the Olympia then went on tour on Parisian stages. In parallel with their show, they launched mini-video sequences titled: "How ...".

In March 2018, he released his first single "Are We Too Late" under the Roy Music label.

On 14 January 2020, the public national television channel France 2 announced that it has selected Tom Leeb to represent France at the Eurovision Song Contest 2020, scheduled for May 16, with his song "Mon alliée (The Best in Me)". The competition was cancelled on March 18 due to the COVID-19 pandemic. On June 19, 2020, Leeb confirmed that he would not represent France in the Eurovision Song Contest 2021.

== Discography ==
=== Studio albums ===
Title	Details
Recollection	Released: 20 September 2019; Label: Cristal Groupe, Roy Music; Formats: Digital download, CD
Silver Lining	Released: 25 September 2020; Label: Cristal Groupe, Roy Music; Formats: Digital download, CD
Bedrock	Released: 6 December 2024; Label: Cristal Groupe, Roy Music; Formats: Digital download, CD

=== Extended plays ===
Title	Details
Tom Leeb	Released: 21 September 2018; Label: Cristal Groupe, Roy Music; Formats: Digital download

=== Singles ===
Title	Year	Album or EP
"Are We Too Late"	2018	Tom Leeb
"Go On"	2018	Tom Leeb
"Sun"	2019	Recollection
"Mon alliée (The Best in Me)" or "The Best in Me"	2020	Recollection (Extended Version)
"Si tu savais"	2020	Silver Lining
"Run Away" (featuring Jérôme Queriaud)	2020	Silver Lining
"You Got Something"	2020	Silver Lining
"Anywhere You're Not" (Acoustic Version)	2023	Non-album single
"Brothers"	2023	Bedrock
"Blood to Fire"	2023	Bedrock
"Nobody Knows Me Like You Do"	2023	Bedrock
"Brand New Day"	2023	Bedrock
"When a Man Needs a Woman" (Live at Alhambra Studios)	2023	Bedrock
"This Love"	2024	Bedrock
"Breakaway"	2024	Bedrock
"Somebody Else"	2024	Bedrock
"You'll Be Alright"	2024	Bedrock
"Wherever Leads the Road"	2024	Bedrock
"Home"	2024	Bedrock

== Filmography ==
=== Movies ===
- 2013: Paroles by Véronique Mucret Rouveyrollis
- 2014: My Summer in Provence (French : Avis de mistral) by Rose Bosch : Tiago
- 2017: Jour-J by Reem Kherici : Gabriel
- 2017: Overdrive by Antonio Negret : the American tourist n°2
- 2017: Mon poussin by Frédéric Forestier : Romain
- 2017: Papillon by Michael Noer : lawyer Dega
- 2017: The New Adventures of Cinderella (French : Les Nouvelles Aventures de Cendrillon) by Lionel Steketee : the dwarf Relou
- 2019: Edmond by Alexis Michalik : Leo Volny
- 2020: C'est la vie of Julien Rambaldi : Jérôme
- 2021: Spoiled Brats by Nicolas Cuche Netflix
- 2021: Stuck Together by Dany Boon - Sam (Netflix)
- 2021: Pierre & Jeanne by Clémentine Célarié from a work of Guy de Maupassant
- 2023: Nouveau départ by Philippe Lefebvre : Stéphane
- 2023: Dogman by Luc Besson : Bradley
- 2024: Le vent des sables by Stéphane Kappes (France 3) : Olivier Finer
- 2024: Le livreur de Noël by Cécilia Rouaud (France 2) : Julien
- 2024: Les cadeaux by Raphaële Moussafir and Christophe Offenstein : Dan

=== Short films ===
- 2009: One Shot by Miguel Parga
- 2013: Subtitles by Allan Duboux and himself
- 2015: This New Generation by himself : Joe
- 2017: Lola & Eddie by Charlotte Karas and Jordan Goldnadel : Eddie
- 2016: Happy Anniversary by Franck Victor
- 2017: Unexpected by Jessy Langlois : Jeremy
- 2017: Momentum by David Solal : Ron
- 2016: Jeux de grands by Celine Gaudry
- 2021: “Des Corps” de Tom Leeb

=== TV shows ===
- 2013 - 2014: Sous le soleil de Saint-Tropez : Tom Drancourt (seasons 1 and 2)
- 2014: Section de recherches : David Bréand (season 8, episode 9 : Cyrano )
- 2018: Nina : Anto (season 4, episode 4 : D'abord ne pas nuire )
- 2020: “Infidèle” Saison 2 TF1 - Gabriel
- 2021: “Plan B” saison 1 TF1 - Manu
- 2021: Scènes de ménages M6
- 2022: L'amour (presque) parfait France 2 - Stéphane
- 2022: Women at War TF1 - Joseph Duvernet
- 2023: A casa tutti bene Sky Italia - George Solari
- 2026: Cat's Eyes TF1 - Lucas Svejic / Le Marquis

== Theater ==
- 2003: Madame Doubtfire, adapted by Albert Algoud, directed by Daniel Roussel, Théâtre de Paris
- 2013: Kevin & Tom

Preceded by Bilal Hassani with "Roi"	France in the Eurovision Song Contest; 2020 (cancelled)	Succeeded by Barbara Pravi with "Voilà"
