= Nassi (singer) =

French singer-songwriter of Moroccan origin (born 1986)

- Born: March 21, 1986 (age 40); Perpignan, France
- Genres: Hip-hop
- Occupations: Rapper; singer; songwriter

Nassim Arrami (born 21 March, 1986), better known by his stage name Nassi, is a French rapper, singer and songwriter of Moroccan origin, born in Perpignan, France.

== Biography ==
Nassi started writing songs at the age of 11, influenced by rap and urban music.

Before deciding to "eat chicken nuggets" and start a singing career, he had written songs for other artists, such as Kendji Girac, Claudio Capéo, Soprano and H Magnum.

In January 2017, he released his debut solo single, titled "La vie est belle", which reached number 100 on the French singles chart in April and would eventually be certified Gold by the French national syndicate for music publishing (SNEP).

This was followed by the single "Pas fatigué" in June.

In addition to several singles, Nassi has released his album "Arabesque" in 3 volumes.

In 2018, Nassi had a shot at representing France at that year's Eurovision Song Contest with his song "Rêves de gamin", reaching the final of the national preliminaries (televised on France 2 under the title Destination Eurovision).

Nassi's music has been featured in the educational song competition "Manie Musicale" in 2020, 2022, and 2023.

== Musical style ==
Nassi self-identifies as "a singer, not a rapper".

== Discography ==
=== Singles ===
- "Je pense à nous" (Akela feat. Nassi) [Radio Edit] (2015)
- "La vie est belle" (2017)
- "Pas Fatigué" (2017)
- "Rêves de gamin" (2018)
- "Mes yeux" (2018)
- "Dancing" (2019)
- "Choix de vie" (Anas feat. Nassi) (2019)
- "À la dérive" (2019)
- "Toi et moi" (2019)
- "Souhila" (2020)
- "Wana" (2022)
- "Rifia" (2022)
