= Alexis Langlois =

French film director and screenwriter

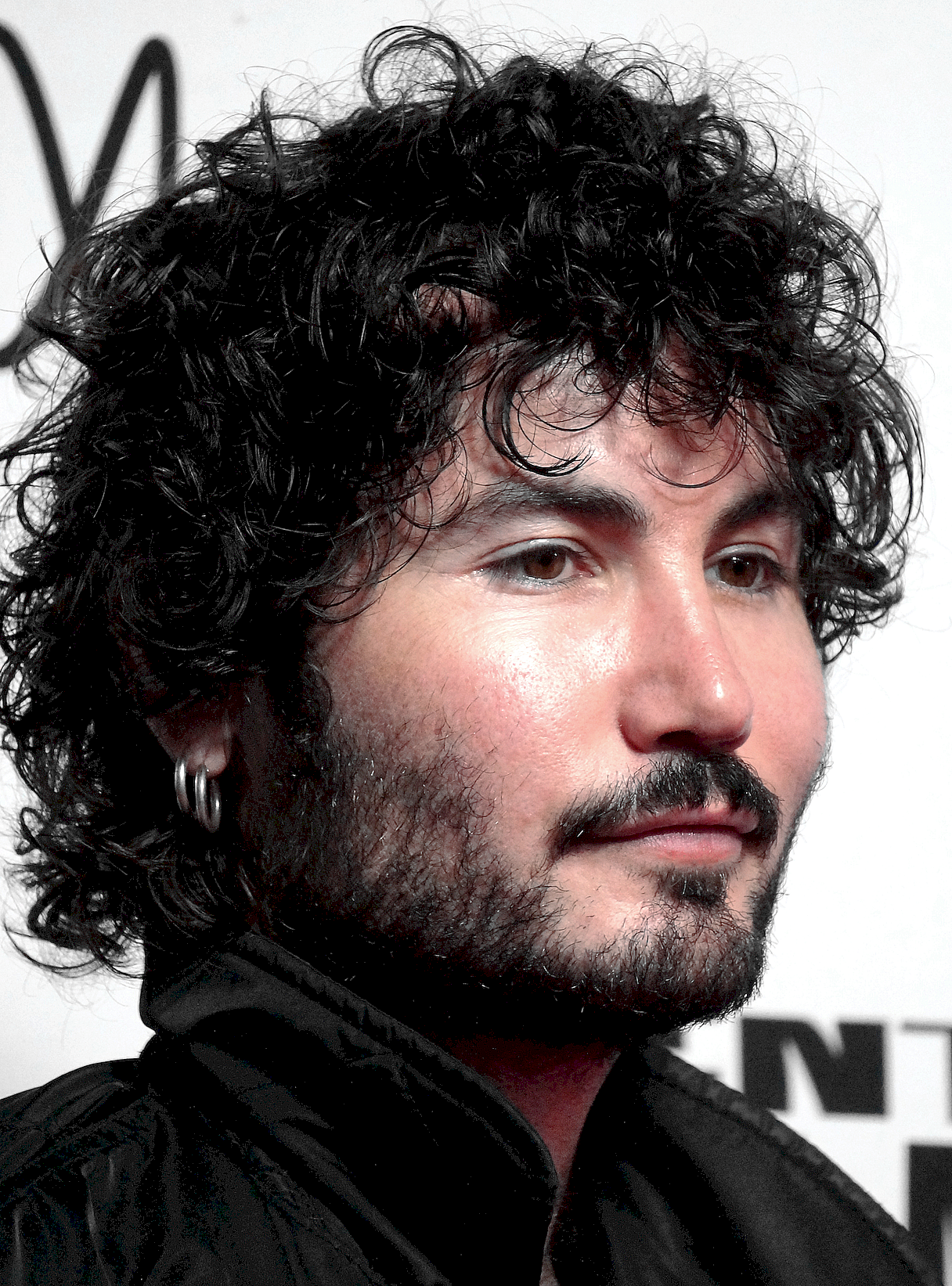
- Alexis Langlois at the showing of 'Les reines du drame', Film Fest Gent 2024
- Born: 1989
- Education: Paris 8 University Vincennes-Saint-Denis
- Occupations: Film director; screenwriter
- Notable work: The Demons of Dorothy (Les Démons de Dorothy)
- Relatives: Justine Langlois (sister)

Alexis Langlois (born 1989) is a French film director and screenwriter.

== Life and career ==
A native of Le Havre, Normandy, they moved to Paris in 2007 to study film at Paris 8 University Vincennes-Saint-Denis and the École nationale supérieure d'arts de Paris-Cergy.

They directed a number of short films, the most noted of which, The Demons of Dorothy (Les Démons de Dorothy), won the Pardino d’argento SRG SSR for the International Competition at the 74th Locarno Film Festival in 2021. They have also been a two-time finalist for the Iris Prize, for Terror, Sisters! (De la terreur, mes soeurs!) in 2021 and for The Demons of Dorothy in 2022.

They also directed "Marathon", a 2023 music video for pop singer Bilal Hassani which also starred porn actor François Sagat.

Their debut feature film Queens of Drama (Les Reines du drame) premiered in the Critics' Week program at the 2024 Cannes Film Festival.

== Personal life ==
Their sister, Justine Langlois, is an actress who regularly appears in their films.

== Filmography ==
- Mascarade - 2012
- Je vous réserve tous mes baisers - 2014
- Trinkets and Dark Thoughts (Fanfreluches et idées noires) - 2016
- Your Young Years Will Dry Your Tears (À ton âge le chagrin c'est vite passé) - 2017
- Debout demain - 2017
- Terror, Sisters! (De la terreur, mes soeurs!) - 2019
- The Demons of Dorothy (Les Démons de Dorothy) - 2021
- Queens of Drama (Les Reines du drame) - 2024
