= Kingdom (Bilal Hassani album) =

Studio album by Bilal Hassani
- Released: 26 April 2019
- Recorded: 2018
- Genre: Pop
- Label: Low Wood

Bilal Hassani chronology
Kingdom (2019)	Contre soirée (2020)

Singles from Kingdom
- 1. "Roi" Released: 11 January 2019; 2. "Jaloux" Released: 21 March 2019; 3. "Fais Beleck" Released: 22 March 2019; 4. "Je Danse Encore" Released: 6 September 2019; 5. "Monarchie Absolue" Released: 11 October 2019

Kingdom is the debut studio album by French singer Bilal Hassani. The album was released by Low Wood on 26 April 2019. The album peaked at number twenty-four on the French Albums Chart. The album includes the singles "Roi", "Jaloux" and "Fais beleck".

== Singles ==
"Roi" was released the lead single from the album on 11 January 2019. The song peaked at number 23 on the French Singles Chart. The song will represent France at the Eurovision Song Contest 2019 in Tel Aviv, Israel. "Jaloux" was released the second single from the album on 21 March 2019. "Fais beleck" was released the third single from the album on 22 March 2019.

== Track listing ==
No.	Title	Writer(s)	Length
1.	"Welcome to My Kingdom"		1:17
2.	"Panic"		3:28
3.	"Roi"	Bilal Hassani; Emilie Sattonet; Jean Karl Lucas; Medeline	2:58
4.	"Poison"		3:26
5.	"Jaloux"		2:56
6.	"Qui cala?"		3:04
7.	"Fais beleck"		2:51
8.	"The Flow"		4:21
9.	"Boom X3"		3:35
10.	"Basic"		3:18
11.	"O.N.C"		2:54
12.	"Dans mon seum"		3:07
13.	"Famous"		3:20
14.	"Over You"		2:37
15.	"You Should Have Let Me Love You"		3:17

== Charts ==
=== Weekly charts ===
Chart (2019)	Peak position
Belgian Albums (Ultratop Wallonia)	68
French Albums (SNEP)	24

=== Year-end charts ===
Chart (2019)	Position
French Albums (SNEP)	184

== Release history ==
Region	Date	Format	Label
France	26 April 2019	CD; digital download; streaming	Low Wood
