= France in the Eurovision Song Contest 2018 =

- Eurovision Song Contest 2018
- Participating broadcaster: France Télévisions
- Country: France
- Selection process: Destination Eurovision
- Selection date: 27 January 2018

Competing entry
- Song: "Mercy"
- Artist: Madame Monsieur
- Songwriters: Émilie Satt; Jean-Karl Lucas

Placement
- Final result: 13th, 173 points

Participation chronology

France was represented at the Eurovision Song Contest 2018 with the song "Mercy" written by Émilie Satt and Jean-Karl Lucas, and performed by themselves as Madame Monsieur. The French entry for the 2018 contest in Lisbon, Portugal was selected through the national selection Destination Eurovision, organised by the French broadcaster France Télévisions in collaboration with the television channel France 2. The selection consisted of two semi-finals and a final. Madame Monsieur became the winner, placing third with the international juries but winning a landslide share of the vote from the French public, amassing enough points to win the competition. This was the first time France used a national final since 2014.

As a member of the "Big Five", France automatically qualified to compete in the final of the Eurovision Song Contest.

== Background ==
Before the 2018 contest, France had participated in the Eurovision Song Contest sixty times since its debut as one of seven countries to take part in 1956. France first won the contest in 1958 with "Dors, mon amour" performed by André Claveau. In the 1960s, they won three times, with "Tom Pillibi" performed by Jacqueline Boyer in 1960, "Un premier amour" performed by Isabelle Aubret in 1962 and "Un jour, un enfant" performed by Frida Boccara, who won in 1969 in a four-way tie with the Netherlands, Spain and the United Kingdom. France's fifth victory came in 1977, when Marie Myriam won with the song "L'oiseau et l'enfant". France has also finished second four times, with Paule Desjardins in 1957, Catherine Ferry in 1976, Joëlle Ursull in 1990 and Amina in 1991, who lost out to Sweden's Carola in a tie-break. Since 2000, France has managed to place within the top ten four times, with Natasha St-Pier finishing fourth in 2001, Sandrine François finishing fifth in 2002, Patricia Kaas finishing eighth in 2009 and Amir finishing sixth in 2016. In 2017, France was represented by Alma and the song "Requiem". The country ended in twelfth place with 135 points.

The French national broadcaster, France Télévisions, broadcasts the event within France and delegates the selection of the nation's entry to the television channel France 2. The French broadcaster had used both national finals and internal selection to choose the French entry in the past. The 2014 French entry was selected via a national final that featured three competing acts. Since 2015, the broadcaster had opted to internally select the French entry. For their 2018 entry, it was announced on 21 June 2017 that the broadcaster would organise a national final.

== Before Eurovision ==
=== Destination Eurovision ===
Destination Eurovision was the national final organised by France 2 to select France's entry for the Eurovision Song Contest 2018. The competition consisted of two semi-finals on 13 and 20 January 2018 and a final on 27 January 2018, all produced at the Studio Visual – Bât 210 in Saint-Denis and broadcast on France 2, TV5Monde and TV5 Québec Canada. All three shows in the competition were hosted by French-Canadian singer Garou.

==== Format ====
The format of the competition consisted of three shows: two pre-recorded semi-finals on 13 and 20 January 2018, and a live final on 27 January 2018. Nine entries competed in each semi-final, from which four were selected to advance to the final from each show. Results during the semi-finals were determined by the combination of votes from two jury groups: a three-member Francophone jury panel and a three-member international jury panel.

The Francophone jury panel consisted of:

- Amir – French singer, songwriter, represented France in the 2016 Contest (replaced by Alma during the final)
- Isabelle Boulay – French Canadian singer
- Christophe Willem – French singer

The international jury panel consisted of:

- Christer Björkman – Head of Delegation for Sweden at Eurovision, supervisor of Melodifestivalen
- Nicola Caligiore – Head of Delegation for Italy at Eurovision
- Olga Salamakha – Head of Delegation for Belarus at Eurovision

Results in the final were determined by the combination of public televoting (50%) and a ten-member international jury panel (50%). The three international jury members in the semi-finals were joined by an additional seven members from Armenia, Bulgaria, Finland, Iceland, Israel, Russia and Switzerland. The public and the juries each had a total of 420 points to award, with each jury member awarding 2, 4, 6, 8, 10 and 12 points to their top six entries. The public vote was based on the percentage of votes each song achieved through telephone and SMS voting. For example, if a song gained 10% of the viewer vote, then that entry would be awarded 10% of 420 points rounded to the nearest integer: 42 points.

==== Competing entries ====
France 2 opened a submission period on 21 June 2017 in order for interested artists and songwriters to submit their proposals through an online submission form up until the deadline on 30 November 2017. Songs were required to contain at least 70% French language lyrics with a free language allowance for the remaining lyrics. In addition to the open submissions, France 2 also requested proposals from record companies. At the closing of the deadline, the French broadcaster received 1,500 submissions. A selection committee reviewed the received submissions and selected eighteen entries to compete in the national final. The competing artists and songs were announced gradually via social media from 29 December 2017 to 7 January 2018.

Artist	Song	Songwriter(s)
Ehla	"J'ai cru"	Grand Corps Malade, Fred Savio
Emmy Liyana	"OK ou KO"	Olivier Schultheis, Zazie, Jean-Pierre Pilot, William Rousseau
Enea	"I'll Be There"	Sonia Boraso
Igit	"Lisboa Jérusalem"	Antoine Barrau, Alex Finkin
Jane Constance	"Un jour j'ai rêvé"	Jane Constance, Pascal Obispo
June The Girl	"Same"	Marine Bollengier, François Welgryn, Antoine Essertier
Lisandro Cuxi	"Eva"	Felipe Saldivia, Fred Savio, Freddy Marche
Louka	"Mamma Mia"	Maître Gims, Vitaa, Renaud Rebillaud, Luca Bennici
Lucie Vagenheim	"My World"	François Welgryn, William Rousseau, Mathieu Johann
Madame Monsieur	"Mercy"	Émilie Satt, Jean-Karl Lucas
Malo'	"Ciao"	Malory Legardinier
Masoe	"Paradis"	Dany Synthé, Jonah
Max Cinnamon	"Ailleurs"	Max Cinnamon, Stéphanie Petrequin
Nassi	"Rêves de gamin"	Nassi, Raphaël Nyadjiko
Noée	"L'un près de l'autre"	Barbara Pravi, Tomislav Matosin, Jules Jaconelli, Mélanie Di Petrantonio
Pheno Men	"Jamais sans toi"	François Welgryn, Gabin Lesieur, Pheno Men
Sarah Caillibot	"Tu me manques"	Sarah Caillibot
Sweem	"Là-haut"	Sweem

==== Shows ====
===== Semi-finals =====
Two pre-recorded semi-finals were held; the first semi-final was filmed on 8 January 2018 and aired on 13 January 2018, and the second semi-final was filmed on 9 January 2018 and aired on 20 January 2018. In each semi-final nine entries competed and four qualified to the final determined by the combination of votes from a three-member Francophone jury panel and a three-member international jury panel. In addition to performing their contest entry, each artist performed a cover version of a popular song.

Semi-final 1 – 13 January 2018
R/O	Artist	Song	Cover (Original artist)	Points	Place
1	Masoe	"Paradis"	"Pas là" (Vianney)	6	7
2	Noée	"L'un près de l'autre"	"Le paradis blanc" (Michel Berger)	26	6
3	Lisandro Cuxi	"Eva"	"Billie Jean" (Michael Jackson)	66	1
4	Malo'	"Ciao"	"Wasting My Young Years" (London Grammar)	46	3
5	Emmy Liyana	"OK ou KO"	"Je te promets" (Johnny Hallyday)	50	2
6	Enea	"I'll Be There"	"Tous les cris les S.O.S" (Daniel Balavoine)	0	8
7	Pheno Men	"Jamais sans toi"	"ABC" (The Jackson 5)	0	8
8	Louka	"Mamma Mia"	"Alors regarde" (Patrick Bruel)	30	4
9	Ehla	"J'ai cru"	"Time After Time" (Cyndi Lauper)	28	5

Detailed Jury Votes – Semi-final 1
R/O	Song	International Panel				Francophone Panel			
R/O	Song	C. Björkman	O. Salamakha	N. Caligiore	Total	I. Boulay	C. Willem	Amir	Total
R/O	Song	SWE	BLR	ITA	Total	I. Boulay	C. Willem	Amir	Total
1	"Paradis"				0	4	2		6
2	"L'un près de l'autre"	2	8	10	20			6	6
3	"Eva"	10	12	12	34	10	10	12	32
4	"Ciao"	8	6	6	20	12	12	2	26
5	"OK ou KO"	12	10	8	30	6	6	8	20
6	"I'll Be There"				0				0
7	"Jamais sans toi"				0				0
8	"Mamma Mia"	6	4	4	14	2	4	10	16
9	"J'ai cru"	4	2	2	8	8	8	4	20

Semi-final 2 – 20 January 2018
R/O	Artist	Song	Cover (Original artist)	Points	Place
1	Lucie Vagenheim	"My World"	"Savoir aimer" (Florent Pagny)	0	9
2	Madame Monsieur	"Mercy"	"Désenchantée" (Mylène Farmer)	56	1
3	Jane Constance	"Un jour j'ai rêvé"	"What a Wonderful World" (Louis Armstrong)	8	6
4	Nassi	"Rêves de gamin"	"Superstition" (Stevie Wonder)	46	3
5	Igit	"Lisboa Jérusalem"	"Tout va bien" (Orelsan)	46	3
6	Max Cinnamon	"Ailleurs"	"Perfect" (Ed Sheeran)	54	2
7	Sarah Caillibot	"Tu me manques"	"Tu m'oublieras" (Larusso)	8	6
8	Sweem	"Là-haut"	"Quelques mots d'amour" (Michel Berger)	26	5
9	June The Girl	"Same"	"Poupée de cire, poupée de son" (France Gall)	8	6

Detailed Jury Votes – Semi-final 2
R/O	Song	International Panel				Francophone Panel			
R/O	Song	C. Björkman	O. Salamakha	N. Caligiore	Total	I. Boulay	C. Willem	Amir	Total
R/O	Song	SWE	BLR	ITA	Total	I. Boulay	C. Willem	Amir	Total
1	"My World"				0				0
2	"Mercy"	12	10	8	30	12	12	2	26
3	"Un jour j’ai rêvé"	2		2	4			4	4
4	"Rêve de gamin"	8	6	12	26	4	4	12	20
5	"Lisboa Jérusalem"	4	12	6	22	10	8	6	24
6	"Ailleurs"	10	8	10	28	6	10	10	26
7	"Tu me manques"	6	2		8				0
8	"Là-haut"		4		4	8	6	8	22
9	"Same"			4	4	2	2		4

===== Final =====
The final aired live on 27 January 2018. The four entries that qualified from the preceding two semi-finals competed and "Mercy" performed by Madame Monsieur was selected as the winner. In addition to performing their contest entry, each artist performed a duet with a well-known artist. Alma, who represented France in the 2017 Contest, replaced Amir in the Francophone jury panel who provided feedback to the competing artists.

Final – 27 February 2018
R/O	Artist	Song	Duet	Jury	Televote	Total	Place
1	Louka	"Mamma Mia"	"Caméléon" (with Maître Gims)	8	7	15	8
2	Igit	"Lisboa Jérusalem"	"L'amour à la machine" (with Alain Souchon)	60	50	110	5
3	Emmy Liyana	"OK ou KO"	"Viens on s'aime" (with Slimane)	82	30	112	4
4	Madame Monsieur	"Mercy"	"Reine" (with Dadju)	68	118	186	1
5	Lisandro Cuxi	"Eva"	"Zombie" (with Nolwenn Leroy)	90	72	162	2
6	Max Cinnamon	"Ailleurs"	"Où je vis" (with Patrick Fiori)	54	36	90	6
7	Nassi	"Rêves de gamin"	"Elle m'a aimé" (with Gipsy Kings)	30	18	48	7
8	Malo'	"Ciao"	"Sirens Call" (with Cats on Trees)	28	89	117	3

Detailed International Jury Votes – Final
R/O	Song	Iveta Mukuchyan	Olga Salamakha	Ivan Katsarev	Terhi Norvasto	Felix Bergsson	Tali Eshkoli	Nicola Caligiore	Sergueï Pavlov	Christer Björkman	Reto Peritz	Total
R/O	Song	ARM	BLR	BUL	FIN	ISL	ISR	ITA	RUS	SWE	SWI	Total
1	"Mamma Mia"	6						2				8
2	"Lisboa Jerusalem"	8	10	8	2		10	4	8		10	60
3	"OK ou KO"	12	6	6	12	8	2	10	4	10	12	82
4	"Mercy"		8	12	6	12	6	8	6	2	8	68
5	"Eva"		12	10	4	10	12	12	12	12	6	90
6	"Ailleurs"	2	4	2	10	6	4	6	10	8	2	54
7	"Rêves de gamin"	10	2			2	8		2	6		30
8	"Ciao"	4		4	8	4				4	4	28

==== Ratings ====
Show	Date	Viewing figures		Night Rank	Source
Show	Date	Nominal	Share	Night Rank	Source
Semi-final 1	13 January 2018	2,486,000	12.4%	#3	
Semi-final 2	20 January 2018	2,084,000	10.7%	#3	
Final	27 January 2018	1,795,000	8.9%	#4	

=== Promotion ===
Madame Monsieur made appearances across Europe to specifically promote "Mercy" as the French Eurovision entry. On 17 February 2018, they performed "Mercy" at the second semi-final of Vidbir 2018 in Ukraine. They also participated in the London Eurovision Party at the Café de Paris venue in London, United Kingdom on 5 April; Israel Calling at Rabin Square in Tel Aviv, Israel on 8–11 April; the Eurovision in Concert at the AFAS Live venue in Amsterdam, Netherlands on 14 April; and the Eurovision-Spain Pre-Party at the Sala La Riviera venue in Madrid, Spain on 21 April. For the Amsterdam event, 2018 United Kingdom representative SuRie performed the English version of the song alongside Jean-Karl Lucas as Satt was unable to travel due to illness.

== At Eurovision ==
The Eurovision Song Contest 2018 took place at the Altice Arena in Lisbon, Portugal and consisted of two semi-finals on 8 and 10 May and the final on 12 May 2018. According to Eurovision rules, all nations with the exceptions of the host country and the "Big Five" (France, Germany, Italy, Spain and the United Kingdom) were required to qualify from one of two semi-finals in order to compete for the final; the top ten countries from each semi-final progressed to the final. As a member of the "Big Five", France automatically qualified to compete in the final. In addition to their participation in the final, France was also required to broadcast and vote in one of the two semi-finals. During the semi-final allocation draw on 29 January 2018, France was assigned to broadcast and vote in the second semifinal on 10 May 2018. During the second press conference that took place on 6 May, Madame Monsieur took part in a draw to determine in which half of the final the French entry would be performed. France was drawn to compete in the first half.

Once all the competing songs for the 2018 contest had been released, the running order for the grand final was decided by the shows' producers rather than through another draw, so that similar songs were not placed next to each other. France was set to perform in position 13, following the entry from Albania and preceding the entry from the Czech Republic.

In France, the two semi-finals were broadcast on France 4 with commentary by André Manoukian and Christophe Willem, while the final was broadcast on France 2 with commentary by Stéphane Bern, Christophe Willem and 2017 French Eurovision representative Alma. The spokesperson announcing the French jury results was Élodie Gossuin.

=== Final ===
The performance featured Satt and Lucas dressed in black with red accents (the duo's shoes, Satt's makeup and Lucas's guitar). They started on the main stage surrounded by fog for the first verse and chorus before separating to walk across the two bridges on either side and joining back together on the satellite stage for the remainder of the song with the onstage lighting changing from blue to orange. On the final part of the song, the duo performed their signature hand motion with the entire audience in the arena joining in.

Offstage backing vocal support was provided by Allyson Ezell and Destination Eurovision semifinalist Noée.

=== Voting ===
==== Points awarded to France ====
Points awarded to France (Final)
Score	Televote	Jury
12 points		Ukraine
10 points		Latvia; Lithuania
8 points	Belgium	Malta
7 points	Ukraine	Albania; Norway
6 points	Iceland; Israel	Croatia; Spain
5 points	Albania; Armenia; Lithuania	Bulgaria; Finland; Greece; Portugal; Sweden
4 points	Finland; Georgia; Spain	Armenia; Ireland
3 points	Poland	Belgium; Cyprus; Iceland
2 points		Denmark; Russia; Slovenia
1 point	Cyprus; Norway	

==== Points awarded by France ====
Points awarded by France (Semi-final 2)
Score	Televote	Jury
12 points	Moldova	Australia
10 points	Serbia	Latvia
8 points	Romania	Netherlands
7 points	Poland	Sweden
6 points	Australia	Malta
5 points	Denmark	Slovenia
4 points	Norway	Poland
3 points	Ukraine	Russia
2 points	Slovenia	Norway
1 point	Sweden	Romania

Points awarded by France (Final)
Score	Televote	Jury
12 points	Israel	Israel
10 points	Italy	Australia
8 points	Portugal	Germany
7 points	Estonia	Austria
6 points	Moldova	Netherlands
5 points	Spain	Sweden
4 points	Ukraine	Czech Republic
3 points	Cyprus	United Kingdom
2 points	Denmark	Slovenia
1 point	Serbia	Ireland

==== Detailed voting results ====
The following members comprised the French jury:

- Cyril Taïeb (jury chairperson) – artist
- Élodie Suigo – radio host
- Léa Luciani (Ehla) – artist, singer
- Clémentine Boulard – music and TV journalist
- Benjamin Marciano – artistic director

Detailed voting results from France (Semi-final 2)
R/O	Country	Jury							Televote	
R/O	Country	É. Suigo	Ehla	C. Boulard	B. Marciano	C. Taïeb	Rank	Points	Rank	Points
01	Norway	9	8	6	10	13	9	2	7	4
02	Romania	3	14	16	15	15	10	1	3	8
03	Serbia	15	15	15	16	16	17		2	10
04	San Marino	11	9	18	14	7	11		17	
05	Denmark	12	13	10	9	11	14		6	5
06	Russia	13	6	5	8	6	8	3	13	
07	Moldova	17	18	12	13	5	13		1	12
08	Netherlands	6	4	3	4	2	3	8	12	
09	Australia	2	1	2	1	4	1	12	5	6
10	Georgia	18	17	13	18	17	18		15	
11	Poland	7	5	8	6	8	7	4	4	7
12	Malta	4	10	9	3	3	5	6	16	
13	Hungary	16	16	14	12	9	15		11	
14	Latvia	5	2	1	2	12	2	10	14	
15	Sweden	10	3	4	7	1	4	7	10	1
16	Montenegro	14	12	17	17	18	16		18	
17	Slovenia	1	7	7	5	10	6	5	9	2
18	Ukraine	8	11	11	11	14	12		8	3

Detailed voting results from France (Final)
R/O	Country	Jury							Televote	
R/O	Country	É. Suigo	Ehla	C. Boulard	B. Marciano	C. Taïeb	Rank	Points	Rank	Points
01	Ukraine	18	12	15	18	23	19		7	4
02	Spain	12	17	22	19	13	16		6	5
03	Slovenia	5	6	12	4	25	9	2	25	
04	Lithuania	10	18	17	22	20	17		19	
05	Austria	4	3	6	8	5	4	7	14	
06	Estonia	20	24	14	17	15	22		4	7
07	Norway	19	7	9	16	17	12		16	
08	Portugal	9	9	7	12	21	11		3	8
09	United Kingdom	6	13	10	3	8	8	3	15	
10	Serbia	24	21	23	25	24	25		10	1
11	Germany	1	4	1	6	9	3	8	11	
12	Albania	15	14	18	20	18	20		17	
13	France									
14	Czech Republic	8	8	8	5	4	7	4	13	
15	Denmark	14	22	16	14	16	18		9	2
16	Australia	2	2	2	1	7	2	10	23	
17	Finland	16	10	19	13	14	14		24	
18	Bulgaria	23	25	21	21	22	24		21	
19	Moldova	21	11	20	24	10	15		5	6
20	Sweden	13	15	4	7	2	6	5	18	
21	Hungary	22	23	24	23	19	23		22	
22	Israel	3	1	5	2	1	1	12	1	12
23	Netherlands	7	5	3	9	6	5	6	20	
24	Ireland	11	16	11	11	3	10	1	12	
25	Cyprus	25	19	25	15	12	21		8	3
26	Italy	17	20	13	10	11	13		2	10
