= Larusso =

French singer (born 1979)

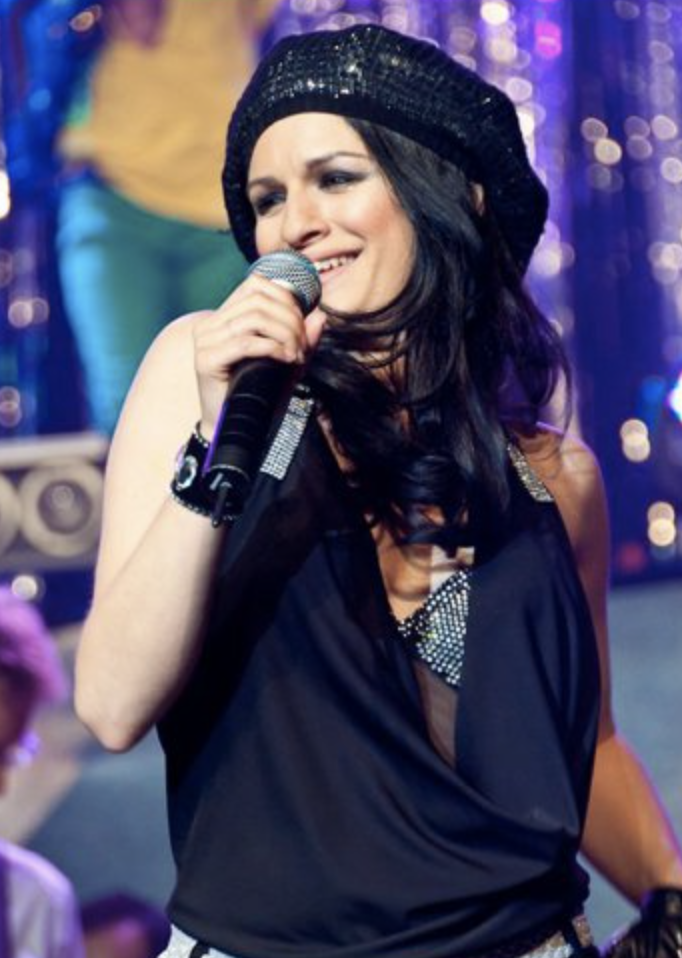
- Larusso performing in 2011

Background information
- Born: Laetitia Serero; 11 October 1979 (age 46); Paris, France
- Genres: Pop
- Occupation: Singer
- Instrument: Vocals
- Years active: 1997–present

Larusso (born Laetitia Serero; 11 October 1979) is a French singer. She won the second edition of The Masked Singer France in 2020.

She popularized songs such as "Tu m'oublieras" and "Je survivrai", the latter sung by Régine in the 1980s, which is a French adaptation of "I Will Survive" by Gloria Gaynor.

== Discography ==
=== Albums ===
- Simplement (1999)
1. Intro concert
2. "Il suffira"
3. "Tu m'oublieras"
4. "Rien ne peut séparer"
5. "Et je vivrai à travers toi"
6. "On ne s'aimera plus jamais"
7. "Bouge de ma vie"
8. "1,2,3 Here We Go" (Instrumental)
9. "Je survivrai" ("I Will Survive")
10. "Si le ciel"
11. "Come Back To Me"
12. Outro ("The End of the Story")
13. "On ne s'aimera plus jamais" (Groove Brothers Club Mix)
14. "Tu m'oublieras" (Hip Hop Mix)
- Larusso (2001)
1. "Entre nous"
2. "Tous unis" ("Give Me Love")
3. "Prends garde à toi"
4. "Habibi"
5. "Les pages de l'album"
6. "Danse la nuit" ("Dance All Night")
7. "Quoi qu'ils pensent"
8. "Même si la vie"
9. "J'attends tout"
10. "D'ici ou d'ailleurs"
11. "J'ai samplé tes mots d'amour"
12. "Il faut se le dire"

=== Singles ===
- "Je survivrai" (1997)
- "Tu m'oublieras" (1998)
- "On ne s'aimera plus jamais" (1999)
- "Il suffira" (1999)
- "Come Back to Me" (2000)
- "Tous unis" (2001)
- "Entre nous" (2001)
