= Mon alliée (The Best in Me) =

2020 song by Tom Leeb

Single by Tom Leeb

from the album Recollection (Extended Version)
- Released: 16 February 2020 (original); 3 April 2020 (revamped)
- Length: 3:00
- Label: Roy Music
- Songwriters: John Lundvik; Amir Haddad; Tom Leeb; Léa Ivanne

Tom Leeb singles chronology
"Sun" (2019)	"Mon alliée (The Best in Me)" (2020)	"Si tu savais" (2020)

Eurovision Song Contest 2020 entry
- Country: France
- Artist: Tom Leeb
- Composers: Thomas G:son; Peter Boström
- Lyricists: John Lundvik; Amir Haddad; Tom Leeb; Léa Ivanne

Finals performance
- Final result: Contest cancelled

Entry chronology
- ◄ "Roi" (2019)
- "Voilà" (2021) ►

"Mon alliée (The Best in Me)" (French pronunciation: [mɔ̃n‿alje], transl. My Ally), previously titled "The Best in Me" is a song by French singer Tom Leeb. It was chosen to represent France in the Eurovision Song Contest 2020, before the contest was cancelled due to the COVID-19 pandemic. The original song was released as a digital download on 16 February 2020 while the revamped song was released on 3 April 2020.

== Background ==
The song was written by John Lundvik, Amir Haddad, Tom Leeb and Léa Ivanne. The song is a multi-lingual French-English power ballad and, as with France's previous internal selections in 2016 and 2017, the verses are in French and the chorus is in English. After receiving more than one hundred songs written, the TV network convened several listening committees to pick the best entry. Everyone agreed on the chosen song, with some describing it as love at first listen. Three of the main selection criteria were universality, emotion and capacity of the song to make the audience "live an experience". The listening committee included professionals from the music industry and France Télévision members. The delegation previously testified how magical the moment was when the artist and song first came together.

The song was debuted live at an event at the Eiffel Tower in Paris on 16 February 2020.

== Eurovision Song Contest ==
The song would have represented France in the Eurovision Song Contest 2020, after Tom Leeb was internally selected by the national broadcaster France 2. As France is a member of the "Big Five", the song automatically advanced to the final, which would have been held on 16 May 2020 in Rotterdam, Netherlands. The contest was cancelled due to the COVID-19 pandemic.

The choice of a song primarily in English (with an English title) to represent France at Eurovision generated controversy, with the Minister for Culture, Franck Riester, responding to a question in the National Assembly Foreign Affairs Committee: "It's true that the chorus is in English, it broke my ears a little this morning on the radio ... I conveyed the message of my astonishment at a song whose chorus is written in English. Everyone must set an example to ensure that France is carried with pride everywhere, all the time." This echoed similar public criticism received on Sébastien Tellier's song 'Divine', which was selected to represent France in the 2008 contest.

== Release history ==
Region	Date	Format	Label	Ref.
Various	16 February 2020	Digital download, streaming	Roy Music	
Various	3 April 2020	Digital download, streaming	Roy Music	

== Charts ==
Chart (2020)	Peak position
Belgium (Ultratip Bubbling Under Flanders)	– (Note: The song did not enter the official Belgian Ultratop 50 charts, but appeared on the Flanders Ultratip Bubbling Under 50 chart.)
Belgium (Ultratip Bubbling Under Wallonia)	27
