= Tu m'oublieras =

1999 single by Larusso

Single by Larusso

from the album Simplement
- Language: French
- English title: "You Will Forget Me"
- B-side: "Je survivrai"
- Released: 26 October 1998
- Length: 3:40
- Label: Odeon
- Songwriters: Yves Dessca; Marc Hillman; R. Artoff
- Producers: Luke; Dr Swing

Larusso singles chronology
"Je survivrai" (1998)	"Tu m'oublieras" (1998)	"On ne s'aimera plus jamais" (1999)

"Tu m'oublieras" (English: "You Will Forget Me") is a song by French singer Larusso. It was the second single from her debut album, Simplement, and was released on 26 October 1998. It remains Larusso's most successful single, topping the charts of France and the Wallonia region of Belgium.

== Song information ==
The song was originally performed by Irma Jackson in 1979 (as "You Will Forget"), then by Régine in 1980, then by Jeane Manson, under the title "Tu oublieras". Yves Dessca, who participated in the composition of the song, had previously written some songs for Michel Sardou and for the Eurovision Song Contest 1971. Unlike the original version, Larusso's cover contains many scats, modern gimmicks and some lyrics in English.

In France, the single charted in the top 100 for 42 weeks, from 28 November 1998. It debuted at number 34 on 28 November 1998, then climbed to number one on 31 January 1999. It stayed there for 12 weeks, totalling 26 weeks in the top 10 and 38 weeks in the top 50.

== Track listings ==
CD single

1. "Tu m'oublieras" (radio edit) – 3:40
2. "Tu m'oublieras" (unforgettable mix) – 4:53
3. "Je survivrai" – 3:57

7-inch single

1. "Tu m'oublieras" (radio edit) – 3:40
2. "Tu m'oublieras" (club mix) – 4:54

7-inch single – Remixes

1. "Tu m'oublieras" (hip hop club mix)
2. "Je survivrai" (club mix)

== Charts ==
=== Weekly charts ===
Chart (1998–1999)	Peak position
Belgium (Ultratip Bubbling Under Flanders)	14
Belgium (Ultratop 50 Wallonia)	1
Europe (Eurochart Hot 100)	6
France (SNEP)	1

=== Year-end charts ===
Chart (1999)	Position
Belgium (Ultratop 50 Wallonia)	3
Europe (Eurochart Hot 100)	12
France (SNEP)	2

== Certifications and sales ==
Region	Certification	Certified units/sales
France (SNEP)	Diamond	750,000^{*}
^{*} Sales figures based on certification alone.
