= Roi (song) =

2019 single by Bilal Hassani

Single by Bilal Hassani

from the album Kingdom
- Released: 11 January 2019
- Length: 2:57
- Songwriters: Bilal Hassani; Madame Monsieur; Medeline
- Producers: Bilal Hassani; Madame Monsieur; Medeline

Bilal Hassani singles chronology
| "Mash Up" (2018) | "Roi" (2019) | "Jaloux" (2019) |

Eurovision Song Contest 2019 entry
- Country: France
- Artist: Bilal Hassani
- Languages: French, English
- Composers: Bilal Hassani; Madame Monsieur; Medeline
- Lyricists: Bilal Hassani; Madame Monsieur

Finals performance
- Final result: 16th
- Final points: 105

Entry chronology
- ◄ "Mercy" (2018)
- "Mon alliée (The Best in Me)" (2020) ►

"Roi" (pronounced [ʁwa]; transl. King) is a song performed by French singer Bilal Hassani and written by Hassani, Madame Monsieur and Medeline. The song represented France in the Eurovision Song Contest 2019 in Tel Aviv, Israel. The song was released as a digital download on 11 January 2019 through Low Wood as the lead single from his debut studio album Kingdom.

== Composition ==
"Roi" was written by Hassani and the French duo Madame Monsieur who represented France in Eurovision Song Contest 2018.

== Eurovision Song Contest ==
On 6 December 2018, Bilal Hassani was confirmed as one of the 18 participants in Destination Eurovision 2019 with the song "Roi". He advanced from the first semi-final on 12 January 2019, after placing first with both the international jury and the public televote. He went on to compete in the final on 26 January, placing fifth with the international juries but winning a landslide share of the vote from the French public, amassing enough points to win the competition.

As France is a member of the "Big Five", the song automatically advanced to the final, held on 18 May 2019 in Tel Aviv, Israel. At the final, the song received 105 points, finishing in 16th place.

== Music video ==
On February 15, the music video was released on YouTube. It was set in a grand theatre. The visual narrative begins with Hassani on backstage in his dressing room. It shows a rarely seen glimpse of the man beneath the wig. Once he's applied his makeup and popped on his trademark blonde bob, he takes to the stage and belts out "Roi". The performance was derived from the Destination Eurovision final performance and the lyrics are dropped in the favour of moody lighting and soft-focus camerawork. However, his black outfit replete with bejeweled shoulder pads remains.

== Charts ==
| Chart (2019) | Peak position |
|---|---|
| Belgium (Ultratip Bubbling Under Wallonia) | 4 |
| France (SNEP) | 23 |
| Lithuania (AGATA) | 61 |

== Certifications ==
| Region | Certification | Certified units/sales |
|---|---|---|
| France (SNEP) | Gold | 100,000^{‡} |
^{‡} Sales+streaming figures based on certification alone.
