= Mercy (Madame Monsieur song) =

2018 single by Madame Monsieur

Single by Madame Monsieur

from the album Vu d'ici
- Released: 20 January 2018
- Genre: Electropop; French pop
- Length: 3:58
- Label: Low Wood; Play Two
- Songwriters: Émilie Satt; Jean-Karl Lucas
- Producers: Émilie Satt; Jean-Karl Lucas

Madame Monsieur singles chronology
"Tournera" (2016)	"Mercy" (2018)	"Comme une reine" (2018)

Audio sample
- file; help

Music video
- "Mercy" on YouTube

Eurovision Song Contest 2018 entry
- Country: France
- Artist: Madame Monsieur
- Language: French
- Composers: Émilie Satt; Jean-Karl Lucas
- Lyricists: Émilie Satt; Jean-Karl Lucas

Finals performance
- Final result: 13th
- Final points: 173

Entry chronology
- ◄ "Requiem" (2017)
- "Roi" (2019) ►

"Mercy" is a song written and performed by French duo Madame Monsieur made up of Émilie Satt and Jean-Karl Lucas. The song was released as a digital download on 20 January 2018 through Low Wood and Play Two as the lead single from Madame Monsieur's second studio album Vu d'ici (2018). It represented France in the Eurovision Song Contest 2018 in Lisbon, Portugal finishing 13th with a total of 173 votes.

== Composition ==
"Mercy" was written and produced by Émilie Satt and Jean-Karl Lucas. The song is about a girl named Mercy who was born to Nigerian refugees on a boat on the Mediterranean Sea in the midst of the European migrant crisis.

A Nigerian refugee woman named Taiwo Yussif went into labor while on board of the immigration rescue ship L'Aquarius operated by the humanitarian organization SOS Méditerranée. As the boat made its way to the port of Catania, in Sicily, Yussif delivered an eight-pound baby girl on 21 March 2017, and she named her Mercy. "Those people were so kind to me," she'd later say of the crew on board the ship. "I saw a lot of people dying in the sea, it was so difficult for me. I thank God to be alive with Mercy." On that same day, Madame Monsieur were in a Paris recording studio working on their debut album. "We were just chilling on Twitter and we found this picture of this baby born fifteen minutes earlier," said vocalist Émilie Satt. "It came so hard and so strong into our hearts that after a few minutes we thought maybe we should try to translate this emotion into a song."

The song is a play with words using the French word "merci" meaning "thanks" but also "mercy" like the English word and first name.

== Eurovision Song Contest ==
On 1 January 2018, Madame Monsieur were confirmed as one of the 18 participants in Destination Eurovision with the song "Mercy". They advanced from the second semi-final on 20 January, after placing first with the international jury and tying for first with the Francophone jury. They went on to compete in the final on 27 January, placing third with the international juries but winning a landslide share of the vote from the French public, amassing enough points to win the competition.

As France is a member of the "Big Five", the song automatically advanced to the final, held on 12 May 2018 in Lisbon, Portugal.

At the Eurovision Grand Final, they won the Press Marcel Bezençon Award, by being voted the best entry by the accredited media and press at the event. They finished 13th overall out of 43 participating countries.

== Commercial performance ==
The single started at number 8 on top singles sales in France. The next week, it peaked at number 3. After the Grand Final, the song rose to number 2.

== Mercy. Zo heet ik / Je m'appelle Mercy ==
There was a follow-up children's book entitled Je m'appelle Mercy (I am called Mercy). The performers Madame Monsieur had expressed their desire to publish an illustrated book telling the story of Mercy with the song lyrics. Almost simultaneously, the Dutch artist Saskia Halfmouw, inspired by the song "Mercy" had already created some illustrated artwork for the site Eurostory about the story. In 2019, the book was released by the Dutch publishing house De Eenhoorn as Mercy. Zo heet ik and in June 2020 as Je m'appelle Mercy by the French publishing house Steinkis.

In addition to the lyrics, the book contains an epilogue where Émilie Satt explains the real life of Mercy and her family also revealing that she and Jean-Karl Lucas still kept in touch with the baby and her mother. The proceeds from the sale of the book will go to Mercy and her family.

Mother and daughter Mercy ended up first in a large migrant camp in Mineo, Sicilia. They stayed there for more than a year. With help of lawyers, an NGO, and the discreet support and attention of Madame Monsieur, the small family was given the official status of refugee and was transferred to a far smaller refuge, part of a small residential building in a village in the south of Sicily.

== Track listing ==
Digital download
No.	Title	Length
1.	"Mercy"	3:58

CD single
No.	Title	Length
1.	"Mercy"	3:58
2.	"Mercy (Eurovision version)"	3:04
3.	"Mercy (English version)"	3:58
4.	"Mercy (Spanish version)"	3:58
5.	"Mercy (French remix)"	3:06
6.	"Mercy (English remix)"	3:06

== Charts ==
Chart (2018)	Peak position
Belgium (Ultratip Bubbling Under Flanders)	36
Belgium (Ultratop 50 Wallonia)	10
France (SNEP)	29
Sweden (Sverigetopplistan)	90

== Release history ==
Region	Date	Format	Label
Worldwide	20 January 2018	Digital download	Low Wood; Play Two
