= Madame Monsieur =

French duo

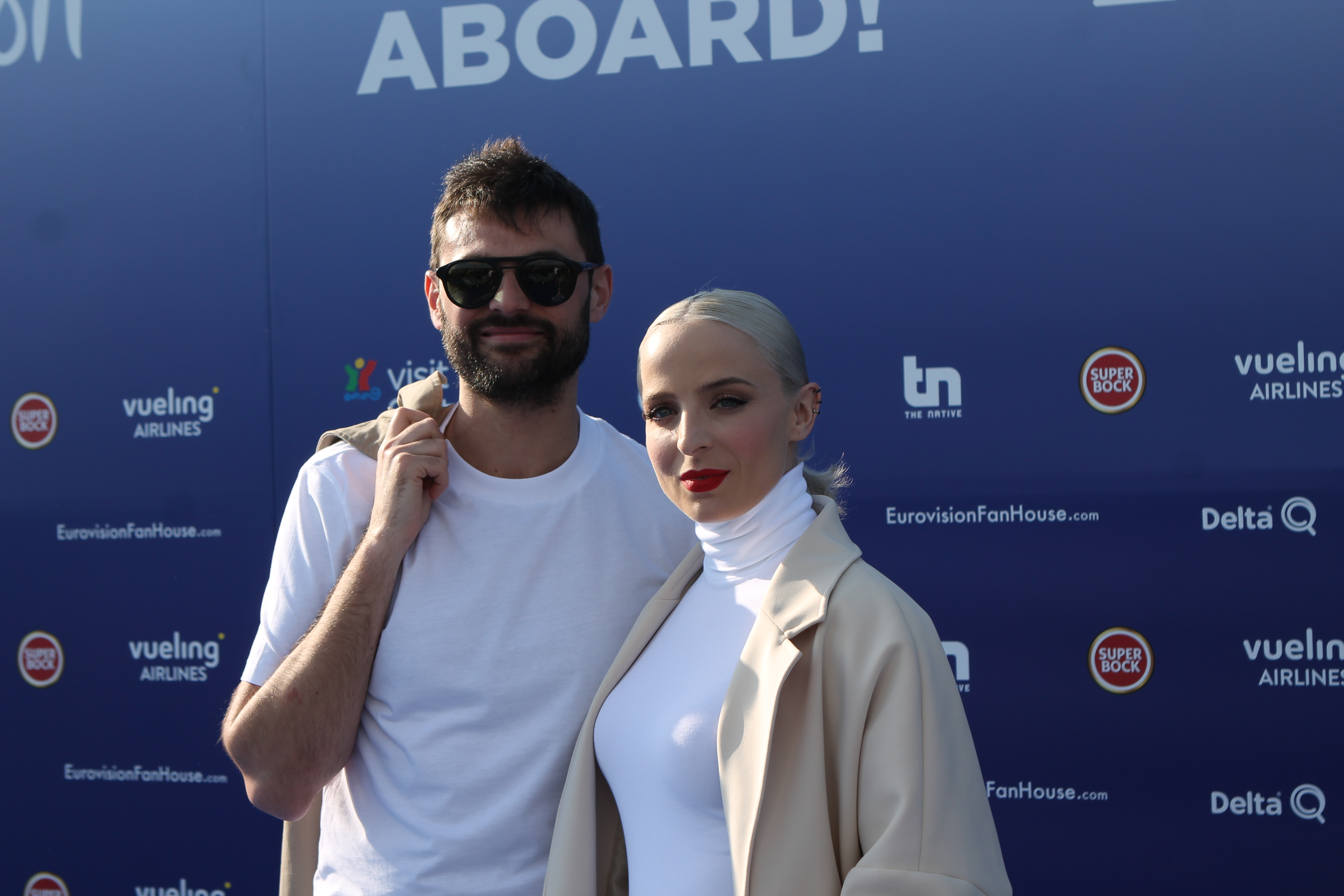
- Madame Monsieur in 2018

Background information
- Origin: France
- Genres: French pop; electropop
- Years active: 2013–present
- Labels: Musicast; Low Wood
- Members: Émilie Satt (born 23 October 1986); Jean-Karl Lucas (born 22 June 1982)

Madame Monsieur is a French duo consisting of vocalist Émilie Satt and producer Jean-Karl Lucas. They represented France at the Eurovision Song Contest 2018 in Lisbon, Portugal with the song "Mercy", finishing in 13th place in the grand final.

== History ==
Émilie Satt (Émilie Sattonet) and Jean-Karl Lucas first met in 2008, and formed Madame Monsieur in 2013. In 2015, they composed the song "Smile" for the French rapper Youssoupha, and later participated in Taratata. The duo released their debut album Tandem on 27 June 2020.

On 1 January 2018, they were confirmed to be taking part in Destination Eurovision, the French national selection for the Eurovision Song Contest 2018 with the song "Mercy". They qualified from the second semi-final on 20 January to the final held on 27 January. In the final, they placed third with the international juries and first with the French public, amassing enough combined points to win the competition. They represented France in the Eurovision Song Contest 2018 held in Lisbon, Portugal, ultimately coming in thirteenth place. As well as receiving the Marcel Bezençon Press Award, they were also the runner-up of the OGAE fan vote, just behind actual winner Netta Barzilai of Israel.

In 2018, they provided French commentary for France 2 at that year's Junior Eurovision Song Contest alongside Stéphane Bern. In 2019, they co-wrote the song Roi alongside Bilal Hassani. The song represented France at the Eurovision Song Contest 2019 in Tel Aviv, Israel finishing in 16th place.

== Musical style ==
The group's musical style has been likened by The Huffington Post to avant-pop singer-songwriter Christine and The Queens.

== Members ==
- Émilie Satt — lead vocals
- Jean-Karl Lucas — production, backing vocals

== Discography ==
=== Albums ===
Title	Details	Peak chart positions		Sales
Title	Details	FRA	BEL (Wa)	Sales
Vu d'ici	Released: 20 April 2018; Label: Low Wood, Musicast; Format: Digital download, CD	39	60	FR: 1,700
Tandem	Released: 26 June 2020; Label: Low Wood; Format: Digital download, CD	154	—	
"—" denotes an album that did not chart or was not released.

=== Singles ===
Title	Year	Peak chart positions				Album
Title	Year	FRA	BEL (Fl) Tip	BEL (Wa)	SWE	Album
"You Make Me Smile"	2015	—	—	—	—	Tandem (EP)
"Égérie"	2016	—	—	—	—	Tandem (EP)
"See Ya" (featuring S.Pri Noir)	2016	—	—	—	—	Tandem (EP)
"Morts ou vifs" (featuring Jok'Air and Ibrahim Maalouf)	2016	—	—	—	—	Tandem (EP)
"Partir"	2016	—	—	—	—	Tandem (EP)
"Tournera" (featuring Youssoupha)	2016	—	—	—	—	Tandem (EP)
"Mercy"	2018	29	36	10	90	Vu d'ici
"Comme une reine"	2018	—	—	—	—	Vu d'ici
"Les lois de l'attraction" (featuring Kyo)	2019	—	—	—	—	Tandem
"Comme si j'avais mille ans" (featuring Kalash Criminel)	2019	—	—	—	—	Tandem
"Bandido" (with Kpoint & Greg Zlap)	2019	—	—	—	—	Tandem
"Comme un voleur" (featuring Jérémy Frérot)	2020	—	—	—	—	Tandem
"Prochain soleil"	2020	—	—	—	—	Non-album single
"Cœurs abîmés"	2021	—	—	—	—	Non-album single
"—" denotes a single that did not chart or was not released.

Preceded by Alma with "Requiem"	France in the Eurovision Song Contest; 2018	Succeeded by Bilal Hassani with "Roi"
