= San Marino in the Eurovision Song Contest 2020 =

- Eurovision Song Contest 2020
- Participating broadcaster: San Marino RTV (SMRTV)
- Country: San Marino
- Selection process: Artist: Internal selection Song: Digital Battle
- Selection date: Artist: 6 March 2020; Song: 9 March 2020

Competing entry
- Song: "Freaky!"
- Artist: Senhit
- Songwriters: Gianluigi Fazio; Henrik Steen Hansen; Nanna Bottos

Placement
- Final result: Contest cancelled

Participation chronology

San Marino was set to be represented at the Eurovision Song Contest 2020, which was scheduled to be held in Rotterdam, Netherlands. Italian singer Senhit was chosen to represent the nation with her song "Freaky!". Sammarinese broadcaster San Marino RTV (SMRTV) internally selected the singer, while her song was selected through a national final entitled Digital Battle. Senhit previously represented San Marino in the 2011 contest, but failed to qualify for the final. Due to the COVID-19 pandemic in Europe during 2020, the Eurovision Song Contest was cancelled in mid-March 2020. "Freaky!" was subsequently an entry for several replacement events including Eurovision: Europe Shine a Light, Der kleine Song Contest and Sveriges 12:a. Senhit announced during the former of the three that she would return to represent the nation at the 2021 contest the following year.

== Background ==
Prior to the 2020 contest, San Marino had participated in the Eurovision Song Contest 10 times since their first entry in 2008. The nation's debut entry in the 2008 contest, "Complice" performed by Miodio, failed to qualify for the final and placed last in the semi-final it competed in. San Marino subsequently did not participate in both the 2009 and 2010 contests, citing financial difficulties. They returned in 2011 with Italian singer Senit performing "Stand By", which also failed to take the nation to the final. From 2012 to 2014, San Marino sent Valentina Monetta to the contest on three consecutive occasions, which made her the first singer to participate in three consecutive contests since Udo Jürgens, who competed in 1964, 1965 and 1966 for Austria. Monetta's entries in 2012 ("The Social Network Song") and 2013 ("Crisalide (Vola)") also failed to qualify San Marino to the final, however in 2014, she managed to bring the nation to the final for the first time with "Maybe", placing 24th. The nation's next four entries, "Chain of Lights" performed by Anita Simoncini and Michele Perniola for 2015, "I Didn't Know" by Serhat for 2016, "Spirit of the Night" by Monetta and Jimmie Wilson for 2017 and "Who We Are" by Jessika featuring Jenifer Brening for 2018, did not qualify for the final. San Marino's best placing up to 2020 was in the previous year's contest where Serhat appeared for his second participation and finished in 19th place in the final, singing "Say Na Na Na". San Marino RTV (SMRTV) Director General Carlo Romeo confirmed San Marino's participation in the Eurovision Song Contest 2020 on 25 May 2019, a week after the conclusion of the 2019 contest.

== Before Eurovision ==
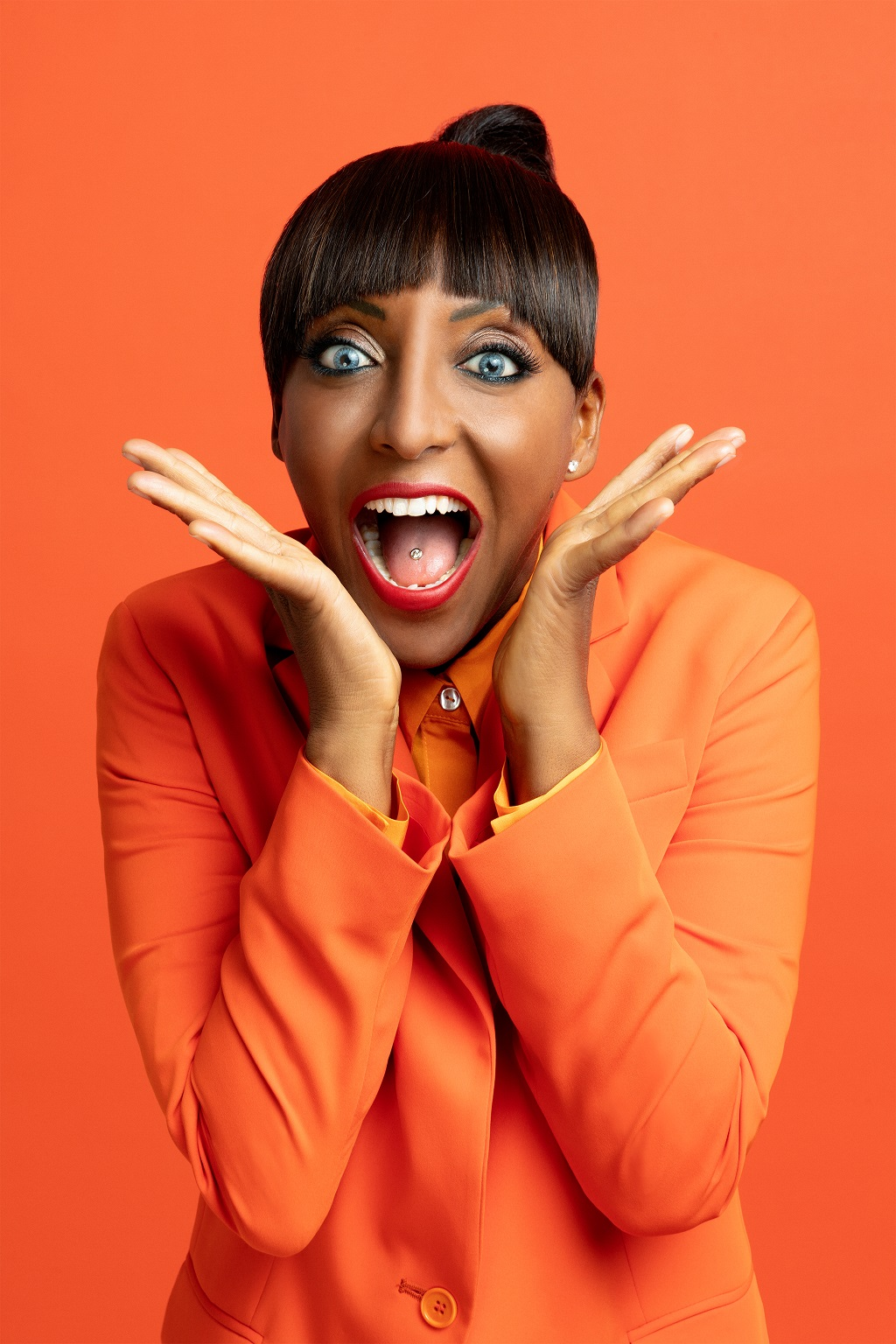
Senhit was internally selected by SMRTV to represent San Marino in the Eurovision Song Contest 2020.

=== Digital Battle ===
On 6 March 2020, SMRTV announced that they had internally selected Senhit once again to represent San Marino in the Eurovision Song Contest 2020. Senhit previously represented San Marino in the Eurovision Song Contest 2011 under the pseudonym Senit, placing 16th in the first semi-final with the song "Stand By", failing to qualify for the final. Sammarinese Head of Delegation Alessandro Capicchioni cited the success of her single "Dark Room" as the impetus behind his decision to bring her back to the contest. To select her song for 2020, it was announced that an online contest entitled Digital Battle would be organised where the public would vote for the song.

Two candidate songs produced by Gianluigi Fazio took part in Digital Battle: "Freaky!" and "Obsessed". "Freaky!", co-written by Danish songwriters Henrik Steen Hansen and Nanna Bottos, was described by Cristian Scarpone of Wiwibloggs as being a fun disco track following in the tradition of San Marino's recent disco entries from Serhat, as well as Valentina Monetta and Jimmy Wilson. "Obsessed" is a revamped English-language production of Senhit's single "Un bel niente" (2019) with additional songwriting credits for Charli Taft and Olivier Nordh. Both songs were described by the media as being electropop. Voting was made available through Senhit's official website between 7 and 8 March 2020 and the winning song, "Freaky!", was announced on 9 March 2020. SMRTV reported that the event received 31,846 votes from over 200,000 unique visitors to the website during the voting period. "Freaky!" received 16,433 votes (52%), while "Obsessed" received 15,413 votes (48%). Luca Tommassini, who directed the music video for "Dark Room", served as artistic director for the nation's preparations for the 2020 contest.

== At Eurovision ==
The Eurovision Song Contest 2020 was originally scheduled to take place at Rotterdam Ahoy in Rotterdam, Netherlands and consist of two semi-finals on 12 and 14 May, respectively, and a final on 16 May 2020. All nations with the exceptions of the host country and the "Big Five", consisting of France, Germany, Italy, Spain and the United Kingdom, would have been required to qualify from one of two semi-finals in order to compete for the final; the top 10 countries from each semi-final would have progressed to the final. On 28 January 2020, the allocation draw was held at Rotterdam City Hall, placing San Marino into the first half of the second semi-final. However, due to the COVID-19 pandemic in Europe, the contest was cancelled on 18 March 2020. The European Broadcasting Union (EBU) announced soon after that entries intended for 2020 would not be eligible for the following year, though each broadcaster would be able to send either their 2020 representative or a new one. During the replacement event Eurovision: Europe Shine a Light, which showcased the entries that were set to take part in the contest, Senhit announced that she would return to represent the nation at the Eurovision Song Contest 2021.

=== Alternative song contests ===
Some of the broadcasters scheduled to take part in the Eurovision Song Contest 2020 organised alternative competitions. Austria's ORF broadcast Der kleine Song Contest in April 2020, which saw every entry being assigned to one of three semi-finals. A jury consisting of 10 singers that had represented Austria in the Eurovision Song Contest were tasked with ranking each song; the best-placed entry in each semi-final advanced to the final round. In the first semi-final on 14 April 2020, San Marino placed 13th in a field of 14 participants, achieving 35 points. San Marino's song also partook in Sveriges Television's Sveriges 12:a in May, though it failed to qualify for the final round.
