= San Marino in the Eurovision Song Contest 2012 =

- Eurovision Song Contest 2012
- Participating broadcaster: San Marino RTV (SMRTV)
- Country: San Marino
- Selection process: Internal selection
- Announcement date: Artist: 14 March 2012; Song: 22 March 2012

Competing entry
- Song: "The Social Network Song"
- Artist: Valentina Monetta
- Songwriters: Ralph Siegel; Jose Santana Rodriguez; Timothy Touchton

Placement
- Semi-final result: Failed to qualify (14th)

Participation chronology

San Marino was represented at the Eurovision Song Contest 2012, held in Baku, Azerbaijan. The Sammarinese national broadcaster San Marino RTV (SMRTV) internally selected Valentina Monetta with "The Social Network Song" to represent the nation in the contest. SMRTV had initially proposed a different version of the song, titled "Facebook Uh, Oh, Oh", but was instructed to modify or replace the entry due to concerns relating to commercial messaging. The entry was promoted through the creation of a music video, a promotional tour throughout Europe and interviews with the press in the lead up to the Eurovision Song Contest 2012. San Marino performed 11th in the first semi-final, held on 22 May 2012, and placed 14th, receiving 31 points and failing to qualify for the grand final. This marked their best placing in the contest to this point.

== Background ==
Prior to the 2012 contest, San Marino had participated in the Eurovision Song Contest twice since their debut at the 2008 contest. For both of these appearances, San Marino RTV (SMRTV) hosted internal selection processes, choosing the band Miodio with the song "Complice" for 2008 and Senit with the song "Stand By" for 2011. Both songs competed in the semi-finals of their contests, but failed to qualify for the respective grand finals. To this point, the nation's best placing at the contest was 16th in the semi-finals, which they achieved in the previous year's contest. San Marino did not compete in the 2009 or 2010 contests, citing financial difficulties.

== Before Eurovision ==
=== Internal selection ===
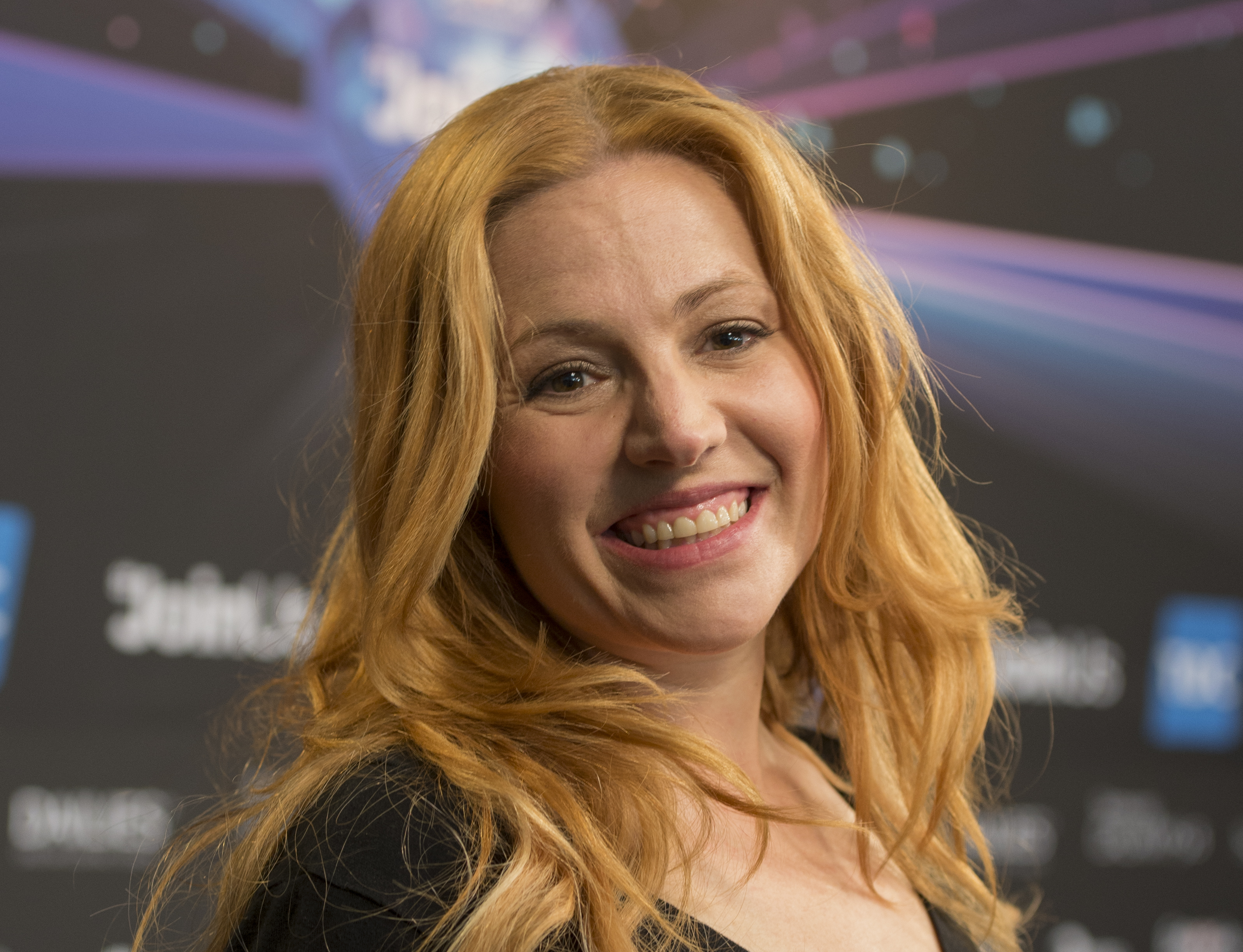
Valentina Monetta was internally selected by SMRTV to represent San Marino in the Eurovision Song Contest 2012.

On 14 March 2012, SMRTV held a press conference where they announced that they had internally selected singer Valentina Monetta to represent San Marino at the Eurovision Song Contest 2012. Monetta was selected to represent San Marino after being scouted by an SMRTV director by chance when he viewed her performing one night.

A special presentation programme to reveal Monetta's song was held on 16 March 2012 at the broadcaster's studio, hosted by Carmen Lasorella and broadcast on SMRTV as well as online via the broadcaster's website smtvsanmarino.sm and the official Eurovision Song Contest website eurovision.tv. At the programme, "Facebook Uh, Oh, Oh" was presented as the song to represent San Marino in the Eurovision Song Contest 2012. The song was composed by Ralph Siegel with lyrics by Jose Santana Rodriguez and Timothy Touchton. Siegel had previously composed 20 Eurovision entries for various countries. In regards to the song, Siegel stated that "Facebook Uh, Oh, Oh" was written specifically for the Eurovision Song Contest but not for Monetta.

=== Song changes ===
Two days after the song's presentation on 18 March 2012, the reference group in charge of enforcing the rules of the contest determined that the entry was ineligible to participate as the inclusion of a reference to the social network site Facebook breached the Eurovision Song Contest's rule barring commercial messaging. Prior to submitting the song, SMRTV had consulted with their attorneys and believed that they could use the name because it was in a satirical, not commercial nature. Facing potential disqualification, SMRTV was allowed by the European Broadcasting Union (EBU) to either modify the lyrics of the song or select an alternative no later than 23 March 2012. The broadcaster opted to revise their entry, with the new version entitled "The Social Network Song" released on 22 March. In response to the change, Siegel stated that it was not easy to accommodate the directive, as they had to record the song again, make a new edit of the music video and redo much of the promotional material in a very short amount of time.

=== Promotion ===
To promote the entry, a music video for "The Social Network Song" was filmed. The broadcaster also hosted a contest where people could create their own music videos of the song and upload them to YouTube to win a cash prize and a weekend trip to Munich, Germany.

In mid April 2012, Monetta started a promotional tour in Belgium, where she was a guest on the show Studio TVL and was interviewed by newspaper Dag Allemaal. In late April, Monetta was one of several participants of 2012 who took part in the annual Eurovision in Concert series, an event held at club Melkweg in Amsterdam, Netherlands staged to serve as a preview party for the year's entries. Her tour continued with visits to London and Tel Aviv, and an appearance in a programme titled Tribute to Eurovision in Jerusalem. These were followed in early May 2012 with an interview in Athens on Greece's Star Channel, as well as appearances on local media in Baku during the week of the contest.

== At Eurovision ==
The Eurovision Song Contest 2012 took place at the Baku Crystal Hall in Baku, Azerbaijan. It consisted of two semi-finals held on 22 and 24 May, respectively, and the grand final on 26 May 2012. Lia Fiorio and Gigi Restivo served as commentators for the television and radio broadcasts, which were also streamed online. According to the Eurovision rules, all participating countries, except the host nation and the "Big Five", consisting of France, Germany, Italy, Spain and the United Kingdom, were required to qualify from one of the two semi-finals to compete for the grand final; the top 10 countries from the respective semi-finals would proceed to the final.

On 25 January 2012, an allocation draw was held at the Buta Palace in Baku that placed each country into one of the two semi-finals; San Marino was placed into the second half of the first semi-final, to be held on 22 May. Once all the competing songs for the Eurovision Song Contest 2012 had been released, the running order for the semi-finals was decided by another draw, which was held on 20 March. The nation was assigned to perform at position 11, following Israel and preceding Cyprus.

Monetta performed "The Social Network Song" in the first semi-final on 22 May 2012, appearing 11th out of the 18 countries. Surrounded by five backing artists performing while wearing costumes representing several professions, Monetta appeared in a blue leather outfit with a silver blouse and shoes. A laptop computer was placed on a stand and the LED screens that surrounded the ensemble featured thousands of people's faces amongst speech bubbles reading "uh" and "oh". Jacqueline Duell was the choreographer for the performance.

=== Voting ===
Below is a breakdown of points awarded to San Marino in the first semi-final of the Eurovision Song Contest 2012, as well as by the country in the semi-final and grand final, respectively. In the first semi-final, San Marino did not qualify for the grand final, placing 14th with 31 points: the nation was awarded 13th place with 25 points by the public and 14th place with 42 points by the jury. This placement marked the San Marino's highest placing in the contest to this point. Monica Fabbri was the Sammarinese spokesperson who announced the country's voting results.

==== Points awarded to San Marino ====
Points awarded to San Marino (Semi-final 1)
Score	Country
12 points	
10 points	Albania
8 points	
7 points	Moldova
6 points	
5 points	Azerbaijan
4 points	Montenegro
3 points	Italy
2 points	Greece
1 point	

==== Points awarded by San Marino ====
Points awarded by San Marino (Semi-final 1)
Score	Country
12 points	Ireland
10 points	Albania
8 points	Montenegro
7 points	Greece
6 points	Romania
5 points	Moldova
4 points	Denmark
3 points	Iceland
2 points	Russia
1 points	Switzerland

Points awarded by San Marino (Final)
Score	Country
12 points	Albania
10 points	Russia
8 points	Moldova
7 points	Italy
6 points	Serbia
5 points	Turkey
4 points	Azerbaijan
3 points	Sweden
2 points	Malta
1 points	Spain
