= San Marino in the Eurovision Song Contest 2013 =

- Eurovision Song Contest 2013
- Participating broadcaster: San Marino RTV (SMRTV)
- Country: San Marino
- Selection process: Internal selection
- Announcement date: 30 January 2013

Competing entry
- Song: "Crisalide (Vola)"
- Artist: Valentina Monetta
- Songwriters: Ralph Siegel; Mauro Balestri

Placement
- Semi-final result: Failed to qualify (11th)

Participation chronology

San Marino was represented at the Eurovision Song Contest 2013, held in Malmö, Sweden. The Sammarinese national broadcaster San Marino RTV (SMRTV) internally selected Valentina Monetta with "Crisalide (Vola)" to represent the nation in the contest. Monetta had previously represented San Marino at the 2012 contest, placing 14th in the semi-finals. The 2013 entry was promoted through the creation of a music video, a promotional tour that included stops in London and Amsterdam, and interviews to the press in the lead up to the Eurovision Song Contest 2013. San Marino performed second in the second semi-final, held on 16 May 2013, and placed 11th, receiving 47 points and failing to qualify for the grand final. However, this marked the nation's best placing to this point.

== Background ==
Prior to the 2013 contest, San Marino had participated in the Eurovision Song Contest three times since their debut at the 2008 contest. For all of these appearances, San Marino RTV (SMRTV) hosted internal selection processes, choosing the band Miodio with the song "Complice" for 2008, Senit with "Stand By" for 2011, and Valentina Monetta with "The Social Network Song" for 2012. All competed in the semi-finals of their contests, but failed to qualify for the respective grand finals. To this point, the nation's best placing in the contest was 14th in the semi-finals, which they achieved in the previous year's contest. San Marino did not compete in the 2009 or 2010 contests, citing financial difficulties. On 21 December 2012, San Marino was included on the list of countries that had signed up to take part in the Eurovision Song Contest 2013.

== Before Eurovision ==
=== Internal selection ===
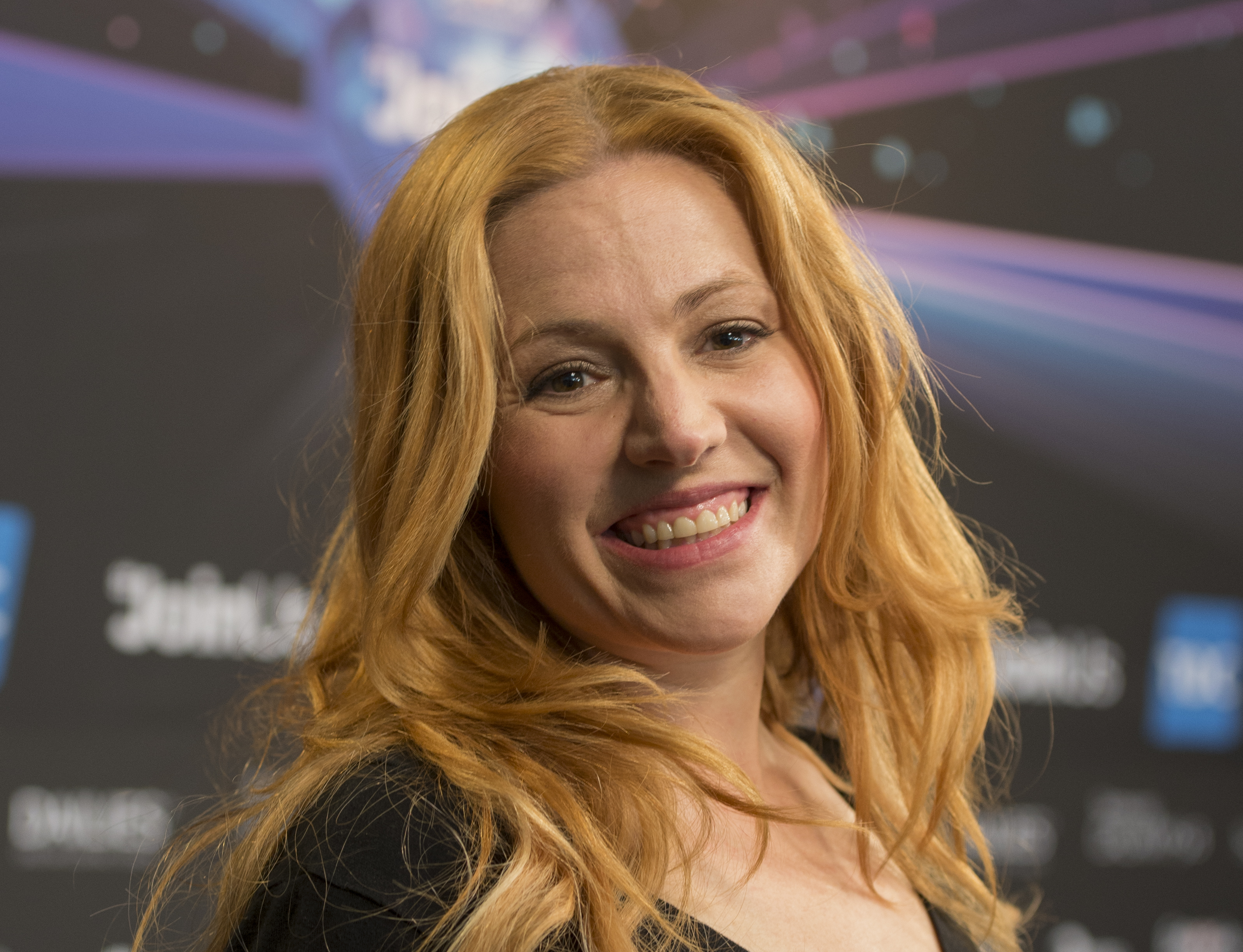
For the second year in a row, Valentina Monetta was internally selected by SMRTV to represent San Marino in the Eurovision Song Contest.

On 30 January 2013, SMRTV held a press conference at the Titano de Kursaal Hall where they announced that they had internally selected Valentina Monetta to represent San Marino at the Eurovision Song Contest 2013 for a second consecutive time with the song "Crisalide (Vola)". SMRTV Director Carlo Romeo and San Marino Head of Delegation Alessandro Capicchioni were also in attendance for the event. Monetta previously represented San Marino in the Eurovision Song Contest 2012, placing fourteenth in the first semi-final with the song "The Social Network Song". Both Monetta and the song were selected to represent San Marino by the broadcaster and a selection committee consisting of Roberto Moretti (artistic director), Roberto Monti (musician) and Massimiliano Messieri (composer, conductor and music director) after receiving proposals from artists, composers, producers and record companies. The song was composed by Ralph Siegel with lyrics by Mauro Balestri. Siegel had previously composed 21 Eurovision entries for various countries, including "The Social Network Song". In regards to the song, Siegel stated that "Crisalide (Vola)" was written specifically for Monetta unlike her previous entry, and highlights how she had grown over the past year following her first participation.

A special presentation programme to present "Crisalide (Vola)" was held on 15 March 2013 at the broadcaster's studio, broadcast on SMRTV as well as online via the broadcaster's website smtvsanmarino.sm and the official Eurovision Song Contest website eurovision.tv. Artistic director Fabrizio Raggi, committee member Roberto Moretti and the writers of the song, Siegel and Balestri, were featured as guests of the programme along with Capicchioni and Monetta. Described as a ballad with hints of dance at the end, the song was recorded by Monetta in August 2012 and was one of six songs Siegel and Monetta submitted to the broadcaster for consideration.

=== Promotion ===
To promote the entry, a music video for "Crisalide (Vola)" was filmed at SMRTV's studio and released as part of the song's presentation on 15 March 2013. Monetta staged a promotional tour, appearing in the fifth annual Eurovision in Concert series on 13 April, an event held at club Melkweg in Amsterdam, Netherlands staged to serve as a preview party for the year's entries. Nine days later, she appeared in London for the annual London Preview Party of Eurovision songs where she sang an English version of her entry, titled "Chrysallis". In the lead up to the contest, Monetta gave several interviews with local and international press in Malmö.

== At Eurovision ==
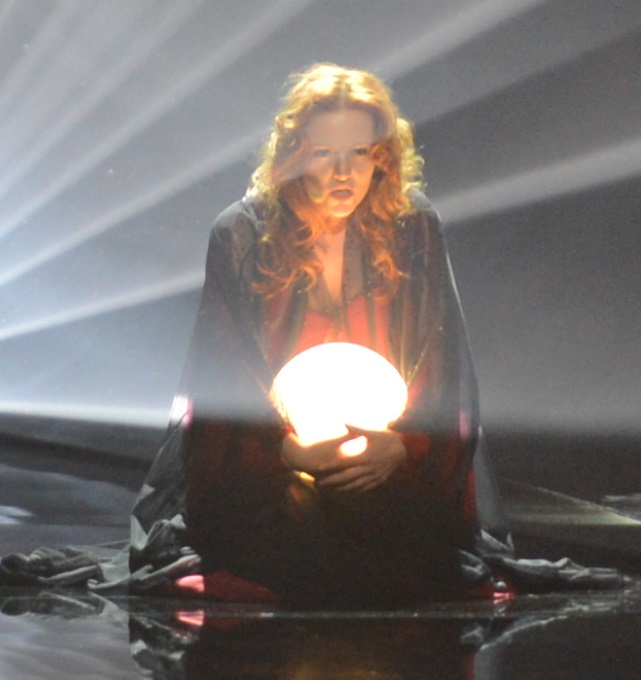
Valentina Monetta's performance of "Crisalide (Vola)" included a light orb meant to represent a chrysalis.

The Eurovision Song Contest 2013 took place at the Malmö Arena in Malmö, Sweden. It consisted of two semi-finals held on 14 and 16 May, respectively, and the grand final on 18 May 2013. Lia Fiorio and Gigi Restivo served as commentators for the television and radio broadcasts, which were also streamed online. According to the Eurovision rules, all participating countries, except the host nation and the "Big Five", consisting of France, Germany, Italy, Spain and the United Kingdom, were required to qualify from one of the two semi-finals to compete for the grand final; the top 10 countries from the respective semi-finals would proceed to the grand final.

On 17 January 2013, an allocation draw was held in Malmö that placed each country into one of the two semi-finals and identified which half of the show they would perform in, with San Marino being placed into the first half of the second semi-final. Once all of the competing songs for the Eurovision Song Contest had been released, the running order for the semi-finals was decided by the producers of the contest rather than through another draw. On 28 March 2013, the running order was published, with the nation assigned position two, following Latvia and preceding Macedonia.

Monetta performed "Crisalide (Vola)" in the second semi-final on 16 May 2013, appearing second out of the 17 countries. Her performance was similar to that of the music video, with her being seen holding a light orb meant to represent a chrysalis which transforms into a butterfly. The choreography was arranged by Fabrizio Raggi, who served as art director for the year's participation.

=== Voting ===
Below is a breakdown of points awarded to San Marino in the second semi-final of the Eurovision Song Contest 2013, as well as by the country in the semi-final and grand final. In the second semi-final, San Marino did not qualify for the grand final, placing 11th with 47 points. This placement marked the nation's highest placing to this point. Based on points received, SMRTV equated this placing to a hypothetical 27th place overall in the contest. The national vote in the second semi-final and the grand final was cast by a jury consisting of Messieri, Fabio Guidi, Viola Conti, Monica Moroni and Boris Casadei. John Kennedy O'Connor was the Sammarinese spokesperson who announced the country's voting results.

==== Points awarded to San Marino ====
Points awarded to San Marino (Semi-final 2)
Score	Country
12 points	
10 points	Spain
8 points	
7 points	
6 points	Malta
5 points	France; Macedonia
4 points	Armenia; Israel; Romania
3 points	Latvia
2 points	Hungary
1 point	Azerbaijan; Finland; Georgia; Greece

==== Points awarded by San Marino ====
Jury Points awarded by San Marino (Semi-final 2)
Score	Country
12 points	Greece
10 points	Malta
8 points	Bulgaria
7 points	Finland
6 points	Albania
5 points	Norway
4 points	Hungary
3 points	Azerbaijan
2 points	Macedonia
1 point	Georgia

Jury Points awarded by San Marino (Final)
Score	Country
12 points	Greece
10 points	Malta
8 points	France
7 points	Norway
6 points	Hungary
5 points	Belgium
4 points	Italy
3 points	Finland
2 points	Azerbaijan
1 point	Armenia
