= Valentina Monetta =

Sammarinese singer (born 1975)

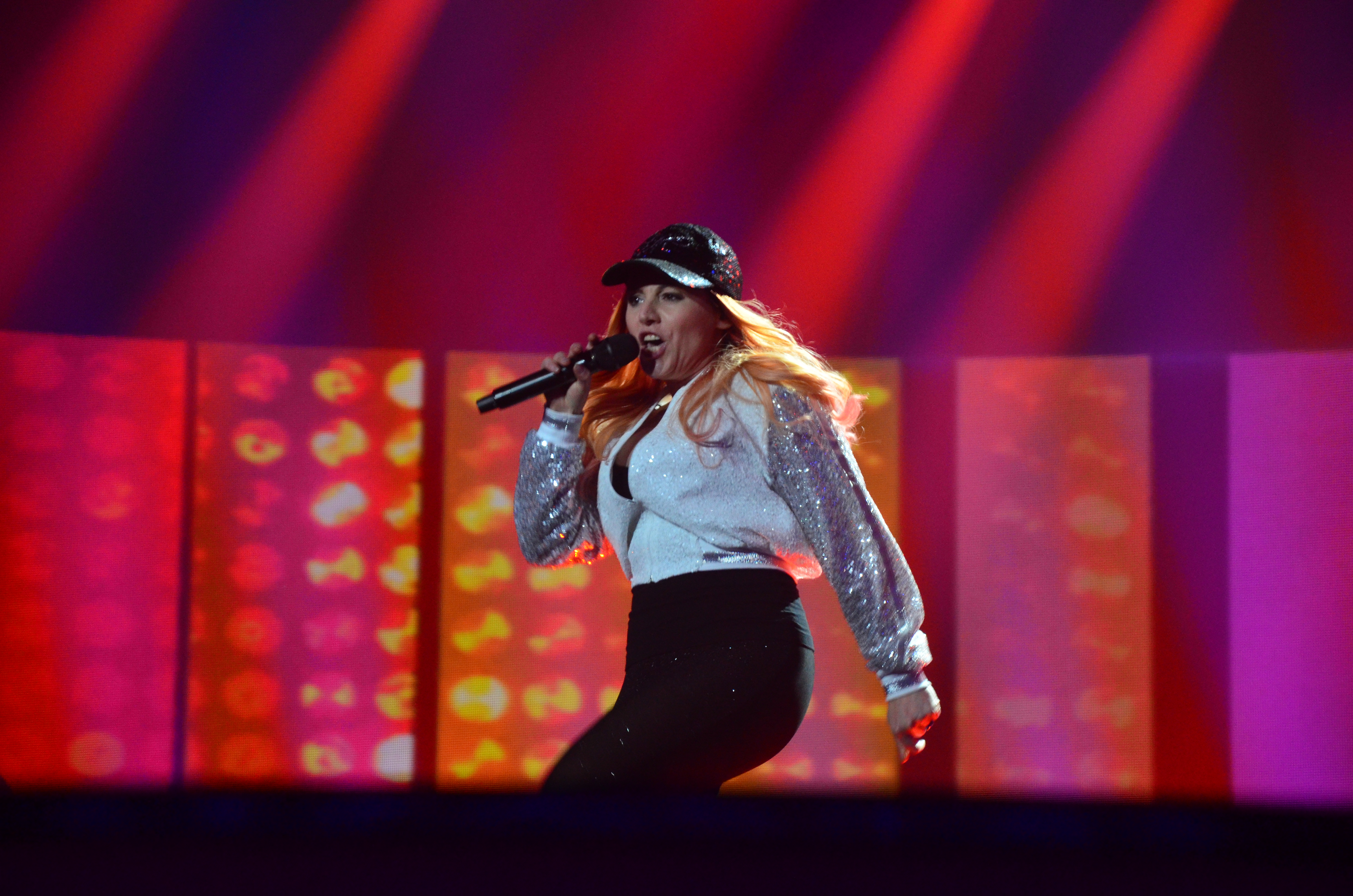
- Monetta performing at the Eurovision Song Contest 2017

Background information
- Born: 1 March 1975 (age 51); City of San Marino, San Marino
- Genres: Jazz; pop
- Occupation: Singer
- Years active: 1995–present
- Label: Jupiter Records
- Spouse: Sbura King-Siso (m. 2023)

Valentina Monetta (born 1 March 1975) is a Sammarinese and Italian singer. She is best known for representing San Marino in the Eurovision Song Contest in 2012, 2013, 2014, and 2017. In the 2014 contest, Monetta became the first entrant to qualify for the final for San Marino.

== Early life and education ==
Valentina Monetta was born on 1 March 1975 in San Marino, to an Italian father and a Sammarinese mother. She is the youngest of two children. She studied piano and singing from an early age, and graduated from the Giovanni da Rimini school in Rimini, Italy.

She later studied at the Accademia di Belle Arti di Bologna for two years, and completed a three-year jazz singing course at the Conservatorio di Musica Arturo Toscanini under the supervision of Martina Grossi.

== Career ==
=== 1995–2011: Career beginnings ===
She began her singing career in 1995 fronting the group Tiberio, and was subsequently involved with a number of bands including Parafunky, Harem-B, and My Funky Valentine. She competed in the 2001 edition of the televised singing competition Popstar. In 2006, she participated in the discography project 2black, releasing the single "Vai" with Papa Winnie.

In 2008, Monetta submitted the song "Se Non Ci Sei Tu" for the inaugural Sammarinese national selection for the Eurovision Song Contest 2008, but was not selected to represent the country. In 2011, she released her first EP, Il mio gioco perferito, as part of the band My Funky Valentine.

=== 2012–2017: Eurovision Song Contest ===
On 14 March 2012, San Marino RTV announced that Monetta would represent San Marino in the Eurovision Song Contest 2012, held in Baku, Azerbaijan. Her entry, "Facebook, Uh, Oh, Oh (A Satirical Song)", was released two days later. On 18 March, the European Broadcasting Union deemed the song ineligible to compete, concluding that the song, which heavily featured the Facebook trademark, contained a commercial message that breaches contest rules. The broadcaster was given until 23 March at 12:00 CET to revise the song to remove the incriminating material, or to deliver a new song. On 22 March, the broadcaster presented a revised version of the song, titled "The Social Network Song (OH OH – Uh – OH OH)". Monetta was drawn to perform in 11th at the first semi-final, but failed to qualify to the grand final, placing 14th with a total of 31 points.

In August 2012, Monetta starred as the protagonist in the UNICEF-sponsored musical Camelia.

On 30 January 2013, it was revealed that Monetta would return to represent San Marino at the Eurovision Song Contest 2013 in Malmö, Sweden. Her entry, "Crisalide (Vola)", was released on 15 March. The song, which was composed by Ralph Siegel, was written during the summer prior and was selected by Monetta herself. Despite placing second in the annual OGAE poll, Monetta failed to advance to the grand final after competing in the second semi-final, finishing in 11th with 47 points. After the contest, she released her debut studio album, La storia di Valentina Monetta.

Monetta presenting herself during the Eurovision Song Contest 2014

Following her participation in the 2013 contest, Monetta was contacted by Carlo Romeo, Director General of San Marino RTV, to consider participating in the forthcoming 2014 contest held in Copenhagen, Denmark. After discussion with Siegel, she accepted the offer, and her participation as the Sammarinese entrant was announced later that year on 19 June. She became the first singer to participate in three consecutive contests since Udo Jürgens in 1966, and the fourth singer overall. Her competing entry, "Maybe (Forse)", was released on 14 March. Monetta performed in 12th during the first semi-final, where she qualified to the grand final, placing 10th with a total of 40 points. It marked San Marino's first qualification in the contest since their debut in 2008. She later placed 24th in the grand final with 14 points. While preparing for the contest, her second album, Sensibility, was released.

On 2 February 2015, rumours began circulating that Monetta would act as the Sammarinese spokesperson for the 2015 contest. She debunked the story, stating that she had not been approached by San Marino RTV, but was later revealed to be the Sammarinese spokesperson.

On 12 March 2017, it was announced that Monetta would once again return to represent San Marino in the Eurovision Song Contest 2017. It marked Monetta's fourth appearance at the contest, tying a record held by Elisabeth Andreassen and Sue Schell of Peter, Sue and Marc. Her competing entry, "Spirit of the Night", was performed as a duet with American singer Jimmie Wilson, and was released on the same day. The duo failed to qualify to the grand final, placing 18th in the second semi-final with 1 point.

=== 2019–present: After Eurovision ===
In 2020, she participated in the Rai 5 documentary "L'isola di San Marino". On 6 March 2021, Monetta joined Radio San Marino, where she began co-presenting Saturday Morning Live weekly alongside Federico Vespa.

On 13 February 2022, in celebration of San Marino National Day at the Expo 2020, Monetta performed at the Al Wasl Plaza at the Dubai Exhibition Centre.

== Personal life ==
In September 2023, Monetta married her long-time boyfriend Sbura King-Siso.

== Discography ==
=== Albums ===
Title	Details
Il mio gioco preferito	Released: 19 September 2011; Label: MFV; Formats: Digital download
La storia di Valentina Monetta	Released: 31 May 2013; Label: Meteor Musik; Formats: Digital download, CD
Sensibilità (Sensibility)	Released: 4 April 2014; Label: Jupiter Records; Formats: Digital download, CD

=== Extended plays ===
Title	Details
Sensibilità	Released: 4 July 2014; Label: Jupiter Records; Formats: Digital download, CD

=== Singles ===
==== As lead artist ====
Title	Year	Album
"The Social Network Song (Oh Oh-Uh-Oh-Oh)"	2012	La storia di Valentina Monetta
"Crisalide (Vola)"	2013	La storia di Valentina Monetta
"Maybe (Forse)"	2014	Sensibilità (Sensibility)
"Spirit of the Night" (with Jimmie Wilson)	2017	Non-album single

==== Promotional singles ====
Year	Title	Album
2002	"Sharp"	Non-album singles
2008	"Se Non Ci Sei Tu"	Non-album singles
2011	"Una Giornata Bellissima"	La storia di Valentina Monetta
2012	"I'll Follow the Sunshine"	La storia di Valentina Monetta
2013	"L'amore Verrà"	La storia di Valentina Monetta
2013	"A Kiss"	Sensibilità (Sensibility)
2014	"Sensibilità"	Sensibilità (Sensibility)

Awards and achievements
Preceded by Senit with "Stand By"	San Marino in the Eurovision Song Contest; 2012, 2013, 2014	Succeeded by Michele Perniola and Anita Simoncini
Preceded by Serhat with "I Didn't Know"	San Marino in the Eurovision Song Contest with Jimmie Wilson; 2017	Succeeded by Jessika feat. Jenifer Brening with "Who We Are"
