= Ralph Siegel =

German record producer and songwriter (born 1945)

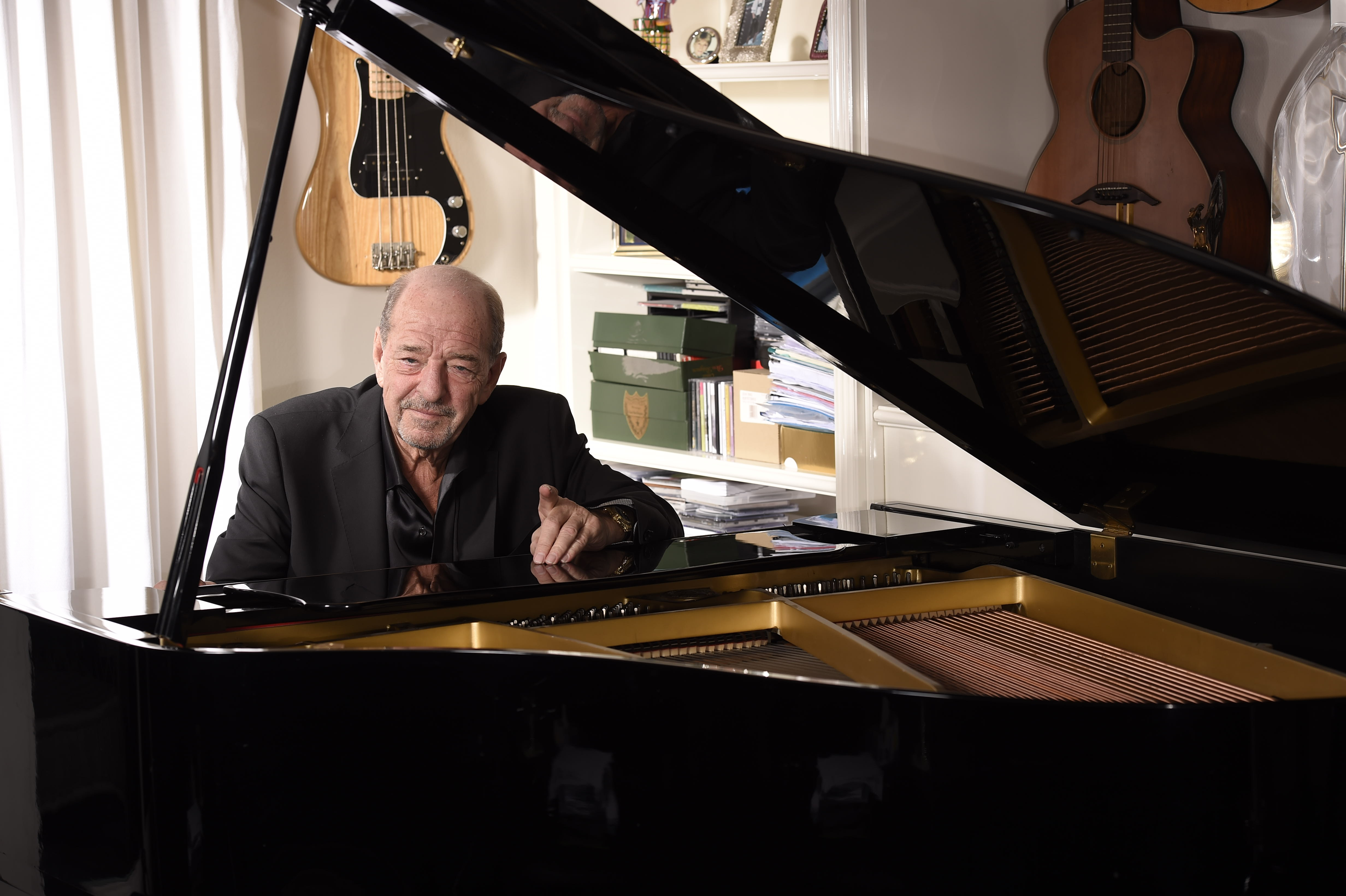

Background information
- Born: 30 September 1945 (age 81); Munich, Germany
- Genres: Schlager; disco; musical theatre
- Occupations: Producer; songwriter
- Years active: 1964–present

Ralph Siegel (born 30 September 1945) is a German record producer and songwriter. Siegel is one of the most notable figures at the Eurovision Song Contest, in which he has participated with 24 songs so far, among them the 1982 winner song "Ein bißchen Frieden".

== Background ==
Ralph Siegel was born the son of composer Ralph Maria Siegel and of singer Ingeborg Döderlein.

Siegel is a prolific producer in the German genre of Schlager music. Since the early 1970s, he worked with artists like Udo Jürgens, Mary Roos, Heino, Rex Gildo, Michael Holm, Chris Roberts, Costa Cordalis, Mireille Mathieu, Peter Alexander, Roy Black, Karel Gott and Marianne Rosenberg.

Since 1972 has participated with 24 songs in the Eurovision Song Contest, the latest being the 2017 Sammarinese entry "Spirit of the Night" by Valentina Monetta and Jimmie Wilson.

== Career ==
In 1973, Siegel set up Jupiter Records.

In 1982, Siegel's and Bernd Meinunger's song "Ein bißchen Frieden" (A Little Peace), performed by Nicole won the Contest and became a hit in Europe. In 2003, both writers had success with "Let's Get Happy", performed by Lou which came in 11th. In February 2010, it was announced by RTÉ that he would have an entry in the Irish National Final-Eurosong 2010. The song titled "River of Silence" was performed by Lee Bradshaw. It finished in last place. He also composed "C'était ma vie", performed by Lys Assia for representing Switzerland in the Eurovision Song Contest 2012. She reached an 8th position in Swiss National Final.

Siegel organized a comeback event for the Disco band Dschinghis Khan in June 2018. Dschinghis Khan had been originally organized by Siegel and Dr. Bernd Meinunger to compete in the Eurovision Song Contest 1979. After the success of their first hit, "Dschinghis Khan", both men continued to write popular songs for this band, including "Moskau" and "Hadschi Halef Omar". Siegel makes a rare appearance playing classical guitar in 1984 video footage of Dschinghis Khan performing "Corrida" and "Olé Olé".

In 2021, Siegel premiered his musical Zeppelin.

== Personal life ==
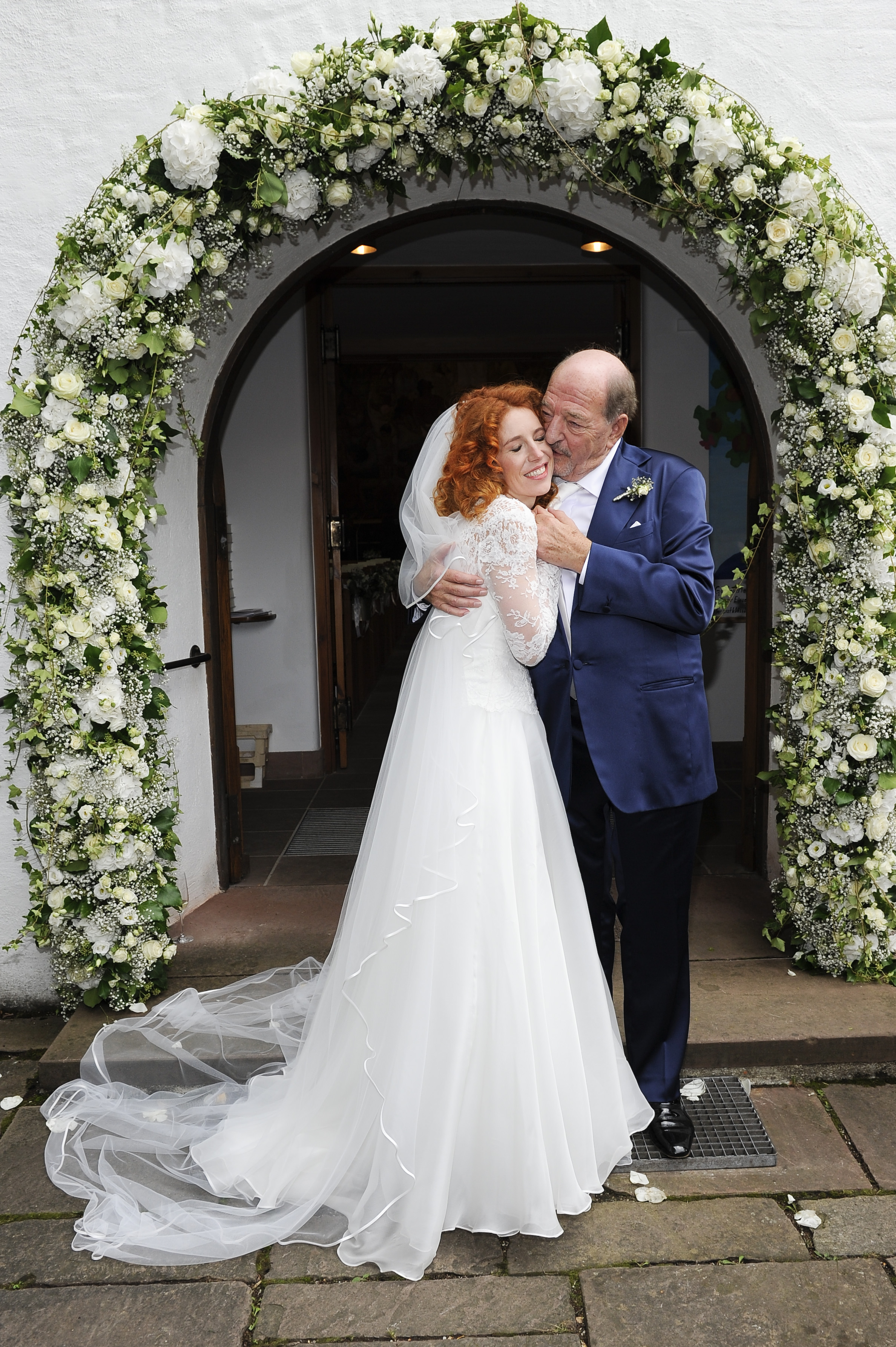
2018 Church wedding of Ralph Siegel and Laura Siegel in the Thomaskirche in Munich-Grünwald

Ralph Siegel's first marriage was to Dunja Siegel from Slovakia in 1975, with whom he had two daughters Giulia Siegel (born 1974) and Marcella Siegel (born 1976). The couple divorced in 1989.

In 1992 he married Dagmar Kögel, (née Weber). His third daughter Alana Siegel was born in 1996. The couple separated in 2002.

His third marriage to the soprano Kriemhild Siegel, (née Jahn), lasted from 2006 until the official separation in August 2014. The legal divorce then took place in 2016.

In 2015 he met the Swiss music manager Laura Käfer. After a three-year relationship, the couple got married in September 2018 in the church Grünwald near Munich. Laura Siegel brought her daughter Ruby Siegel (born 2000), (née Käfer) into the marriage.

== Eurovision Song Contest participations ==
Table key
1st	First place
2nd	Second place
3rd	Third place

Year	Country	Song	Artist	Final		Semi-Final	
Year	Country	Song	Artist	Place	Points	Place	Points
1974	Luxembourg	"Bye Bye I Love You"	Ireen Sheer	4	14	No semi-finals	
1976	Germany	"Sing Sang Song"	Les Humphries Singers	15	12	No semi-finals	
1979	Germany	"Dschinghis Khan"	Dschinghis Khan	4	86	No semi-finals	
1980	Germany	"Theater"	Katja Ebstein	2	128	No semi-finals	
1980	Luxembourg	"Papa Pingouin"	Sophie & Magaly	9	56	No semi-finals	
1981	Germany	"Johnny Blue"	Lena Valaitis	2	132	No semi-finals	
1982	Germany	"Ein bißchen Frieden"	Nicole	1	161	No semi-finals	
1985	Luxembourg	"Children, Kinder, Enfants"	Margo, Ireen Sheer, C. & M. Roberts, Olivier, Solomon	13	37	No semi-finals	
1987	Germany	"Lass die Sonne in dein Herz"	Wind	2	141	No semi-finals	
1988	Germany	"Lied für einen Freund"	Maxi & Chris Garden	14	48	No semi-finals	
1990	Germany	"Frei zu leben"	Chris Kempers and Daniel Kovac	9	60	No semi-finals	
1992	Germany	"Träume sind für alle da"	Wind	16	27	No semi-finals	
1994	Germany	"Wir geben 'ne Party"	Mekado	3	128	No semi-finals	
1997	Germany	"Zeit"	Bianca Shomburg	18	22	No semi-finals	
1999	Germany	"Reise nach Jerusalem – Kudüs'e seyahat"	Sürpriz	3	140	No semi-finals	
2002	Germany	"I Can't Live Without Music"	Corinna May	21	17	No semi-finals	
2003	Germany	"Let's Get Happy"	Lou	11	53	No semi-finals	
2006	Switzerland	"If We All Give a Little"	six4one	17	30	Pre-qualified	
2009	Montenegro	"Just Get Out of My Life"	Andrea Demirović	Failed to qualify		11	44
2012	San Marino	"The Social Network Song"	Valentina Monetta	Failed to qualify		14	31
2013	San Marino	"Crisalide (Vola)"	Valentina Monetta	Failed to qualify		11	47
2014	San Marino	"Maybe"	Valentina Monetta	24	14	10	40
2015	San Marino	"Chain of Lights"	Michele Perniola & Anita Simoncini	Failed to qualify		16	11
2017	San Marino	"Spirit of the Night"	Valentina Monetta & Jimmie Wilson	Failed to qualify		18	1

=== National final participations ===
Year	Song	Artist	Country	Position
1972	"Hallelujah Man"	Marion Maertz	Germany	5th, 12th & 6th
1972	"Mein Geschenk an dich"	Adrian Wolf	Germany	5th, 12th & 6th
1972	"Meine Liebe will ich dir geben"	Edina Pop	Germany	5th, 12th & 6th
1975	"Alles geht vorüber"	Peggy March	Germany	2nd
1975	"San Francisco Symphony"	Die Jokers	Germany	12th
1979	"Ein Blick sagt mehr als jedes Wort"	Gebrüder Blattschuß	Germany	12th
1980	"Pan"	Costa Cordalis	Germany	2nd
1981	"Mannequin"	The Hornettes	Germany	2nd
1982	"Peter Pan"	Paola	Germany	2nd
1982	"Blue-Jeans-Kinder"	Marianne Rosenberg	Germany	8th
1984	"Tingel Tangel Man"	Harmony Four	Germany	3rd
1985	"Grün Grün Grün"	Caro Pukke	Germany	4th
1985	"Die Glocken von Rom"	Heike Schäfer	Germany	2nd
1986	"Telefon"	That's Life	Germany	12th
1986	"Clowns"	Clowns	Germany	6th
1986	"Die Engel sind auch nicht mehr das was sie war'n"	Chris Heart Band	Germany	3rd
1986	"Wir gehör'n zusammen"	Dschinghis Khan	Germany	2nd
1987	"Aus"	Cassy	Germany	7th
1987	"Frieden für die Teddybären"	Maxi & Chris Garden	Germany	2nd
1988	"Tanzen geh'n"	Tammy Swift	Germany	7th
1989	"Ich hab' Angst"	Dorkas	Germany	3rd
1990	"So ein wunderschones Leben"	Waterloo	Austria	4th
1996	"Echoes"	Angela Wiedl & Dalila Cernatescu	Germany	3rd
1997	"Engel"	All About Angels	Germany	7th
1998	"Can Can"	Ballhouse	Germany	6th
1998	"Carneval"	Köpenick	Germany	7th
1998	"Kids"	Sharon Brauner	Germany	8th
2000	"I Believe in God"	Corinna May	Germany	2nd
2001	"A Song for our Friends"	German Tenors	Germany	4th
2001	"Happy Birthday Party"	Lou & Band	Germany	3rd
2003	"This Night Should Never End"	Petra Frey	Austria	2nd
2004	"It's a Wonderful Life"	Ali & Lis	Malta	5th
2005	"Time to Fall in Love Again"	Louiseann Tate	Malta	14th
2005	"Don't Stop the Party"	Ali & Lis	Malta	8th
2005	"The Angels Are Tired"	Manuel	Malta	7th
2005	"He"	Eleanor Cassar	Malta	10th
2005	"Addio, Ciao"	Aldo Busuttil	Malta	5th
2005	"Sunshine in Your Eyes"	Keith Camilleri	Malta	4th
2005	"A Miracle of Love"	Nicole Süßmilch & Marco Matias	Germany	2nd
2005	"Sometimes I Wish I Were a Child Again"	Tinka Milinović	Bosnia and Herzegovina	2nd
2009	"Innocent Heart"	Ruth Portelli	Malta	eliminated at SF4
2009	"Tonight at the Opera"	Classic Rebels	Malta	5th
2009	"Blame it on Your Heart"	Ruth Portelli	Malta	eliminated at SF5
2010	"Rivers of Silence"	Lee Bradshaw	Ireland	5th (Last)
2011	"Não estamos sós"	Emanuel Santos	Portugal	20th on online selection
2011	"I'll Follow the Sunshine"	Domenique Azzopardi	Malta	Final 24
2011	"This Is My Life"	Valeria Tarasova	Moldova	7th
2012	"C'était ma vie"	Lys Assia	Switzerland	8th
2012	"Save a Little Sunshine"	Irina Tarasiuc & MC Gootsa	Moldova	6th
2012	"Mondo blu"	Oksana Nesterenko	Ukraine	3rd
2013	"All in Your Head"	Lys Assia feat. New Jack	Switzerland	eliminated on online selection
2014	"Over the Limit"	Edona Gjinaj	Switzerland	eliminated on online selection
2016	"Under the Sun We Are One"	Laura Pinski	Germany	4th
2017	"Join Us in the Rain"	Marks & Stefanet	Moldova	4th
