= San Marino in the Eurovision Song Contest =

- Eurovision Song Contest
- Participating broadcaster: San Marino RTV (SMRTV)

Participation summary
- Appearances: 16 (4 finals)
- First appearance: 2008
- Highest placement: 19th (2019)
- Participation history: 2008; 2009; 2010; 2011; 2012; 2013; 2014; 2015; 2016; 2017; 2018; 2019; ~~2020~~; 2021; 2022; 2023; 2024; 2025; 2026
- San Marino's page at Eurovision.com
- For the most recent participation see San Marino in the Eurovision Song Contest 2026

San Marino has been represented at the Eurovision Song Contest 16 times, debuting in the 2008 contest, followed by participation from 2011 onward. The Sammarinese participating broadcaster in the contest is San Marino RTV (SMRTV). San Marino did not participate in 2009 or 2010, with SMRTV citing financial difficulties as the reason for its withdrawal. Having failed to qualify in their first four attempts, the nation qualified for the contest's final for the first time in 2014. Valentina Monetta represented San Marino in 2012, 2013, and 2014, making her the first entrant to participate in three consecutive contests since the 1960s. She also represented San Marino for a fourth time in 2017. In 2019, Serhat managed to qualify for the final, marking the second appearance of the country in a Eurovision final and achieving their best result to date of 19th place. Following the 2020 contest's cancellation due to the COVID-19 pandemic in Europe, their 2020 candidate Senhit was again selected to represent San Marino in the following contest. She qualified for the final, making it the first time that San Marino made it to two consecutive finals. In 2025, Gabry Ponte qualified San Marino for its fourth final.

SMRTV has largely chosen to select its entrant internally, though on six occasions it used national finals: 1in360 for 2018, Digital Battle for 2020, Una voce per San Marino from 2022 to 2025, and San Marino Song Contest since 2025. Unlike other participating countries, San Marino does not organise a televote due to its use of Italy's phone network and because the small number of potential televoters would not meet the minimum voting threshold set by the European Broadcasting Union (EBU).

== Participation ==
Participation in the Eurovision Song Contest is open to members of the European Broadcasting Union (EBU), of which San Marino RTV (SMRTV) has been a member since 1995. On 11 November 2007, an email from an SMRTV representative to the OGAE Italy stated that they were considering entering the Eurovision Song Contest for the first time in 2008, pending approval by their board members. A decision would have to be made by 15 November, the deadline for interested broadcasters to submit an application for participation in the 2008 contest. At the time, half of the financing of SMRTV was by Radiotelevisione Italiana (RAI), the broadcaster of Italy, which had last participated in 1997; the two entities also shared board members. Despite this, SMRTV received approval to take part and officially announced their participation on 21 November 2007. SMRTV Head of Delegation Alessandro Capicchioni stated that San Marino's motivation for entering the contest was to promote tourism and to bring attention to the nation, as "[a] lot of the world knows neither where San Marino is nor if it even exists".

== History ==
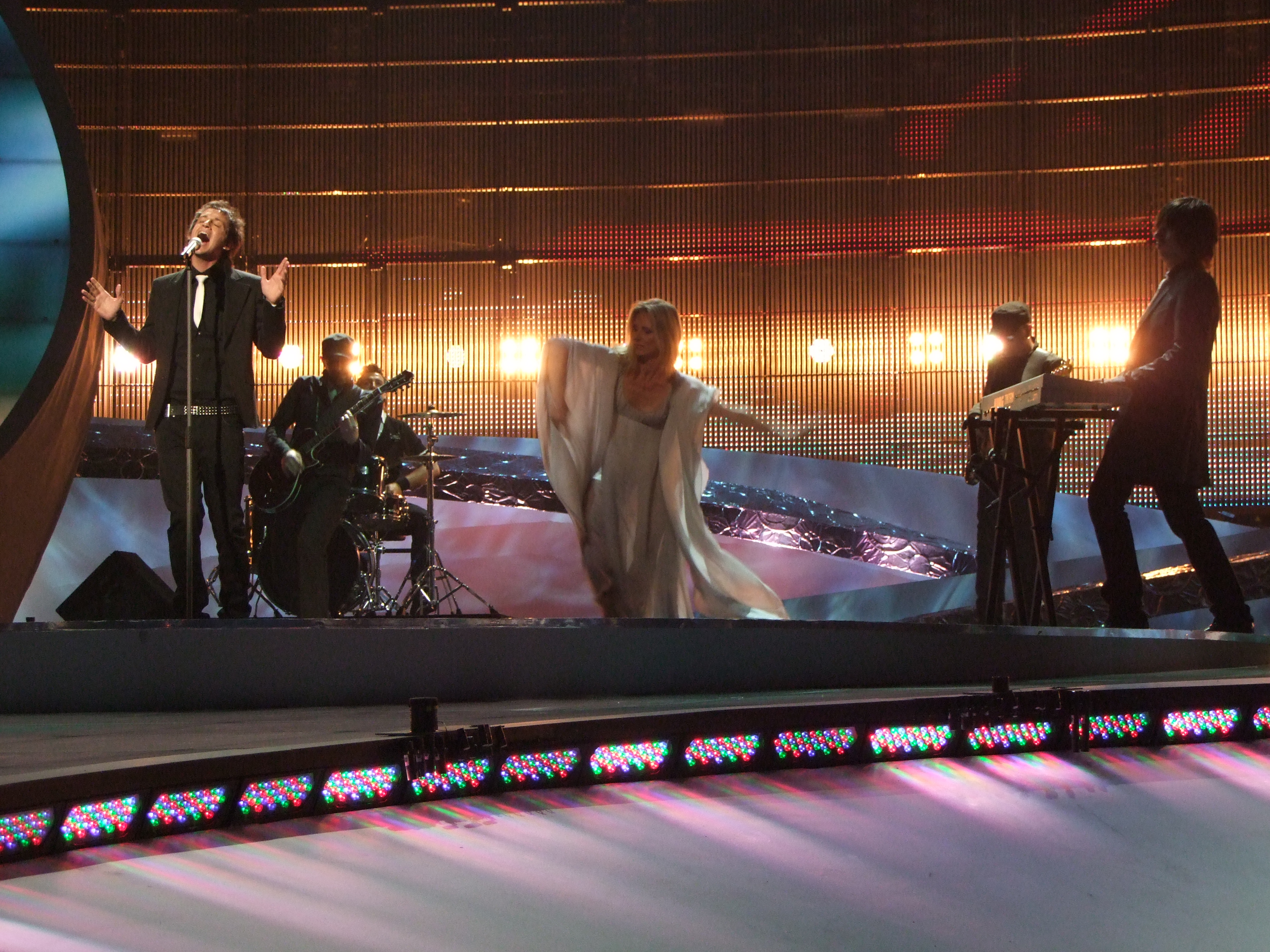
Miodio performing "Complice" in the first semi-final of the 2008 contest.

For their first Eurovision appearance, SMRTV sought to host an internal selection process, choosing Miodio with the Italian-language song "Complice". The nation's first entry did not fare well, placing last in the first semi-final, receiving just five points in total and not qualifying for the final. In June 2008, the Sammarinese Minister of Culture announced that they had good hopes to return to the next year's edition. After initially applying to take part in the 2009 contest in Moscow, Russia, SMRTV ultimately opted to not return, citing financial difficulties. San Marino did not return for the 2010 contest either, again stating financial reasons as preventing participation. Had they obtained state or private funding for an entry, SMRTV had agreed to send the Italian duo Paola e Chiara to the contest held in Oslo, Norway, that year.

After a two-year absence from the contest, San Marino returned in 2011 with Italian singer Senit performing "Stand By", which failed to take the nation to the final. From 2012 to 2014, the nation sent Valentina Monetta to the contest on three consecutive occasions, which made her the first singer to participate in three consecutive contests since Udo Jürgens, who competed in 1964, 1965 and 1966 for Austria. Monetta's entries in 2012 ("The Social Network Song") and 2013 ("Crisalide (Vola)") respectively failed to qualify San Marino for the final. However, in 2014, Monetta managed to bring the nation to the final for the first time, where she placed 24th with the song "Maybe".

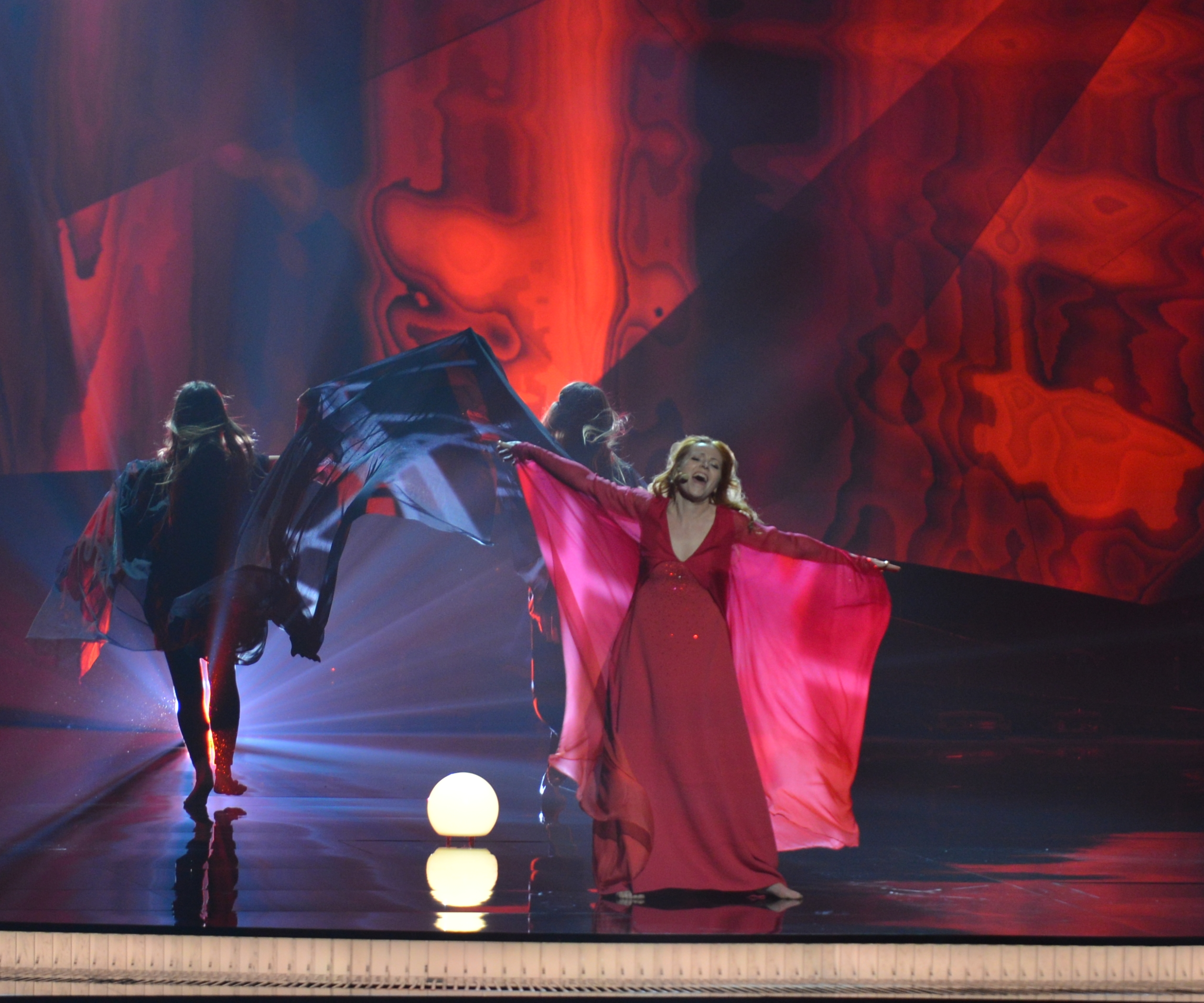
Four time entrant Valentina Monetta performing in the 2013 contest in Malmö.

San Marino's subsequent three entries: "Chain of Lights" performed by Anita Simoncini and Michele Perniola (2015), "I Didn't Know" by Turkish performer Serhat (2016) and "Spirit of the Night" by Jimmie Wilson and Monetta (2017), all failed to qualify to the final. The 2017 entry marked Monetta's fourth appearance at the contest as well as the nation's second last place finish in the semi-final. This was only slightly improved upon in 2018 with Jessika and Jenifer Brening's second to last place finish with "Who We Are". In 2019, San Marino sent Serhat for a second time, with the song "Say Na Na Na", finishing in 19th place with 77 points, giving them their best result to this point. The nation planned to take part in the 2020 contest with Senhit and her song "Freaky!", however, due to the COVID-19 pandemic in Europe, the contest was cancelled on 18 March 2020. The EBU announced soon after that entries intended for 2020 would not be eligible for the following year, though each broadcaster would be able to send either their 2020 representative or a new one. Senhit later revealed that she would return to represent San Marino for the Eurovision Song Contest 2021. Her 2021 entry "Adrenalina" featuring Flo Rida managed to qualify the nation to the final the third time in its history, eventually placing 22nd of the 26 finalists with 50 points.

San Marino's three subsequent entries failed to qualify for the final. The 2022 entry "Stripper" by Italian singer Achille Lauro finished 14th in the semi-final, the 2023 entry "Like an Animal" by Italian band Piqued Jacks finished last in its semi-final with no points, making it the first entry from San Marino to finish with nul points, and the 2024 entry "11:11" by Spanish alternative rock band Megara finished 14th in the semi-final. This streak was broken in 2025, when Italian producer Gabry Ponte with "Tutta l'Italia" qualified San Marino to the final for the fourth time, where it eventually finished 26th (last) with 27 points, The non qualification streak returned in 2026 after Senhit and Boy George failed to qualify with "Superstar".

=== Selection process ===
Una voce per San Marino logo

Prior to the 2018 contest, SMRTV had selected their Eurovision Song Contest entry internally for all of their appearances in the contest. Their first experience with a national final type process came in 2018 where SMRTV opted to organise the online talent show 1in360 to select the entry. After a brief return to an internal selection for 2019, the 2020 contest saw the nation's entry selected through Digital Battle. As part of that process, 2011 entrant Senhit was selected internally, while her song was selected through an online poll. For 2021, SMRTV continued their cooperation with Senhit, returning to an internal selection for the year's contest. The 2022 contest saw SMRTV opting to organise a singing competition entitled Una voce per San Marino to select their entry, returning a public process for a third time. Following the success of the first edition, the Sammarinese Secretary of State for Tourism, Postal Services, Economic Cooperation and the World Expo Federico Pedini Amati announced that the format had been confirmed for 2023. In August 2023, Amati confirmed that a third edition was planned to select the nation's 2024 entry, and the following October, the selection was confirmed until 2025.

=== Voting ===
Voting at the Eurovision Song Contest typically consists of 50 percent public televoting and 50 percent jury deliberation. From 2009 to 2015, the jury and public votes were combined and presented as one. San Marino does not organise a televote, however, due to their use of Italy's phone network, and because the small number of potential televoters would not meet the minimum voting threshold set by the EBU. As such, the Sammarinese vote was based solely on their jury during these contests. For the 2016 contest, the EBU introduced a new voting system where the jury and televoting points would be presented separately. If no televote was available, they would instead simulate a composite score using average televoting results from an undisclosed pre-selected group of countries. SMRTV objected to this format, particularly because the EBU would not divulge which countries they would use to create the result and because half of San Marino's points would be determined by others. For the 2017 contest, SMRTV proposed to enable televoting by Sammarinese residents through the use of a statistically representative panel of viewers, similar to the process used at the time in Italy's Sanremo Music Festival. The panel would watch the shows of the contest live and vote during the normal televoting period; their vote would then be used as the country's televote. If any issues arose, the old format could be used as a backup. However, the EBU denied this request in March 2017, and the rules had since remained unchanged in this regard.

At the 2022 contest, San Marino's jury vote was found to have irregular voting patterns during the second semi-final, along with five other nations. Consequently, these countries were given substitute aggregated jury scores for both the second semi-final and the final, calculated from the corresponding jury scores of countries with historically similar voting patterns as determined by the pots for the semi-final allocation draw for that contest. Their televoting scores were unaffected. The Flemish broadcaster VRT later reported that the juries involved had made agreements to vote for each other's entries to secure qualification to the final.

For the 2023 contest, the voting system underwent several changes, including a return of full televoting to determine the qualifiers from the semi-finals. In the event that a country cannot deliver a televoting result in a semi-final, a backup jury result would be used. This change allowed for the Sammarinese vote in the semi-finals to be based solely on its jury, however, the procedure of using calculated scores would still be used in the event that the Sammarinese jury is disqualified.

== Participation overview ==
Table key
◁	Last place
◇	Entry selected but did not compete
†	Upcoming event

Participation history
Year	Artist	Song	Language	Final	Points	Semi	Points
2008	Miodio	"Complice"	Italian	Failed to qualify		19 ◁	5
2011	Senit (Senhit)	"Stand By"	English	Failed to qualify		16	34
2012	Valentina Monetta	"The Social Network Song (Oh Oh – Uh – Oh Oh)"	English	Failed to qualify		14	31
2013	Valentina Monetta	"Crisalide (Vola)"	Italian	Failed to qualify		11	47
2014	Valentina Monetta	"Maybe"	English	24	14	10	40
2015	Anita Simoncini and Michele Perniola	"Chain of Lights"	English	Failed to qualify		16	11
2016	Serhat	"I Didn't Know"	English	Failed to qualify		12	68
2017	Valentina Monetta and Jimmie Wilson	"Spirit of the Night"	English	Failed to qualify		18 ◁	1
2018	Jessika feat. Jenifer Brening	"Who We Are"	English	Failed to qualify		17	28
2019	Serhat	"Say Na Na Na"	English	19	77	8	150
2020	Senhit ◇	"Freaky!" ◇	English ◇	Contest cancelled (Note: The 2020 contest was cancelled due to the COVID-19 pandemic.)			
2021	Senhit (Note: Performance contains uncredited live vocals from Flo Rida.)	"Adrenalina"	English	22	50	9	118
2022	Achille Lauro	"Stripper"	Italian, English	Failed to qualify		14	50
2023	Piqued Jacks	"Like an Animal"	English	Failed to qualify		16 ◁	0
2024	Megara	"11:11"	Spanish	Failed to qualify		14	16
2025	Gabry Ponte	"Tutta l'Italia"	Italian	26 ◁	27	10	46
2026	Senhit (Note: Performance contains uncredited live vocals from Boy George.)	"Superstar"	English	Failed to qualify		14	41
2027	Confirmed intention to participate †						

== Related involvement ==
=== Heads of delegation ===
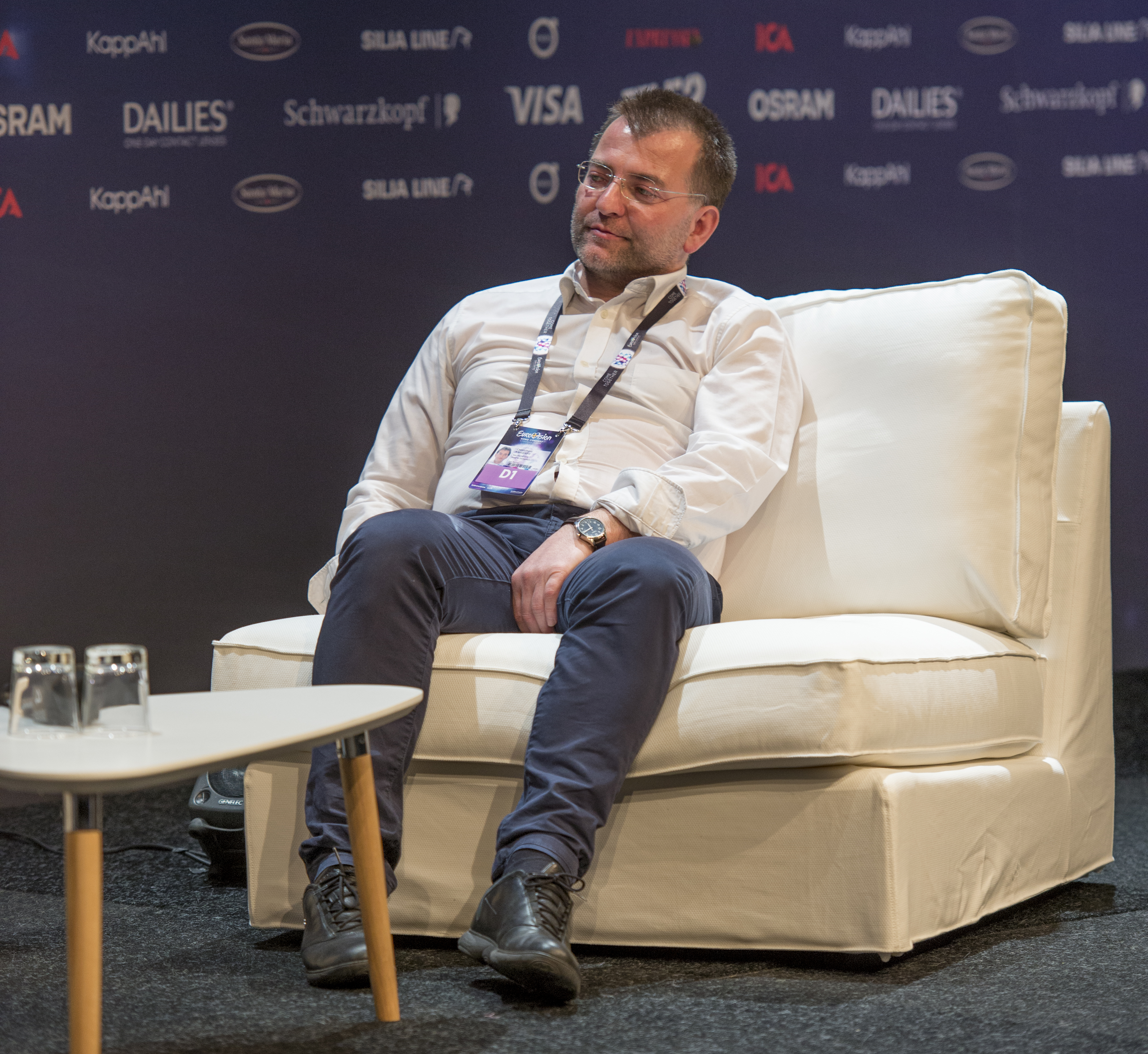
Alessandro Capicchioni has been the head of the San Marino Delegation since its debut at the event, until the 2025 edition.

Each participating broadcaster in the Eurovision Song Contest assigns a head of delegation as the EBU's contact person and the leader of their delegation at the event. The delegation, whose size can greatly vary, includes a head of press, the performers, songwriters, composers, and backing vocalists, among others.

Heads of delegation
Year	Name	Ref.
2008–2025	Alessandro Capicchioni	
2026–present	Denny Montesi	

=== Jury members ===
Each participating broadcaster assembles a jury panel consisting of music industry professionals for the semi-finals and final of the Eurovision Song Contest, ranking all entries except their own. The juries' votes constitute 50% of the overall result alongside televoting. The modern incarnation of jury voting was introduced beginning with the 2009 contest.

Jury members
Year	First member	Second member	Third member	Fourth member	Fifth member	Sixth member	Seventh member	Ref.
2011	Sonia Tura	Massimiliano Messieri	Chiara Masi	Cristina Polverelli	Laura Casetta			
2012	Marco Capicchioni	Massimiliano Messieri	Laura Casetta	Giulia Lazarini	Angelo Guidi			
2013	Massimiliano Messieri	Fabio Guidi	Viola Conti	Monica Moroni	Boris Casadei			
2014	Sara Ghiotti	Lorenzo Salvatori	Andrea Gattei	Maria Ugolini	Paolo Macina			
2015	Barbara Andreini	Ilaria Ercolani	Katalin Pribelszki	Matteo Venturini	Nicola Della Valle			
2016	Leonardo Bollini	Gea Gasperoni	Monica Moroni	Oder	Carlo Chiaruzzi			
2017	Fabrizio Raggi	Roberto Fabbri	Monica Sarti	Dorian Pazzini	Susanna Sacchi			
2018	Augusto Ciavatta	Ilaria Ercolani	Veronica Conti	Lo Strego	Claudio Podeschi			
2019	Danilo Berardi	Elia Gasperoni	Marilia Reffi	Paolo Rondelli	Sabrina Minguzzi			
2021	Antonio Cecchetti	Elisa Manzaroli	Fabrizio Raggi	Jimmy JDKA	Marilia Reffi			
2023	Francesco Stefanelli	Lewis Busignani	Luca Zucchi	Barbara Andreini	Sabrina Minguzzi			
2024	Augusto Ciavatta	Viola Conti	Michele Giardi	Nicola Giaquinto	Camilla Ortolani			
2025	Alessandro Riccardi	Fabrizio Raggi	Piermatteo Carattoni	Olivia Marani	Sofia Toccaceli			
2026	Alberto Carlo Braschi	Elia Rinaldi	Fabrizio Raggi	Martin Minotti	Amalia Gozi	Sara Raschi	Sofia Checcetti	

=== Commentators and spokespeople ===
For the show's broadcast on SMRTV, various commentators have provided comment on the contest in the local language. At the contest, after all points are calculated, the presenters of the show call upon each voting broadcaster to invite each respective spokesperson to announce the results of their vote. In 2014, San Marino RTV also provided an English commentary for their internet streaming, with John Kennedy O'Connor and Jamarie Milkovic. O'Connor reprised this role for both the 2015 and 2016 contests.

Commentators and spokespeople
Years	Channel	Commentators	Spokespeople	Ref.
2008	SMRTV	Lia Fiorio and Gigi Restivo	Roberto Moretti	
2008	Radio San Marino	Emilia Romagna	Roberto Moretti	
2009–2010	No broadcast		Did not participate	
2011	SMtv San Marino	Lia Fiorio and Gigi Restivo	Nicola Della Valle	
2012	SMtv San Marino	Lia Fiorio and Gigi Restivo	Monica Fabbri	
2013	SMtv San Marino	Lia Fiorio and Gigi Restivo	John Kennedy O'Connor	
2014	San Marino RTV, Radio San Marino	Lia Fiorio and Gigi Restivo (Italian)	Michele Perniola	
2014	SMtv Web TV	John Kennedy O'Connor and Jamarie Milkovic (English)	Michele Perniola	
2015	San Marino RTV, Radio San Marino	Lia Fiorio and Gigi Restivo	Valentina Monetta	
2016	San Marino RTV, Radio San Marino	Lia Fiorio and Gigi Restivo	Irol MC	
2017	San Marino RTV, Radio San Marino	Lia Fiorio and Gigi Restivo	Lia Fiorio	
2018	San Marino RTV, Radio San Marino	Lia Fiorio and Gigi Restivo	John Kennedy O'Connor	
2019	San Marino RTV, Radio San Marino	Lia Fiorio and Gigi Restivo	Monica Fabbri	
2020	Not announced before cancellation			
2021	San Marino RTV, Radio San Marino	Lia Fiorio and Gigi Restivo	Monica Fabbri	
2022	San Marino RTV, Radio San Marino	Lia Fiorio and Gigi Restivo	Labiuse	
2023	San Marino RTV, Radio San Marino	Lia Fiorio and Gigi Restivo	John Kennedy O'Connor	
2024	San Marino RTV	Lia Fiorio and Gigi Restivo	Kida	
2025	San Marino RTV	Anna Gaspari and Gigi Restivo	Senhit	
2026	San Marino RTV	Anna Gaspari and Gigi Restivo	Kelly Joyce	

== Photo gallery ==
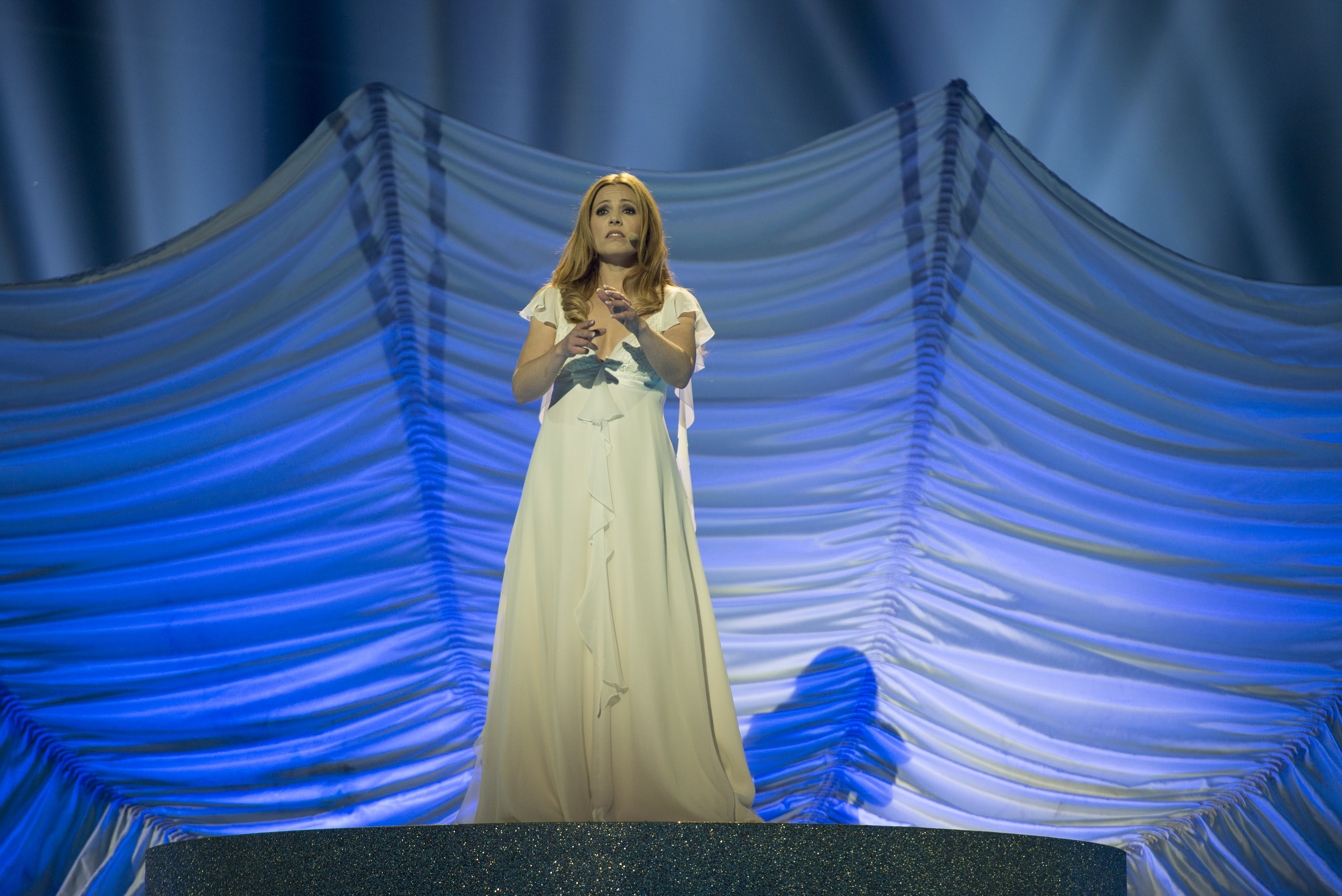
Valentina Monetta in Copenhagen (2014)

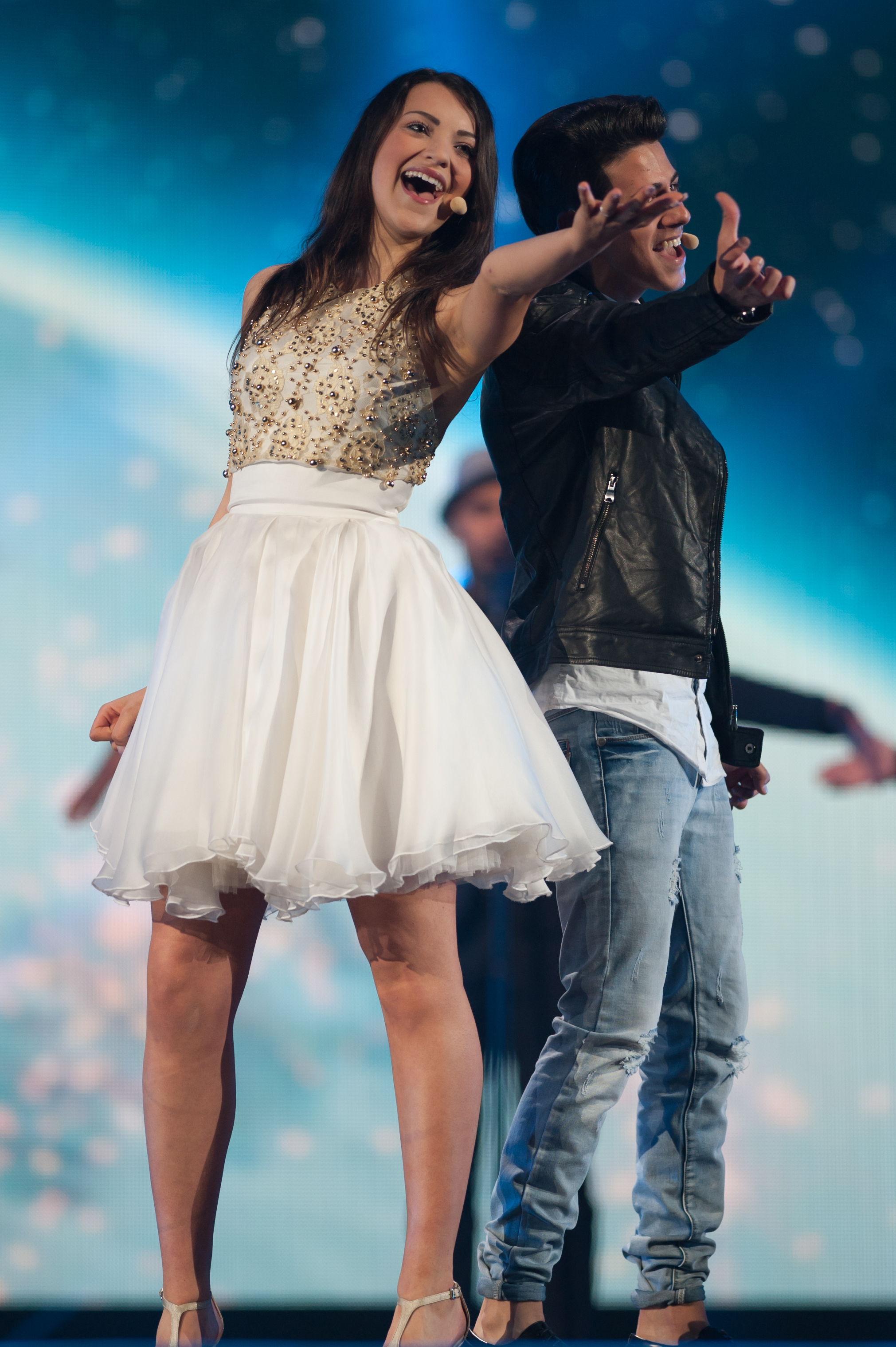
Anita Simoncini and Michele Perniola in Vienna (2015)

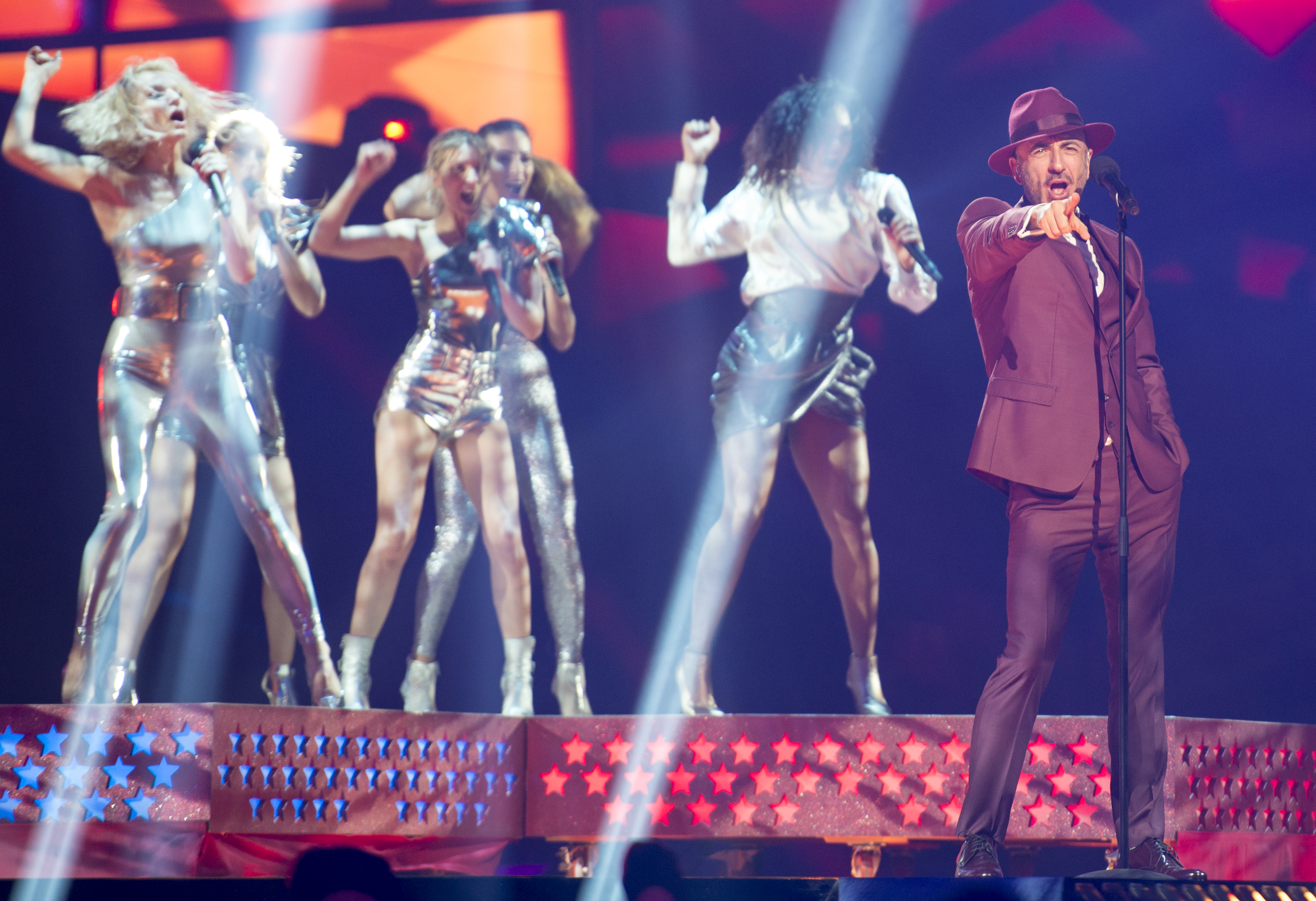
Serhat in Stockholm (2016)

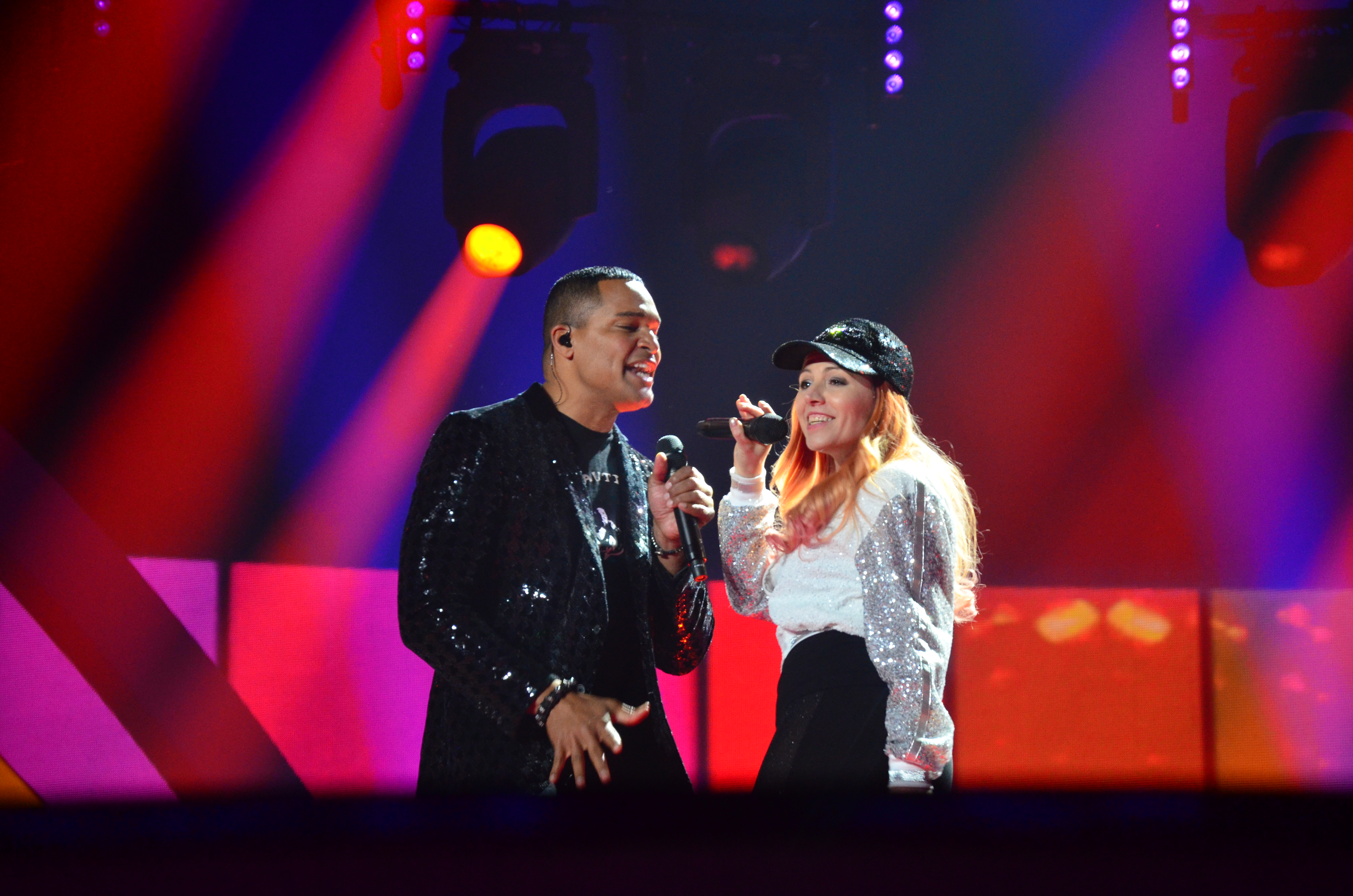
Valentina Monetta and Jimmie Wilson in Kyiv (2017)

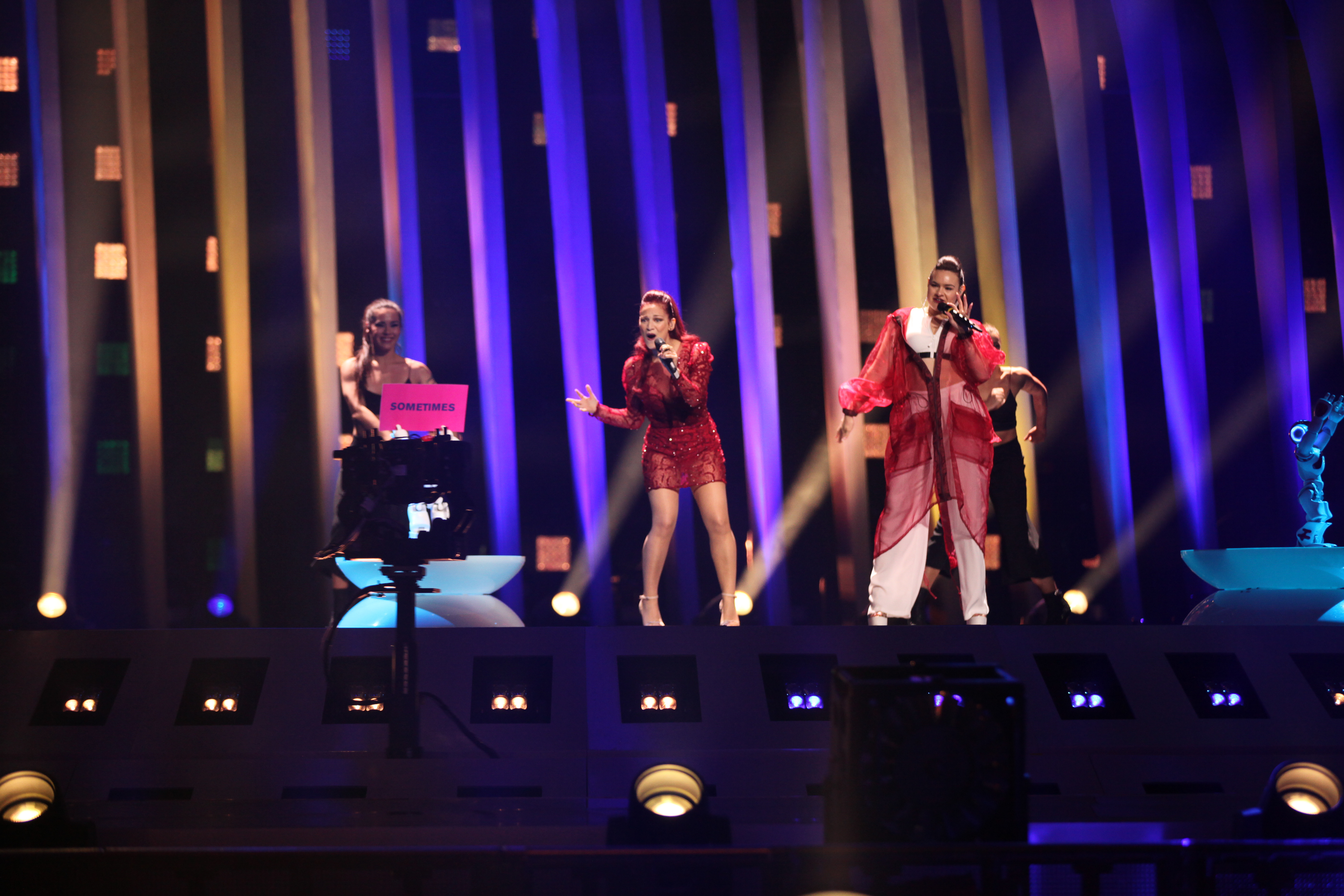
Jessika and Jenifer Brening in Lisbon (2018)

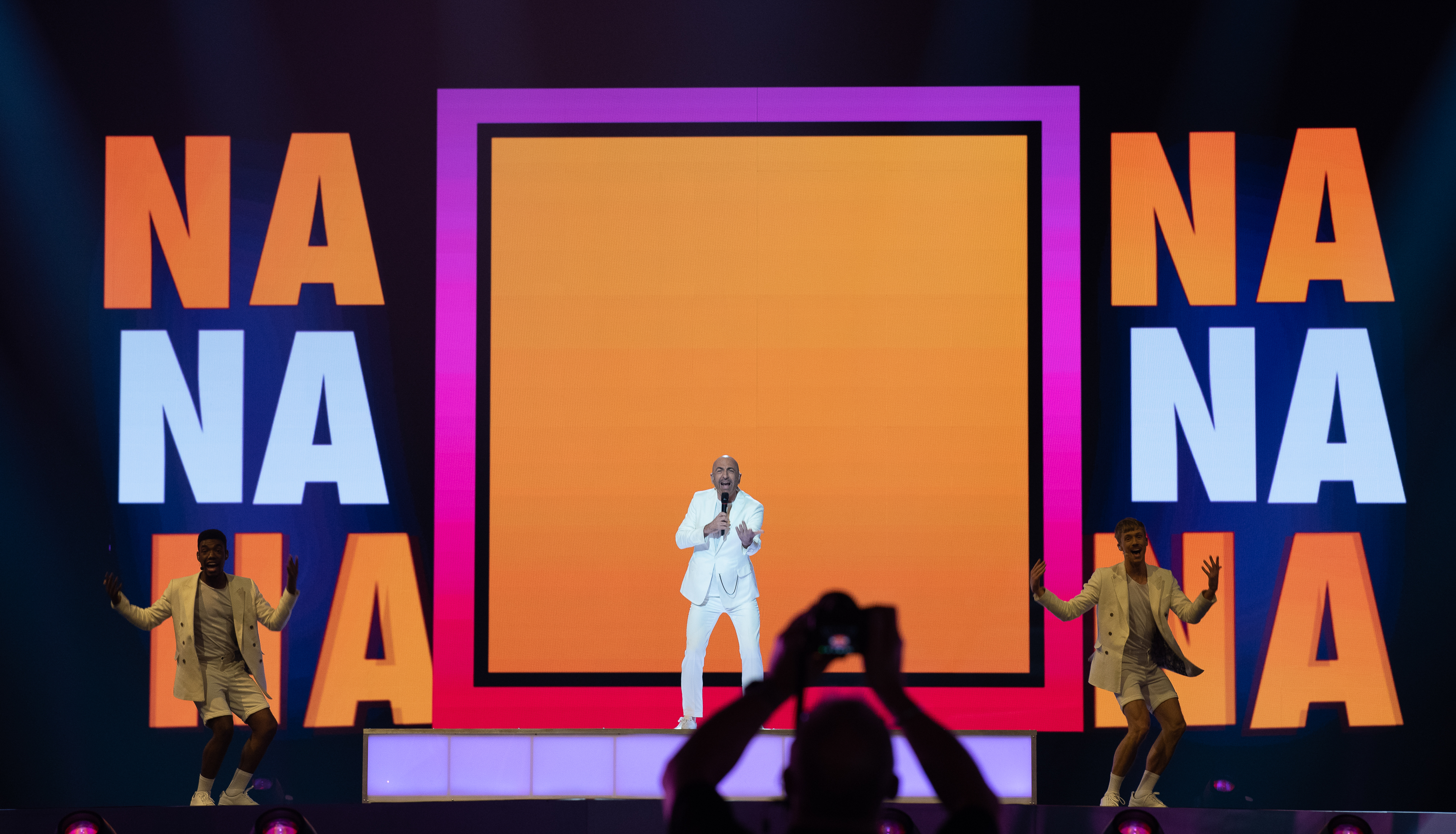
Serhat in Tel Aviv (2019)

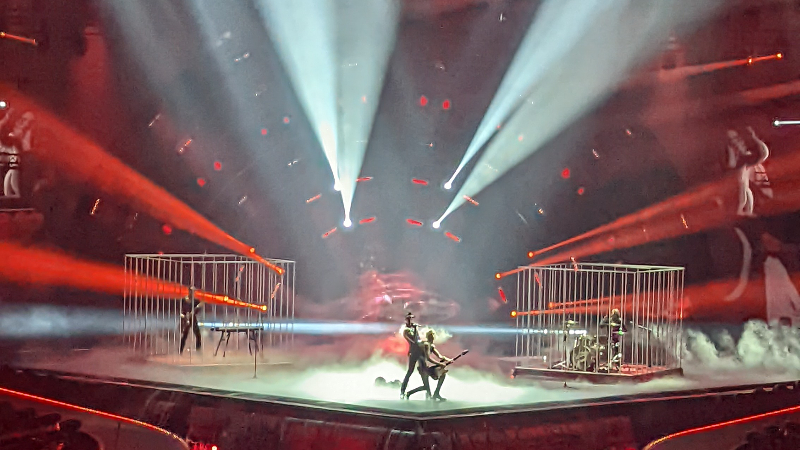
Achille Lauro in Turin (2022)

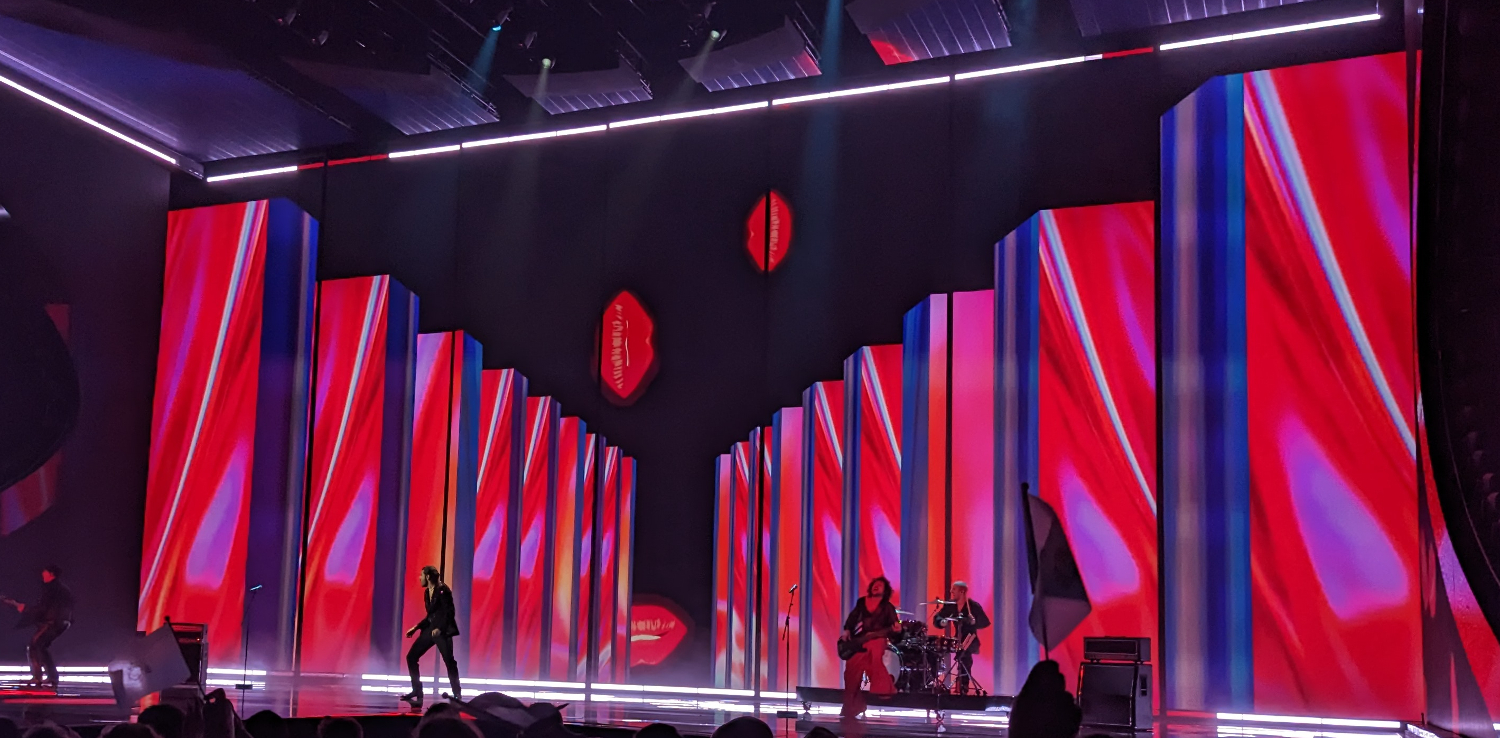
Piqued Jacks in Liverpool (2023)

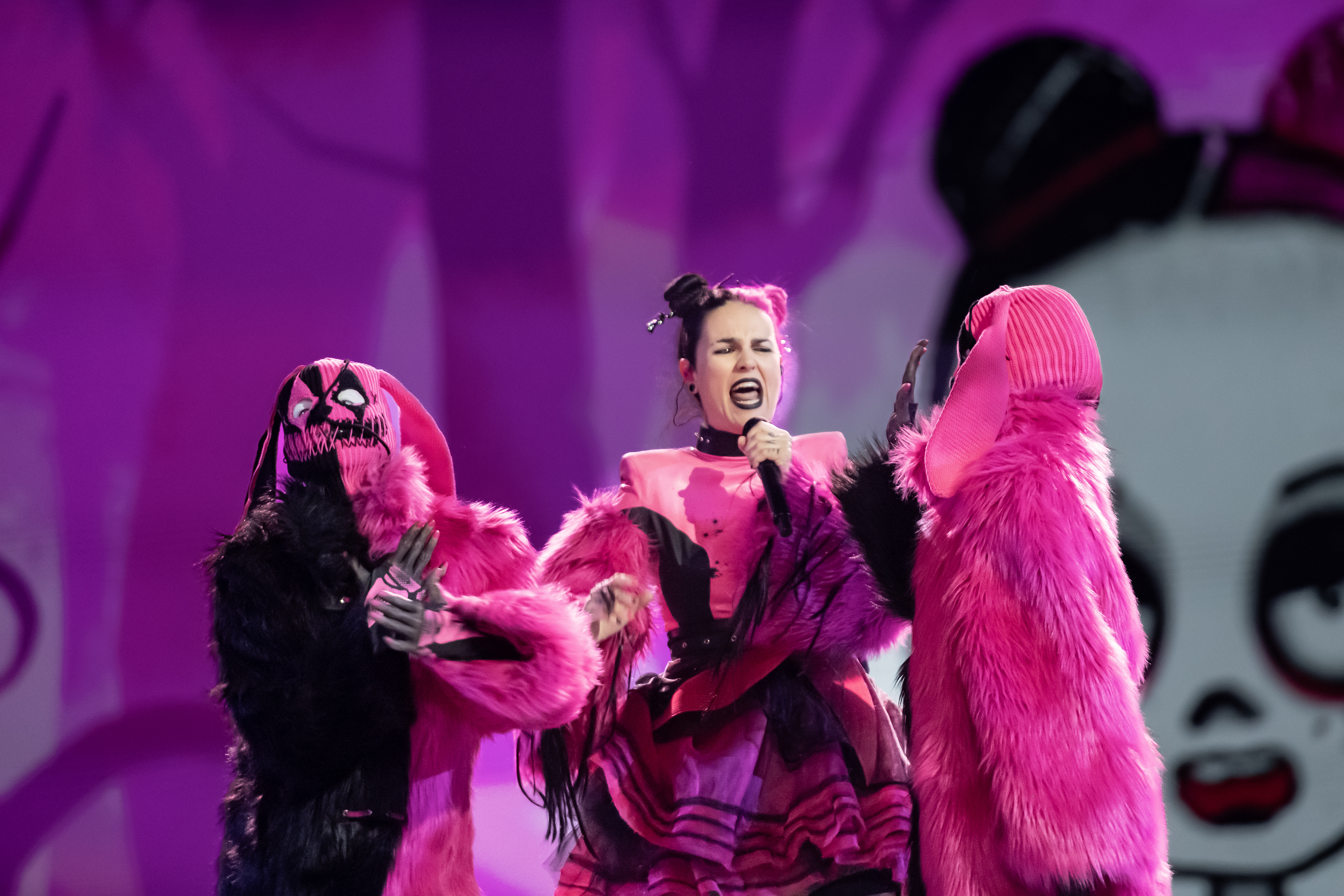
Megara in Malmö (2024)

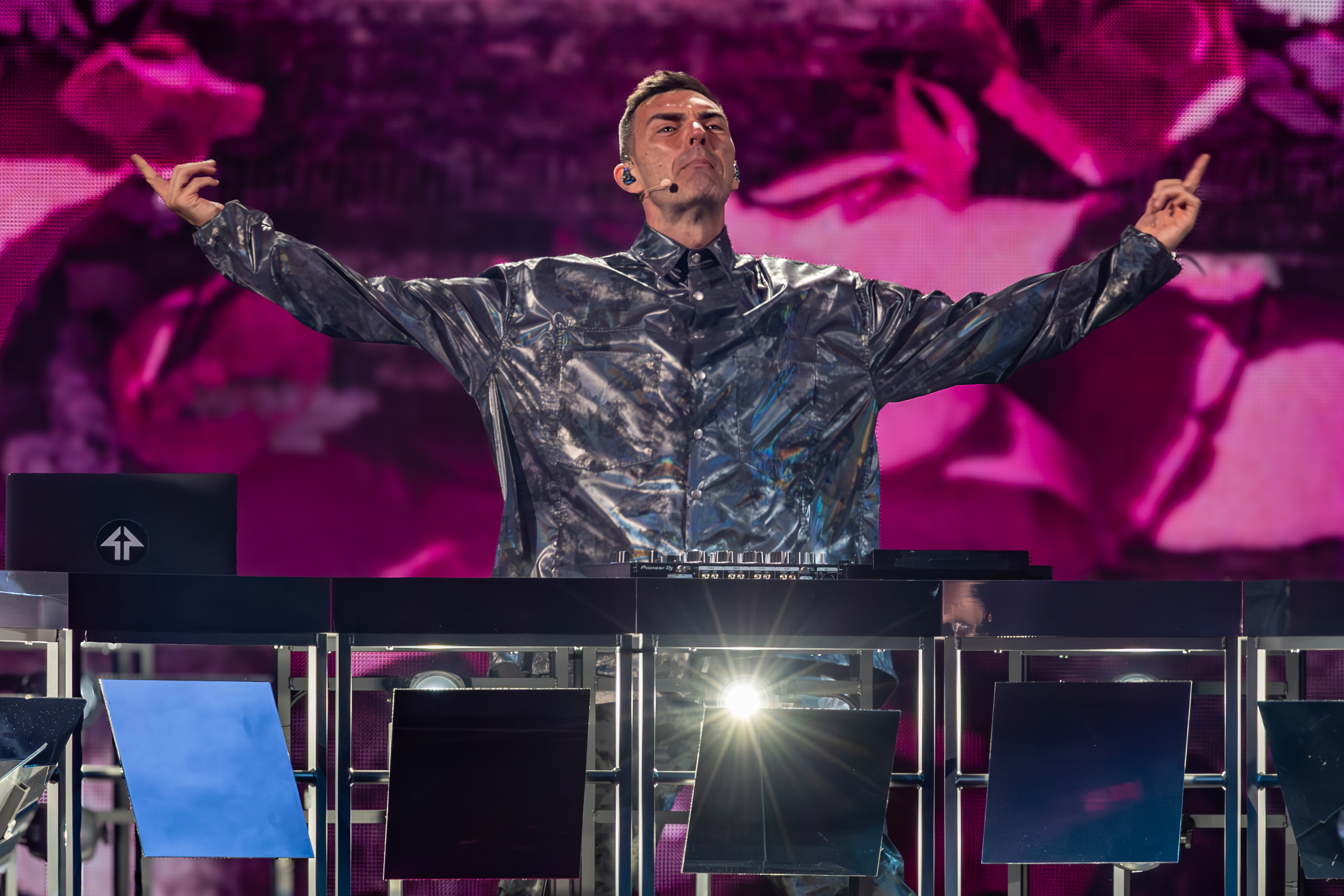
Gabry Ponte in Basel (2025)

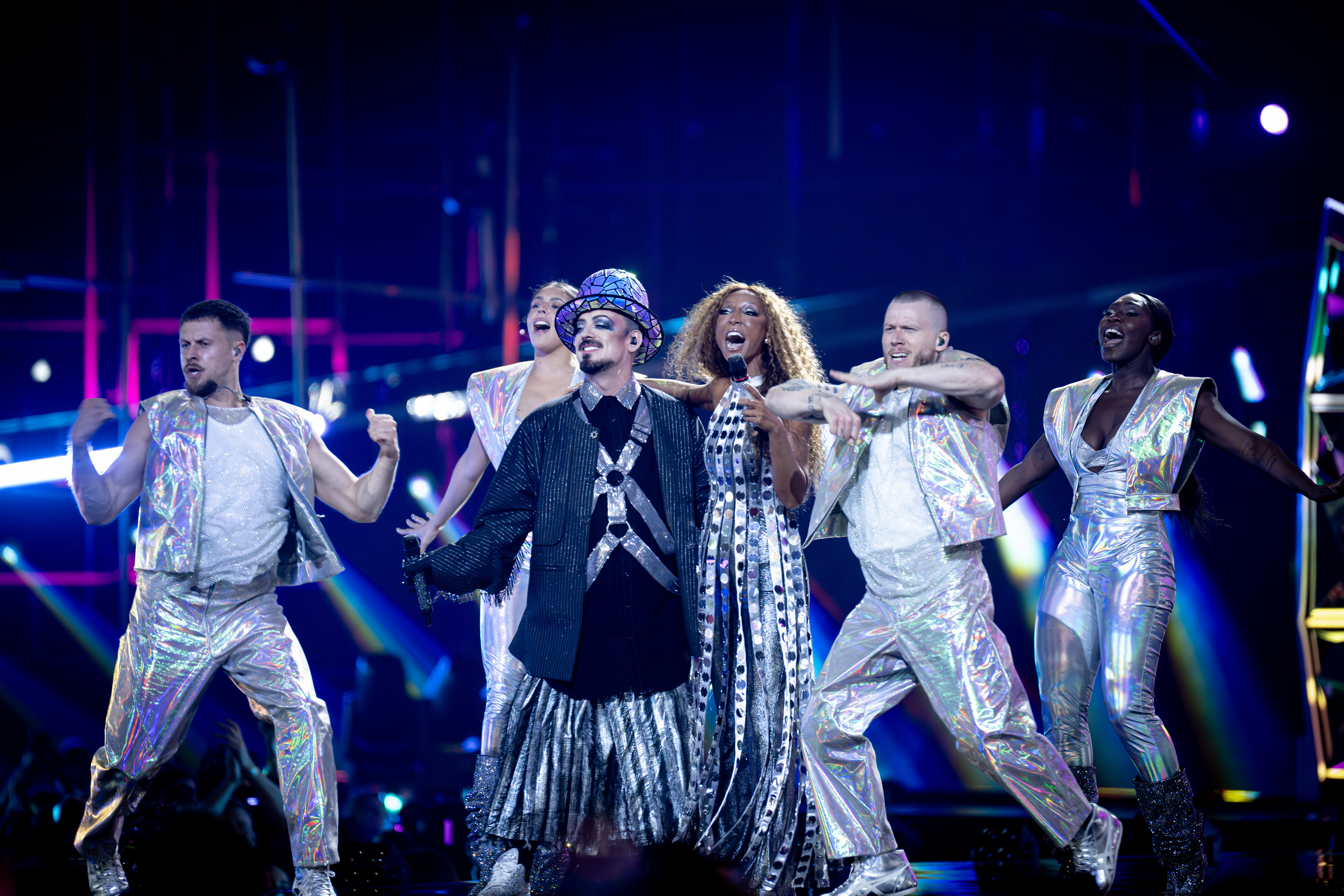
Senhit and Boy George in Vienna (2026)

== See also ==
- San Marino in the Junior Eurovision Song Contest
