= Jimmie Wilson (singer) =

American singer and musical theatre actor

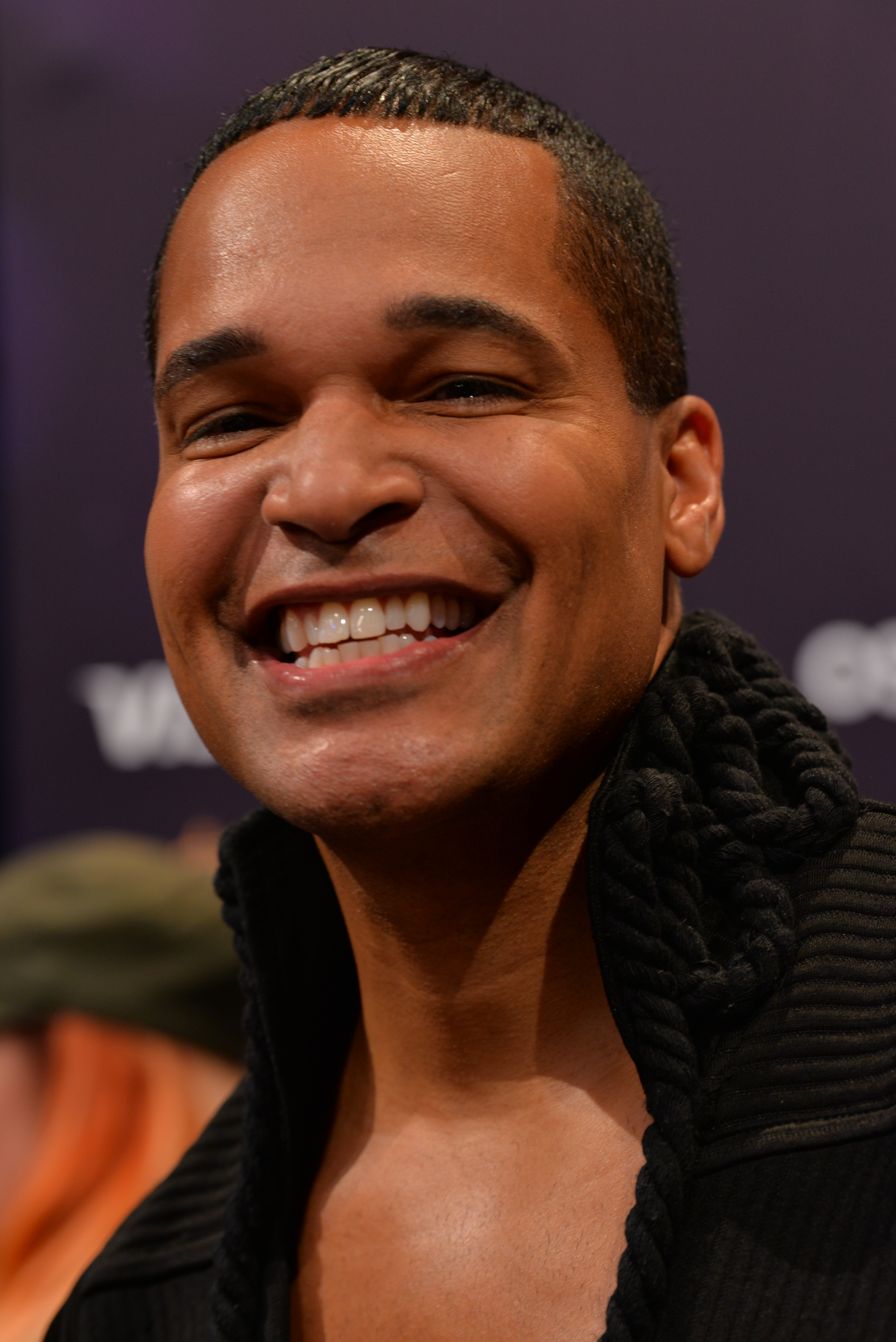
- Wilson in 2017

Background information
- Born: Detroit, Michigan, U.S.
- Genres: R&B; soul
- Occupations: Singer; Songwriter; musical theatre actor
- Instrument: Vocals

Jimmie Wilson is an American singer and musical theatre actor. He represented San Marino in the Eurovision Song Contest 2017, with the song "Spirit of the Night" in a duet with Sammarinese singer Valentina Monetta but failed to qualify for the final.

== Career ==
He studied acting in Hollywood, and then acted in the musical Sisterella, produced by Michael Jackson. He later moved to Germany to play Barack Obama in the musical Hope! – Das Obama Musical. In 2012 he took part in the third series of the Polish version of Must Be the Music. He was eliminated in the semi-finals.

== Discography ==
=== Albums ===
Title	Details
So Damn Beautiful	Released: 12 May 2017; Label: So Damn Beautiful Recordings; Formats: Digital download, CD

=== Singles ===
==== As lead artist ====
Title	Year	Album
"Spirit of the Night" (with Valentina Monetta)	2017	Non-album single
"So Damn Beautiful"	2017	So Damn Beautiful

==== As featured artist ====
Title	Year	Album
"Summer Time" (Burak Yeter featuring Jimmie Wilson)	2014	Non-album singles
"No More" (Divided Souls, Le Alen and Samuri featuring Jimmie Wilson)	2014	Non-album singles
"We Can Touch the Sky" (DJ Andi featuring Jimmie Wilson)	2014	Non-album singles

==== Promotional singles ====
Title	Year	Album
"You're the One (Miss Model of the World)"	2015	Non-album singles
"The Color Red"	2016	Non-album singles

Preceded by Serhat with "I Didn't Know"	San Marino in the Eurovision Song Contest; 2017 (with Valentina Monetta)	Succeeded by Jessika feat. Jenifer Brening with "Who We Are"
