= The Social Network Song =

2012 song by Valentina Monetta

Single by Valentina Monetta

from the album La storia di Valentina Monetta
- Released: 16 March 2012
- Recorded: 2012
- Genre: Dance-pop
- Length: 3:00
- Songwriter(s): Timothy Touchton, Jose Santana Rodriguez, Ralph Siegel
- Producer(s): Ralph Siegel

Valentina Monetta singles chronology
"The Social Network Song" (2012)	"Crisalide (Vola)" (2013)

Eurovision Song Contest 2012 entry
- Country: San Marino
- Artist(s): Valentina Monetta
- Language: English
- Composer(s): Ralph Siegel
- Lyricist(s): Timothy Touchton, Jose Santana Rodriguez

Finals performance
- Semi-final result: 14th
- Semi-final points: 31

Entry chronology
- ◄ "Stand By" (2011)
- "Crisalide (Vola)" (2013) ►

"The Social Network Song (OH OH - Uh - OH OH)" (originally titled "Facebook Uh, Oh, Oh (A Satirical Song)") is a song by singer Valentina Monetta which was the Sammarinese entrant at the Eurovision Song Contest 2012. At the Eurovision Song Contest 2012 the song finished in 14th place in the first semi-final with 31 points, although it did not qualify for the final, this was their best result since their début in the 2008. "The Social Network Song" was the 20th Eurovision entrant produced by Ralph Siegel.

== Background ==
"Facebook Uh, Oh, Oh (A Satirical Song)" was chosen internally by the San Marino broadcaster SMRTV to represent San Marino at the Eurovision Song Contest 2012.

On 18 March 2012, a few days after the song was announced, the EBU deemed that the song contained an unreasonable commercial message for Facebook, which resulted in the lyrics' disqualification; according to the Eurovision Rule 1.2.2.g, commercial messages within songs are not allowed. San Marino was given the option of submitting a new song, or revising the lyrics to remove any references to Facebook, no later than 12:00 CET on 23 March 2012.

On 22 March 2012, SMRTV announced that the song and its lyrics has been revised with a new title, "The Social Network Song (OH OH – Uh - OH OH)", with mostly the same lyrics, except without directly mentioning Facebook.

== Music video ==
The music video for the song premiered on 17 March 2012, during a special programme from SMRTV, who presented the song. The video was then made available on YouTube, on Monetta's official channel.

In the video, Monetta, styled more like a teenager than a mature woman, "can be seen dancing around her computer in a bedroom with cheesy thought bubbles popping up above her head."

Following a re-submission of the song, a new music video for the song was released on 23 March 2012, which featured the new version of the song.

== Reception ==
The song received mixed to negative reviews. Forbes.com writer Ewan Spence described San Marino's entry as "the most cringe-worthy Eurovision song in many years. Composer Ralph Siegel, who's behind nineteen previous Eurovision songs in his career, should know better."

== At Eurovision ==
Monetta was drawn to perform the song in 11th place in the first semi-final, and finished that semi-final in 14th place with 31 points. Despite its failure to advance to the final, the entry was San Marino's best placing at Eurovision.

Monetta performed in blue leather trousers and jacket, with a silvery top and matching heels. The set was lit by blue spotlights. The background singers wore a variety of costumes and, except for a female guitar player, were all carrying mobile phones. During the performance speech bubbles with "oh" and "uh" – referencing the song's subtitle – were flashed in the background by LEDs.
