= Massimiliano Messieri =

Italian composer (born 1964)

Massimiliano Messieri (born 1964) is a musician and scholar with a doctorate in composition, electronic music, and violoncello. He was selected to take part in specialization courses in composition at the Music Academy of Fiesole held by G. Manzoni (1991–1992) and at the Academie d’Eté of the IRCAM held by T. Murail and P. Manoury (Paris, 1993–1994).

== Early life and education ==
Messieri was born in Bologna, Emilia-Romagna, in 1964, and moved with his parents to San Marino aged four. He began studying cello at the Sammarinese Musical Institute in 1977, enrolling the following year in Rimini's teacher training institute. Aged 16, he returned to the Sammarinese Musical Institute to study composition, but was left in a month-long coma after a traffic collision, which caused him to lose his memory. He recovered his memory over the subsequent two years, obtaining his high school diploma in 1982.

Aged 24, Messieri graduated from the "B. Maderna" Conservatory in Cesena, where he enrolled in a composition course under Gilberto Cappelli. Messieri's early compositions received some success; his Metamorfosi (1990) won a local competition in Cesena, while his La rosa del deserto (1991) won a competition in Bologna.

Messieri later enrolled at the Conservatorio Giovanni Battista Martini in Bologna, where he was a contemporary of Alessandro Solbiati, and studied under Giacomo Manzoni, Franco Donatoni, Aldo Clementi, Ivan Fedele, Niccolò Castiglioni, Gérard Grisey, and Lelio Camilleri. Camilleri inspired him to attend IRCAM's Academie d’Eté in Paris between 1993 and 1994, where Messieri was a contemporary of Tristan Murail and Philippe Manoury. Messieri graduated in electronic music in 1997.

== Career ==
While still at university, Messieri composed several ballets with the Chorea Dance Company. In 1994, with artist Daniela Carati, organised an artistic project in Bologna investigating the debut works of painters, sculptors, composers, and poets. In 1996, Messieri and Carati published a book, Reazioni interattive.

Messieri rose to fame with the double concerto Virus (1997), which won the 1997 "2 August" International Composition Competition, organised by Bologna's municipal government in memory of the victims of the Bologna massacre. The piece was performed by the Toscanini Orchestra in Bologna's Piazza Maggiore and broadcast live on Radio RAI 3.

Following his success, Messieri was commissioned by an international Mozart festival association in Rovereto, under the aegis of the International Mozarteum Foundation in Salzburg, to write Don Giovanni, il dissoluto redento (1998), for which Carati produced video installations. The commission led Messieri to be appointed a Mozart Academic (Accademico Mozartiano).

Messieri moved to Genoa in 1999, where he collaborated with the Pierpaolo Koss Dance Company to write Cabaret selvaggio, and began writing Zadig, a collection of 21 caprices for solo cello. In 2000, the National Research Institute for Material Physics in Genoa commissioned Messieri, for the INFMeeting 2000, to compose Leonids’ Play, a composition for five magnetic tapes based on the real sound of the Leonids provided by NASA.

Having moved to Leipzig, where he tutored in musical analysis and instruction, Messieri was commissioned by the cultural society of Aschersleben to compose Sojour in Leipzig, twelve musical portraits for cello and pianno, which were performed in the Schloss Ettersburg two years later.

In 2002, Messieri returned to San Marino to teach at the Sammarinese Musical Institute, where he met saxophonist Michele Selva, with whom he formed a duo that debuted in Dresden and Prague, releasing two compact discs. In 2004, Messieri returned to Ettesburg for the production of Gretchens Traum.

in 2008, Xiao Dong Wei commissioned him Capriccio for Xiao Dong for solo erhu, which will be played in 2013 in the version for ehru and ensemble (Fantasia for Xiao Dong Wei) for ArtX Detroit at the Max M. Fisher Music Center, Detroit (Xiao Dong Wei, erhu; DSO Chamber Ensemble and Yuki Mack, piano).

In 2009, Messieri became the artistic director of the San Marino Ensemble and a Sammarinese international festival dedicated to new music.

In 2012, the Cracow Philharmonic String Quartet commissioned him Liriche Sacre (eleven verses of the Old Testament for alto and string quartet) that it is played the same year at the Cracovia Sacra Festival (Church of the Sacred Heart of Jesus, 15 August 2012).

In 2018 the Mascagni Conservatory of Music in Livorno dedicates him a concert for the "Suoni Inauditi" International Festival, commissioning him Salmo XLIII, lyric for soprano, male chorus, baritone saxophone and live electronics (Elena Tereshchenko, soprano; Valerio Barbieri, saxophone; Maestro Gabriele Micheli, conductor); in the same year Nicola Baroni commissioned him BET (Concerto grosso for soprano, 4 cellos and violoncello orchestra) for the Modern Festival of the Teatro Comunale in Bologna.

== Interests ==
Messieri is interested in contemporary arts, and has focused his music research in particular on the interaction among these arts. He has composed several ballets with the Chorea Dance Company, including Espressione I (Bologna, 1994), Quintetto (Bergamo, 1994), Tarkìz (Bologna, 1995), and Cabaret Selvaggio (Milan, 1999) with the Pierpaolo Koss Dance Company.

While initially structuralist in his approach, from 2004, Mesiseri has come closer to sound in its physical aspect.

== Main works ==
- 1988 6 Miniature – for clarinet and piano
- 1990 Metamorfosi – for solo piano
- 1991 La rosa del deserto – ballet in six scenes for voice, instrumental group and live electronics
- 1992 Hauptweg und nebenwege for symphony orchestra, piano and live electronics
- 1993 Espressione I for alto sax, live electronics and tape
- 1994 ...Ans torn... for soprano and flute
- 1995 Les rêves de la couleur for large orchestra and tape
- 1996 Vita lux erat for alto sax and percussions
- 1997 Virus – double concerto for violin, piano and symphonic orchestra
- 1998 Don Giovanni il dissoluto redento – Tafelmusik for soloists, ensemble, live electronics, digital tape, and guests, with video installations by Carati
- 1999 Cabaret selvaggio – seven musical pictures for 5 dancers and digital tape
- 2000 Leonids’ play – a composition for five magnetic tapes
- 2001 La femme battue IX capriccio per violoncello solo (dall’opera Zadig, 21 capricci)
- 2002 Sojourn in Leipzig – twelve musical portraits for cello and piano
- 2003 Die Märchenprinzfantasien for alto saxophone and digital tape
- 2004 Gretchens Träum – melodrama for four actresses and two saxophones with an accompanying CD
- 2005 Das Klangkarussell for solo piano
- 2006 Jack in the box: La scatola magica di Mefisto chamber delirium suite, loosely based on the homonymous story by Fabrizio Boggiano, for musician, video projections, saxophone (soprano and alto), digital audio and live electronics
- 2007 am Kreuzweg deiner Sinne duo for clarinet and piano
- 2008 Forever for soprano saxophone, triangle and live electronics
- 2009 Piuma di cielo for flute, violin, cello, harp and piano
- 2010 Quartetto No.2 for string quartet
- 2011 Fantasia for Xiao Dong Wei fantasy for erhu and ensemble
- 2012 Liriche Sacre eleven verses from the Old Testament for alto and string quartet
- 2013 Hot Strings II (new version) capriccio for four harps
- 2014 Land prelude for four harps
- 2015 A.H. fantasy for three cellos, conductor, interactive system and live electronics
- 2016 ALICE opera in 2 acts
- 2017 Nel mezzo del cammin di nostra vita small fantasy for string orchestra, triangle and piano
- 2018 BET concerto grosso for soprano, 4 cellos and violoncello orchestra
- 2019 TAV psalm for 4 percussionists and electronics
- 2020 12 Haiku for solo piano
- 2021 Fantasia Concertante for piano and string orchestra

== CDs ==
Messieri/Selva released two audio CDs with Drycastle Records of Arezzo: Noises X (2007) and MA$KEN (2009).

In 2017, he recorded with his friend Nicola Baroni, for the record label Amadeus Arte, "Zadig" 21 Capricios for solo cello (also hypercello), where Nicola Baroni also writes the Max/Msp System for hypercello.

In 2020 during the Covid pandemic, Messieri writes a series of compositions for solo piano, and a year later they are recorded on "Islands" Cd by Patrizia Romanello for the Amadeus Arte Label.
