= I Didn't Know =

Song by Serhat

Single by Serhat

from the EP I Didn't Know (Eurovision Song Contest 2016)
- Released: 9 March 2016
- Label: CAP-Sounds
- Songwriter(s): Olcayto Ahmet Tuğsuz; Nektarios Tyrakis

Serhat singles chronology
| "Je m'adore" (2014) | "I Didn't Know" (2016) | "Total Disguise" (2018) |

Music video
- "I Didn't know (live performance)" on YouTube

Eurovision Song Contest 2016 entry
- Country: San Marino
- Artist(s): Serhat
- Language: English
- Composer(s): Olcayto Ahmet Tuğsuz
- Lyricist(s): Nektarios Tyrakis

Finals performance
- Semi-final result: 12th
- Semi-final points: 68

Entry chronology
- ◄ "Chain of Lights" (2015)
- "Spirit of the Night" (2017) ►

"I Didn't Know" is a song by Turkish singer, producer and television presenter Serhat. The song was composed by Olcayto Ahmet Tuğsuz with the lyrics written by Nektarios Tyrakis. It was released on 9 March 2016, and represented San Marino in the Eurovision Song Contest 2016. Later in March it was decided that the original version would be replaced by the disco version in the contest. The song was performed by Serhat, who was selected internally by the Sammarinese national broadcaster San Marino RTV (SMRTV) to represent San Marino in the 2016 contest in Stockholm, Sweden.

Serhat represented San Marino performing in the first semi-final held on May 10, but failed to qualify to the May 14, 2016 final. In 2018, the song was recorded with American singer Martha Wash.

== Track lists ==
I Didn't Know (Eurovision Song Contest 2016) – EP

1. "I Didn't Know" (Eurovision Song Contest 2016) – 3:03
2. "I Didn't Know" (Markus Adler remix) – 3:40
3. "I Didn't Know" (dance version) – 4:28
4. "I Didn't Know" (Promostella club remix) – 5:32
5. "I Didn't Know" (disco version) – 3:58
6. "I Didn't Know" (karaoke version) – 3:03

Remixes – EP

1. "I Didn't Know" (Official ESC Version: San Marino 2016) – 3:01
2. "I Didn't Know" (Mike Rizzo Funk Generation mix) – 6:03
3. "I Didn't Know" (Cutmore club remix) – 5:02
4. "I Didn't Know" (Mike Rizzo radio edit) – 3:52
5. "I Didn't Know" (Cutmore radio edit) – 3:32
6. "I Didn't Know" (Official ESC karaoke version) – 3:01

2018 Remixes featuring Martha Wash - EP

1. "I Didn't Know" (Johans Video Mix) - 3:58
2. "I Didn't Know" (Cutmore Radio Edit) - 3:24
3. "I Didn't Know" (Markus Adler Remix) - 3:27
4. "I Didn't Know" (Johans Extended Mix) - 5:48
5. "I Didn't Know" (Cutmore Club Remix) - 4:52

== Charts ==
| Chart (2018) | Peak position |
|---|---|
| US Dance Club Songs (Billboard) | 25 |
