= Carlo Romeo =

Italian journalist, media executive

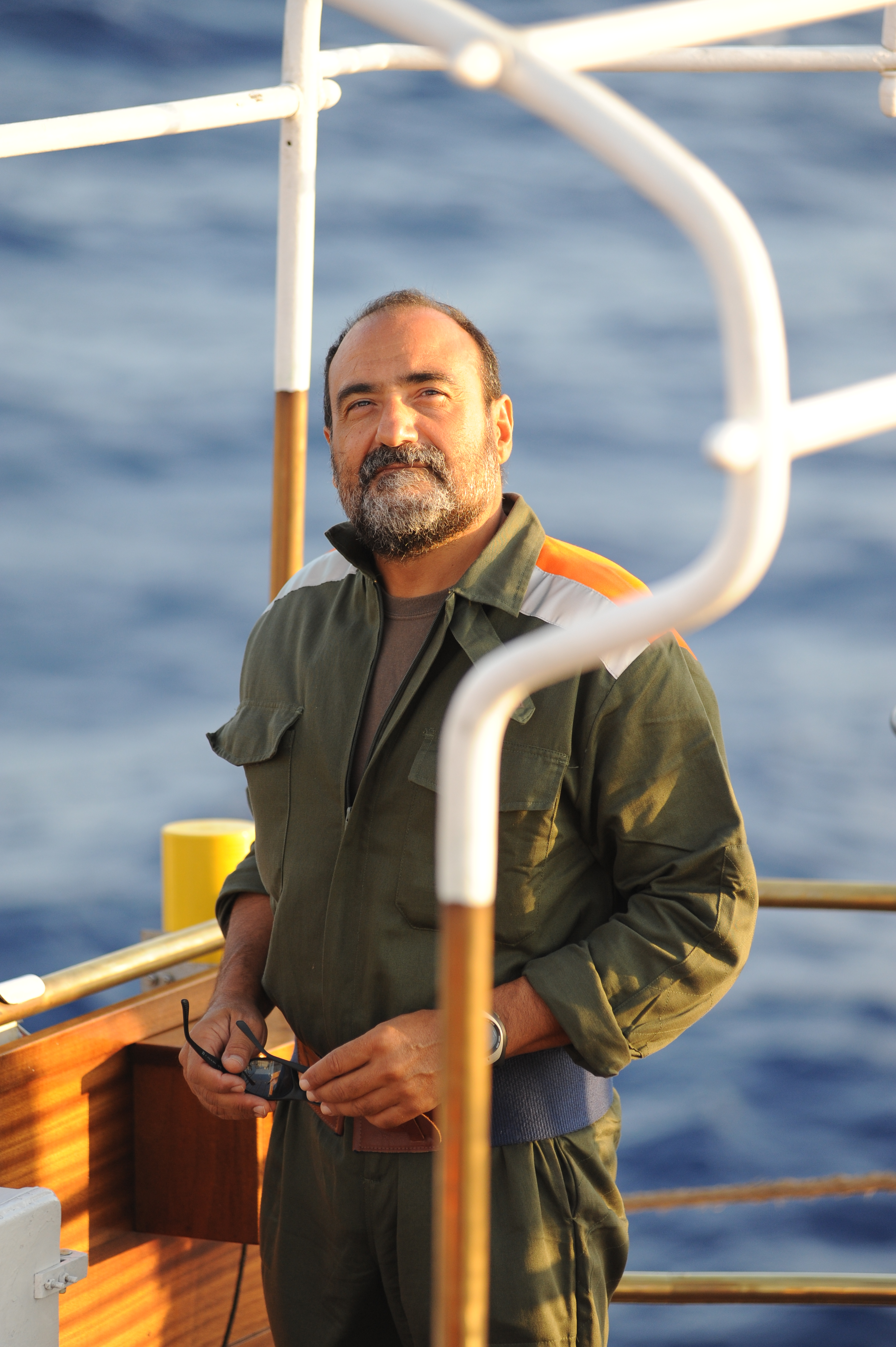
Carlo Romeo aboard the Italian training ship Amerigo Vespucci

Carlo Romeo (born 9 September 1954) is an Italian journalist and media executive. Romeo has been RAI manager for over 25 years. From 2012 to 2021, he served as General Director of the San Marino RTV, the State television of the Republic of San Marino.

== Early life ==
In 1979 Romeo graduated in Literature, specializing in Medieval Latin Paleography at Sapienza University of Rome. He was collaborator of the Italian paleographer and medievalist Armando Petrucci, working on historical studies mainly focused on written culture and Medieval literacy. He also contributed to the Biographical Dictionary of Treccani, editing the profiles of some of the historical protagonists of Rome in the X and XI centuries.

== Career ==
=== Radio Radicale and Teleroma 56 ===
At the end of the 70s, Romeo was part of the first national editorial staff of Radio Radicale. In 1981 he moved to Teleroma 56, the first Roman private broadcaster founded in 1976 by the Italian architect and professor Bruno Zevi, becoming director in 1987. Romeo carried out reportage in Lebanon (September 1983), in the former Yugoslavia during the conflict between Croatia and Serbia, in Tel Aviv during the bombings in January 1991, in Mauritania and in Burkina Faso where he interviewed Thomas Sankara in 1985. In the 1980s he was arrested and expelled from Turkey, Poland and Czechoslovakia while documenting civil rights demonstrations.

=== RAI and San Marino RTV ===
In 1995 Romeo became a managing editor in RAI, the Italian public broadcasting company, serving first as director of the RAI headquarter of Valle d'Aosta and then of Emilia-Romagna. From 2000 to November 2012 he was in charge of the Social Secretariat of RAI. In this position, he carried out social communication activities in Darfur, Bosnia and Herzegovina, Burkina Faso, Democratic Republic of Congo, in Lebanon in the refugee camp of Ain el Helwe in Sidon, in Kosovo and, since 2010, several times in Afghanistan. From 2012 to 2021 Romeo was General Director of San Marino RTV, the public service broadcasting of San Marino, founded in 1991 with a share capital by ERAS (San Marino broadcasting body) and RAI. Under his direction, San Marino RTV has reached a signal coverage of the entire Italian peninsula. From 29 October 2021, all the TV programs of the public service broadcasting are visible on the channel 831 of the Italian digital terrestrial platform.

=== Teaching activities ===
Romeo taught broadcast journalism at Libera Università Internazionale degli Studi Sociali Guido Carli (1995-1998) and at the School of Journalism of the University of Bologna (1999-2004). He has been lecturer at NATO/Isaf courses for OMLT and MAT military personnel in Afghanistan.

=== Current activities ===
Since 2019 Romeo is one the hosts of "Stampa e Regime", the morning press review of Radio Radicale. In 2020 Romeo has been nominated general adviser of the Transnational Radical Party. In 2021 he has been appointed scientific adviser for the media and communication of the Italian Navy. Since 2022 Carlo Romeo runs his personal blog, Ferian.

=== Honours ===
On 2 June 2023 at the Italian Embassy in San Marino, Carlo Romeo was awarded the title of Knight of Merit of the Italian Republic.

== Books ==
Romeo is the author of books about the sea and sailboats. His first book, "Boatpeople" (2007), was presented in Rome by the Italian writer Andrea Camilleri. In "Di mare, barche e marinai: 100 storie per prendere il largo" (2015), Romeo deals with the relationship between man and the sea through the stories of John Wayne, John F. Kennedy, and Humphrey Bogart, among the others. In his last book, "Burrasche. Diario di bordo 2022", Romeo reflects on the main events of 2022, in a logbook that intertwines current events and episodes related to the past.
