= S.E.X. Appeal =

German Eurodance band

- Origin: Germany
- Genres: Trance; dance; electronic; pop
- Years active: 1996–2018 (hiatus)
- Labels: 3H Music; Polydor; BMG Ariola
- Spinoff of: E-Rotic
- Members: Lyane Leigh; Thijs Hegemann
- Past members: Raz-Ma-Taz (1996-1996); Gino Gillian (1997-1999)
- Website: www.sexappeal-music.com

S.E.X. Appeal (simply pronounced "sex appeal", acronym for "Sensuality", "Energy" and "Xstasy") were a German trance music project by E-Rotic's former original lead singer Lyane Leigh (born Liane Hegemann) and RasMaTaz (Richard Allen Smith).

== History ==
=== 1994–95: Formation from E-Rotic to S.E.X. Appeal ===
Leigh and American-born Ras-Ma-Taz (Richard Allen Smith) were original members and vocalists of the group E-Rotic, which started in 1994 with their first three chart topping singles "Max Don't Have Sex With Your Ex", "Fred Come to Bed" and "Sex on the Phone" followed by their debut studio album Sex Affairs. After the fourth single release "Willy use a Billy...Boy" in June 1996, both members left the band due to a disagreement between Leigh and producer David Brandes, who were quickly replaced by Jeanette Christensen and Terence d'Arby, thus Leigh still had to continue to provide vocal work for E-Rotic's four follow up studio albums The Power of Sex, Sexual Madness, the ABBA cover album Thank You for the Music until 1999 to Mambo No. Sex due to her contract.

=== 1996–97: Single releases and departure of Ras-Ma-Taz ===
Instead of reclaiming the E-Rotic name, owned by Brandes, Leigh and Smith decided to form their own group under the new name S.E.X. Appeal. Their first single "Voulez-vous Coucher Avec Moi" was presented in the Disco Club "Fun" in München, Germany in 1996. The single was a hit, popular around Europe. It was song #18 in the Austrian charts for 10 weeks. Soon Smith left the band to join the group Magic Affair. Months later the singer-entertainer Gino Gillian joined the group in 1997 and they released the second single, "Life Goes Up, Life Goes Down", produced by Leigh with her brother Thijs Hegemann.

=== 1998–99: Peeping Tom and continuation as solo project ===
In February 1998 their third single, "Dirty Talk", was released by German label Jupiter Records. Six months later the next single "Sex is a Thrill with the Pill" were released. After disappointing lack of success, Leigh changed her record label, using her own established 3H Music Production company with her brother Thijs, that specialized in music production, mainly pop and dance music, remixing and artists management. The first single under the new sister-brother management, "Hanky Spanky", was released in July 1999 followed by "Manga Maniac", which appeared on their 1999 released debut studio album Peeping Tom. In 1999, Gillian left the band leaving Leigh, who decided to continue the band as a solo project, and released the fourth final single out of the album "Kids in America", a Kim Wilde cover, labeled as Lyane Leigh.

=== 2000–08: Sensuality and Sensuality - The Remix Album ===
After touring, promoting and releasing some side projects for years, such as the double A-Side single "Auf der Suche/Alles was sie wollte" as Lyane Leigh in 2001, the vocal feature on Experience Of Music's single "Hardhouse" in 2002, on Tamo's single "Another night" or the single "Du bist" both in 2003, Leigh returned to the media as S.E.X. Appeal in 2004 with a more hands-up sound instead of the eurodance sound on the previous album and singles. In 2004, the single "Do You Love Me", followed by a new version of "Fragile Love" in 2006, which already appeared on Peeping Tom in its original version. In 2007, Leigh released the third and fourth singles, "Let Me Feel Your Sexappeal", "Sensuality" and the second studio album of the same name, Sensuality. In 2008, the single "Voodoo Queen" has been released for promotion with a new edition Sensuality - The Remix Album.

=== 2009–10: Reflections and Peeping Tom Reloaded ===
In 2009, a fifth and final single "Love 2 Love" out of Sensuality and "Sex on the Phone", a cover version of the E-Rotic song, where Leigh was the band's original singer, have been released. In 2010, S.E.X. Appeal released "Gimme (Safer Sex)", a collaboration with former Mr. President rapper LayZee. Both latter mentioned singles appears on the second remix album Peeping Tom Reloaded. Later the first EP Reflections has been released. Even though it's the group's fourth major album release, this mini album features their first three singles "Voulez-Vous Coucher Avec Moi", "Life Goes Up, Life Goes Down" and "Dirty Talk", which didn't appear on their debut album Peeping Tom or any of their previous albums in general before for unknown reasons.

=== 2011–13: Russian Roulette and Return to E-Rotic ===
In 2013, the third studio album Russian Roulette has been released, preceded by the first two singles out of it, "Poison Called Love" in 2011 and "Wild Beast" in 2012. On 22 September 2013, the third single "Love is the Code" has been released. On June 19, 2013, Leigh revealed on her official site that S.E.X. Appeal's fourth studio album, to be titled Black Widow, is going to release in 2014 and eight tracks have already been named. However this release and the project as well, have been abandoned in favor for E-Rotic, when rumors came up, Leigh would reunite with David Brandes and she would return as the vocalist of the group again alongside a new rapper, Stephen Appleton.

=== 2018: Sexy Boy... Best Of 1999-2018 ===
Still in 2018, when Leigh being busy with her other solo projects and E-Rotic, a greatest hits compilation album titled Sexy Boy... Best Of 1999-2018 alongside its first and only single release, the titular "Sexy Boy" has been released to promote the album.

== Artistry ==
=== Musical style ===
Throughout the 1990s, S.E.X. Appeal's music is a mix of dance and pop music with eurodance, which was very famous and popular in Europe, Oceania and South America at that time. The style of eurodance was dance music with a female singer and a male rapper to follow a traditional verse-chorus structure. Through the fact, that the original members and vocalists of S.E.X. Appeal, Leigh and Ras-Ma-Taz, were also the original members of E-Rotic, their sound, music videos, lyrics and cover art were very reminiscent of the E-Rotic innuendo style, lyrics and sound. For events, promotion and cover arts, S.E.X. Appeal is often credited as "S.E.X. Appeal (EX) E-Rotic" or "S.E.X. Appeal feat. Lyane Leigh" for a better recognition. S.E.X. Appeal are best known for euro dance tracks like "Voulez-vous Coucher Avec Moi" and "Sex is a Thrill with the Pill". Her debut studio album Peeping Tom features mainly euro dance pop. Although there are also tracks from other genres featured, such as the pop ballad "Baby I miss You", the reggae fusion "Here we Go", the dream trance “It’s Called Atlantis” or the electronic breakbeat-driven "Kids in America", a Kim Wilde cover. These tracks don't belong to the europop genre. Following the change from eurodance to vocal trance music in the early 2000s, so S.E.X. Appeal changed their musical style this way to a more matured hands-up sound for their second studio album Sensuality from 2007. Though this album also features one disco song "Do you Love me" and the house track "Send me a Message". She kept the style for the 2013 third studio album Russian Roulette with a more return to dance pop music and classic ballads, such as "Christmas Time", B-Side of "Love is the Code".

== Discography ==
=== Studio albums ===
List of studio albums, with selected chart positions, sales figures and certifications
Title	Album details	Chart position			Info
Title	Album details	GER	AUT	SWI	Info
Peeping Tom	Released: 1999; Label: 3H Music; Formats: CD, digital download	—	—	—	Released in Germany. Features the singles "Sex is a Thrill with the Pill", "Hanky Spanky", "Manga Maniac" and "Fragile Love".
Sensuality	Released: 2007; Label: 3H Music; Formats: CD, digital download	—	—	—	Released in Germany. Features the singles "Do You Love Me", "Fragile Love", "Let Me Feel Your Sexappeal", "Sensuality" and "Love 2 Love".
Russian Roulette	Released: 2013; Label: 3H Music; Formats: CD, digital download	—	—	—	Released in Germany. Features the singles "Poison Called Love", "Wild Beast" and "Love is the Code"
"—" denotes album, that failed to chart or was not released

=== EPs ===
- 2010: Reflections

=== Remix albums ===
- 2008: Sensuality - The Remix Album
- 2010: Peeping Tom Reloaded

=== Compilation albums ===
- 2018: Sexy Boy... Best Of 1999-2018

=== Singles ===
List of singles, with selected chart positions, sales figures and certifications
Title	Year	Chart Positions			Info	Album
Title	Year	GER	AUT	SWI	Info	Album
"Voulez-vous Coucher Avec Moi" (featuring Ras-Ma-Taz)	1996	—	18	—	Released in 1996, but first appeared on the 2010 mini-album/remix album Reflections	Reflections
"Life Goes Up, Life Goes Down" (featuring Gino Gillian)	1997	—	—	—	Released in 1997, but first appeared on the 2010 mini-album/remix album Reflections	Reflections
"Dirty Talk" (featuring Gino Gillian)	1998	—	—	—	Released in 1998, but first appeared on the 2010 mini-album/remix album Reflections	Reflections
"Sex is a Thrill with the Pill" (featuring Gino Gillian)	1998	—	—	—		Peeping Tom
"Kids in America"	2000	—	—	—		Peeping Tom
"Do You Love Me"	2004	—	—	—		Sensuality
"Let Me Feel Your Sexappeal"	2007	—	—	—		Sensuality
"Sensuality"	2007	—	—	—		Sensuality
"Sex on the Phone"	2009	—	—	—	The radio version only appears on the bonus disc 2 of the album Peeping Tom Reloaded	Peeping Tom Reloaded
"Gimme (Safer Sex)" (featuring LayZee)	2010	—	—	—	The radio version only appears on the bonus disc 2 of the album Peeping Tom Reloaded	Peeping Tom Reloaded
"Poison Called Love"	2011	—	—	—		Russian Roulette
"Wild Beast"	2012	—	—	—		Russian Roulette
"Love is the Code"	2013	—	—	—		Russian Roulette
"Sexy Boy"	2018	—	—	—		Sexy Boy... Best Of 1999-2018
"—" denotes single, that failed to chart or was not released

=== Promotional Singles ===
List of promotional singles, with selected chart positions, sales figures and certifications
Title	Year	Chart Positions			Info	Album
Title	Year	GER	AUT	SWI	Info	Album
"Hanky Spanky" (featuring Gino Gillian)	1999	—	—	—		Peeping Tom
"Manga Maniac" (featuring Gino Gillian)	1999	—	—	—		Peeping Tom
"Fragile Love"	2006	—	—	—	Released in 2006 as the 2007 remix version. Original version appeared on the 1999 debut studio album Peeping Tom	Sensuality
"Voodoo Queen"	2008	—	—	—	The song only appears on the re-released remix version of the album, titled Sensuality - The Remix Album	Sensuality
"Love 2 Love"	2009	—	—	—		Sensuality
"—" denotes promotional single, that failed to chart or was not released
