= Die geilste Single der Welt =

Single by E-Rotic

from the album Greatest Tits – The Best of E-Rotic
- B-side: "Turn Me On, Sexual Madness, Remix"
- Released: 1998
- Genre: Eurodance
- Length: 3:58
- Label: Blow Up
- Songwriter(s): John O'Flynn
- Producer(s): David Brandes

E-Rotic singles chronology
"Turn Me On" (1997)	"Die geilste Single der Welt" (1998)	"Baby Please Me" (1998)

"Die geilste Single der Welt" (German for "The Horniest Single in the World" or "The Coolest Single in the World") is a song by German eurodance group E-Rotic. It is the first single from their greatest-hits compilation Greatest Tits. It is a megamix including "Fred Come to Bed", "Willy Use A Billy... Boy", "Fritz Love My Tits", "Sex on the Phone", and "Max Don't Have Sex With Your Ex". It is not to be confused with the song "E-Rotic Megamix" on the special edition of the album The Power of Sex, which excludes "Fritz Love My Tits", or the album Dancemania Presents E-Rotic Megamix, sometimes called E-Rotic Megamix.

== Track listing ==
1. Die geilste Single der Welt – Megamix (radio cut)
2. Die geilste Single der Welt – Megamix (extended version)
3. Sexual Madness
4. Turn Me On

== Notes ==
- The single cover is the same as on their next single "Baby Please Me".
