= Dancemania Presents E-Rotic Megamix =

Remix album by E-Rotic
- Released: 27 September 2000
- Genres: Electronic music Trance music Euro house
- Length: 74:00
- Language: English
- Label: EMI Music Japan
- Producer: David Brandes

E-Rotic Japan chronology
Gimme Gimme Gimme (2000)	Dancemania Presents E-Rotic Megamix	Sexual Healing (2001)

E-Rotic chronology
Gimme Gimme Gimme/Missing You (2000)	Dancemania Presents E-Rotic Megamix (2000)	Sex Generation (2001)

Dancemania Presents E-Rotic Megamix, or simply called E-Rotic Megamix is a remix album released in 2000 by German dance band E-Rotic.

== Content ==
The album consists of 20 remixes of previously released songs, five new songs ("Cat's Eye", "En Mon Coeur", "Move Me Baby", "Ooh Lalala" and "Test My Best"), and 1 remix of the new song "Cat's Eye". The tracks 1–25 are mixed into a non-stop megamix and track 26, the bonus track "Cat's Eye (Ventura Mix)", is a separate song. However, "Test My Best" later appeared on E-Rotic's 2001 studio album Sexual Healing, while the full versions of "Cat's Eye", "En Mon Coeur", "Move Me Baby" and "Ooh Lalala" can be found on their third compilation album "The Collection". "Cat's Eye" is a cover version of Anri's song of the same title, and "Gotta Get It Groovin'" was originally performed by the group IQ-Check, also produced by David Brandes and featuring Lyane Leigh's vocals. The megamix compiles songs from all previous major releases and both female vocalists, Lyane Leigh and Lydia Madajewski. While most of the remixed previously released songs are only slightly altered and kept their original eurodance style, the 5 new songs as well as the remix of the new song Cat's Eye are trance or J-Pop songs. The remixes of Oh Nick Please Not So Quick, Wild And Strong and Help Me Dr. Dick underwent more of a change and can be classified as house. No singles were released from the album.

== Track list ==
1. Turn Me On – 2:50
2. Dynamite – 2:33
3. Cat's Eye – 3:32
4. Sex on the Phone – 3:06
5. Gimme, Gimme, Gimme – 2:11
6. Do It All Night – 2:54
7. Fritz Love My Tits – 2:56
8. Willy Use a Billy... Boy – 3:22
9. Temple Of Love – 2:05
10. Help Me Dr. Dick – 1:51
11. Gotta Get It Groovin' – 2:13
12. Kiss Me – 2:20
13. Max Don't Have Sex With Your Ex – 2:20
14. In The Heat Of The Night – 2:46
15. Missing You – 2:53
16. Oh Nick Please Not So Quick – 2:15
17. Fred Come to Bed – 2:47
18. Get Away – 1:53
19. In The Dark Of The Night – 2:33
20. Wild And Strong – 1:54
21. The Winner Takes It All – 3:17
22. En Mon Coeur – 4:36
23. Move Me Baby – 4:02
24. Ooh Lalala – 3:04
25. Test My Best – 4:42

=== Bonus track ===
1. Cat's Eye (Ventura Mix) – 3:40
