= Sex on the Phone =

Single by E-Rotic

"Sex On The Phone"

Single by E-Rotic

from the album Sex Affairs
- B-side: "Remix"
- Released: 6 June 1995
- Length: 3:54 (album version); 2:45 (video); 3:06 (Dancemania presents E-ROTIC Megamix album version)
- Label: Dureco (Netherlands); Remixed Records (Sweden); EMI Music (France)
- Songwriters: David Brandes; John O'Flynn
- Producers: David Brandes; Felix J. Gauder; John O'Flynn

E-Rotic singles chronology
"Fred Come to Bed" (1995)	"Sex On The Phone" (1995)	"Willy Use a Billy... Boy" (1995)

Remixes cover

"Sex on the Phone" is a song recorded by German Eurodance project E-Rotic. It was released in June 1995 as the third single from their debut album, Sex Affairs (1995). As the title suggests it, the main theme of the song is phone sex. The single reached number six in the German Singles Chart and was ranked for 14 weeks. It was also a hit in Austria where it reached number two and totaled 14 weeks in the top 30. In other European countries, it achieved a minor success, failing the top 20 in most of them. The song was later included on E-Rotic's compilations Greatest Tits (The Best of) and Dancemania presents E-ROTIC Megamix.

In 2009, the song was covered by Lyane Leigh, the original singer of "Sex on the Phone", under her stage name S.E.X. Appeal, and was released as single.

== Music video ==
The music video for "Sex on the Phone" was directed by Zoran Bihac. It was A-listed on German music television channel VIVA in July 1995.

== Track listings ==
- CD maxi - Germany, Netherlands and Sweden
1. "Sex on the Phone" (radio edit) — 3:54
2. "Sex on the Phone" (extended version) — 6:06
3. "Sex on the Phone" (D1 remix) — 5:44
4. "Sex on the Phone" (D2 remix) — 5:51
- CD maxi - German Remixes
1. "Sex on the Phone" (the hotline remix) — 4:31
2. "Sex on the Phone" (the house remix) — 4:21
3. "Sex on the Phone" (the fast and hot sex Max remix) — 5:12
- 12" maxi - German Remixes
1. "Sex on the Phone" (the hotline remix) — 4:31
2. "Sex on the Phone" (the house remix) — 4:21
3. "Sex on the Phone" (the fast and hot sex Max remix) — 5:12
- 12" maxi - Germany
1. "Sex on the Phone" (extended version) — 6:06
2. "Sex on the Phone" (D1 remix) — 5:44
3. "Sex on the Phone" (D2 remix) — 5:51
- CD single - France
1. "Sex on the Phone" (radio edit) — 3:54
2. "Sex on the Phone" (extended version) — 6:06

== Credits ==
- Written by David Brandes and John O'Flynn
- Composed by David Brandes and John O'Flynn
- Arranged by Domenico Livrano, Felix J. Gauder and David Brandes, at Bros Studios / Rüssmann Studios / Why Headroom
- Produced by David Brandes, Felix J. Gauder and John O'Flynn
- Published by Cosima Music

== Charts ==
=== Weekly charts ===
Chart (1995)	Peak position
Austria (Ö3 Austria Top 40)	2
Belgium (Ultratop Flanders)	43
Europe (Eurochart Hot 100)	22
Finland (Suomen virallinen lista)	4
France (SNEP)	30
Germany (GfK)	6
Netherlands (Single Top 100)	48
Norway (VG-lista)	18
Sweden (Sverigetopplistan)	40
Switzerland (Schweizer Hitparade)	30

=== Year-end charts ===
Chart (1995)	Position
Austria (Ö3 Austria Top 40)	23
Germany (Media Control)	76

== S.E.X. Appeal version ==
"Sex on the Phone"

Single by S.E.X. Appeal
- B-side: "Remix"
- Released: 2009
- Genre: Vocal-Trance
- Length: 4:16; 3:40 (radio edit)
- Songwriters: David Brandes; John O'Flynn

S.E.X. Appeal singles chronology
"Love 2 Love"	"Sex on the Phone"	"Gimme (Safer Sex)"

In 2009, "Sex on the Phone" was covered by German trance project S.E.X. Appeal.

=== Track listings ===
- CD maxi
1. "Sex on the Phone" (radio edit) — 3:40
2. "Sex on the Phone" (Bootleggerz radio remix) — 3:38
3. "Sex on the Phone" (D.Mand radio remix) — 3:33
4. "Sex on the Phone" (album version) — 4:16
5. "Sex on the Phone" (Bootleggerz club version) — 5:55
6. "Sex on the Phone" (D.Mand club version) — 4:43
7. BONUS: "Sex on the Phone" (video clip for Mac and Windows)
- Digital download
1. "Sex on the Phone" (radio edit) — 3:40
2. "Sex on the Phone" (Bootleggerz radio remix) — 3:38
3. "Sex on the Phone" (D.Mand radio remix) — 3:33
4. "Sex on the Phone" (album version) — 4:16
5. "Sex on the Phone" (Bootleggerz club version) — 5:55
6. "Sex on the Phone" (D.Mand club version) — 4:43
