= E-Rotic Megamix =

E-Rotic Megamix may refer to:

- Dancemania Presents E-Rotic Megamix, a remix album by German eurodance project E-Rotic
  - a track from their album The Power of Sex
  - "Die geilste Single der Welt", which is a megamix by E-Rotic
