= Welcome to Tokyo =

Studio album by Shanadoo
- Released: December 1, 2006
- Recorded: September – October 2006
- Genres: Eurodance, J-pop, electronic
- Length: 48:20
- Labels: Icezone Music, avex trax
- Producer: David Brandes

Shanadoo chronology
| Welcome to Tokyo (2006) | The Symbol (2007) |

Limited Edition

Singles from Welcome To Tokyo
- 1. "King Kong" Released: June 16th, 2006; 2. "My Samurai" Released: September 15, 2006; 3. "Guilty of Love" Released: November 17th, 2006

Welcome To Tokyo is the debut album by Germany based J-Pop girl group Shanadoo. The album was released in 2006 to Germany and 2007 to Japan. The album featured the singles King Kong, My Samurai (a Japanese version of "Fred Come to Bed" by E-Rotic) and Guilty of Love (a Japanese version of "The Power of Sex" by E-Rotic).

== Information ==
The album was released in Germany in December 2006, although the band speaks Japanese natively the album was not released in Japan until two months after in February 2007. The album was a commercial success and put Shanadoo's name out across Germany. It peaked at #63 on the DE Alben charts

== Singles ==
1. "King Kong" was released as the lead single on June 16, 2006, in Germany, it was not released in Japan. The song is a cover of Hinoi Team's cover version of the song, which was originally recorded by E-Rotic. The music video on YouTube for the single showcased the group dancing in a pink room and also incorporates a ParaPara dance
2. "My Samurai" was released to Germany on September 15, 2006. The lyrics were written by John O'Flynn & Miyabi Sudo and uses the music to Fred Come to Bed by German Eurodance group E-Rotic. The music video on YouTube displays the girls dancing in a white room and a room with lights, while also flashing back and forth to a modern-day Samurai swinging his sword.
3. "Guilty of Love" was released as the 3rd and final single from the album. Released in Germany on November 17, 2006, the song is a Japanese language cover of E-Rotic's The Power of Sex. The song's lyrics were written by Ayaka Ichihashi and produced by David Brandes. The music video on YouTube shows the girls in a traditional Indian setting writing kanji in the sand with sticks. They are dressed in Indian garments and are singing inside temples and palaces. They are also shown in front of Japanese shrines wearing kimono.

== Track listing ==
There are three different versions of the album. The original German release, plus a Japanese edition and a Limited edition. The first thirteen tracks are the same for all versions of the album and are as follows.

| No. | Title | Writer(s) | Producer(s) | Length |
|---|---|---|---|---|
| 1. | "King Kong" | David Brandes, John O'Flynn, Goro Matsui | David Brandes, Felix J. Gauder | 3:45 |
| 2. | "Passion in Your Eyes" | Brandes, O'Flynn, Miyabi Sudo | Brandes | 3:59 |
| 3. | "Guilty of Love" | Brandes, O'Flynn, Ayaka Ichihashi | Brandes | 3:45 |
| 4. | "Ninja Tattoo" | Brandes, O'Flynn, Ichihashi | Brandes, Gauder | 3:21 |
| 5. | "My Samurai" | Brandes, O'Flynn, Sudo | Brandes, Gauder | 3:28 |
| 6. | "One Tear Ago" | Brandes, O'Flynn, Ichihashi | Brandes, Gauder | 3:43 |
| 7. | "Just a Little Flirt" | Brandes, O'Flynn, Sudo | Brandes, Gauder | 3:32 |
| 8. | "Give a Little Love" | Brandes, O'Flynn, Sudo | Brandes | 4:11 |
| 9. | "Konnichiwa" | Brandes, O'Flynn, Ichihashi | Brandes, Gauder | 3:42 |
| 10. | "It's Like An Anime" | Brandes, O'Flynn, Ichihashi | Brandes | 4:02 |
| 11. | "Wake Me" | Brandes, O'Flynn. Ichihashi | Brandes, Gauder | 3:18 |
| 12. | "Listen to the Rhythm" | Brandes, O'Flynn, Sudo | Brandes, Gauder | 3:30 |
| 13. | "Closer to Heaven" | Brandes, O'Flynn, Sudo | Brandes | 4:04 |
| Total length: | | | | 48:20 |

Japanese Edition Bonus Tracks
| No. | Title | Length |
|---|---|---|
| 14. | "My Samurai (Extended Version)" | 7:09 |
| 15. | "King Kong (Extended Version)" | 7:05 |
| 16. | "Guilty of Love (Extended Version)" | 6:02 |
| 17. | "Hypnotized" | 3:08 |

Limited Edition Bonus Tracks
| No. | Title | Length |
|---|---|---|
| 14. | "Hypnotized" | 3:08 |
| 15. | "Sayonara Blue" | 4:31 |
| 16. | "Heart to Heart" | 3:11 |
| 17. | "My Samurai (Extended Version)" | 7:09 |
| 18. | "King Kong (Extended Version)" | 7:05 |

== Personnel ==
Credits for Welcome To Tokyo adapted from album insert.

- Vocals: Junko Fukuda, Chika Shibuya, Manami Fuku, Marina Genda
- Producer: David Brandes & Felix J. Gauder
- Keyboards & Programming: Felix J. Gauder, Domenico Labarile, Domenico Livarno, Pit Loew & Gary Jones.
- Guitars: Markus Wienstroer & Manuel Lopez
- Mixer: Gary Jones & Bernie Staub
- Vocal Recording: Gary Jones, Tomoharu Shawada & Miyabi Sudo
- Photography: Michael Wilfling, Sascha Kramer, Manfred Esser
- Artwork: Jan Weskott

== Release history ==
| Country | Release date | Label(s) |
|---|---|---|
| Germany | December 1, 2006 | Icezone Music |
| Japan | February 28, 2007 | Avex Trax |
