= Reflections (S.E.X. Appeal album) =

EP by S.E.X. Appeal
- Released: 2010
- Genre: Vocal-Trance, Eurodance, Europop
- Language: English
- Label: 3H Music

Singles from Reflections
- 1. "Voulez-vous coucher avec moi" Released: 1996; 2. "Life Goes Up, Life Goes Down" Released: 1997; 3. "Dirty Talk" Released: 1998; 4. "Sex is a Thrill with the Pill" Released: 1998

Reflections is the first extended play (EP), and fourth major release overall, by German eurodance-trance project S.E.X. Appeal, released in 2010.

== Content ==
This EP features five different songs in total, with nine remixes of them and one B-Side. Even though it's S.E.X. Appeal's fourth album, released in 2010, it features only content recorded from 1996 and 1998, the first four singles, "Voulez-vous coucher avec moi", "Life Goes Up, Life Goes Down" and "Dirty Talk", which didn't appear on their debut album Peeping Tom or any of their previous albums before for unknown reasons and "Sex is a Thrill with the Pill", which appeared on Peeping Tom. All the official remixes of these four singles have been included, even the B-Side of "Sex is a Thrill with the Pill", the reggae fusion driven song called "Power of Love", excluding three singles' official instrumental versions.

== Track listing ==
1. Voulez-vous coucher avec moi (Radio Edit) - 3:53
2. Sex is a Thrill with the Pill (Radio Edit) - 3:48
3. Life Goes Up, Life Goes Down (Radio Edit) - 3:30
4. Voulez-vous coucher avec moi (Summer House Radio Mix) - 4:03
5. Dirty Talk (Radio Edit) - 3:38
6. Sex is a Thrill with the Pill (S.E.X.tended Version) - 5:42
7. Voulez-vous coucher avec moi (S.E.X.tended Version) - 6:27
8. Life Goes Up, Life Goes Down (Von Quadt Remix) - 3:49
9. Dirty Talk (Club Mix) - 5:24
10. Power of Love - 3:38
11. Voulez-vous coucher avec moi (Happy Club Mix) - 6:00
12. Life Goes Up, Life Goes Down (S.E.X.tended Version) - 5:03
13. Dirty Talk (S.E.X.tended Version) - 5:42
14. Voulez-vous coucher avec moi (Undergroove Mix) - 7:13
