= Billy Boy (disambiguation) =

Billy Boy may refer to:

- "Billy Boy", a traditional folk song
- Billy Boy (1954 film), a 1954 animated short cartoon by Metro-Goldwyn-Mayer and directed by Tex Avery
- Billy Boy (2017 film), a 2017 film directed by Bradley Buecker
- Billy Boy (wrestler) (born 1977), Mexican Luchador
- Billy Boy (novel), a golf-themed novel by Bud Shrake
- "Billy Boys", a loyalist song from Glasgow, Scotland
- Billy Boy Arnold (born 1935), American blues harmonica player, singer and songwriter
- Billy Boy on Poison, an American rock and roll band from Los Angeles
- BillyBoy* (born 1960), jewelry designer
- "Willy Use a Billy... Boy", a 1995 song recorded by German eurodance project E-Rotic
- "Take a Chance on Me", 1978 ABBA song with "Billy Boy" as a working title
