= Shanadoo =

Band

- Origin: Japan
- Genres: Dance; pop
- Years active: 2006–2014
- Labels: Icezone Music; Avex
- Spinoff of: Vivace
- Past members: Marina Kakitsu; Chika Takagi; Junko Fukuda; Manami Fuku
- Website: Shanadoo.com

Shanadoo (Japanese: シャナドゥー, Hepburn: Shanadū) were a Japanese dance and pop girl group. Produced in Germany and Japan, the band consisted of four members, lead singer Marina Kakitsu, along with Chika Takagi, Manami Fuku and Junko Fukuda. They were signed to Icezone Music and Avex.

== Band history ==
=== 2004–05: Formation and early years ===
Shanadoo was an all-female group made up of four young Japanese women from the Platinum Production agency. Chika Takagi, Manami Fuku and Junko Fukuda had already worked together before Shanadoo as a part of Avex Trax's promotional unit group, Vivace. Vivace's activities included work as race queens, bikini pin-up modeling and two Japanese recordings. One of them was their song "Flame love", which features as the last track on the 2004 compilation album Autobacs GT 2004 Series - Japan GT Championship. The other song, "On My Own", a cover version of Jade Donno's song of the same name, features on the non-stop megamix edition of the 2004 compilation album Autobacs GT 2004 Series - Japan GT Championship. Both songs also appear on their "Viva Vivace" video album and various other Avex Trax music compilations such as Girl's Box. Marina Kakitsu was added as lead vocalist to complete Shanadoo. The band went into production with noted Eurodance producer, David Brandes, whose credits include acts such as E-Rotic, Bad Boys Blue and Vanilla Ninja.

=== 2006–07: Welcome to Tokyo and The Symbol ===
Released on June 16, 2006, through one of Brandes' record labels, Icezone Music, Shanadoo's first single, "King Kong", a Japanese cover version of E-Rotic's single of the same name, was met with great success. Shanadoo's first works were exclusive to Germany and other European markets, such as Austria, until December 2006, when Avex announced that a then untitled debut album would be released on February 28, 2007, in Japan. Second and third follow up single releases were "My Samurai" and "Guilty of Love", both reworked Japanese cover versions of E-Rotic's singles "Fred Come to Bed" and "The power of sex". These became moderate hits in Germany as well. In December 2006, the band released their debut studio album Welcome to Tokyo in Germany. For this album, Brandes re-used 11 out of 13 tracks from previously released E-Rotic songs, one Bad Boys Blue cover and one original new song. In January 2007, it was announced by Icezone Music that Shanadoo's fourth single, to be released on March 9, 2007, in Germany, which became "Hypnotized", would be of original content to be released as their first single from their second studio album (Thus this song had also been included on a limited re-release version of their debut album Welcome to Tokyo). In October 5, the fifth single "Japanese Boy", a cover version of Scottish singer Aneka, was released and peaked at #23 in German Single chart. On December 7, the bands' sixth single "Think About" has been released along with their second studio album in the European market, titled The Symbol.

=== 2008–09: Move to Japan and Launch Party ===
Shanadoo remained active until 2008, with their activities and promotion shifting from Germany to Japan, where they were building a fan following by frequently performing at numerous music festivals and events. The band also announced in late 2008 a collaboration with Japanese clothing design house KIKS TYO to have their likeness appear on a designer T-shirt line set for release in early 2009. In December 2008, after a brief mention on Shanadoo's official blog in November 2008 of a new song "No Crime" being performed at recent live events, the Nintendo Wii video game Dance Dance Revolution Full Full Party was released in Japan featuring a short edit of the song. On January 29, 2009, an official soundtrack for the game was scheduled to be released that features a full version of the song. "No Crime" is produced by Japanese video game sound producer, Naoki Maeda, and is the first of Shanadoo's recorded works to not be produced by German producer Brandes. In 2009, the singles "Next Life" and the double A-Side "Love Space Ship/World's End Supernova" were released, followed by the third and final, Japanese produced, studio album entitled Launch Party, to be released November 25. In comparison to their first two, German produced, studio albums Welcome to Tokyo and The Symbol to be almost entire cover albums, primary covered of E-Rotic, Launch Party was their first album to feature almost all original content, except for two covers out of 14 songs in total, "Don't Call me Baby" by Madison Avenue and the "Dora, the Explorer" theme song by Joshua Sitron and Billy Straus.

=== 2010–14: Single releases and disbandment ===
In 2010, Shanadoo were featured in a release with DJ Yummy called "Paper Girl". In 2011, they released a single called "Shine". They also appeared in Germany for a concert at Animagic during the fall of 2011, their first time back in Germany since transferring to Avex in Japan in 2008. In 2012, Shanadoo announced that they would go on hiatus to focus on their solo careers. Takagi has become popular in Japan recently as DJ C'k. Around late 2013, a new Shanadoo fan page opened on Facebook and mentioned that they would post update on the members and future release updates, implying that Shanadoo had plans to return from hiatus sometime soon. However, in May 2014, it was officially announced by both Takagi and Kakitsu that the band is disbanding so that the members can focus on their solo careers and other projects.

=== 2016: Tenth Anniversary ===
In 2016, former member Chika, now under the name C'k, released two English covers of past Shanadoo hits in honor of their tenth anniversary since their debut. The songs she remade for this project are "My Samurai" and "Guilty Of Love".

== Members ==
- Marina "Genda" Kakitsu (源田マリナ) - 1.58m tall, born January 9, 1989; vocalist
- Junko Fukuda (福田淳子) - 1.53m tall, born February 19, 1984; vocalist
- Chika "Shibuya" Takagi (渋谷千賀) - 1.57m tall, born September 14, 1985; vocalist
- Manami Fuku (福愛美) - 1.60m tall, born October 14, 1986; vocalist

== Discography ==
=== Studio albums ===
List of studio albums, with selected chart positions, sales figures and certifications
Title	Album details	Chart position			Info
Title	Album details	GER	AUT	SWI	Info
Welcome to Tokyo	Released: December 1, 2006; Label: Icezone Music; Formats: CD	63	—	—	Released in Germany, on February 28, 2007, in Japan and as a limited edition on April 27, 2007, in Germany
The Symbol	Released: December 7, 2007; Label: Icezone Music; Formats: CD	—	—	—	Released in Germany
Launch Party	Released: November 25, 2009; Label: Avex; Formats: CD	—	—	—	Released in Japan
"—" denotes album failed to chart or was not released

=== Singles ===
List of singles, with selected chart positions, sales figures and certifications
Title	Year	Chart Positions			Info	Album
Title	Year	GER	AUT	SWI	Info	Album
"King Kong"	2006	15	14	—	Released on June 16, 2006, in Germany. Original song "King Kong" by E-Rotic.	Welcome to Tokyo
"My Samurai"	2006	17	15	—	Released on September 15, 2006, in Germany. Original song "Fred Come to Bed" by E-Rotic.	Welcome to Tokyo
"Guilty of Love"	2006	30	32	—	Released on November 17, 2006, in Germany. Original song "The power of sex" by E-Rotic.	Welcome to Tokyo
"Hypnotized"	2007	54	65	—	Released on March 9, 2007, in Germany. Also a bonus track on the limited edition of Welcome to Tokyo.	The Symbol
"Japanese Boy"	2007	23	—	—	Released on October 5, 2007, in Germany. Original song "Japanese boy" by Aneka.	The Symbol
"Think About"	2007	44	—	—	Released on December 7, 2007, in Germany.	The Symbol
"No Crime"	2008	—	—	—	Released on December 18, 2008. Available from Konami's Konami Music Full digital download service for Japanese cellphones. Also appeared on the "Dance Dance Revolution" soundtrack.	Launch Party
"Next Life"	2009	—	—	—	Released in 2009 in Japan.	Launch Party
"Love Space Ship"	2009	—	—	—	Released on September 30, 2009, as a double A-Side digital single with "World's End Supernova" in Japan.	Launch Party
"World's End Supernova"	2009	—	—	—	Released on September 30, 2009, as a double A-Side digital single with "Love Space Ship" in Japan.	Launch Party
"—" denotes single failed to chart or was not released

=== As featured artist ===
Title	Year	Chart position	Info	Album
Title	Year	GER	Info	Album
"Paper Girl" (Yummy featuring Shanadoo)	2010	—	Released 2010 as digital single in Japan.	D.I.S.K.
"—" denotes single failed to chart or was not released

=== Promotional singles ===
Title	Year	Chart position	Info	Album
Title	Year	GER	Info	Album
"Shine"	2011	—	Released on February 9, 2011, as digital single in Japan.	—N/a
"—" denotes single failed to chart or was not released

=== Notes of album track lists and original artists ===
Welcome to Tokyo

1. "King Kong" ("King Kong" by E-Rotic)
2. "Passion In Your Eyes" ("Shenandoah" by E-Rotic)
3. "Guilty Of Love" ("The power of sex" by E-Rotic)
4. "Ninja Tattoo" ("I'm over you" by E-Rotic)
5. "My Samurai" ("Fred come to bed" by E-Rotic)
6. "One Tear Ago" ("Is it you" by E-Rotic)
7. "Just A Little Flirt" ("It's Just a little flirt" by E-Rotic)
8. "Give A Little Love" ("Give a little love" by E-Rotic)
9. "Konnichiwa"
10. "It's Like An Anime" ("Ecstasy" by E-Rotic)
11. "Wake Me" ("Save me" by E-Rotic)
12. "Listen To The Rhythm" ("Willy use a Billy...Boy" by E-Rotic)
13. "Closer To Heaven" ("Baby don't miss me" by Bad Boys Blue)

The Symbol

1. "Think About"
2. "Lover On The Run" ("Lemmings on the run" by E-Rotic)
3. "Gotta Get It Groovin'" ("Gotta get it groovin'" by IQ-Check)
4. "Japanese Boy" ("Japanese Boy" by Aneka)
5. "Heart To Heart" ("Test my Best" by E-Rotic)
6. "Bonjour Tristesse" ("Dance with the Vamps" by E-Rotic)
7. "You Are My Daydream" ("I feel your Heartbeat" by E-Rotic)
8. "Hypnotized"
9. "Once She Gets Tired"
10. "From Time To Time" ("Rave me Dave" by E-Rotic)
11. "L.O.V.E." ("L.O.V.E. (Sex on the Beach)" by E-Rotic)
12. "Fly Me To Shanghai" ("Oh Nick please not so quick (Flute Version)" by E-Rotic)
13. "King Kong (Remix 2007)" ("King Kong" by E-Rotic)
14. "Japanese Boy (Extended Version)" ("Japanese boy" by Aneka)
15. "Think About (Extended Version)"

Launch Party

1. "Love Space Ship"
2. "Next Life"
3. "Yeah, Yeah, Yeah, Yeah"
4. "World's End Supernova"
5. "Sound Space Scope"
6. "Merry Time"
7. "Walk'in On"
8. "Real Intention"
9. "You Make Me"
10. "Don't Call Me Baby" ("Don't Call Me Baby" by Madison Avenue)
11. "Peaceful Morning"
12. "Carry On"
13. "Dora (Shanadoo Version)" ("Dora, the explorer" by Joshua Sitron & Billy Straus)
14. "Next Life (Caramel Pod Club Mix)"
15. "No Crime"
