= Fritz Love My Tits =

1996 single by E-Rotic

Single by E-Rotic

from the album The Power of Sex
- B-side: "Remix"
- Released: 28 May 1996
- Recorded: 1996
- Genre: Eurodance
- Length: 4:07
- Label: Blow Up (Germany); Dureco (Netherlands); Remixed Records (Sweden); EMI Music (France)
- Songwriters: David Brandes; John O'Flynn
- Producers: David Brandes; Felix J. Gauder; John O'Flynn

E-Rotic singles chronology
"Help Me Dr. Dick" (1996)	"Fritz Love My Tits" (1996)	"Gimme Good Sex" (1996)

"Fritz Love My Tits" is a song recorded by German Eurodance project E-Rotic. It was released in May 1996 as the third single from their second album The Power of Sex. The single reached number 1 in the Czech Republic. It was also a hit in Austria and Finland where it reached number 16 and number 2, respectively. And it also peaked at number 28 in Germany and number 35 in Switzerland.

== Music video ==
An animated music video for "Fritz Love My Tits" was directed by Zoran Bihać. A tiny space traveler named Fritz flies through space on his hoverboard equipped with a TV screen, where he sees a giant blonde, six-armed topless space woman wearing just a green g-string and green platform heels (as depicted in The Power of Sex album cover) on the screen, whom he falls in love with, and decides to find her. Fritz later sees on his screen that the space woman was kidnapped onto a blue breast-shaped spaceship and decides to save her. Fritz later lands onto the spaceship and figures out that the space woman was kidnapped by an evil villain named Max, a giant black alien with yellow eyes who kidnaps women across the galaxy and ties them up onto a platform in order to use their breasts as breast-shaped torpedoes as missiles to attack Earth. Fritz tries his best to fight off the villain and save the space woman but fails as Max swallows Fritz and spits him back to Earth. Max later ties up the giant space woman but the woman manages to escape. The space woman flies away and tries to find the protagonist on Earth in an urban city while Fritz is daydreaming. The space woman wakes Fritz up and takes him out of his apartment. Max later arrives close to Earth where Fritz and the space woman are residing. Fritz attaches dynamite to his hoverboard and flies all the way to Max's spaceship and succeeds in exploding both Max and the spaceship. Finally, Fritz comes back down to Earth to land on the space woman's breasts while smoking a cigar.

== Track listings ==
CD maxi - Europe

1. "Fritz Love My Tits" (Radio Edit) - 4:07
2. "Fritz Love My Tits" (Extended Version) - 5:42
3. "Fritz Love My Tits" (Club Version) - 5:37

CD maxi - European Remixes

1. "Fritz Love My Tits" (The Dance Remix) - 4:43
2. "Fritz Love My Tits" (The House Remix) - 4:33
3. "Fritz Love My Tits" (The Trance Remix) - 6:29

== Credits ==
- Written by David Brandes and John O'Flynn
- Composed by David Brandes and John O'Flynn
- Arranged by Domenico Livrano, Felix J. Gauder and David Brandes, at Bros Studios / Rüssmann Studios / Why Headroom
- Produced by David Brandes, Felix J. Gauder and John O'Flynn
- Published by Cosima Music

== Charts ==
Chart (1996)	Peak position
Austria (Ö3 Austria Top 40)	16
Czech Republic (IFPI CR)	1
Europe (Eurochart Hot 100)	64
Finland (Suomen virallinen lista)	2
Germany (Official German Charts)	28
Switzerland (Schweizer Hitparade)	35
