= Help Me Dr. Dick =

Single by E-Rotic

from the album The Power of Sex
- B-side: "Remix"
- Released: January 10, 1996
- Recorded: 1995
- Genre: Euro reggae
- Length: 3:42 (single/album version); 2:42 (video)
- Label: Intercord/Blow Up (Germany), Dureco (Netherlands), Remixed Records (Sweden), EMI Music (France)
- Songwriters: David Brandes, John O'Flynn
- Producers: David Brandes, Felix J. Gauder, John O'Flynn

E-Rotic singles chronology
"Willy Use a Billy... Boy" (1995)	"Help Me Dr. Dick" (1996)	"Fritz Love My Tits" (1996)

"Help Me Dr. Dick" is a song recorded by German Eurodance project E-Rotic. It was released on January 10, 1996, as the second single from their second album, The Power of Sex (1996). The single reached number 23 in Germany and was also a hit in Austria, Denmark, Finland and Hungary, where it reached number 18, five and three, respectively.

== Music video ==
An animated music video for "Help Me Dr. Dick" was directed by Zoran Bihać, animated by Andreas Hykade and produced at Studio Film Bilder GmbH. It depicts a female patient undergoing breast augmentation from the eponymous Dr. Dick, who is also shown performing surgery on several other patients. After receiving anesthesia, the female patient dreams of being rescued by Dr. Dick in various situations. At the end of the video, the woman is awakened from her surgery, but discovers that Dr. Dick mistakenly augmented her arms and gave the breast augmentation to a nearby male patient.

== Track listings ==
- CD maxi - Europe
1. "Help Me Dr. Dick" (Radio Edit) - 3:42
2. "Help Me Dr. Dick" (Extended Version) - 5:43
3. "Help Me Dr. Dick" (Club Version) - 4:57
4. "Help Me Dr. Dick" (Instrumental Version) - 3:42
- CD maxi - European Remixes
1. "Help Me Dr. Dick" (The First Aid Remix) - 5:57
2. "Help Me Dr. Dick" (Dr.'s Hospital Remix) - 5:05
3. "Help Me Dr. Dick" (The Emergency Remix) - 7:09

== Credits ==
- Written by: David Brandes, John O'Flynn
- Composed by: David Brandes, John O'Flynn
- Arranged by: Domenico Livrano, Felix J. Gauder and David Brandes, at Bros Studios / Rüssmann Studios / Why Headroom
- Produced by: David Brandes, Felix J. Gauder, John O'Flynn
- Published by: Cosima Music

== Charts ==
Chart (1996)	Peak position
Austria (Ö3 Austria Top 40)	18
Denmark (IFPI)	18
Europe (Eurochart Hot 100)	76
Finland (Suomen virallinen lista)	5
Germany (GfK)	23
Hungary (Mahasz)	3
