= Willy Use a Billy... Boy =

Single by E-Rotic

from the album The Power of Sex
- B-side: "Remix"
- Released: 4 October 1995
- Genre: Eurodance
- Length: 3:41
- Label: Blow Up (Germany); Dureco (Netherlands); Remixed Records (Sweden); EMI Music (France)
- Songwriters: David Brandes; John O'Flynn
- Producers: David Brandes; Felix J. Gauder; John O'Flynn

E-Rotic singles chronology
"Sex on the Phone" (1995)	"Willy Use a Billy... Boy" (1995)	"Help Me Dr. Dick" (1996)

"Willy Use a Billy... Boy" is a song recorded by German Eurodance project E-Rotic. It was released in October 1995 as the lead single from their second album, The Power of Sex (1996). The song, written and co-produced by David Brandes and John O'Flynn, is about safe sex, where Billy Boy is a brand of condoms from Germany that is also available in the UK. The single reached number eleven in Germany and it was also a hit in Austria and Finland, where it reached number five. Additionally, it was a top-20 hit in Switzerland.

== Music video ==
The accompanying music video for "Willy Use a Billy... Boy" was directed by Zoran Bihać. It was A-listed on German music television channel VIVA in November 1995.

== Track listings ==
- CD maxi - Europe
1. "Willy Use A Billy ... Boy" (Radio Edit) - 3:41
2. "Willy Use A Billy ... Boy" (Extended Version) - 6:37
3. "Willy Use A Billy ... Boy" (Safe The Sex Re-Max) - 5:37
4. "Willy Use A Billy ... Boy" (Instrumental) - 3:40
- CD maxi - European Remixes
1. "Willy Use A Billy ... Boy" (The House Remix) - 6:03
2. "Willy Use A Billy ... Boy" (The Dance Remix) - 4:44
3. "Willy Use A Billy ... Boy" (Willy's Latex Remix) - 5:07

== Credits ==
- Written by David Brandes and John O'Flynn
- Composed by David Brandes and John O'Flynn
- Arranged by Domenico Livrano, Felix J. Gauder and David Brandes, at Bros Studios / Rüssmann Studios / Why Headroom
- Produced by David Brandes, Felix J. Gauder and John O'Flynn
- Published by Cosima Music

== Charts ==
Chart (1995)	Peak position
Austria (Ö3 Austria Top 40)	5
Europe (Eurochart Hot 100)	30
Finland (Suomen virallinen lista)	5
Germany (Official German Charts)	11
Sweden (Sverigetopplistan)	51
Switzerland (Schweizer Hitparade)	20

== Certifications ==
Region	Certification	Certified units/sales
Germany (BVMI)	Gold	250,000^{^}
^{^} Shipments figures based on certification alone.
