= E-Rotic =

German Eurodance duo act by David Brandes

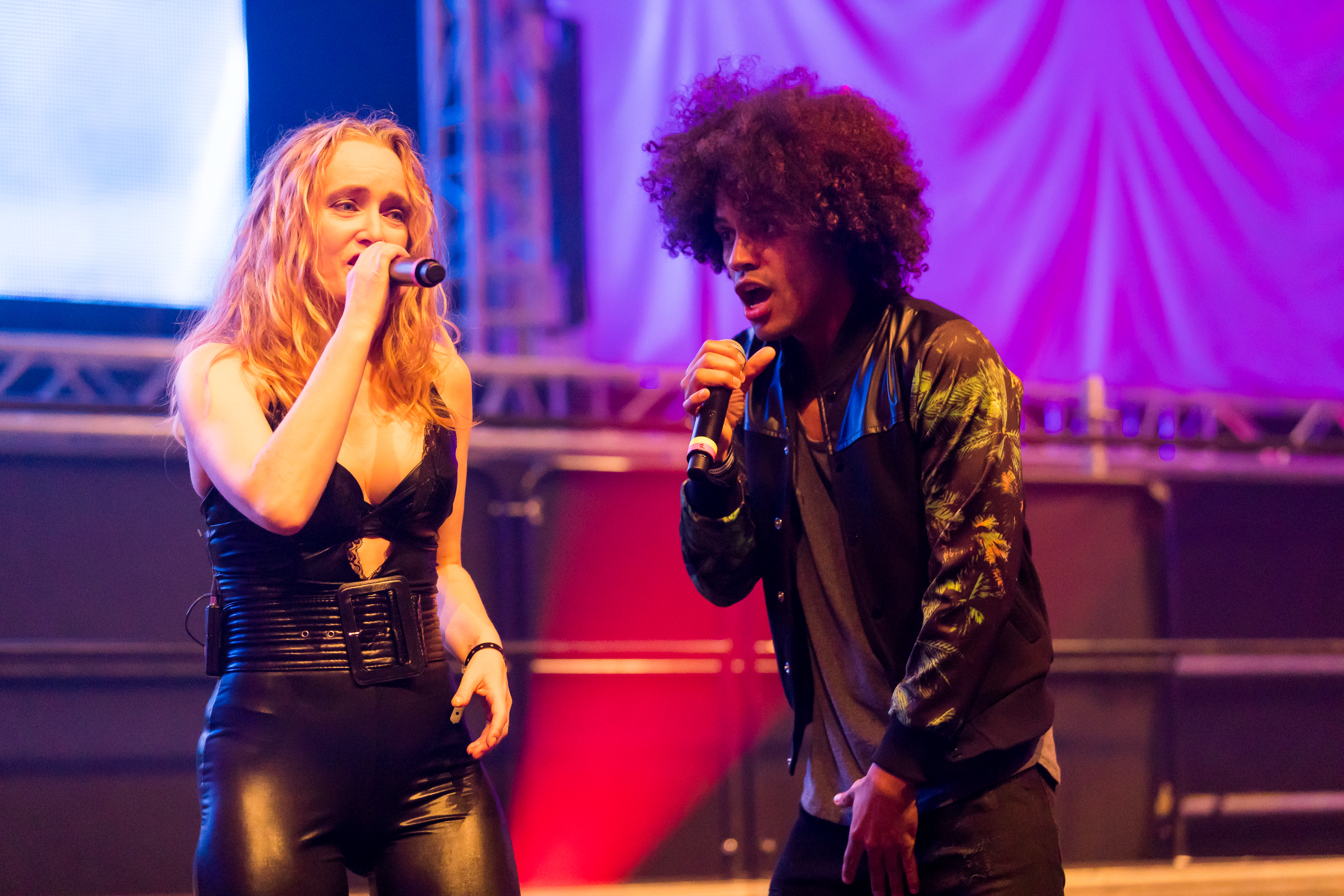
- Lyane Leigh (left) and Stephen Appleton (right) in November 2016.

Background information
- Also known as: e.R, Jenn and C., Missing Heart, IQ-Check
- Origin: Brüggen, Germany
- Genre: Eurodance
- Years active: 1994–2003, 2014–present
- Labels: Intercord; BMG; Avex; Epic
- Members: Lyane Hegemann; David Brändle; James Allan
- Past members: Richard Allen Smith; Marcus Thomas; Jeanette Macchi-Meier; Terrence D'Arby; Ché Jouaner; Yasemin Baysal; Lydia Pockaj; Robert Spehar; Stephen Appleton; Ricardo Brownn
- Website: www.e-rotic-music.com

E-Rotic is a Eurodance duo act formed in 1994 by German record producer David Brandes. The act is best known in Europe for the hits "Max Don't Have Sex With Your Ex" and "Fred Come to Bed". E-Rotic originally consisted of German born singer Lyane Leigh (real name Liane Hegemann) and American rapper Richard Allen Smith (a.k.a. Ras-Ma-Taz). The act is known for its extensive use of sexual themes in its songs and music videos.

== Band history ==
=== 1994–95: Formation and Sex Affairs ===
Brandes knew Leigh from their Xanadu days, active from 1989 to 1992, where they were both members and one half of the group. In 1994, Brandes released a solo song "Helpless Dancer" with Leigh on guest vocals, before American-born Ras-Ma-Taz joined them to create E-Rotic. Together they scored the charts with their first three chart topping singles "Max Don't Have Sex With Your Ex", which peaked #45 in the UK Singles Chart and #4 in the Dutch Single Chart, "Fred Come to Bed", #3 in the German Single Chart, and "Sex on the Phone", #2 in Austria, followed by their debut studio album Sex Affairs. Next to E-Rotic, Brandes continued, forming other dance projects, such as Apanachee in 1995 with Lydia Madajewski on vocals, who would later also become E-Rotic's studio lead singer in 2000.

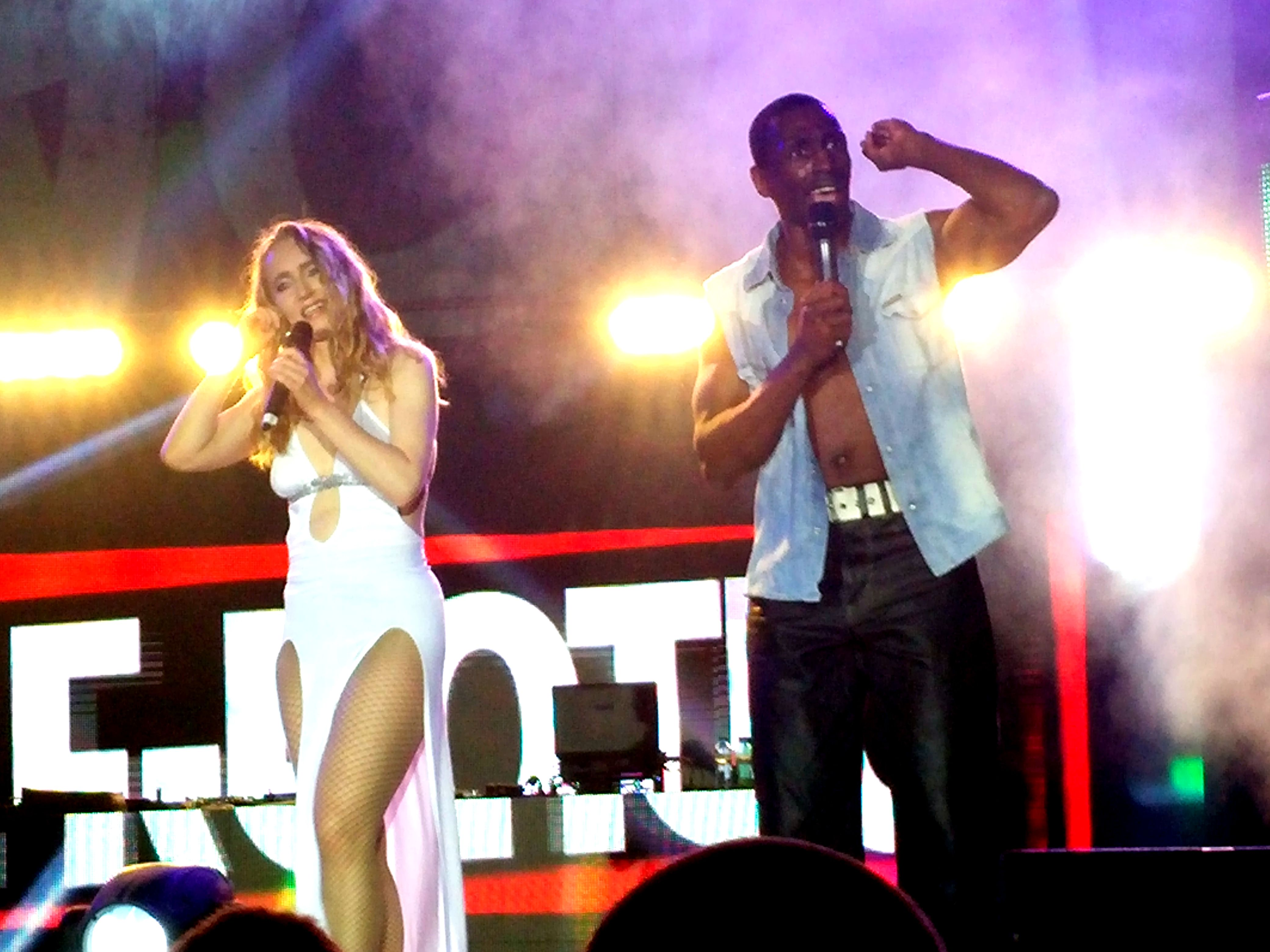
E-Rotic during I Love 90s Show, Live on Stage at Winter Palace, Sofia, Bulgaria, 2015–5–9. Lyane Leigh (left) and James Allan (right).

=== 1996–1997: The Power of Sex, Sexual Madness and departure of Raz-Ma-Taz ===
After the fourth single release "Willy Use a Billy... Boy", released in 1995 and peaked #5 in Austria, later in November 1995, both members left the band, due to a disagreement between Leigh and producer Brandes, who were quickly replaced by artists Jeane (Jeanette Macchi-Meier) and briefly Terence D'Arby (not to be confused with Terence Trent D'Arby), who himself again was replaced by Ché Jouaner. Thus it has been later revealed, that Brandes was the rapper on all E-Rotic releases, except on the first album, where he shared raps with Raz-Ma-Taz, such on "Take My Love", and Leigh still had to continue to provide vocal work for E-Rotic's four follow up studio albums The Power of Sex, Sexual Madness, the Abba cover album Thank You for the Music until 1999 to the Kiss Me studio album due to her contract. Also, raps on their first single "Max Don't Have Sex With Your Ex" were not done by Smith or Brandes, but instead were done by Marcus Thomas (aka Deon Blue) who would later join Pharao. Meanwhile, Leigh, and Ras-Ma-Taz, formed their own band S.E.X. Appeal in 1996. "He promised me a lot of things during my E-Rotic time, but never was willing to keep his promises. One of these promises was to produce a mixed video, with both cartoon and real people. We were never shown in the videos and so we had problems with our concerts, cause no-one really knew us as persons," Leigh revealed. On 27 June 1996, the group's second studio album The Power of Sex was released, preceded by the latter mentioned lead single "Willy Use a Billy... Boy" and followed by the singles "Help Me Dr. Dick", "Fritz Love My Tits" and "Gimme Good Sex", all becoming moderate chart hits, peaking at #18, #16 and #3 in Austria respectively. In 1996, E-Rotic were featured in the supergroup, called "Love Message", on the same titled, Masterboy-produced charity single "Love Message". They also appeared on the Queen tribute compilation album Queen Dance Traxx, with the song "Who Wants to Live Forever", which also saw a promotional release. The tribute album also featured another Queen song "We Are The Champions", recorded with all artists, who participated on Queen Dance Traxx as a supergroup labeled as "Acts United". In 1997, the studio albums "Sexual Madness" and the ABBA cover CD Thank You for the Music was released with its single releases "Turn Me On", which peaked at #7 in Finland, "Thank You for the Music" and "The Winner Takes It All". The album Thank You for the Music was released under the artist name "Jenn and C." in France. Ironically the music video for "Gimme Good Sex" was also the first one, not being a comic video, but still it never aired and was banned from music channels because of being too controversial for its sexual content, thus Leigh, alongside Ras-Ma-Taz, left the band earlier, because she wanted to be shown in music videos.

=== 1998–1999: Greatest Tits, Kiss Me and departure of Leigh ===
In 1998, E-Rotic have released their first Greatest Hits compilation album titled Greatest Tits - The Best of E-Rotic, along with the single "Baby Please Me" and the megamix "Die geilste Single der Welt" (German for "The Horniest Single in the World") to promote the album in Germany. In 1999, their second and final single from Sexual Madness, called "Don't Say We're Through", was released and later E-Rotic tried to enter the Eurovision Song Contest 2000 representing Germany but ended in sixth place in the pre-selection with the single "Queen of Light". This was the only time, where Macchi-Meier had to perform and sing live, when she was always lip syncing Leigh's and later Madajewski's singing parts on live shows. The song was later added on E-Rotic's sixth studio album Gimme, Gimme, Gimme and on Missing Hearts debut studio album Mystery (labeled as Missing Heart), in 2000. After that, E-Rotic focused more on the Japanese music market, where they kept more popular when the interest in Eurodance music in Europe waned at the end of the 1990s. In 1999, the fifth studio album Kiss Me was released in Japan with the three singles "Oh Nick Please Not So Quick", "Kiss Me" and "Mambo No. Sex", which all failed to chart. The latter mentioned single, was released on the later released German edition of Kiss Me, retitled Mambo No. Sex with a different track list and cover art leaned on the success of Lou Bega's "Mambo No. 5" at that time. The release of Kiss Me/Mambo No. Sex also marks the final with Leigh on vocals, who were replaced by Madajewski later in 2000.

=== 2000–2001: Gimme, Gimme, Gimme, Sexual Healing and Sex Generation ===
Between 2000 and 2001, three studio albums had been released in Japan, titled Gimme, Gimme, Gimme, Sexual Healing and Sex Generation with the singles "Gimme, Gimme, Gimme", "Missing You", "Don't Make Me Wet", "L.O.V.E. (Sex on the Beach)", "Billy Jive (With Willy's Wife)" and "King Kong", all with limited success. Also the two compilation albums, titled "Dancemania Presents E-Rotic Megamix", a megamix, and "The Very Best of E-Rotic" was released in Japan respectively. The albums Sex Generation and Gimme, Gimme, Gimme were also released in Europe, with the latter retitled Missing You with the same track list, except replacing the song "Gimme, Gimme, Gimme" with the title track "Missing You". Macchi-Meier left E-Rotic in 2001, briefly replaced by the next stage performer Yasemin Baysal, previously of the group Das Modul.

=== 2002–2003: Cocktail E-Rotic and Total Recall ===
However, Baysal and Jouaner left E-Rotic in 2002, and instead of replacing her with a new stage performer, this time the real studio singer Lydia Madajewski (Lydia Pockaj), who had been providing vocals since Leigh's departure in 1999, had been introduced to face E-Rotic. She has been joined by the stage performer Robert Spehar. In 2002, they released the group's ninth studio album Cocktail E-Rotic, the third compilation album titled The Collection and in 2003, the remix album Total Recall, all in Japan. The remix album has also been released in European territories with a different track list including new mixes. In 2002 a promotional single "Mi Amante" (Spanish for "My Lover") was released, labeled as e.R. In 2003, a new version of their very first single "Max Don't Have Sex With Your Ex" (2003 Dance Mix) was released to promote the remix album Total Recall. Cocktail E-Rotic saw one promotional single release, "Heartbreaker", which gained some radio airplay in Japan and ranked #1 on a Japanese radio chart. After that, E-Rotic went on an indefinite hiatus and both members, Madajewski and Spehar, left the band.

=== 2004–2013: Hiatus ===
Most former band members retired from the music scene. Brandes continued to produce for other artists and even reused dozens of E-Rotic songs for the Japanese girlgroup Shanadoo for their albums Welcome to Tokyo and The Symbol. Shanadoo project discontinued in 2014. Leigh continues her solo project S.E.X. Appeal. In 2006, an upcoming studio album, entitled Lust 4 Life (refers to the Fancy solo song title "D.I.S.C.O. (Lust for Life)", recorded back in 1999 with Leigh on guest vocals), was rumored and turned out to be false. Also in 2008, it had been rumored, that E-Rotic would release a new track, a cover of Vanilla Ninja's track "Liar", which was also produced by Brandes.

=== 2014–present: Return of Leigh, Level Up and The Hits ===
In December 2014, original E-Rotic lead singer Leigh confirmed that E-Rotic would come back and that she would return as the vocalist of the group again alongside a new rapper, Stephen Appleton. She also confirmed that E-Rotic planned to release a new best of album with re-recorded past hits and brand new E-Rotic songs to be released sometime in 2015. The group would be managed and produced by Icezone Music. The official website appeared to be under maintenance and a new official Facebook page was launched.

On 4 March 2016, E-Rotic released the single "Video Starlet", which included another song called "Murder Me".

On 20 September 2024, E-Rotic released their first studio album in over twenty years, Level Up. It was supported by the singles "Murder Me '21", "Head Over Heels", "Heaven Can Wait", "My Heart is Ticking Like a Bomb", "You Hooked Me Up", "Let's Get It Started", and "Out of My Life". Simultaneously, the group also released The Hits, a compilation album of their most notable songs spanning their entire history, including a re-recorded version of "Sex On The Phone".

== Artistry ==
=== Music ===
E-Rotic's music is a mix of dance and pop music with eurodance, which was very famous and popular in Europe, Oceania and South America at that time. The style of eurodance was dance music with a female singer and a male rapper to follow a traditional verse-chorus structure. Through the fact, that Brandes produced several dance projects with Leigh and Madajewski on vocals, such as Missing Heart, Apanachee or IQ-Check, their sound led to be very similar and reminiscent to E-Rotic's sound. Also, Leigh's early eurodance works with her project S.E.X. Appeal, then with rapper Raz-Ma-Taz, such as "Sex is a Thrill with the Pill", were very reminiscent of E-Rotic's sexual topics, music videos, lyrics and sound. That's also a reason, why some songs have been released with the same cast but under different stage names, such as "Helpless Dancer" (labeled as just David Brandes feat. Lyane Leigh), "Gotta Get It Groovin'" as IQ-Check (Brandes & Leigh), "Queen of Light" as E-Rotic but also as Missing Heart (Brandes & Madajewski) or "Mi Amante" as e.R. (Brandes & Madajewski). In particular, the album Thank You for the Music was released under the artist name "Jenn and C." in France. For events, promotion and cover arts, also Leigh often credits her project as "S.E.X. Appeal (EX) E-Rotic" for a better recognition. E-Rotic are best known for Eurodance tracks like "Max Don't Have Sex With Your Ex", "Fred Come to Bed" and "Sex on the Phone". Although there are also tracks from other genres featured, such as ballads like "Wild Love", "Final Heartbreak" or "The Power of Sex" and reggae fusion inspired tracks like "Come on Make Love to Me", "Help Me Dr. Dick" or "Gimme Good Sex" and the Mambo/Jive-driven "Mambo No. Sex". These tracks do not belong to the Europop genre.

=== Public image ===
E-Rotic are known for a tendency to make thought-provoking cartoon-animated music videos, which would air on VIVA Germany, and comic cover arts that fit the songs they represent. Due to the controversial disagreement between Leigh, who wanted to be shown in music videos, and producer Brandes, E-Rotic ironically later made some live action video clips and cover arts, such as the music videos for "Gimme Good Sex", "The Winner Takes it All" or "Kiss Me" and covers for the Thank You for the Music and Kiss Me/Gimme, Gimme, Gimme eras. However, for later releases like "Sexual Healing", "Sex Generation" and "Cocktail E-Rotic", they returned to all full comic music videos and cover arts. E-Rotic are also well known for having rhyming song titles about particular people like Max, Fred, Fritz, Sam or Willy on "Max Don't Have Sex With Your Ex", "Fred Come to Bed", "Willy Use a Billy... Boy", "Fritz Love My Tits", "Oh Nick Please Not So Quick", "Molly Dolly (Loves Her Lolly)", "Ralph, Don't Make Love by Yourself", "Veejay the DJ", "Test My Best", "Rave Me Dave", "Gimme Your Jimmy" or "Billy Jive (With Willy's Wife)". Because of the full comic arts in music videos and CD releases, the members were barely recognized. The band has been presented by numerous of stage performers, the four singers Lyane Leigh, Jeane, Yasemin Baysal and Lydia Madajewski and the seven rappers Raz-Ma Taz, Terence D'Arby, Ché Jouaner, Robert Spehar, Stephen Appleton, James Allan and Ricardo Brownn (not to be confused with Kurupt). However, Brandes later revealed and confirmed that the only two studio singers were Leigh and Madajewski, and the only rappers were actually himself, occasionally alongside Raz-Ma-Taz or Deon Blue.

== Members ==
Recording artists:

- Singer: Lyane Leigh (Liane Hegemann) (1994–1999, 2014–present) (original first studio singer)
- Singer: Lydia Madajewski (Lydia Pockaj) (1999–2003) (second studio singer)
- Rapper: Raz-Ma-Taz (Richard Allen Smith) (1994–1995) (occasional original first studio rapper, on "Take My Love" only)
- Rapper: David Brandes (David Brändle) (1994–present) (brainchild behind the project, also original studio rapper, who stayed in the background)
- Rapper: Deon Blue (Marcus Thomas) (1994) (rapper on "Max Don't Have Sex With Your Ex" only)

Stage performers:

- Singer: Lyane Leigh (Liane Hegemann) (1994–1995, 2014–present) (original first stage performer)
- Singer: Jeanette "Jeane" Christensen (Jeanette Macchi-Meier) (1995–2001) (second stage performer, who only sang Queen of Light live at the Eurovision Song Contest 2000 pre-selection)
- Singer: Yasemin Baysal (2001–2002) (third stage performer)
- Singer: Lydia Madajewski (Lydia Pockaj) (2002–2003) (fourth stage performer)
- Rapper: Raz-Ma-Taz (Richard Allen Smith) (1994–1995) (original first stage performer)
- Rapper: Terence D'Arby (1995–1996) (occasional second stage performer)
- Rapper: Ché Jouaner (1996–2002) (third stage performer)
- Rapper: Robert Spehar (2002–2003) (fourth stage performer)
- Rapper: Stephen Appleton (2014–2019) (fifth stage performer)
- Rapper: James Allan (2014–2020, 2022–present) (sixth and eighth stage performer)
- Rapper: Ricardo Brownn (2018–2022) (seventh stage performer)

== Discography ==
=== Studio albums ===
Title	Album details	Peak chart positions						Certifications
Title	Album details	GER	AUT	FIN	JPN	NLD	SWI	Certifications
Sex Affairs	Released: 29 May 1995; Label: Intercord (Blow Up); Formats: CD, LP, Cassette, Streaming	15	15	1	45	74	26	FIN: Platinum; JPN: Gold
The Power of Sex	Released: 27 June 1996; Label: Intercord (Blow Up); Formats: CD, LP, Cassette, Streaming	47	18	2	48	—	18	FIN: Platinum; JPN: Gold
Sexual Madness	Released: 13 May 1997; Label: Intercord (Blow Up); Formats: CD, LP, Cassette, Streaming	—	—	6	32	—	—	
Thank You for the Music	Released: 17 October 1997; Label: EMI (Blow Up); Formats: CD, LP, Cassette, Streaming	93	—	—	37	—	—	
Kiss Me	Released: 15 November 1999; Label: Sony (Jupiter); Formats: CD, LP, Cassette, Streaming	—	—	—	30	—	—	
Gimme, Gimme, Gimme	Released: 17 April 2000; Label: Sony (Jupiter); Formats: CD, Cassette, Streaming	—	—	—	27	—	—	
Sexual Healing	Released: 9 May 2001; Label: Intercord; Formats: CD, Cassette, Streaming	—	—	—	45	—	—	
Sex Generation	Released: 26 November 2001; Label: E-Park Music (Rough Trade); Formats: CD, Cassette, Streaming	—	—	—	90	—	—	
Cocktail E-Rotic	Released: 9 July 2003; Label: Avex Trax; Formats: CD, Cassette, Streaming	—	—	—	—	—	—	
Level Up	Released: 27 September 2024; Label: BROS Music; Formats: CD, LP, Streaming	—	—	—	—	—	—	
"—" denotes studio albums which were not released in that country or failed to chart.

"Oh Nick Please Not So Quick" (1999)
A typical 1990s piece by E-Rotic contained a Eurohouse-style instrumental verse, a rap verse by a male performer, and a chorus by the female vocalist.

=== Remix albums ===
- 2000: Dancemania Presents E-Rotic Megamix (27 September 2000)
- 2003: Total Recall (5 February 2003, re-released on 8 September 2011)

=== Compilation albums ===
- 1998: Greatest Tits – The Best of E-Rotic
- 2001: The Very Best of E-Rotic
- 2002: The Collection
- 2024: "The Hits"

=== Singles ===
Title	Year	Peak chart positions										Certifications	Album
Title	Year	GER	AUT	BEL (FL)	FIN	FRA	NLD	NOR	SWE	SWI	UK	Certifications	Album
"Max Don't Have Sex With Your Ex"	1994	7	12	8	15	20	4	—	—	14	45	GER: Gold	Sex Affairs
"Fred Come to Bed"	1995	3	5	11	6	18	12	—	30	6	90	GER: Gold	Sex Affairs
"Sex on the Phone"	1995	6	2	43	10	30	—	18	40	30	—		Sex Affairs
"Willy Use a Billy... Boy"	1995	11	5	—	5	—	—	—	51	20	—	GER: Gold	The Power of Sex
"Help Me Dr. Dick"	1996	23	18	—	5	—	—	—	—	—	—		The Power of Sex
"Fritz Love My Tits"	1996	28	16	—	2	—	—	—	—	35	—		The Power of Sex
"Gimme Good Sex"	1996	—	—	—	17	—	—	—	—	—	—		The Power of Sex
"Turn Me On"	1997	—	—	—	7	—	—	—	—	—	—		Sexual Madness
"Thank You for the Music" (Note: "Thank You for the Music" was labeled as "Jenn and C." for the French release.)	1997	—	—	—	—	—	—	—	—	—	—		Thank You for the Music
"The Winner Takes It All"	1997	84	—	—	—	—	—	—	—	—	—		Thank You for the Music
"Baby Please Me"	1998	—	—	—	—	—	—	—	—	—	—		Greatest Tits – The Best of E-Rotic
"Don't Say We're Through"	1999	—	—	—	—	—	—	—	—	—	—		Sexual Madness
"Oh Nick Please Not So Quick"	1999	—	—	—	—	—	—	—	—	—	—		Kiss Me
"Kiss Me"	1999	—	—	—	—	—	—	—	—	—	—		Kiss Me
"Mambo No. Sex" (Note: "Mambo No. Sex" was released on the German edition of Kiss Me, retitled Mambo No. Sex.)	1999	—	—	—	—	—	—	—	—	—	—		Kiss Me
"Gimme, Gimme, Gimme"	2000	—	—	—	—	—	—	—	—	—	—		Gimme, Gimme, Gimme
"Queen of Light" (Note: "Queen of Light" also appeared on the debut studio album Mystery by and labeled as Missing Heart.)	2000	—	—	—	—	—	—	—	—	—	—		Gimme, Gimme, Gimme
"Missing You"	2000	—	—	—	—	—	—	—	—	—	—		Gimme, Gimme, Gimme
"Don't Make Me Wet"	2000	—	—	—	—	—	—	—	—	—	—		Gimme, Gimme, Gimme
"L.O.V.E. (Sex on the Beach)" (Note: "L.O.V.E. (Sex on the Beach)" was also released as part of the Dancemania X9 compilation.)	2001	—	—	—	—	—	—	—	—	—	—		Sexual Healing
"Billy Jive (With Willy's Wife)"	2001	—	—	—	—	—	—	—	—	—	—		Sex Generation
"King Kong"	2001	—	—	—	—	—	—	—	—	—	—		Sex Generation
"Mi Amante" (Note: "Mi Amante" saw a promotional release labeled as e.R.)	2002	—	—	—	—	—	—	—	—	—	—		Sex Generation
"Max Don't Have Sex With Your Ex 2003"	2003	—	—	—	—	—	—	—	—	—	—		Total Recall
"Video Starlet"	2016	109	—	—	—	—	—	—	—	—	—		Level Up
"Mr. Mister"	2018	—	—	—	—	—	—	—	—	—	—		Level Up
"Max Don't Have Sex with Your Ex – Reboot 21"	2020	—	—	—	—	—	—	—	—	—	—		Non-album single
"Murder Me '21"	2021	—	—	—	—	—	—	—	—	—	—		Level Up
"Head Over Heels"	2021	—	—	—	—	—	—	—	—	—	—		Level Up
"Heaven Can Wait"	2021	—	—	—	—	—	—	—	—	—	—		Level Up
"My Heart Is Ticking Like a Bomb"	2023	—	—	—	—	—	—	—	—	—	—		Level Up
"Maxxx" (with Molow and Des3ett)	2024	—	—	—	—	—	—	—	—	—	—		Level Up
"The Winner Takes It All“ (New version)	2024	—	—	—	—	—	—	—	—	—	—		Non-album single
"You Hooked Me Up“	2024	—	—	—	—	—	—	—	—	—	—		Level Up
"Let's Get It Startet“	2024	—	—	—	—	—	—	—	—	—	—		Level Up
"Out Of My Life"	2024	—	—	—	—	—	—	—	—	—	—		Non-album single
"—" denotes singles which were not released in that country or failed to chart.

=== Promotional singles ===
Title	Year	Peak chart positions	Album
Title	Year	GER	Album
"Who Wants to Live Forever"	1996	—	Queen Dance Traxx
"Die geilste Single der Welt"	1998	—	Greatest Tits – The Best of E-Rotic
"Max Don't Have Sex with Your Ex 2003"	2003	86	Total Recall
"—" denotes promotional single which were not released in that country or failed to chart.

=== Featured singles ===
Title	Year	Peak chart positions
Title	Year	GER
"Love Message" (with Masterboy, Fun Factory, Mr. President, Scooter and Worlds Apart)	1996	4

=== Video games ===
E-Rotic has a total of 9 songs which appear in the Dance Dance Revolution arcade series. Two of these are also found in the Dancing Stage series and the StepManiaX arcade game, with the latter game adding a lyrics advisory to these songs. Another four songs are common to Dance Dance Revolution and StepManiaX, and of these, only "Turn Me On" carries a lyrics advisory.

E-Rotic has a total of 4 songs which appear in the In the Groove series. The song "Queen of Light" is also found in the StepManiaX arcade game, with no lyrics advisory.

Song	Arcade game									Lyrics advisory	StepManiaX availability
Song	2000	3rd	Euro	4th	5th	Euro2	ITG	ITG2	SMX	Lyrics advisory	StepManiaX availability
"Kiss Me (KCP Remix)"	Yes										
"Temple of Love" (Note: The Dance Dance Revolution series features the original version of this song, while StepManiaX features the uncredited remix from Dancemania Presents E-Rotic Megamix.)	Yes								Yes	–	March 29, 2021
"Do It All Night"		Yes	Yes	Yes					Yes	Yes	February 26, 2021
"Gimme Gimme Gimme" (Note: "Gimme Gimme Gimme" premiered in DDR 3rdMix Plus, while "Cat's Eye (Ventura Mix)" premiered in DDR 4thMix Plus.)		3rdMix Plus only		Yes	Yes						
"Oh Nick Please Not So Quick"		Yes		Yes							
"Turn Me On" (Note: The Dance Dance Revolution series features the Heavenly Mix of this song, while StepManiaX features the original version.)		Yes		Yes					Yes	Yes	August 2, 2021
"Cat's Eye (Ventura Mix)"				4thMix Plus only	Yes						
"In the Heat of the Night"				Yes	Yes				Yes	–	April 30, 2021
"Test My Best"					Yes	Yes			Yes	Yes	May 28, 2021
"Lemmings on the Run"							Yes	Yes	Yes	–	November 16, 2022
"Touch Me"							Yes	Yes			
"Queen of Light" (Note: For In the Groove and In the Groove 2, "Queen of Light" is credited to Missing Heart.)							Yes	Yes	Yes	–	June 28, 2021
"Charlene" (Note: For In the Groove and In the Groove 2, "Charlene" is credited to Missing Heart.)							Yes	Yes	Yes	–	February 26, 2021
"Ooh Lalala"									Yes	–	July 26, 2022
