= Sensuality (album) =

Studio album by S.E.X. Appeal
- Released: 2007
- Recorded: 2004–2007
- Genre: Vocal-Trance, Eurodance, Europop
- Length: 51:38
- Language: English
- Label: 3H Music

S.E.X. Appeal chronology
Peeping Tom (1999)	Sensuality (2007)	Russian Roulette (2012)

Singles from Sensuality
- 1. "Do You Love Me" Released: 2004; 2. "Fragile Love (2007 version)" Released: 2006; 3. "Let Me Feel your Sexappeal" Released: 2007; 4. "Sensuality" Released: 2007; 5. "Love 2 Love" Released: 2009

Sensuality is the second album by German eurodance/trance project S.E.X. Appeal. It is the first album with Lyane Leigh as the project's only member. The album, which spawned five singles, was released in 2007. The songs "Fragile Love" and "Kids in America", a cover version of Kim Wilde's song of the same name, are song remixes from their debut album Peeping Tom.

== Track listings ==
Standard edition

1. Sensuality – 4:28
2. Let Me Feel Your Sexappeal – 4:41
3. Livin' a Lie – 4:18
4. Love 2 Love – 4:04
5. Fly Away – 5:09
6. Love Me or Leave Me – 4:02
7. Skin 2 Skin – 3:29
8. Fragile Love (2007 version) – 3:58
9. Kids in America (2007 version) – 3:34
10. Mega-mix V2.0 – 6:36
11. Send Me a Message – 3:33
12. Do You Love Me – 3:41

Special 2-disc edition

Disc 1:

1. Fragile Love (radio rap mix)
2. Sensuality – 4:28
3. Let Me Feel Your Sexappeal – 4:41
4. Livin' a Lie – 4:18
5. Love 2 Love – 4:04
6. Fly Away – 5:09
7. Love Me or Leave Me – 4:02
8. Skin 2 Skin – 3:29
9. Fragile Love (2007 version) – 3:58
10. Kids in America (2007 version) – 3:34
11. Mega-mix V2.0 – 6:36
12. Send Me a Message – 3:33
13. Do You Love Me – 3:41

Disc 2: Bonus extended versions & remixes for DJs

1. Let Me Feel Your Sexappeal (Cc.K & ClubBazz remix)
2. Fly Away (S.e.x.tended version)
3. Fragile Love (Spooky Dee/Tom Razzle Remix)
4. Livin' a Lie (S.e.x.tended version)
5. Do You Love Me (radio house remix)
6. Let Me Feel Your Sexappeal (S.e.x.tended version)
7. Kids in America (freestyle mix)
8. Love 2 Love (S.e.x.tended version)
9. Fragile Love (dub mix)
10. Send Me a Message (S.e.x.tended version)
11. Do You Love Me (S.e.x.tended version)
12. Kids in America (extended freestyle mix)

== Musical style ==
On their second album, S.E.X. Appeal changed their style from the now unusual Eurodance to the modern vocal trance. But there are some exceptions, for example: "Let me feel your sexappeal" is a Eurodance song, while "Do you love me" is a disco song.

== Notes ==
- The bonus remix disc on the special edition is not identical with the project's first compilation album Sensuality - The Remix Album.
- The megamix on the album includes "Sensuality", "Love me or leave me", "Skin 2 skin", "Fly away", "Livin' a lie", "Let me feel your sexappeal" and "Love 2 love".

== Singles ==
=== Do You Love Me ===
2004, the first single from the album was released, entitled "Do you love me", which is their seventh single overall.

1. Do You Love Me (radio edit) 3:41
2. Do You Love Me (radio house remix) 3:44
3. Do You Love Me (Sextended version) 5:18
4. Here We Go (album version)
5. Do You Love Me (instrumental version) 3:34

=== Fragile Love ===
"Fragile Love" was S.E.X. Appeal's eighth single overall. The song was originally released on their 1999 album Peeping Tom. For the single release, almost 7 years after the release of the album, an up-to-date remix of the song were made. A slightly remixed version of the 2006 remix was released on their album Sensuality.

1. Fragile Love (radio edit) 3:41
2. Fragile Love (original dub mix) 3:41
3. Fragile Love (Spooky Dee / Tom Razzle remix) 3:57

=== Let Me Feel Your Sexappeal ===
The third single of the album, their ninth single overall, was entitled "Let me feel your sexappeal". The radio edit is slightly cut (about 35 seconds).

1. Let Me Feel Your Sexappeal (radio edit) 4:02
2. Let Me Feel Your Sexappeal (S.E.X.tended version) 7:04
3. Let Me Feel Your Sexappeal (CcK & Clubbazz remix) 4:03
4. Let Me Feel Your Sexappeal (album track) 4:40

=== Sensuality ===
The song "Sensuality" was the fourth single of their album with the same name, and their tenth single overall. The song was slightly cut for the single release. Another different cut version of the song was used for the music video, which by the way was the first single from the album to get a video clip.

1. Sensuality (radio edit) 3:58
2. Sensuality (Addicted Craze remix) 5:55
3. Sensuality (BassUp! remix) 5:24
4. Sensuality (Groove-T remix) 6:53
5. Sensuality (Kevin Stomper remix) 3:42
6. Sensuality (album version) 4:29

Bonus: Sensuality (music video) 4:18

=== Love 2 Love ===
"Love 2 Love" is the fifth and final single from the album. It is the twelfth single overall by S.E.X. Appeal. For the single release, the song was remixed by Electrophunk. The new sound is an electronica song.

1. Love 2 Love (Electrophunk radio edit) 3:17
2. Love 2 Love (Seventy 4 remix) 3:50
3. Love 2 Love (Twister's extended electro club mix) 5:26
4. Love 2 Love (Electropuhunk club mix) 5:36
5. Love 2 Love (album version) 4:02
6. Send Me a Message (club mix) 5:26
