= Sex Affairs =

Studio album by E-Rotic
- Released: 29 May 1995
- Recorded: 1994–1995
- Genre: Eurodance
- Language: English
- Label: Intercord (Blow Up); Bros. Music; Dureco
- Producer: David Brandes; Felix Gauder

E-Rotic chronology
Sex Affairs (1995)	The Power of Sex (1996)

Singles from Sex Affairs
- 1. "Max Don't Have Sex with Your Ex" Released: 23 June 1994; 2. "Fred Come to Bed" Released: 1 March 1995; 3. "Sex on the Phone" Released: 6 June 1995

Sex Affairs is the debut album from German Eurodance project E-Rotic. It was released in May 1995 and was a typical Eurodance album of the 1990s. It features three international hit singles; "Max Don't Have Sex with Your Ex", "Fred Come to Bed," and "Sex on the Phone", and included two remixes of the first two hits. The album itself achieved success in Finland, where it topped the chart for three weeks and remained in the top 30 for 15 weeks. It was also successful, but not as much, in Germany where it peaked at number 15 and charted for 16 weeks. In Austria, the album reached number 15 and fell off the top 50 after 16 weeks.

== Track listing ==
1. "Max Don't Have Sex with Your Ex" – 3:29
2. "Big Max" – 4:20
3. "Sex Me" – 3:58
4. "Come on Make Love to Me" – 3:26
5. "Fred Come to Bed" – 3:56
6. "Wild Love" – 3:58
7. "Sex on the Phone" – 3:54
8. "Falling for a Witch" – 3:45
9. "Take My Love" – 4:57
10. "Final Heartbreak" – 3:45
11. "Max Don't Have Sex with Your Ex" (Remix) – 6:12
12. "Fred Come to Bed" (Remix) – 5:45

== Charts ==
Chart (1995)	Peak position
Austrian Albums (Ö3 Austria)	15
Dutch Albums (Album Top 100)	74
Finnish Albums (Suomen virallinen lista)	1
German Albums (Offizielle Top 100)	15
Hungarian Albums (MAHASZ)	7
Swiss Albums (Schweizer Hitparade)	26

== Sales and certifications ==
Certifications for Sex Affairs
Region	Certification	Certified units/sales
Japan (RIAJ)	Gold	100,000^{^}
^{^} Shipments figures based on certification alone.
