= Max Don't Have Sex With Your Ex =

Single by E-Rotic

from the album Sex Affairs
- B-side: "Remix"
- Released: 23 June 1994
- Genre: Eurodance
- Length: 3:31
- Label: Blow Up
- Songwriters: David Brandes; John O'Flynn; Felix Gauder
- Producers: David Brandes; Felix Gauder; John O'Flynn

E-Rotic singles chronology
"Max Don't Have Sex With Your Ex" (1994)	"Fred Come to Bed" (1995)

"Max Don't Have Sex With Your Ex" is a song recorded by German Eurodance act E-Rotic, released in June 1994, by label Blow Up, as the group's debut and lead single from their first album, Sex Affairs (1995). Written and composed by David Brandes, John O'Flynn, and Felix Gauder, the song hit success in Germany where it peaked at number seven. In the Netherlands, it reached number four while in Austria, it reached number 12. It also peaked at number 14 in Switzerland and number 20 in France. The song is the group's highest-charting single in the United Kingdom, where it peaked at number 45 on the UK Singles Chart in June 1995.

== Critical reception ==
Simon Price from Melody Maker described the song as "Brookside-inspired". A reviewer from Music Week gave it three out of five, writing, "Parodying the Euro-techno sounds that have dominated the charts recently, this cautionary tug-of-love tale could be the tune sunburnt young men collapse to on the Med this summer." Music Week editor Alan Jones commented, "A naff title for sure, but it's a storming house record." James Hamilton from the Record Mirror Dance Update declared it as a "nagging girl warned (quite rightly as 'It will make your life complex') although otherwise idiotically simple jaunty Euro smash".

== Music video ==
The accompanying music video for "Max Don't Have Sex With Your Ex" was animated and directed by Hartcore. The camera descends onto Max's wife sleeping alone as Max is seen cheating on her. She later opens her eyes and discovers her husband cheating on her in his ex's apartment. The video later depicts Max and his mistress at the pool of her house, on a planet resembling a breast, and at a subway station. The wife attempts to catch them in the act using a telescope and while she takes the train at night. The video was A-listed on German music television channel VIVA in December 1994.

== Track listings ==
- CD maxi - Europe
1. "Max Don't Have Sex With Your Ex" (radio edit) – 3:31
2. "Max Don't Have Sex With Your Ex" (extended version) – 5:23
3. "Max Don't Have Sex With Your Ex" (Hot Sex Max Mix) – 5:23
- CD single, 12" maxi – remixes
1. "Max Don't Have Sex With Your Ex" (Dance The Max) – 6:12
2. "Max Don't Have Sex With Your Ex" (Touch The Max) – 4:24
3. "Max Don't Have Sex With Your Ex" (Rave The Max) – 5:04

== Credits ==
- Cover artwork by I-D Büro
- Illustration by Zoran
- Produced by David Brandes, Domenico Livrano and Felix J. Gauder
- Recorded and mixed at Bros Studios, Germany
- Published by Cosima Music/Edition Birdie

== Charts ==
=== Weekly charts ===
Chart (1994–1995)	Peak position
Australia (ARIA)	67
Austria (Ö3 Austria Top 40)	12
Belgium (Ultratop 50 Flanders)	8
Belgium (VRT Top 30)	10
Europe (Eurochart Hot 100)	25
Europe (European Dance Radio)	11
Finland (Suomen virallinen lista)	15
France SNEP	20
Germany (Media Control Charts)	7
Netherlands (Dutch Top 40)	4
Netherlands (Single Top 100)	4
Scotland (OCC)	51
Switzerland (Schweizer Hitparade)	14
UK Singles (OCC)	45
UK Club Chart (Music Week)	69
UK Pop Tip Club Chart (Music Week)	9

Chart (2003)	Peak position
Hungary (Dance Top 40)	39

=== Year-end charts ===
Chart (1995)	Position
Europe (Eurochart Hot 100)	96
Germany (Official German Charts)	53
Netherlands (Dutch Top 40)	48
Netherlands (Single Top 100)	74

== Certifications ==
Region	Certification	Certified units/sales
Germany (BVMI)	Gold	250,000^{^}
^{^} Shipments figures based on certification alone.
