= Peeping Tom (S.E.X. Appeal album) =

Studio album by S.E.X. Appeal
- Released: 1999
- Recorded: 1998–1999
- Genre: Vocal-Trance, Eurodance, Europop
- Language: English
- Label: 3H Music

S.E.X. Appeal chronology
Peeping Tom (1999)	Sensuality (2007)

Singles from Peeping Tom
- 1. "Sex is a thrill with the pill" Released: 1998; 2. "Hanky Spanky" Released: 1999; 3. "Manga maniac" Released: 1999; 4. "Kids in America" Released: 2000

Peeping Tom it is the first album by German eurodance/trance project S.E.X. Appeal. The album was released 1999 and spawned the four singles "Sex is a thrill with the pill", "Hanky Spanky", "Manga maniac" and "Kids in America", a Kim Wilde cover, the latter labeled as Lyane Leigh only. The song Fragile love has been released in a remixed version seven years later in 2006 and appeared on the second studio album Sensuality.

== Track listing ==
1. Peeping Tom - 3:51
2. Fragile Love - 3:41
3. Hanky Spanky - 3:39
4. It's Called Atlantis - 4:02
5. Here We Go - 4:00
6. Manga Maniac - 3:37
7. Total Eclipse - 4:06
8. Sex is a Thrill with a Pill - 3:46
9. Baby I Miss You - 4:38
10. Megamix - 5:10
11. Kids in America - 6:52
12. Hanky Spanky (S.e.x.tended Version) - 5:40
13. Manga Maniac (S.e.x.tended Version) - 5:48
