= Ein bißchen Frieden =

1982 song by Nicole

- German release cover

Single by Nicole

from the album Ein bißchen Frieden
- Language: German
- Released: 1982
- Length: 3:00
- Label: Jupiter
- Composer: Ralph Siegel
- Lyricist: Bernd Meinunger
- Producers: Ralph Siegel; Robert Jung

Alternative cover
- English version cover

Eurovision Song Contest 1982 entry
- Country: Germany
- Artist: Nicole Hohloch
- As: Nicole
- Language: German
- Composer: Ralph Siegel
- Lyricist: Bernd Meinunger
- Conductor: Norbert Daum

Finals performance
- Final result: 1st
- Final points: 161

Entry chronology
- ◄ "Johnny Blue" (1981)
- "Rücksicht" (1983) ►

Official performance video
- "Ein bißchen Frieden" on YouTube

"Ein bißchen Frieden" (pronounced [aɪn ˈbɪsçən ˈfʁiːdn̩]; lit. "A Bit of Peace") is a song recorded by German singer Nicole, with music composed by Ralph Siegel and German lyrics written by Bernd Meinunger. It represented West Germany in the Eurovision Song Contest 1982, held in Harrogate, resulting in the country's first of two wins, the country's second win came in 2010.

== Background ==
=== Conception ===
"Ein bißchen Frieden" (Note: The spelling of the word bißchen with ß was the correct spelling in Germany (East and West) and Austria prior to the German orthography reform of 1996. However, as the letter ß had been abolished in Swiss Standard German orthography before World War II, the correct spelling in Switzerland and Liechtenstein was bisschen even in 1982. German-language sources do not have a consistent approach as to how works written prior to 1996 are rendered in terms of spelling, however as with pre-1901 reform spellings before, the tendency in the 21st century has been increasingly towards modernizing spelling outside of academic use or direct quotes emphasized via sic.) was composed by Ralph Siegel with German lyrics written by Bernd Meinunger. It was recorded by 17-year-old German high-school student Nicole.

In addition to the original German-language version, she recorded the song in English as "A Little Peace" with lyrics by Paul Greedus, in French as "La paix sur terre" ("Peace on Earth") with lyrics by Pierre Delanoë and Jean-Paul Cara, in Spanish as "Un poco de paz" with lyrics by Alexander Mitchell, in Italian as "Un po' di pace", in Dutch as "Een beetje vrede" with lyrics by Cor Aaftink and Ed Daromella, in Danish as "En smule fred", in Russian as "Немного мира" ("Nyemnogo mira"), and in German-English-Dutch and German-English-Italian versions.

=== Eurovision ===
On 20 March 1982, "Ein bißchen Frieden" performed by Nicole competed in Ein Lied für Harrogate, the national final organized by ARD to select its song and performer for the 27th edition of the Eurovision Song Contest. The song won the competition, so it became the West German entry –and Nicole the performer– for Eurovision.

On 24 April 1982, the Eurovision Song Contest was held at the Harrogate International Centre in Harrogate hosted by the British Broadcasting Corporation (BBC), and broadcast live throughout the continent. Nicole performed "Ein bißchen Frieden" eighteenth and last on the evening, following Ireland's "Here Today, Gone Tomorrow" by The Duskeys. Norbert Daum conducted the event's orchestra in the German performance.

At the close of voting, the song had received 161 points winning the competition and resulting in Germany's first win at the contest by a record margin of 61 points, setting a new record for the largest winning margin that lasted until the 1997 contest. Nicole performed her winning reprise in four different languages: German, English, French, and Dutch. She decided to do this on the spur of the moment, to the bewilderment of her backing group.

=== Aftermath ===
"Ein bißchen Frieden" was one of fourteen songs chosen by Eurovision fans and a European Broadcasting Union (EBU) reference group, from among the 992 songs that had ever participated in the contest, to participate in the fiftieth anniversary competition Congratulations: 50 Years of the Eurovision Song Contest held on 22 October 2005 in Copenhagen. Although Nicole was not at the concert, it was re-enacted by dancers equipped with white guitars and a live orchestra as the original footage was shown in the background. It finished as the seventh most popular song in the history of the contest. Nicole performed her song in English, Italian, German, and French in the Eurovision sixtieth anniversary show Eurovision Song Contest's Greatest Hits held on 31 March 2015 in London.

The television special Eurovision: Europe Shine a Light, aired on 16 May 2020 throughout Europe, features "Ein bißchen Frieden" performed by Michael Schulte and Ilse DeLange at the Peace Palace in The Hague.

== Chart performance ==
The song topped the charts in many countries. According to composer and producer Ralph Siegel, the single sold 2.5–3 million copies.

"A Little Peace", the English version –with lyrics by Paul Greedus–, was released in predominantly English speaking territories and reached number 1 on the charts in the United Kingdom and Ireland, among others. It was the last Eurovision winner to top the charts in the United Kingdom. The English version also holds the honor of becoming the 500th British Number One.

=== Weekly charts ===
"Ein bißchen Frieden"

Chart (1982)	Peak position
Austria (Ö3 Austria Top 40)	1
Belgium (Ultratop 50 Flanders)	1
Finland (Suomen virallinen lista)	1
Norway (VG-lista)	1
Sweden (Sverigetopplistan)	1
Switzerland (Schweizer Hitparade)	1
West Germany (GfK)	1

"Een beetje vrede"

Chart (1982)	Peak position
Netherlands (Dutch Top 40)	1
Netherlands (Single Top 100)	1

"A Little Peace"

Chart (1982)	Peak position
Australia (Kent Music Report)	93
Ireland (IRMA)	1
New Zealand (Recorded Music NZ)	34
UK Singles (OCC)	1

=== Year-end charts ===
"Ein bißchen Frieden"

Chart (1982)	Peak position
Austria (Ö3 Austria Top 40)	2
Belgium (Ultratop)	17
Switzerland (Schweizer Hitparade)	8
West Germany (Media Control)	8

"Een beetje vrede"

Chart (1982)	Peak position
Netherlands (Dutch Top 40)	8
Netherlands (Single Top 100)	1

"A Little Peace"

Chart (1982)	Peak position
UK Singles (OCC)	38

== Legacy ==
"A Little Peace" was covered by Daniel O'Donnell for his 1997 album I Believe.

"Ein bißchen Frieden" was covered in Slovene as "Malo miru" by Irena Tratnik and also by Oto Pestner, in Czech as "Jsme dĕti slunce" by Jaromír Mayer, in Croatian as "Malo mira" by Ana Štefok, in Danish as "En smule fred" by Susanne Lana, in Hungarian as "Egy kis nyugalmat kívánok én" by Neoton Família, in Lithuanian as "Truputį laimės" by Roma Mačiulytė, in Polish as "Troszeczkę ziemi, troszeczkę słońca" by Eleni Tzoka, in Spanish as "Un poco de paz" by mexican singer Laura Flores and in Finnish as "Vain Hieman Rauhaa" by Katri Helena. In 1996, the Swedish techno/folk/bluegrass band Rednex, known for their hit Cotton-Eye Joe around that time, did a cover of "Ein bißchen Frieden", also played in the Eurovision Song Contest. The song has since been rendered in Dutch as "Een Beetje Vrede" recorded by Kathleen Aerts for her 2009 album In Symfonie.

Monica Forsberg wrote lyrics in Swedish as "En liten fågel", and the song became popular among dansband groups. It was recorded in Swedish by Stefan Borsch on his 1982 album En liten fågel as well as releasing it as a single the same year and Mats Bergmans on his 2004 album Vänd dig inte om. It was also recorded by Ingmar Nordströms on 1982 album Saxparty 9.

German techno-punk band DAF released "Ein bißchen Krieg" ("A Bit of War") as a response to the supposed sentimentality of the song. German comedy metal band J.B.O. released a parody cover of this song in Rammstein style in 1997 on their album "Laut!".

== See also ==
- Nicole Seibert discography

== Notes ==
Preceded by "Making Your Mind Up" by Bucks Fizz	Eurovision Song Contest winners 1982	Succeeded by "Si la vie est cadeau" by Corinne Hermès
