= Fred Come to Bed =

Single by E-Rotic

from the album Sex Affairs
- B-side: "Remix"
- Released: 1 March 1995
- Recorded: 1995
- Genre: Eurodance
- Length: 3:56
- Label: Blow Up; STIP; No Limits; Dureco; Remixed; EMI
- Songwriters: David Brandes; John O'Flynn
- Producers: David Brandes; Felix J. Gauder; John O'Flynn

E-Rotic singles chronology
| "Max Don't Have Sex With Your Ex" (1994) | "Fred Come to Bed" (1995) | "Sex on the Phone" (1995) |

"Fred Come to Bed" is a song recorded by German Eurodance act E-Rotic, released in March 1995 as the second single from their debut album, Sex Affairs (1995). Written and composed by David Brandes and John O'Flynn, the song hit success in German-speaking countries where it was a top ten hit. In Germany, the song was ranked for 18 weeks and was a top three hit. In Switzerland, it hit number six and remained in the top 50 for 16 weeks. In Austria, it fell off the top 30 after 14 weeks and a peak at number five. In France and Belgium (Flanders), the song was a top 20 hit, and in December 1995 the song reached number 90 in the United Kingdom.

The song was re-released the same year in German as "Fred Komm Ins Bett!" under the parody alias Fred Feuerstein. The lyrics were changed to be about the Hanna-Barbera cartoon The Flintstones.

On 15 September 2006, Eurodance group Shanadoo released a cover version in the Japanese language under the title "My Samurai" (Germany), achieving moderate success in some European countries.

The fantasy remix is included in the Sex Affairs album. The song also appeared on E-Rotic's compilations Greatest Tits (The Best of) and Dancemania presents E-ROTIC Megamix.

== Music video ==
The accompanying music video for "Fred Come to Bed" was directed by Zoran Bihać. It was A-listed on German music television channel VIVA in April 1995.

== Track listings ==
- CD maxi - Europe
1. "Fred Come to Bed" (radio edit) — 3:56
2. "Fred Come to Bed" (extended version) — 5:14
3. "Fred Come to Bed" (the Bed Fred remix) — 5:08
4. "Fred Come to Bed" (the Groaning E-Rotic remix) — 4:54
5. "Fred Come to Bed" (instrumental version) — 3:56
- CD maxi - UK
1. "Fred Come to Bed" (radio edit) — 3:56
2. "Fred Come to Bed" (the techno remix) — 5:08
3. "Fred Come to Bed" (the Groaning E-Rotic remix) — 4:54
4. "Fred Come to Bed" (the fantasy remix) — 5:46
5. "Fred Come to Bed" (the trance remix) — 5:07
- 12" maxi - Europe
1. "Fred Come to Bed" (extended version) — 5:14
2. "Fred Come to Bed" (the Bed Fred remix) — 5:08
3. "Fred Come to Bed" (the Groaning E-rotic remix) — 4:54
- 12" maxi - UK
1. "Fred Come to Bed" (the techno remix) — 5:08
2. "Fred Come to Bed" (the Groaning E-Rotic remix) — 4:54
3. "Fred Come to Bed" (the fantasy remix) — 5:46
4. "Fred Come to Bed" (the trance remix) — 5:07
- CD single - France
1. "Fred Come to Bed" (radio edit) — 3:56
2. "Fred Come to Bed" (extended version) — 5:14
- CD single, 12" maxi - Remixes
1. "Fred Come to Bed" (dance the Fred) — 5:46
2. "Fred Come to Bed" (trance the Fred) — 5:07
3. "Fred Come to Bed" (the original Fred) — 3:57
- CD single, 12" maxi - Fred Komm Ins Bett! (Fred Feuerstein)
1. "Fred Komm Ins Bett!" (Radio Edit) - 3:58
2. "Fred Komm Ins Bett!" (Extended Version) - 5:38
3. "Fred Komm Ins Bett!" (Yappadappadu Version) - 3:58
- CD single - Fred Komm Ins Bett! (Die Remixe) (Fred Feuerstein)
1. "Fred Komm Ins Bett!" (Flintstones Rave) - 5:46
2. "Fred Komm Ins Bett!" (Flintstones House) - 7:01
3. "Fred Komm Ins Bett!" (Flintstones Dance) - 6:10

== Credits ==
- Cover artwork by I-D Büro
- Illustration by Zoran
- Produced by David Brandes, Domenico Livrano and Felix J. Gauder
- Recorded and mixed at Bros Studios, Germany
- Published by Cosima Music/Edition Birdie

== Charts ==
=== Weekly charts ===
| Chart (1995) ^{1} | Peak position |
|---|---|
| Austria (Ö3 Austria Top 40) | 5 |
| Belgium (Ultratop Flanders) | 11 |
| Belgium (Ultratop Wallonia) | 28 |
| Denmark (IFPI) | 17 |
| Europe (Eurochart Hot 100) | 13 |
| Finland (Suomen virallinen lista) | 6 |
| France (SNEP) | 18 |
| Germany (Official German Charts) | 3 |
| Netherlands (Dutch Top 40) | 12 |
| Netherlands (Single Top 100) | 15 |
| Sweden (Sverigetopplistan) | 30 |
| Switzerland (Schweizer Hitparade) | 6 |
| UK Singles (OCC) | 90 |

| Chart (2006) ^{2} | Peak position |
|---|---|
| Austria (Ö3 Austria Top 40) | 15 |
| Finland (Suomen virallinen lista) | 15 |
| Germany (Official German Charts) | 17 |

^{1} E-Rotic version
^{2} Shanadoo version

=== Year-end charts ===
| Chart (1995) | Position |
|---|---|
| Austria (Ö3 Austria Top 40) | 33 |
| Belgium (Ultratop Flanders) | 93 |
| Europe (Eurochart Hot 100) | 85 |
| Germany (Official German Chart) | 36 |
| Latvia (Latvijas Top 50) | 117 |
| Netherlands (Dutch Top 40) | 135 |
| Switzerland (Schweizer Hitparade) | 51 |

== Certifications ==
| Region | Certification | Certified units/sales |
|---|---|---|
| Germany (BVMI) | Gold | 250,000^{^} |
^{^} Shipments figures based on certification alone.
