= Nicole Seibert discography =

Cataloguing of published recordings by Nicole

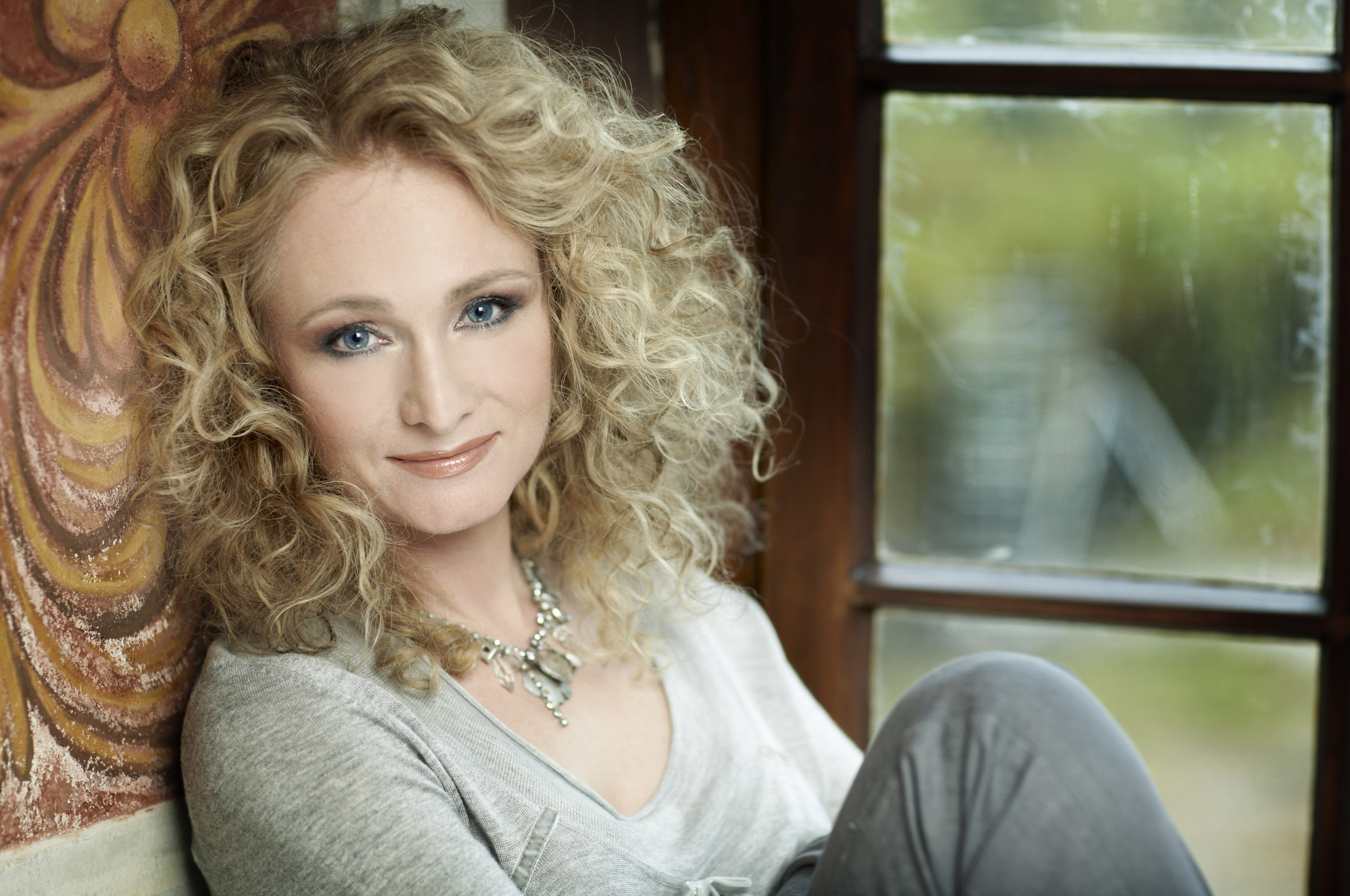
- Photograph of Nicole from her 2008 promotional collection

This discography is an overview of the musical works released by the German schlager and pop musician Nicole, who gained international recognition when she won the 1982 Eurovision Song Contest performing "Ein bißchen Frieden".

== Studio albums ==
List of studio albums, with selected chart positions, sales figures and certifications
Title	Details	Peak chart positions							Certifications
Title	Details	(Denmark) DEN	(Austria) AUT	(Germany) GER	(Switzerland) CHE	(Netherlands) NL	(Sweden) SWE	(United Kingdom) UK	Certifications
Flieg nicht so hoch, mein kleiner Freund	Released: 1981; Language: German; Label: Jupiter Records; Formats: Vinyl LP	—	—	—	—	—	—	—	
Ein bißchen Frieden	Released: 1 July 1982; Language: German / English; Label: Jupiter Records; Formats: Vinyl LP	—	1	1	—	3	7	85	BMI: Gold
So viele Lieder sind in mir	Released: 6 November 1983; Language: German; Label: Jupiter Records; Formats: Vinyl LP	—	16	22	20	36	—	—	
Gesichter der Liebe	Released: 1985; Language: German; Label: Jupiter; Formats: Vinyl LP, CD	—	—	—	—	—	—	—	
Moderne Piraten	Released: 1987; Label: Jupiter; Formats: Vinyl LP, CD, Cassette	—	—	—	—	—	—	—	
Und ich denke schon wieder an Dich	Released: 2 September 1991; Label: Jupiter; Formats: Vinyl LP, CD, cassette	—	—	—	—	—	—	—	
Und außerdem	Released: 24 October 1994; Label: Jupiter; Formats: Vinyl LP, CD, cassette	—	—	—	—	—	—	—	
Alles fließt	Released: 30 May 2005; Label: Ariola; Formats: CD, streaming	—	—	21	—	—	—	—	
Christmas Songs (Fröhliche Weihnachten Mit Nicole)	Released 23 October 2006; Language: English & German; Label: Ariola; Formats: CD	—	—	—	—	—	—	—	
Mitten ins Herz	Released: 2 August 2008; Label: Ariola; Formats: CD	—	—	24	96	—	—	—	
Traumfänger	Released: 24 April 2016; Label: Telamo; Formats: CD, streaming	—	49	19	92	—	—	—	
12 Punkte!	Released: 13 April 2017; Label: Telamo; Formats: CD, streaming	—	57	18	—	—	—	—	
50 ist das neue 25	Released: 11 October 2019; Label: Telamo; Formats: CD, streaming	—	70	21	—	—	—	—	
Carpe Diem	Released: 15 November 2024; Label: Formats: CD, streaming	—	—	—	—	—	—	—	
"—" denotes a recording that did not chart or was not released in that territory.

== Compilation Albums ==
- 1992: Augenblicke – Meine Schönsten Lieder
- 1993: So Many Songs Are In My Heart (English)
- 2005: Best Of 1982–2005
- 2010: 30 Jahre – Mit Leib und Seele

== Charted singles ==
List of singles, with selected chart positions and certifications
Year	Title	Peak chart positions										Certifications
Year	Title	GER	AUS	AUT	IRE	NL	NOR	NZ	SWE	SWI	UK	Certifications
1981	"Flieg nicht so hoch, mein kleiner Freund"	2	—	—	18	—	—	—	—	5	—	
1981	"Der alte Mann und das Meer"	41	—	—	—	—	—	—	—	—	—	
1982	"Ein bißchen Frieden"	1	93	1	1	1	1	34	1	1	1	GER: Gold; BPI: Gold
1982	"Papillon"	23	—	11	—	25	—	—	—	10	—	
1982	"Give Me More Time"	—	—	—	—	—	—	—	—	—	75	
1983	"Ich hab' dich doch lieb"	8	—	10	—	—	—	—	—	—	—	
1983	"Wenn die Blumen weinen könnten"	45	—	—	—	—	—	—	—	—	—	
1985	"Allein in Griechenland"	49	—	—	—	—	—	—	—	—	—	
1986	"Laß mich nicht allein"	22	—	—	—	—	—	—	—	—	—	
1987	"Song for the World"	48	—	—	—	—	—	—	—	—	—	
1987	"Und wenn die Nacht kommt"	75	—	—	—	—	—	—	—	—	—	
1989	"Kommst du heut' Nacht"	72	—	—	—	—	—	—	—	—	—	
1990	"Jeder Zaun, jede Mauer wird aus Blumen sein"	60	—	—	—	—	—	—	—	—	—	
1991	"Ein leises Lied"	54	—	—	—	—	—	—	—	—	—	
1992	"Mit dir vielleicht..."	42	—	—	—	—	—	—	—	—	—	
1992	"Mach was du willst "	53	—	—	—	—	—	—	—	—	—	
1993	"Wenn ich dich nicht lieben würde"	93	—	—	—	—	—	—	—	—	—	
1993	"Dann küß mich doch"	85	—	—	—	—	—	—	—	—	—	
1995	"Mehr als ein bißchen Frieden"	81	—	—	—	—	—	—	—	—	—	
1999	"Wirst Du mich lieben "	90	—	—	—	—	—	—	—	—	—	
"+" denotes information that may be available on the secondary chart.
