= King Kong (E-Rotic song) =

2001 single

Single by E-Rotic

from the album Sex Generation
- B-side: "The Story is Over"
- Released: September 2001
- Recorded: 2001
- Length: 14:45
- Producer: David Brandes

E-Rotic singles chronology
"Billy Jive (With Willy's Wife)" (2001)	"King Kong" (2001)	"Max Don't Have Sex with Your Ex" (2003)

"King Kong" is a single released by the eurodance group E-Rotic in 2001. In 2005 it was covered by J-Pop girl group Hinoi Team, and again in 2006 by the Germany-based J-pop group Shanadoo.

== E-Rotic's version ==
In September 2001, E-Rotic released "King Kong" in Germany. One month later, the song was featured in the album Sex Generation.

=== Music video ===
Like most of E-Rotic's videos, King Kong is a surreal cartoon that takes place in the ongoing E-Rotic character universe. The video features a group of island natives with the intention of sacrificing three topless girls to a giant gorilla, a new character named "King Kong".

Some scenes from E-Rotic's previous music video, "Billy Jive (With Willy's Wife)", reappeared here.

=== Track listing ===
Premium
No.	Title	Length
1.	"King Kong" (Radio Edit)	3:49
2.	"The Story is Over"	4:01
3.	"King Kong" (Extended Version)	6:55
Total length:		14:45

== Hinoi Team version ==
"King Kong"

Single by Hinoi Team

from the album Super Euro Party
- B-side: "Super Euro Flash"
- Released: (Japan) July 27, 2005
- Genre: J-pop, Eurobeat
- Label: Avex Trax

Hinoi Team singles chronology
"Ike Ike" (2005)	"King Kong" (2005)	"Night of Fire / Play with the Numbers" (2005)

CD-only cover

In July, 2005 Hinoi Team release "King Kong" as the group's second single. This single was released only in Japan.

Although Hinoi Team's version retains a sprinkle of the English lyrics, this version was re-written in Japanese. The lyrics also change the sexual innuendo theme of the song into a childlike love song.

=== Music video ===
The video features Hinoi Team dancing in front of a waterfall, with solo scenes in a fantasy-like garden. They dance the para para routine for King Kong, a popular style of dance in Japan.

=== Track listing ===
CD
No.	Title	Length
1.	"King Kong"
2.	"Super Euro Flash"
3.	"Ike Ike" (New Generation Mix)
4.	"King Kong" (Eurobeat Version)
5.	"King Kong" (TV Mix)
6.	"Super Euro Flash" (TV Mix)

DVD
No.	Title	Length
1.	"King Kong" (Video Clip)
2.	"King Kong" (Para Para Version)
3.	"Ike Ike" (Korikki Version)
4.	"Offshoot"

== Shanadoo version ==
"King Kong"

Single by Shanadoo

from the album Welcome to Tokyo
- Released: (Germany) June 16, 2006
- Recorded: 2006
- Genre: Eurodance
- Length: 23:36
- Label: Icezone Music
- Producer: David Brandes

Shanadoo singles chronology
"King Kong" (2006)	"My Samurai" (2006)

In 2006, Shanadoo debuted in Germany with the single, "King Kong." It is a cover of Hinoi Team's version of the song, opposed to the original lyrics in E-Rotic's version. This single was not released in Japan, although it was included in the album Welcome to Tokyo, which did have a Japanese release.

=== Music video ===
Shanadoo's music video features the group dancing in a pink room. They also perform the para para routine for "King Kong" in this video.

=== Track listing ===
Premium
No.	Title	Length
1.	"King Kong" (Radio Edit)	3:43
2.	"King Kong" (Extended Version)	7:02
3.	"King Kong" (Karaoke Version)	3:39
4.	"King Kong" (Video)	3:30
5.	"Para Para Tanzanleitung (Para Para Dance Instruction)" (Bonus Video)	2:04
6.	"King Kong" (Making of Video)	3:38
Total length:		23:36
