= The Power of Sex =

Studio album by E-Rotic
- Released: 27 June 1996
- Label: Intercord (Blow Up); Toshiba-EMI
- Producer: David Brandes; Felix Gauder

E-Rotic chronology
Sex Affairs (1995)	The Power of Sex (1996)	Sexual Madness (1997)

Singles from The Power of Sex
- 1. "Willy Use a Billy... Boy" Released: 4 October 1995; 2. "Help Me Dr. Dick" Released: 10 January 1996; 3. "Fritz Love My Tits" Released: 28 May 1996; 4. "Gimme Good Sex" Released: September 1996

The Power of Sex is the second album by German Eurodance group E-Rotic. It was released in Europe in June 1996.

== Track listings ==
=== Standard edition ===
1. "Willy Use a Billy... Boy" – 3:41
2. "Why" – 4:13
3. "Help Me Dr. Dick" – 3:42
4. "Ecstasy" – 3:59
5. "The Power of Sex" – 3:35
6. "Love And Sex Are Free" – 3:21
7. "Talk to Your Girl" – 4:47
8. "Fritz Love My Tits" – 4:08
9. "Erotic Dreams" – 4:49
10. "Tears in Your Blue Eyes" – 3:57
11. "Gimme Good Sex" – 3:50
12. "Angel's Night" – 3:54
13. "Freedom" – 4:07
14. "Willy Use a Billy ... Boy" (the house remix) – 6:02
15. "Help Me Dr. Dick" (the first aid remix) – 5:54

=== Special edition ===
1. "Help Me Dr. Dick" – 3:43
2. "Willy Use a Billy... Boy" – 3:41
3. "Why" – 4:13
4. "Ecstasy" – 3:58
5. "The Power of Sex" – 3:35
6. "Love and Sex Are Free" – 3:21
7. "Talk to Your Girl" – 4:47
8. "Fritz Love My Tits" – 4:07
9. "Erotic Dreams" – 4:48
10. "Tears in Your Blue Eyes" – 3:57
11. "Gimme Good Sex" – 3:50
12. "Angel's Night" – 3:54
13. "Freedom" – 4:06
14. "Willy Use a Billy... Boy" (The House Remix) – 6:02
15. "Help Me Dr. Dick" (The First Aid Remix) – 5:54
16. "E-Rotic Megamix" – 4:03
17. "Willy Use a Billy... Boy" (Without Sexy Heavy Breathing Voices) – 1:58
18. "Help Me Dr. Dick" (Dr's Hospital Remix) – 5:04

== Charts ==
Chart (1996)	Peak position
Austrian Albums (Ö3 Austria)	18
Czech Albums (IFPI CR)	3
Finnish Albums (Suomen virallinen lista)	2
German Albums (Offizielle Top 100)	47
Hungarian Albums (Mahasz)	4
Swiss Albums (Schweizer Hitparade)	18

== Sales and certifications ==
Certifications for The Power of Sex
Region	Certification	Certified units/sales
Japan (RIAJ)	Gold	100,000^{^}
^{^} Shipments figures based on certification alone.
