= List of trance genres =

A list of trance music subgenres and derivations. Several crossover with other major forms of electronic music.

== Subgenres ==
Subgenre classifications of trance
Subgenre	Alternate names	Origin	Description
Acid trance		Germany, Netherlands, Belgium and United Kingdom	The prevalent early '90s style of the genre, sometimes called "first-wave" trance. It is characterized by the use of a Roland TB-303 bass machine as the lead synthesizer.
Big room trance		Netherlands	The 2010s form of trance, characterized by big room sound influenced by Dutch house and hardstyle.
Classic trance		Germany	Purportedly the original form of trance music, said to have originated in the late 1980s to early 1990s. Characterized by less percussion than techno, more emphasis on the melody, arpeggio-based melodies, and repetitive melodic chords/arpeggios.
Dream trance	Dream house, dream dance	Italy	A variety of epic trance popularized by Robert Miles in the mid-1990s which is highly melodic. It tends to feature soothing piano riffs and draws influences from deep house and progressive house music.
Eurotrance	Euro-trance	Europe	Eurotrance emerged as a hybrid of hard trance and Eurodance music and was most popular between late 1998 and 2000.
Hands up	Handz up!, dancecore	Europe; mainly in Germany, Poland, Netherlands, Belgium, France, Russia, Finland, Liechtenstein and United Kingdom	A style of Eurotrance, characterized as hybrid of dream trance, progressive trance, hard trance and Eurodance music that incorporates hardstyle bass and trance elements. It is closely related to the uplifting trance. The vocal elements are often sped up. It is often confused with vocal trance. The lyrics are normally primitive, containing an intro to the song usually without percussion, and often include traces of the classic happy hardcore. Some happy hardcore producers began to produce tracks in this style.
Goa trance	Goa	Goa (India), Israel	A complex, melodic form of trance named after Goa, India, originating in that region in the early 1990s. It often takes influence from Indian classical music (ragas). Ragas usually consist of soothing melodies by the harmonium, sitar, and various other Indian instruments. The style has been developed by musicians from many countries, and later influenced the similar psychedelic trance subgenre.
Hard trance	Hardtrance	Germany	Aggressive and slower trance sound, originating in Frankfurt, and including influences from hardcore. This style arguably began around 1993 and peaked in popularity in the late '90s.
Ibiza trance	Balearic trance	Spain	This style has been influenced by various relaxed music genres, especially linked to Ibiza's (Spain) chill-out style of life paralleled with the huge rave scene that is present in the islands. Very melodic and mellow, sometimes with ethnic features, and it often samples seaside elements like seagulls, dolphins and ocean waves. It relies more heavily on guitar than other trance genres. It also include danceable uptempo songs featuring syncopated or Latin rhythms.
Neotrance	Neo-trance, nutrance, nu-trance, minimal trance	Germany, Sweden and Denmark	The genre that arrived in early 2000s in the vernacular to describe the developments towards more minimalist trance.
Nitzhonot	Nitzhonot trance, nitzh, Uplifting Goa	Israel	Nitzhonot (Hebrew: נצחונות, "victories") is a form of Goa trance that emerged during the mid-late 1990s in Israel. Nitzhonot blends hard pulsating basses, sometimes referred to as "laserkicks", with the Eastern melodies typical for Indian Goa trance from 1996 and 1997. The tracks are usually in a range of 145–155 bpm.
Progressive trance		Germany, Poland, Netherlands, Liechtenstein and the United Kingdom	Differentiated from the then "regular" trance by more breakdowns, less acid-like sound & bass chord changes that gave the repeating lead synth a feeling of "progression".
Psychedelic trance	Psytrance, psy	Goa, Germany, France, Russia, Israel, United Kingdom, Australia, New Zealand and Turkey	A kind of trance that was developed in the late 1990s and grew from Goa trance culture of India. While it retains strong cultural ties to India, the term has come to refer generally to the music and style of culture associated with it, which is now found in many countries. One defining feature of this genre is the use of a lot of spontaneous sounds and samples. However the range of styles is quite broad, and it has several subgenres of its own, listed below.
Tech trance	Techno-trance, techno/trance	Germany	A merge of techno and trance, tech trance appeared in the mid-1990s. Usually tech trance tunes consist of non-changeable bassline, loud drums and percussion and mostly ambient pads.
Uplifting trance	Anthem trance, emotional trance, energetic trance, epic trance, euphoric trance, melodic trance, Dutch trance	Germany	Popular style of trance that emerged in the wake of progressive and acid trance in the late '90s.
Vocal trance		Germany, Netherlands, Belgium, Liechtenstein and United Kingdom	Broad term referring to trance with a full set of lyrics, which may or may not be any of the above genres (mostly uplifting, and epic trance often have vocals). Often an artist will borrow a singer's talents as opposed to the singer himself or herself, or sample from/remix more traditional pop music. Note that there is some debate as to where the divide lies between vocal trance and Eurodance.

Subgenre classifications of psychedelic trance
Subgenre	Alternate names	Origin	Description
Hi-Tech	Hightech, Hitech, Highbpm	India, Israel, Mexique, Brasil	It stands around 200 bpm with a more energetic, electric and positive feeling.
Forest	Nordic forest, Twilight, Scando, Hi-Forest, Night Full-On	Scandinavia	Its bpm stands in between Progressive Trance and Darkpsy around 150 Bpm. The genre uses organic sounds to mimic the forest atmosphere.
Dark psytrance	Dark psy, dark psychedelic trance, dark trance, darkpsy, alien psy, black trance, cyberdelic psytrance, horror psy, horror trance, killer psytrance, psycore	Germany and Russia	Does not use vocals, though sampling is common, with speech and other kind of samples usually being taken from different kind of movies (especially horror movies), or occasionally from other tracks. Sometimes sampling elements form other genres of music is done as a mockery of the original tracks.
Full-on	Full on, fullon, full-on psychedelic trance, full-on psytrance, full-on trance, Israeli full-on	Israel	Genre draws its main influences from more radio-friendly genres such as nitzhonot and Eurodance, futuristic melodies, occasional electric guitar performances and usage of vocals.
Progressive psytrance	Progpsy, prog-psytrance, psygressive, psyprog, psy-prog	Germany, Norway, Denmark and Sweden	Genre combines the elements of minimal sounding progressive electronic music and complex developments of psychedelic music. Its heritage can be traced back to the developments of minimal techno, tech, and minimal house.
Psychedelic breakbeat	Psybreaks, psychedelic breaks, psy tech-funk	Goa, Israel, Spain, France, and United Kingdom	A mixture of psychedelic trance and breakbeat.
Suomisaundi	Freeform psytrance, spugedelic trance, suomi psytrance, suomi-saundi, suomisoundi, suomistyge, Finnish psy	Finland	A style of freeform psychedelic trance, that originated in Finland around the mid-1990s.
Zenonesque	Dark progressive psy, dark progressive psytrance, psygressive, zenonsque	Germany	A style of psytrance which is any psytrance that has characteristics of Zenon Records signature sound. It is often deep, dark ambient sounding with a lower tempo. It can include elements of techno.

== Derivations ==
Derived genres from trance
Genre	Description	Origin
Futurepop	A fusion of electronic body music and anthem trance. This music has a cold, dark feeling while having grandiose synth melodies and, generally, a more trance-like sound than other subgenres of EBM. Vocals have a more prominent place in Futurepop than most other types of trance, and lyrics tend to be focused upon themes of complex human emotion, alienation, extropianism, and existentialism; as well as global issues, such as war, the apocalypse, and environmentalism.	Norway, Sweden, Germany, United Kingdom and United States
Hardstyle	Closely related to nu style gabber and hard trance. Its sound is usually characterized by a mix of gabber and hardcore-like kick/bass sounds, spontaneous rhythmic changes, trance-like synth stabs, sweeps, and miscellaneous samples. However, Hardstyle usually has a much slower bpm than gabber (between 140 and 150).	Germany, Netherlands, Belgium, Switzerland, Italy and Greece
Psybient	Also known as "ambient psy", "psychedelic ambient", "ambient goa", or "ambient psytrance" it is a mixture of psychedelic trance with ambient and glitch.	Goa, Israel, France, and United Kingdom
Psydub	A fusion genre of electronic music that has its roots in psychedelic trance, ambient and dub music.	United Kingdom
Trance-fusion	A subgenre of the jam band movement that blends such musical styles as rock, jazz, funk, and electronica. It consists primarily of instrumental music. The terms jamtronica and livetronica are also used to refer to this style of music.	United States
