= Bernd Meinunger =

German lyricist and record producer (1944–2025)

- Also known as: John O'Flynn
- Born: 30 September 1944; Meiningen, Gau Thuringia, Germany
- Died: 17 October 2025 (aged 81) Grünwald, Bavaria, Germany
- Occupations: Lyricist; record producer
- Years active: 1970s–2025
- Website: Dr. Bernd Meinunger

Bernd Meinunger (30 September 1944 – 17 October 2025) was a German lyricist and record producer (with Hanne Haller) who frequently worked with Ralph Siegel and David Brandes. Several of his songs have represented Germany in the Eurovision Song Contest.

== Life and career ==
Meinunger co-wrote the song "Tut-Ench-Amun" with Horst Hornung and Christian Dornaus. It was recorded by Penny McLean and released on Jupiter 100 698 in 1979.

Meinunger died from multiple organ failure at his home in Grünwald, Bavaria, on 17 October 2025, at the age of 81.

== Selected works ==
- "Dschinghis Khan" (with Ralph Siegel)
- "Theater" (composed by Ralph Siegel, lyrics by Bernd Meinunger)
- "Papa Pingouin" (composed by Bernd Meinunger and Ralph Siegel, lyrics by Pierre Delanoë and Jean-Paul Cara)
- "Johnny Blue" (composed by Ralph Siegel, lyrics by Bernd Meinunger)
- "Ein bißchen Frieden" (A little peace) (composed by Ralph Siegel, lyrics by Bernd Meinunger)
- "Children, Kinder, Enfants" (composed by Ralph Siegel, lyrics by Jean-Michel Beriat and Bernd Meinunger)
- "Laß die Sonne in dein Herz" (composed by Ralph Siegel, lyrics by Bernd Meinunger)
- "Lied für einen Freund" (composed by Ralph Siegel, lyrics by Bernd Meinunger)
- "Felicità" (German version of a famous Italian song composed by Dario Farina, lyrics by Bernd Meinunger)
- "Papillon" (composed by Ralph Siegel, lyrics by Bernd Meinunger and Robert Jung)
- "Träume sind für alle da" (Dreams are there for everyone) (composed by Ralph Siegel, lyrics by Bernd Meinunger)
- "Wir geben 'ne Party" (composed by Ralph Siegel, lyrics by Bernd Meinunger)
- "Zeit" (composed by Ralph Siegel, lyrics by Bernd Meinunger)
- "Reise nach Jerusalem – Kudüs'e seyahat" (composed by Ralph Siegel, lyrics by Bernd Meinunger)
- "I Can't Live Without Music" (composed by Ralph Siegel, lyrics by Bernd Meinunger)
- "Let's Get Happy" (composed by Ralph Siegel, lyrics by Bernd Meinunger)
- "Cool Vibes" (composed by David Brandes and Petra Brändle (a.k.a. Jane Tempest), lyrics by Bernd Meinunger (a.k.a. John O'Flynn))
- "Run & Hide" (composed by David Brandes and Petra Brändle (a.k.a. Jane Tempest), lyrics by Bernd Meinunger (a.k.a. John O'Flynn))
- "If We All Give a Little" (composed by Ralph Siegel, lyrics by Bernd Meinunger)
- "Just Get Out of My Life" (composed by Ralph Siegel, lyrics by Bernd Meinunger and José Juan Santana Rodriguez)

== Eurovision Song Contest participations ==
Year	Song	Artist	Country	Position
1979	"Dschinghis Khan"	Dschinghis Khan	Germany	4th
1980	"Theater"	Katja Ebstein	Germany	2nd
1980	"Papa Pingouin"	Sophie & Magaly	Luxembourg	9th
1981	"Johnny Blue"	Lena Valaitis	Germany	2nd
1982	"Ein bißchen Frieden"	Nicole	Germany	1st
1985	"Children, Kinder, Enfants"	Ireen Sheer, C. & M. Roberts, Olivier, Solomon	Luxembourg	13th
1987	"Laß die Sonne in dein Herz"	Wind	Germany	2nd
1988	"Lied für einen Freund"	Maxi & Chris Garden	Germany	14th
1992	"Träume sind für alle da"	Wind	Germany	16th
1994	"Wir geben 'ne Party"	Mekado	Germany	3rd
1997	"Zeit"	Bianca Shomburg	Germany	18th
1999	"Reise nach Jerusalem – Kudüs'e seyahat"	Sürpriz	Germany	3rd
2002	"I Can't Live Without Music"	Corinna May	Germany	21st
2003	"Let's Get Happy"	Lou	Germany	11th
2005	"Cool Vibes"	Vanilla Ninja	Switzerland	8th
2005	"Run & Hide"	Gracia	Germany	24th
2006	"If We All Give a Little"	six4one	Switzerland	17th
2009	"Just Get Out of My Life"	Andrea Demirović	Montenegro	11th (semifinal)
2015	"Chain of Lights"	Michele Perniola & Anita Simoncini	San Marino	16th (semifinal)
