= David Brandes =

Songwriter from Germany

- Born: David Brändle; December 9, 1968 (age 57); Basel, Switzerland
- Occupations: Songwriter; Record producer

David Brandes (born David Brändle; December 9, 1968 in Basel, Switzerland) is a Swiss-born German songwriter and producer.

== Biography ==
Brandes was born in Basel, Switzerland and raised in Germany. He has written and produced for many artists, including E-Rotic, Bad Boys Blue, Chris Norman, Lemon Ice and Vanilla Ninja. Brandes also had two hits in Europe during 1994, with "Heartbreak Angel" and "Heartless Dancer". In 1995, Brandes was profiled in Billboard magazine as one of Germany's top producers.

In 2005, it was revealed that Brandes had bought hundreds of his own CDs (Gracia, Vanilla Ninja, Virus Incorporation) to manipulate the charts. The musicians produced by Brandes were banned from the German Top 100 for three months. In contrast to Vanilla Ninja, Gracia continued her co-operation with Brandes.

Due to his managing both Gracia and Vanilla Ninja at the time, Brandes had two songs in the Eurovision Song Contest 2005; Gracia's "Run & Hide" for Germany and Vanilla Ninja's "Cool Vibes" for Switzerland.

Preceded by Sven Lõhmus	Manager of Vanilla Ninja; 2003-2005	Succeeded by Christoph Helbig
