= Antonello Carozza =

- Born: Antonio Carozza; 5 July 1985 (age 41); Campobasso, Italy
- Genres: Pop
- Occupation: Singer-Composer-Art Director
- Instrument: piano
- Years active: 2004–present
- Website: antonellocarozza.com

Antonio Carozza (born 5 July 1985), better known as Antonello Carozza, is an Italian singer, songwriter, composer, art director in the Eurovision Song Contest, record producer, pianist and vocal coach. He was the art director of Michele Perniola and Anita Simoncini, who represented San Marino in the Eurovision Song Contest in the Eurovision Song Contest 2015, and the president of the Italian jury for the Eurovision Song Contest 2017.

== Early life ==
Carozza was born in Campobasso, Italy. From Campobasso Conservatory, he graduated in piano cum laude in 2006, and in 2009 graduated in jazz.

== Singer career ==
He debuted in the fourth edition of the popular Italian talent show Amici di Maria De Filippi. In 2005, in the City of Sanremo, following his victory in the preselection called SanremoLab, he qualified to compete in the Sanremo Music Festival 2006, in the newcomer category, where he received the prize for the Best New Production by an Independent label with the song Capirò crescerai written and composed of himself.

In 2009 Antonello debuted as a music producer with his single "27 angeli" (27 angels), a charity record in memory of the victims of 2002 earthquake in San Giuliano di Puglia.

In 2009, having been the runner-up in the New Wave Festival in Jurmala, Latvia, ending at 2nd place. The first place went to the Ukraine Jamala, winner of the Eurovision Song Contest 2016

In 2010, he took part in the Russian national selection for the Eurovision Song Contest 2010, ending in 8th place with the song "Senza respiro" His song was selected by OGAE Russia members to represent their country in the OGAE Second Chance contest.

In 2015, he was a guest in the New Wave Festival in Sochi. He has paired with the Italian contestant Michele Perniola.

== The first Italian singer in The Voice (Russia TV series) ==
In 2017 he took part in The Voice (Russia, season 6), produced by Channel One, with the team Pelageya.
On 13 October he performed the song "Il mondo" for the blind auditions.
On 10 November he won the Battle Round by beating the contestant Iyulina Popova with the song "The Final Countdown".
On 17 November he passed the Knockout with a medley comprising "We Are the Champions", "Bohemian Rhapsody" and "Somebody to Love" by Queen.

== Record producer, talent scout, art director ==
In 2012, Antonello pursued a career in artistic and event management, receiving again the second prize in the New Wave festival, this time as producer of Costanzo Del Pinto and Songwriter of Se vuoi. He also founded his own Queens' Academy, International Institute of Modern Music and Performing Arts in Isernia, Italy.

In 2013 Antonello was the record producer and vocal coach of Michele Perniola for the Junior Eurovision Song Contest 2013. He was also the composer of the San Marino's song "O-o-O Sole intorno a me".

In 2014 is the art director, record producer and vocal coach of The Peppermints for the Junior Eurovision Song Contest 2014. He was also the author of the San Marino's song "Breaking My Heart".

In 2015 is the art director of Michele Perniola and Anita Simoncini for San Marino in the Eurovision Song Contest 2015. He was also the producer of the videoclip of the Sammarinese song Chain Of Lights composed by Ralph Siegel.

In 2015 he also produced Michele Perniola for the New Wave 2015, fourth place in the competition.

In 2016 he was the artistic producer for Walter Ricci who won the New Wave 2016 with 425 points.

== Discography ==
=== Albums ===
- 2006 – L'amore è un'equazione

=== Singles ===
- 2006 – "Capirò Crescerai" – Sanremo Music Festival 2006
- 2006 – "L'amore è un'equazione"
- 2009 – "27 Angeli" – New Wave 2009
- 2010 – "Senza Respiro" – Russian National Contest for ESC
- 2012 – "Meraviglia Italiana"

=== Author and composer for other artists ===
Year	Title	Artist	Album
2012	"Se Vuoi" (author and composer with Costanzo Del Pinto)	Costanzo Del Pinto	New Wave 2012
2013	"Voglio Sposare Miss Italia" (author with Costanzo Del Pinto; composer with Fio Zanotti)	Costanzo Del Pinto	Amici 2013 Compilation
2013	"O-o-O Sole Intorno A me" (author with Piero Romitelli and Michele Perniola; composer with Massimiliano Messieri)	Michele Perniola	Junior Eurovision Song Contest 2013
2014	"Breaking My Heart" (author with Luca Medri and Chris Lapolla)	The Peppermints	Junior Eurovision Song Contest 2014
2015	"Panico" (author and composer with Piero Romitelli and Charlie Mason)	Michele Perniola	New Wave (competition)
2017	"The Way You Are" (author with Piero Romitelli and Charlie Mason)	Sergio Sylvestre	Sergio Sylvestre
