= San Marino in the Eurovision Song Contest 2015 =

- Eurovision Song Contest 2015
- Participating broadcaster: San Marino RTV (SMRTV)
- Country: San Marino
- Selection process: Internal selection
- Announcement date: Artist: 27 November 2014; Song: 16 March 2015

Competing entry
- Song: "Chain of Lights"
- Artist: Anita Simoncini and Michele Perniola
- Songwriters: Ralph Siegel; John O'Flynn

Placement
- Semi-final result: Failed to qualify (16th)

Participation chronology

San Marino was represented at the Eurovision Song Contest 2015, held in Vienna, Austria. The Sammarinese national broadcaster San Marino RTV (SMRTV) internally selected Anita Simoncini and Michele Perniola with "Chain of Lights" to represent the nation in the contest. Both Simoncini and Perniola had previously represented San Marino in the Junior Eurovision Song Contest on separate occasions. The 2015 entry in the Eurovision Song Contest was promoted through the creation of a music video, a tour that included a stop in Moscow and a contest on social media that awarded prizes to winning participants. San Marino performed third in the second semi-final, held on 21 May 2015, and placed 16th with 11 points, failing to qualify for the final.

== Background ==
Prior to the 2015 contest, San Marino had participated in the Eurovision Song Contest five times since their first entry in 2008. The nation's debut entry in the 2008 contest, "Complice" performed by Miodio, failed to qualify for the final and placed last in the semi-final it competed in. San Marino subsequently did not participate in both the 2009 and 2010 contests, citing financial difficulties. They returned in 2011 with Italian singer Senit performing "Stand By", which also failed to take the nation to the final. From 2012 to 2014, San Marino sent Valentina Monetta to the contest on three consecutive occasions, which made her the first singer to participate in three consecutive contests since Udo Jürgens, who competed in 1964, 1965 and 1966 for Austria. Monetta's entries in 2012 ("The Social Network Song") and 2013 ("Crisalide (Vola)") also failed to qualify San Marino to the final, however in 2014, she managed to bring the nation to the final for the first time with "Maybe", placing 24th. This marked their best placing to this point.

San Marino RTV (SMRTV) confirmed on 11 October 2014 that San Marino would participate in the Eurovision Song Contest 2015. A few weeks later, they revealed that the Sammarinese entry would once again be selected internally, continuing a practice that began with their first entry. Their intent was to announce the act sometime after San Marino's appearance in the Junior Eurovision Song Contest 2015.

== Before Eurovision ==
=== Internal selection ===
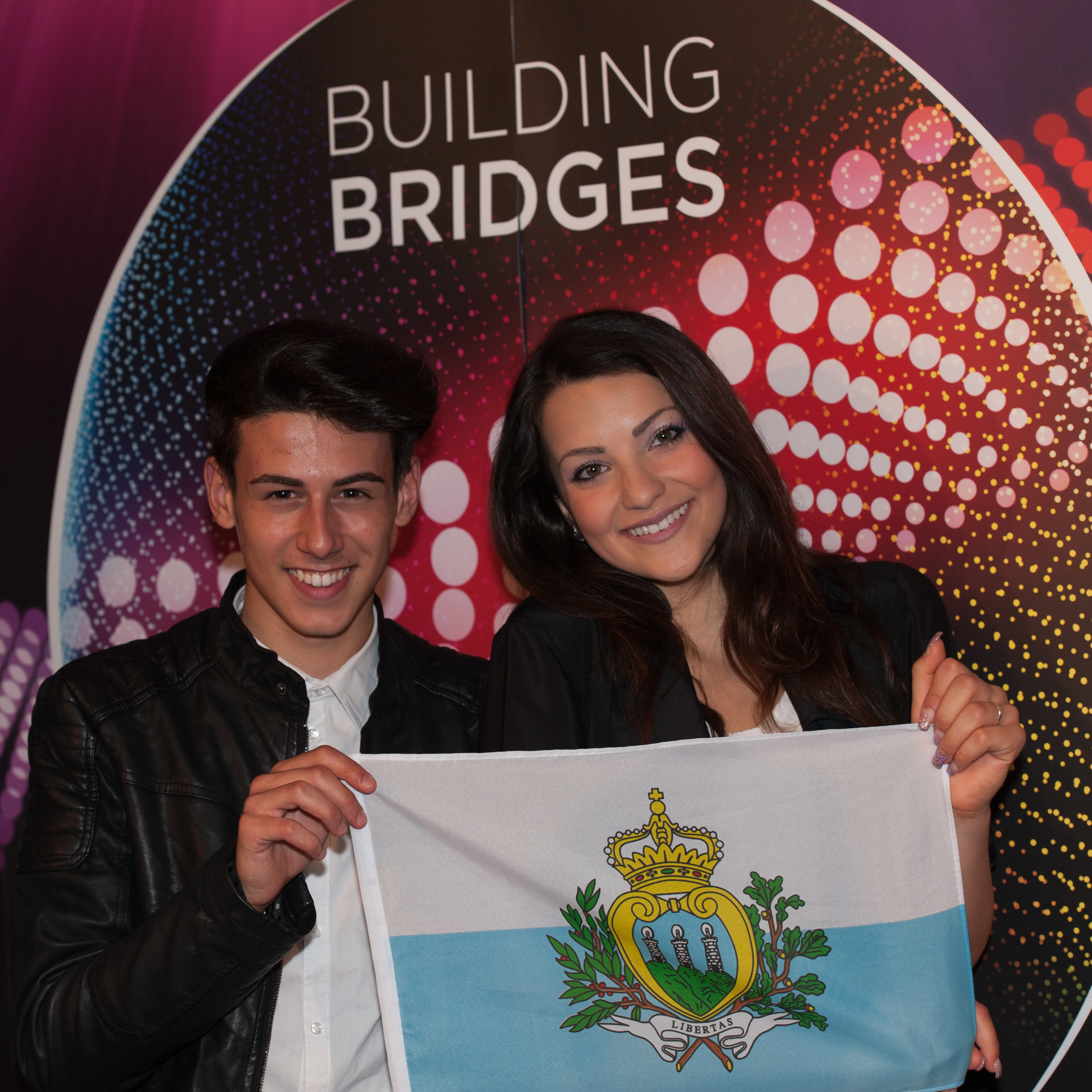
Anita Simoncini and Michele Perniola were internally selected to represent San Marino in the Eurovision Song Contest 2015.

On 27 November 2014, SMRTV held a press conference at their studio where they announced that they had internally selected singers Anita Simoncini and Michele Perniola to represent San Marino at the Eurovision Song Contest 2015. Perniola previously represented San Marino in the Junior Eurovision Song Contest 2013, while Simoncini previously represented the nation in the Junior Eurovision Song Contest 2014 as part of the group the Peppermints. Simoncini became the first artist to consecutively represent a nation in the Junior Eurovision Song Contest and the Eurovision Song Contest, as she met the age requirements for the Eurovision Song Contest on 14 April 2015 when she turned 16. Simoncini and Perniola also became the youngest duet to take part in the contest to this point.

On 16 March 2015, "Chain of Lights" was presented as the song to represent San Marino in the Eurovision Song Contest 2015. The song was composed by Ralph Siegel with lyrics by Bernd Meinunger (under the pseudonym John O'Flynn). Siegel had previously composed 23 Eurovision entries for various countries, including the previous three Sammarinese entries all performed by Valentina Monetta. Including "Chain of Lights", 18 of the entries composed by Siegel were written by Meinunger. The song was selected to represent San Marino after the broadcaster opened a submission period for composers, producers and record companies to submit proposals. In regards to the song, Siegel stated that "Chain of Lights" was not written specifically for the Eurovision Song Contest and therefore the song was shortened, rearranged and adapted to meet contest criteria after being selected. From its inception, the song was intended to be performed in English.

=== Promotion ===
To promote the entry, a music video for "Chain of Lights" directed by Fabrizio Oggiano was released as part of the song's presentation on 16 March 2015. Oggiano was selected for the role through a competition staged by the broadcaster, record label organization MEI and record label Queens Academy. The video was shot in the Molise region of southern Italy. SMRTV staged an online contest titled "Build a Chain of Lights" where social media users could use the hashtag #SanMarino2015 on posts to enter to win prizes such as a meet and greet with the artists, a promotional press kit and more. Simoncini and Perniola also embarked on a promotional tour that included a visit to Moscow, and granted interviews to the local and international press in Austria in the lead up to the contest.

== At Eurovision ==
The Eurovision Song Contest 2015 took place at Wiener Stadthalle in Vienna, Austria. It consisted of two semi-finals held on 19 and 21 May, respectively, and the final on 23 May 2015. According to Eurovision rules, all nations with the exceptions of the host country and the "Big Five", consisting of France, Germany, Italy, Spain and the United Kingdom, were required to qualify from one of two semi-finals in order to compete for the final; the top 10 countries from each semi-final progress to the final. In the 2015 contest, Australia also competed directly in the final as an invited guest nation. The European Broadcasting Union (EBU) split up the competing countries into five different pots based on voting patterns from previous 10 years. On 26 January 2015, an allocation draw was held which placed each country into one of the two semi-finals, as well as which half of the show they would perform in. San Marino was placed into the second semi-final, to be held on 21 May 2015, and was scheduled to perform in the first half of the show.

Once all the competing songs for the 2015 contest had been released, the running order for the semi-finals was decided by the shows' producers rather than through another draw, so that similar songs were not placed next to each other. San Marino was set to perform in position three, following the entry from Ireland and before the entry from Montenegro. All three shows were broadcast in San Marino on San Marino RTV and Radio San Marino with commentary by Lia Fiorio and Gigi Restivo. Valentina Monetta was the Sammarinese spokesperson who announced the nation's votes during the final.

=== Semi-final ===
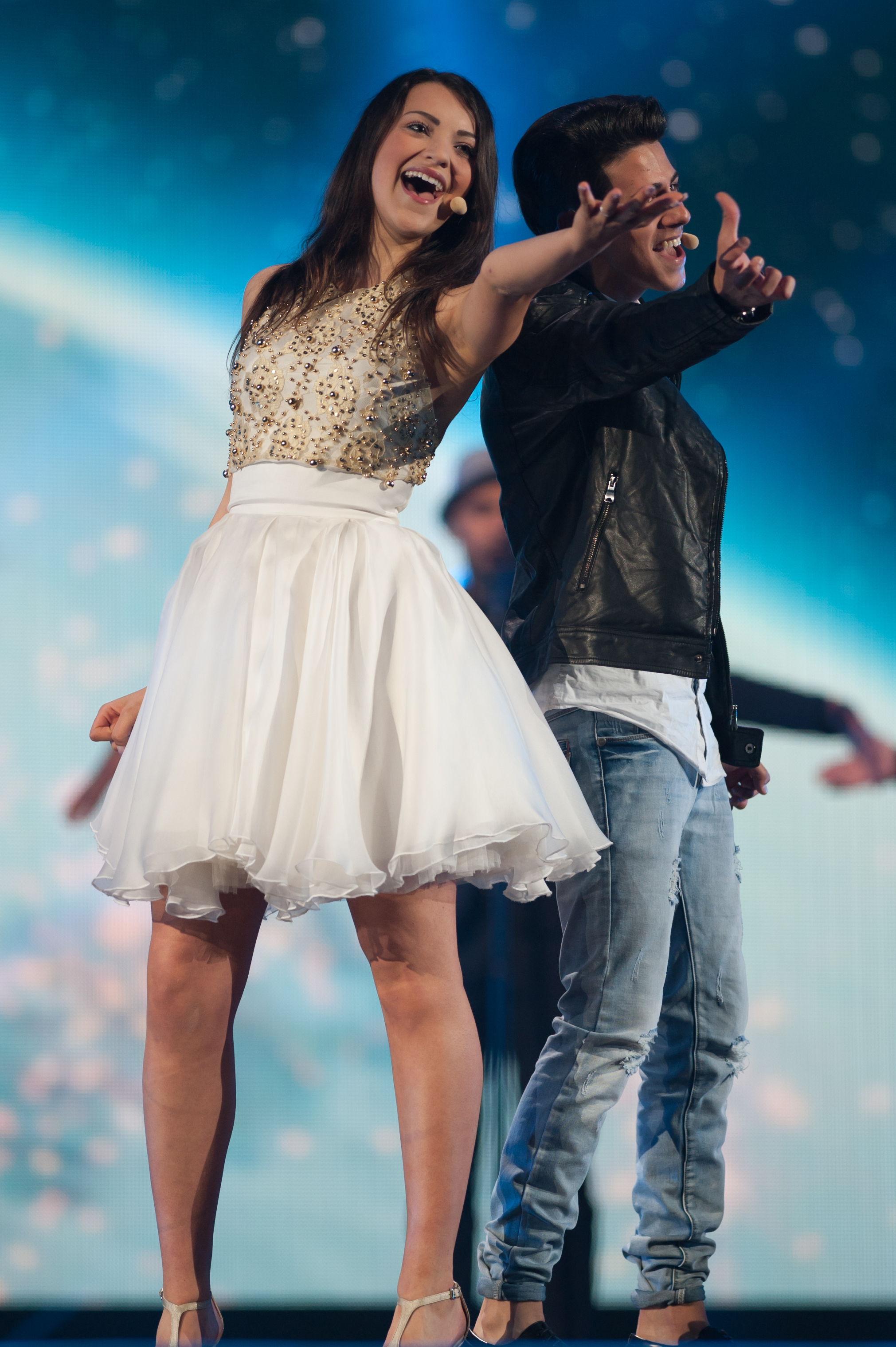
Simoncini and Perniola at a dress rehearsal for the second semi-final.

Simoncini and Perniola took part in technical rehearsals on 13 and 16 May, followed by dress rehearsals on 20 and 21 May 2015. This included the jury final where professional juries of each country, typically responsible for 50 percent of each country's vote, watched and voted on the competing entries.

Antonello Carozza was the artistic director for the performance. The stage show featured Simoncini wearing a gold and white skirt and Perniola dressed in a white shirt, jeans and a black leather jacket. The duet performed choreographed movements on stage with four backing vocalists behind them dressed in black: Katrin Schild von Spannenberg, Pat Lawson, Ron van Lankeren and Julian Feifel. The background LED screens displayed a rotating planet Earth that became covered in candles, forming chains around the world.

At the end of the show, San Marino failed to qualify for the final and was not announced among the top 10 nations. It was later revealed that San Marino placed 16th in the semi-final, receiving a total of 11 points.

=== Voting ===
Voting during the three shows consisted of 50 percent public televoting and 50 percent from a jury deliberation. The jury consisted of five music industry professionals who were citizens of the country they represent, with their names published before the contest. This jury were asked to judge each contestant based on: vocal capacity; the stage performance; the song's composition and originality; and the overall impression by the act. In addition, no member of a national jury could be related in any way to any of the competing acts in such a way that they cannot vote impartially and independently. The individual rankings of each jury member were released shortly after the final. San Marino does not organise a televote due to their use of Italy's phone system and how the small number of televoters would struggle to meet the minimum voting threshold. Therefore, in the second semi-final and the final, the Sammarinese votes were based solely on jury voting.

Following the release of the full split voting by the EBU after the conclusion of the competition, it was revealed that San Marino had placed 15th with the public televote and 17th (last) with the jury vote in the second semi-final. In the public vote, San Marino scored 16 points, while with the jury vote, the nation scored six points.

Below is a breakdown of points awarded to San Marino and awarded by San Marino in the contest's second semi-final and final, respectively, and the breakdown of the jury voting conducted during the two shows:

==== Points awarded to San Marino ====
Points awarded to San Marino (Semi-final 2)
Score	Country
12 points	
10 points	
8 points	
7 points	
6 points	Italy
5 points	Montenegro
4 points	
3 points	
2 points	
1 point	

==== Points awarded by San Marino ====
Points awarded by San Marino (Semi-final 2)
Score	Country
12 points	Sweden
10 points	Latvia
8 points	Norway
7 points	Malta
6 points	Israel
5 points	Ireland
4 points	Czech Republic
3 points	Lithuania
2 points	Cyprus
1 point	Slovenia

Points awarded by San Marino (Final)
Score	Country
12 points	Latvia
10 points	Italy
8 points	Australia
7 points	Sweden
6 points	Norway
5 points	Belgium
4 points	Hungary
3 points	United Kingdom
2 points	Israel
1 point	France

==== Detailed voting results ====
The following members comprised the Sammarinese jury:

- Barbara Andreini (jury chairperson) – opera singer, teacher
- Ilaria Ercolani – singer
- Katalin Pribelszki – opera singer
- Matteo Venturini (Duan) – DJ
- Nicola Della Valle – singer, represented San Marino in the 2008 contest as part of Miodio

Detailed voting results from San Marino (Semi-final 2)
R/O	Country	B. Andreini	I. Ercolani	K. Pribelszki	Duan	N. Della Valle	Jury Rank	Points
01	Lithuania	15	7	7	7	10	8	3
02	Ireland	7	14	9	5	5	6	5
03	San Marino							
04	Montenegro	6	6	8	16	14	11	
05	Malta	5	1	10	4	4	4	7
06	Norway	4	3	11	3	3	3	8
07	Portugal	14	9	16	15	15	16	
08	Czech Republic	9	10	5	8	13	7	4
09	Israel	2	5	1	13	6	5	6
10	Latvia	3	2	6	2	1	2	10
11	Azerbaijan	12	13	4	14	9	12	
12	Iceland	16	12	14	11	11	15	
13	Sweden	1	4	2	1	2	1	12
14	Switzerland	11	8	13	12	12	13	
15	Cyprus	8	16	12	6	7	9	2
16	Slovenia	13	15	3	10	8	10	1
17	Poland	10	11	15	9	16	14	

Detailed voting results from San Marino (Final)
R/O	Country	B. Andreini	I. Ercolani	K. Pribelszki	Duan	N. Della Valle	Jury Rank	Points
01	Slovenia	22	16	2	17	9	11	
02	France	5	12	25	11	8	10	1
03	Israel	18	8	6	16	10	9	2
04	Estonia	26	27	27	15	21	26	
05	United Kingdom	8	7	9	8	24	8	3
06	Armenia	11	24	19	19	23	20	
07	Lithuania	21	15	12	9	11	12	
08	Serbia	25	13	8	25	6	15	
09	Norway	6	5	14	4	2	5	6
10	Sweden	7	4	1	3	5	4	7
11	Cyprus	24	17	26	13	20	23	
12	Australia	3	1	7	1	4	3	8
13	Belgium	4	6	17	5	7	6	5
14	Austria	20	22	10	7	14	14	
15	Greece	19	14	13	24	27	21	
16	Montenegro	17	10	16	27	18	19	
17	Germany	23	20	18	12	25	22	
18	Poland	14	18	22	22	26	24	
19	Latvia	2	3	4	2	1	1	12
20	Romania	16	23	23	23	22	25	
21	Spain	12	11	21	14	13	13	
22	Hungary	9	19	5	10	12	7	4
23	Georgia	10	9	20	21	19	16	
24	Azerbaijan	13	21	15	18	15	17	
25	Russia	15	25	11	20	16	18	
26	Albania	27	26	24	26	17	27	
27	Italy	1	2	3	6	3	2	10
