= The Voice (Russian TV series) season 6 =

The Voice
- Season 6
- Presented by: Dmitry Nagiev
- Coaches: Dima Bilan; Pelageya; Alexander Gradsky; Leonid Agutin
- Winner: Selim Alakhyarov
- Winning coach: Alexander Gradsky
- Runner-up: Timofey Kopylov

Release
- Original network: Channel One
- Original release: September 1 – December 29, 2017

Season chronology
- ← Previous; Season 5 Next → Season 7

The sixth season of the Russian reality talent show The Voice premiered on September 1, 2017, on Channel One. Dmitry Nagiev returned as the show's presenter. Dima Bilan and Leonid Agutin returned as coaches, while Pelageya returned after two season hiatus alongside Alexander Gradsky who returned after a one-season break. Selim Alakhyarov was announced as the winner of the season, marking Alexander Gradsky's fourth and final win as a coach, and making him the third one-chair turn artist to win, following Dina Garipova in season 1 and Hieromonk Fotiy in season 4. For the first time ever, the final three artists were all male.

== Coaches and presenter ==
The Voice season 6 coaching panel

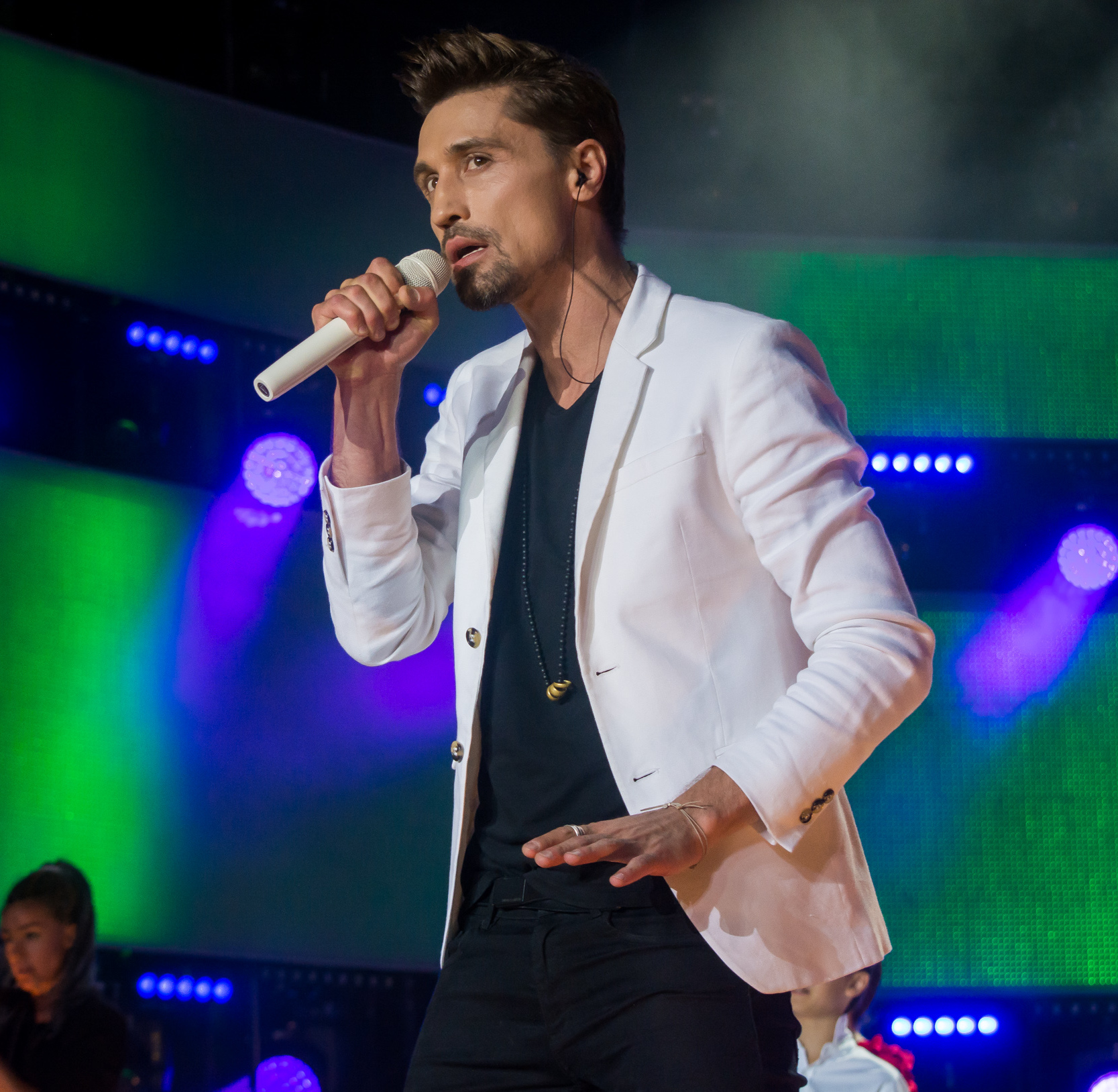
Dima Bilan

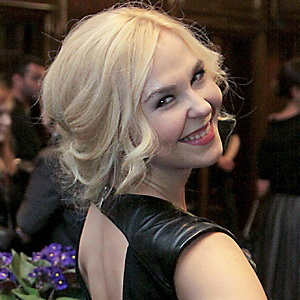
Pelageya

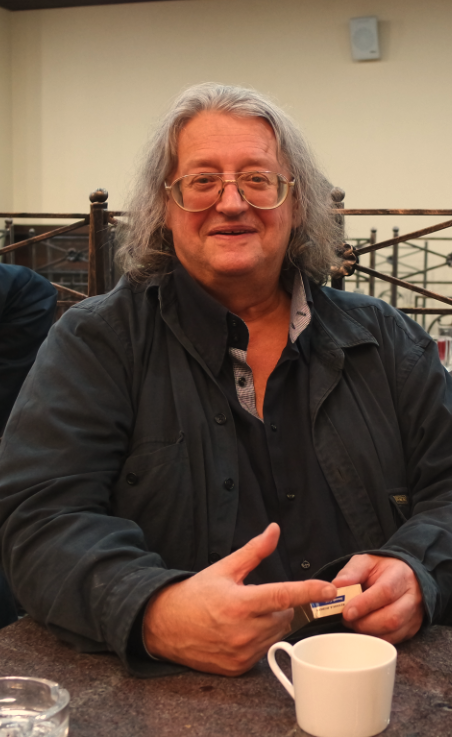
Alexander Gradsky

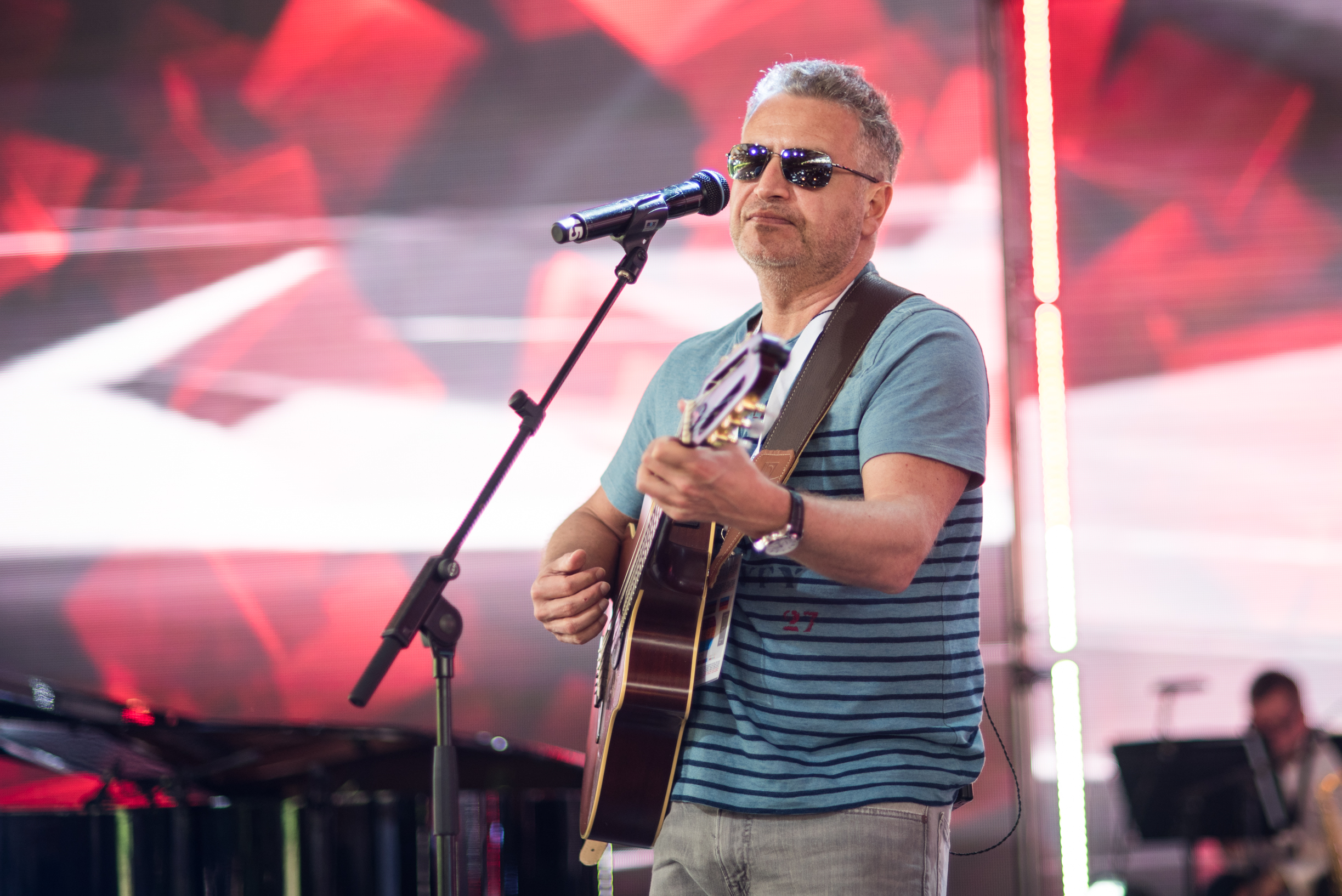
Leonid Agutin

On August 13, 2017, Channel One announced that Dima Bilan (his 5th season), Pelageya (her 4th season), Alexander Gradsky (his 5th season), and Leonid Agutin (his 5th season) became coaches in the sixth season.

Dmitry Nagiev returned for his 6th season as a presenter.

== Teams ==
Colour key

- Winner
- Runner-up
- Third place
- Fourth place
- Eliminated in the Semifinal
- Eliminated in the Quarterfinals
- Eliminated in the Knockout rounds
- Stolen in the Battle rounds
- Eliminated in the Battle rounds

Coaches	Top 56 artists					
Dima Bilan						
Dima Bilan	Yang Ge	Danil Buranov	FolkBeat	Nina Shatskaya	Anastasia Zorina	Yulia Valeeva
Dima Bilan	Arseniy Borodin	Anastasia Belyavskaya	Maria Kabashova	~~Brandon Stone~~	Albina Yusupova	Leonsia Erdenko
Dima Bilan	Anna Prosekina	Dima Veber	Alexander Kazakov	Zaharchenko Brothers		
Pelageya						
Pelageya	Ladislav Bubnar	Anton Lavrentev	Antonello Carozza	Alla Meunargia	Alexey Safiulin †	Dave Dario
Pelageya	Ekaterina Trubilina	Mishel Mstoyan	Alexander Ogorodnikov	Dmitry Karanevskiy	Iyulina Popova	Vasilina Gorozhankina
Pelageya	Anait Pogosyan	Filip Balzano	Evgenia Romanes	Eka Dzhanelidze		
Alexander Gradsky						
Alexander Gradsky	Selim Alakhyarov	Lora Gorbunova	Pavel Ivanov	Gabriel Kupatadze	Sofya Onopchenko	Natalya Gerasimova
Alexander Gradsky	Svetlana Syropyatova	Marianna Savon	Olika Gromova	~~Oksana Voytovich~~	Zaali Sarkisyan	Anna Kadysheva
Alexander Gradsky	Nadezhda Kolesnikova	Dmitry Yankovskiy	Vitaliy Selyutin	Aldona Tskua		
Leonid Agutin						
Leonid Agutin	Timofey Kopylov	Brandon Stone	David Todua	Viktoria Olize	Mikhail Grishunov	Vyacheslav Zadorozhny
Leonid Agutin	Oksana Voytovich	Yasmani Silva	Diana Shalzhiyan	~~Ekaterina Trubilina~~	~~Gabriel Kupatadze~~	~~Yulia Valeeva~~
Leonid Agutin	~~Maria Kabashova~~	~~Dave Dario~~	~~Olika Gromova~~	Darya Vinokurova		
Note: Italicized names are stolen contestans (names struck through within former names).

== Blind auditions ==
Colour key

✔	Coach pressed "I WANT YOU" button
✔	Coach pressed "I WANT YOU" button, despite the lack of places in his/her team
	Artist defaulted to a coach's team
	Artist picked a coach's team
	Artist eliminated with no coach pressing their button

=== Episode 1 (Sep. 1) ===
The contestants of "The Voice Kids" and the coaches performed "Another Brick in the Wall (Part 2)" at the start of the show.

Order	Artist	Age	Origin	Song	Coach's and artist's choices			
Order	Artist	Age	Origin	Song	Bilan	Pelageya	Gradsky	Agutin
1	Oleg Schutskiy	24	Minsk, Belarus	"Самая-самая" / "Невеста"	—	—	—	—
2	Anastasia Belyavskaya	18	Moscow	"Cryin'"	✔	—	—	—
3	Anton Lavrentev	33	Moscow	"Way Down We Go"	—	✔	—	✔
4	Anna Prosekina	24	Tomsk, Tomsk oblast	"Революция"	✔	—	—	✔
5	Maksim Sidorov	30	Moscow	"Смуглянка"	—	—	—	—
6	Diana Shalzhiyan	25	Goryachy Klyuch, Krasnodar Krai	"Spain"	✔	—	✔	✔
7	Ladislav Bubnar	33	Prague, Czech Republic	"Скрипка Паганини"	✔	✔	—	—
8	Regina Panina	25	Tomsk, Tomsk oblast	"Я выбираю тебя"	—	—	—	—
9	Aldona Tskua	30	Sukhumi, Georgia	"Lauretta's Aria"	✔	—	✔	—
10	Alexander Kazakov	36	Riga, Latvia	"Молитва Франсуа Вийона"	✔	—	—	—
11	Darya Ivanovskaya	25	Samara, Samara oblast	"I Will Survive"	—	—	—	—
12	Alexander Ogorodnikov	26	Kemerovo, Kemerovo oblast	"Smells Like Teen Spirit"	✔	✔	✔	✔

=== Episode 2 (Sep. 8) ===
Order	Artist	Age	Origin	Song	Coach's and artist's choices			
Order	Artist	Age	Origin	Song	Bilan	Pelageya	Gradsky	Agutin
1	Timofey Kopylov	40	Vladimir, Vladimir oblast	"Шукария"	—	—	—	✔
2	Lora Gorbunova	29	Khabarovsk, Khabarovsk krai	"La Vie en rose"	—	—	✔	—
3	Lika Rulla	45	Moscow	"Весь этот джаз"	—	—	—	—
4	Yasmani Silva	29	Khibara, Cuba	"Despacito"	—	—	✔	✔
5	Alla Meunargia	31	Saratov, Saratov oblast	"Зима в сердце"	—	✔	—	✔
6	Pavel Ivanov	31	Rybinsk, Yaroslavl oblast	"Скажите, девушки"	—	—	✔	—
7	Maria Klishina	30	Moscow	"На Титанике"	—	—	—	—
8	Mikhail Grishunov	29	Moscow	"Thinking Out Loud"	✔	✔	✔	✔
9	Veronika Shabashova	34	Voronezh, Voronezh oblast	"Dream On"	—	—	—	—
10	Leonsia Erdenko	45	Moscow	"Голубчик"	✔	✔	—	✔
11	Andrey Tskhay	36	Tikhvin, Leningrad oblast	"Спаси меня"	—	—	—	—
12	Svetlana Syropyatova	23	Izhevsk, Udmurtia	"One Night Only"	—	—	✔	—

=== Episode 3 (Sep. 15) ===
Note: Basta and Polina Gagarina, former coaches of The Voice, made a special performance with the Eminem's song "Stan" in this episode. Only Leonid turned for them.

Order	Artist	Age	Origin	Song	Coach's and artist's choices			
Order	Artist	Age	Origin	Song	Bilan	Pelageya	Gradsky	Agutin
1	David Todua	37	Moscow	"Who Wants to Live Forever"	✔	✔	✔	✔
2	Anna Goncharova	28	Serpukhov, Moscow oblast	"Каким ты был"	—	—	—	—
3	Danil Buranov	23	Zelenodolsk, Tatarstan	"Внеорбитные"	✔	—	—	✔
4	Darya Vinokurova	36	Pavlodar, Kazakhstan	"Canzone da due soldi"	—	—	—	✔
5	Marianna Savon	29	Moscow	"Black or White"	—	—	✔	—
6	Alexey Safiulin	42	Moscow	"Прощай, радость"	—	✔	—	—
7	Alexandra Milu	27	Moscow	"Я искала тебя"	—	—	—	—
8	Dima Veber	28	Kursk, Kursk oblast	"Часы"	✔	—	—	—
9	Nadezhda Kolesnikova	34	Voronezh, Voronezh oblast / Florence, Italy	"Куплеты Адели"	—	—	✔	—
10	Igor Vorozhtsov	31	Kazan, Tatarstan	"Лётчик"	—	—	—	—
11	Olika Gromova	21	Moscow	"It Don't Mean a Thing"	✔	—	—	✔

=== Episode 4 (Sep. 22) ===
Order	Artist	Age	Origin	Song	Coach's and artist's choices			
Order	Artist	Age	Origin	Song	Bilan	Pelageya	Gradsky	Agutin
1	Selim Alakhyarov	29	Makhachkala, Dagestan	"Чёртово колесо"	—	—	✔	—
2	Yang Ge	28	Moscow / Beijing, China	"Come Together"	✔	—	—	—
3	Anait Pogosyan	26	Erevan, Armenia / Moscow	"Ласточка"	✔	✔	✔	✔
4	Vyacheslav Zadorozhny	24	Pyt-Yakh, Yugra	"Iron Sky"	—	✔	—	✔
5	Vadim Beloglazov	26	Kaliningrad, Kaliningrad oblast	"Туманы"	—	—	—	—
6	Arseniy Borodin	28	Barnaul, Altai krai	"Stop!"	✔	✔	—	✔
7	Yulia Valeeva	39	Sarapul, Udmurtia	"Музыки осталось мало"	—	—	—	✔
8	Alla Seidalieva	33	Samarkand, Uzbekistan	"Alarm"	—	—	—	—
9	Kristian Kaseru	31	Tallinn, Estonia	"Подберу музыку"	—	—	—	—
10	Albina Yusupova	25	Elabuga, Tatarstan	"Ne me quitte pas"	✔	—	—	—
11	Alexander Yagya	49	Moscow	"Скажи, зачем любовь"	—	—	—	—
12	Evgenia Romanes	19	Moscow	"Wicked Game"	—	✔	—	—

=== Episode 5 (Sep. 29) ===
Order	Artist	Age	Origin	Song	Coach's and artist's choices			
Order	Artist	Age	Origin	Song	Bilan	Pelageya	Gradsky	Agutin
1	Oksana Voytovich	23	Voronezh, Voronezh oblast	"Ты снишься мне"	—	—	✔	✔
2	Philip Balzano	60	New York, United States	"Hotel California"	✔	✔	✔	✔
3	Maria Zykina	38	Moscow	"Tombe la neige"	—	—	—	—
4	Zakharchenko Brothers (Denis & Maksim Zakharchenko)	25/25	Zhovti Vody, Ukraine	"Happy"	✔	—	—	—
5	Yana Koshkina	27	Saint Petersburg	"Шопен"	—	—	—	—
6	Brandon Stone	37	Berlin, Germany / Moscow	"My Baby You"	✔	—	—	✔
7	Vasilina Gorozhankina	24	Bogovarovo, Kostroma oblast	"Дороженька"	—	✔	—	—
8	Artur Arzhakov	22	Novosibirsk, Novosibirsk oblast	"Полетели"	—	—	—	—
9	Ekaterina Trubilina	22	Pushkino, Moscow oblast	"Love On The Brain"	—	—	—	✔
10	Vitaliy Selyutin	33	Moscow	"Kavaradossi's Aria"	—	—	✔	—
11	Svetlana Artemeva	41	Sergiev Posad, Moscow oblast	"Mercy, Mercy, Mercy"	—	—	—	—
12	Anastasia Zorina	28	Krasnogorsk, Moscow Oblast	"Расскажите, птицы"	✔	—	—	—

=== Episode 6 (Oct. 6) ===
Order	Artist	Age	Origin	Song	Coach's and artist's choices			
Order	Artist	Age	Origin	Song	Bilan	Pelageya	Gradsky	Agutin
1	Artyom Ulanov	41	Saint Petersburg	"Никто не услышит"	—	—	—	—
2	Viktoria Olize	26	Kyiv, Ukraine	"Long Train Running"	✔	✔	✔	✔
3	Lika Ramus	34	Snezhinsk, Chelyabinsk oblast	"What's Up?"	—	—	—	—
4	Dmitry Karanevskiy	24	Velikie Luki, Pskov oblast	"Почему, отчего"	—	✔	—	—
5	Nina Shatskaya	51	Rybinsk, Yaroslavl oblast	"Очаровательные глазки"	✔	—	—	—
6	Eka Dzhanelidze	30	Ukhta, Komi Republic	"Thriller"	—	✔	—	—
7	Iyulina Popova	24	Yakutsk, Sakha Republic	"Импульсы"	—	✔	—	—
8	Dave Dario	35	Quatre Bornes, Mauritius	"Angels"	—	✔	✔	✔
9	Dmitry Yankovskiy	30	Saint Petersburg	"Белые розы"	—	—	✔	—
10	Nino Ninidze	26	Moscow	"Одно и то же"	—	—	—	—
11	Natalya Gerasimova	29	Ramenskoye, Moscow Oblast	"Summertime"	—	—	✔	—
12	Pavel Eliseev	24	Labytnangi, Yamalo-Nenets	"Кружит"	—	—	—	—

=== Episode 7 (Oct. 13) ===
Order	Artist	Age	Origin	Song	Coach's and artist's choices			
Order	Artist	Age	Origin	Song	Bilan	Pelageya	Gradsky	Agutin
1	Gabriel Kupatadze	39	Minsk, Belarus	"Bensonhurst Blues"	—	✔	—	✔
2	FolkBeat (Svetlana Ivanova & Maria Zibrova)	28/29	Moscow	"Сама иду"	✔	—	—	—
3	Yury Titov	32	Moscow	"Oh, Lady Be Good!"	Team full	—	—	—
4	Alevtina Sergeeva	35	Koryazhma, Arkhangelsk oblast	"Родина"	Team full	—	—	—
5	Antonello Carozza	32	Campobasso, Italy	"Il mondo"	Team full	✔	—	✔
6	Ivan Vakhrushev	24	Strizhi, Kirov oblast	"Океанами стали"	Team full	—	—	—
7	Sofya Onopchenko	21	Voronezh, Voronezh oblast	"Люблю тебя"	Team full	✔	✔	—
8	Zaali Sarkisyan	28	Rostov-on-Don, Rostov oblast	"Alejate"	Team full	—	✔	—
9	Anna Kadysheva	20	Syzran, Samara oblast	"Goodbye (Shelter)"	Team full	—	✔	—
10	Irina Bratusyova	24	Lysogorskaya, Stavropol krai	"We Can Work It Out"	Team full	—	Team full	—
11	Maria Kabashova	27	Vaskovo, Arkhangelsk oblast	"Стану солнцем"	Team full	—	Team full	✔
12	Mishel Mstoyan	21	Moscow	"How Do You Keep the Music Playing?"	Team full	✔	✔	Team full

== The Battles ==
The Battles round started with episode 8 and ended with episode 11 (broadcast on October 20, 27, 2017; on November 3, 10, 2017). The coaches can steal two losing artists from another coach. Contestants who win their battle or are stolen by another coach will advance to the Knockout rounds.

Colour key

Artist won the Battle and advanced to the Knockouts
Artist lost the Battle but was stolen by another coach and advanced to the Knockouts
Artist lost the Battle and was eliminated

Episode	Coach	No.	Winner	Song	Loser	'Steal' result			
Episode	Coach	No.	Winner	Song	Loser	Bilan	Pelageya	Gradsky	Agutin
Episode 8 (October 20)	Leonid Agutin	1	Diana Shalzhiyan	"Хорошие девчата"	Olika Gromova	—	—	✔	—N/a
Episode 8 (October 20)	Alexander Gradsky	2	Natalya Gerasimova	"Barcelona"	Vitality Selyutin	—	—	—N/a	—
Episode 8 (October 20)	Dima Bilan	3	FolkBeat	"Ой, то не вечер"	Zaharchenko Brothers	—N/a	—	—	—
Episode 8 (October 20)	Pelageya	4	Alla Meunargia	"Sax"	Eka Dzhanelidze	—	—N/a	—	—
Episode 8 (October 20)	Alexander Gradsky	5	Selim Alakhyarov	"Не исчезай"	Aldona Tskua	—	—	—N/a	—
Episode 8 (October 20)	Leonid Agutin	6	David Todua	"Don't Let the Sun Go Down on Me"	Dave Dario	—	✔	—	—N/a
Episode 8 (October 20)	Dima Bilan	7	Anastasia Zorina	"Самолёт"	Alexander Kazakov	—N/a	—	—	—
Episode 9 (October 27)	Leonid Agutin	1	Viktoria Olize	"Shame, Shame, Shame"	Maria Kabashova	✔	—	✔	—N/a
Episode 9 (October 27)	Alexander Gradsky	2	Svetlana Syropyatova	"Голубой щенок"	Dmitry Yankovskiy	—	—	—N/a	—
Episode 9 (October 27)	Dima Bilan	3	Danil Buranov	"Omen"	Dima Veber	—N/a	—	—	—
Episode 9 (October 27)	Pelageya	4	Anton Lavrentev	"Эхо любви"	Evgenia Romanes	—	—N/a	—	—
Episode 9 (October 27)	Alexander Gradsky	5	Sofya Onopchenko	"That's Life"	Oksana Voytovich	—	—	—N/a	✔
Episode 9 (October 27)	Leonid Agutin	6	Yasmani Silva	"Тут и там"	Yulia Valeeva	✔	—	—	—N/a
Episode 9 (October 27)	Pelageya	7	Alexander Ogorodnikov	"Burn"	Filip Balzano	Team full	—N/a	—	—
Episode 10 (November 3)	Pelageya	1	Ladislav Bubnar	"Più che puoi"	Anait Pogosyan	Team full	—N/a	—	—
Episode 10 (November 3)	Alexander Gradsky	2	Pavel Ivanov	"Я вас не знал"	Nadezhda Kolesnikova	Team full	—	—N/a	—
Episode 10 (November 3)	Leonid Agutin	3	Vyacheslav Zadorozhny	"Hip to Be Square"	Gabriel Kupatadze	Team full	—	✔	—N/a
Episode 10 (November 3)	Pelageya	4	Mishel Mstoyan	"Под музыку Вивальди"	Vasilina Gorozhankina	Team full	—N/a	Team full	—
Episode 10 (November 3)	Alexander Gradsky	5	Lora Gorbunova	"На тот большак"	Anna Kadysheva	Team full	—	Team full	—
Episode 10 (November 3)	Dima Bilan	6	Arseniy Borodin	"Attention"	Brandon Stone	Team full	✔	Team full	✔
Episode 10 (November 3)	Dima Bilan	7	Anastasia Belyavskaya	"Утекай"	Anna Prosekina	Team full	—	Team full	Team full
Episode 11 (November 10)	Leonid Agutin	1	Timofey Kopylov	"Вот пуля просвистела"	Darya Vinokurova	Team full	—	Team full	Team full
Episode 11 (November 10)	Pelageya	2	Antonello Karozza	"The Final Countdown"	Iyulina Popova	Team full	—N/a	Team full	Team full
Episode 11 (November 10)	Dima Bilan	3	Yang Ge	"Мне нравится"	Leonsia Erdenko	Team full	—	Team full	Team full
Episode 11 (November 10)	Alexander Gradsky	4	Marianna Savon	"Vivo per lei"	Zaali Sarkisyan	Team full	—	Team full	Team full
Episode 11 (November 10)	Dima Bilan	5	Nina Shatskaya	"Oblivion"	Albina Yusupova	Team full	—	Team full	Team full
Episode 11 (November 10)	Pelageya	6	Alexey Safiulin	"Красиво"	Dmitry Karanevskiy	Team full	—N/a	Team full	Team full
Episode 11 (November 10)	Leonid Agutin	7	Mikhail Grishunov	"Беги по небу"	Ekaterina Trubilina	Team full	✔	Team full	Team full

== The Knockouts ==
The Knockouts round started with episode 12 and ended with episode 14 (broadcast on November 17, 24, 2017; on December 1, 2017). The top 24 contestants will then move on to the "Live Shows."

Colour key

Artist won the Knockout and advanced to the Live shows
Artist lost the Knockout and was eliminated

Episode	Coach	Order	Song	Artists		Song
Episode	Coach	Order	Song	Winners	Loser	Song
Episode 12 (November 17)	Pelageya	1	"Blurred Lines"	Anton Lavrentev	Alexander Ogorodnikov	"Снег"
Episode 12 (November 17)	Pelageya	1	"Bohemian Rhapsody" / "We Are the Champions"/ "Somebody to Love"	Antonello Karocca	Alexander Ogorodnikov	"Снег"
Episode 12 (November 17)	Alexander Gradsky	2	"Come prima"	Pavel Ivanov	Olika Gromova	"Зеркало"
Episode 12 (November 17)	Alexander Gradsky	2	"With a Little Help from My Friends"	Gabriel Kupatadze	Olika Gromova	"Зеркало"
Episode 12 (November 17)	Leonid Agutin	3	"Бах творит"	David Todua	Diana Shalzhiyan	"Он был старше неё"
Episode 12 (November 17)	Leonid Agutin	3	"Versace on the Floor"	Mikhail Grishunov	Diana Shalzhiyan	"Он был старше неё"
Episode 12 (November 17)	Dima Bilan	4	"She Has No Time"	Anastasia Zorina	Maria Kabashova	"Hold It Don't Drop It"
Episode 12 (November 17)	Dima Bilan	4	"Бедный Лазарь"	FolkBeat	Maria Kabashova	"Hold It Don't Drop It"
Episode 13 (November 24)	Leonid Agutin	1	"Летний дождь"	Viktoria Olize	Yasmani Silva	"The Rhythm Is Magic"
Episode 13 (November 24)	Leonid Agutin	1	"Fly Away"	Vyacheslav Zadorozhny	Yasmani Silva	"The Rhythm Is Magic"
Episode 13 (November 24)	Alexander Gradsky	2	"У мене е щастя"	Sofya Onopchenko	Marianna Savon	"Журчат ручьи"
Episode 13 (November 24)	Alexander Gradsky	2	"Ария Дивы Плавалгуны"	Natalya Gerasimova	Marianna Savon	"Журчат ручьи"
Episode 13 (November 24)	Pelageya	3	"SOS d'un terrain en détresse"	Dave Dario	Mishel Mstoyan	"Не плачь"
Episode 13 (November 24)	Pelageya	3	"Метелица"	Ladislav Bubnar	Mishel Mstoyan	"Не плачь"
Episode 13 (November 24)	Dima Bilan	4	"Колдунья"	Nina Shatskaya	Anastasia Belyavskaya	"I Want to Break Free"
Episode 13 (November 24)	Dima Bilan	4	"Castle in the Snow"	Yang Ge	Anastasia Belyavskaya	"I Want to Break Free"
Episode 14 (December 1)	Dima Bilan	1	"Grace Kelly"	Danil Buranov	Arseniy Borodin	"Последнее письмо"
Episode 14 (December 1)	Dima Bilan	1	"Мы разбиваемся"	Yulia Valeeva	Arseniy Borodin	"Последнее письмо"
Episode 14 (December 1)	Leonid Agutin	2	"Historia de un Amor"	Brandon Stone	Oksana Voytovich	"Высоко"
Episode 14 (December 1)	Leonid Agutin	2	"Million Reasons"	Timofey Kopylov	Oksana Voytovich	"Высоко"
Episode 14 (December 1)	Pelageya	3	"Элегия"	Alexey Safiulin	Ekaterina Trubilina	"Roar"
Episode 14 (December 1)	Pelageya	3	"Смятение"	Alla Meunargia	Ekaterina Trubilina	"Roar"
Episode 14 (December 1)	Alexander Gradsky	4	"Audition (The Fools Who Dream)"	Lora Gorbunova	Svetlana Syropyatova	"Баллада Анжелы"
Episode 14 (December 1)	Alexander Gradsky	4	"You're My World"	Selim Alakhyarov	Svetlana Syropyatova	"Баллада Анжелы"

== Live shows ==
Colour key

Artist was saved
Artist was eliminated

=== Week 1: Quarterfinal 1 (December 8) ===
The first 12 artists of the Top 24 performed on December 8, 2017. The two artists from each team with fewest votes left the competition by the end of the night.

Episode	Coach	Order	Artist	Song	Coach's vote (/100%)	Public's vote (/100%)	Votes' summa	Result
Episode 15 (December 8)	Pelageya	1	Ladislav Bubnar	"Московский бит"	30%	47.6%	77.6%	Advanced
Episode 15 (December 8)	Pelageya	2	Dave Dario	"Englishman in New York"	20%	27%	57%	Eliminated
Episode 15 (December 8)	Pelageya	3	Alexey Safiulin	"Susanna"	50%	25.4%	75.4%	Eliminated
Episode 15 (December 8)	Alexander Gradsky	4	Natalya Gerasimova	"Perfume"	20%	8.9%	28.9%	Eliminated
Episode 15 (December 8)	Alexander Gradsky	5	Lora Gorbunova	"Панамки"	50%	61.1%	111.1%	Advanced
Episode 15 (December 8)	Alexander Gradsky	6	Sofya Onopchenko	"I Have Nothing"	30%	30%	60%	Eliminated
Episode 15 (December 8)	Leonid Agutin	7	Vyacheslav Zadorozhny	"Без бою"	20%	13.1%	33.1%	Eliminated
Episode 15 (December 8)	Leonid Agutin	8	Mikhail Grishunov	"For Your Love"	30%	16.4%	46.4%	Eliminated
Episode 15 (December 8)	Leonid Agutin	9	Brandon Stone	"Мамины глаза"	50%	70.5%	120.5%	Advanced
Episode 15 (December 8)	Dima Bilan	10	Danil Buranov	"Лимбо"	50%	25.4%	75.4%	Advanced
Episode 15 (December 8)	Dima Bilan	11	Yulia Valeeva	"Heavy Cross"	20%	36.2%	56.2%	Eliminated
Episode 15 (December 8)	Dima Bilan	12	Anastasia Zorina	"Полароид"	30%	38.4%	68.4%	Eliminated

=== Week 2: Quarterfinal 2 (December 15) ===
The second 12 artists of the Top 24 performed on December 15, 2017. Two artists from each team with the fewest votes left the competition by the end of the night.

Episode	Coach	Order	Artist	Song	Coach's vote (/100%)	Public's vote (/100%)	Votes' summa	Result
Episode 16 (December 15)	Alexander Gradsky	1	Pavel Ivanov	"Эти глаза напротив"	50%	23.3%	73.3%	Eliminated
Episode 16 (December 15)	Alexander Gradsky	2	Selim Alakhyarov	"Три года ты мне снилась"	30%	69.7%	99.7%	Advanced
Episode 16 (December 15)	Alexander Gradsky	3	Gabriel Kupatadze	"Я хочу понять"	20%	7%	27%	Eliminated
Episode 16 (December 15)	Leonid Agutin	4	Viktoria Olize	"Every Breath You Take"	30%	11.5%	41.5%	Eliminated
Episode 16 (December 15)	Leonid Agutin	5	Timofey Kopylov	"Кукушка"	50%	66.5%	116.5%	Advanced
Episode 16 (December 15)	Leonid Agutin	6	David Todua	"Bohemian Rhapsody"	20%	22%	42%	Eliminated
Episode 16 (December 15)	Dima Bilan	7	FolkBeat	"Ворона"	20%	31.6%	51.6%	Eliminated
Episode 16 (December 15)	Dima Bilan	8	Yang Ge	"Без тебя"	50%	37.9%	87.9%	Advanced
Episode 16 (December 15)	Dima Bilan	9	Nina Shatskaya	"Sweet Dreams"	30%	30.5%	60.5%	Eliminated
Episode 16 (December 15)	Pelageya	10	Alla Meunargia	"В городе моём"	30%	23.8%	53.8%	Eliminated
Episode 16 (December 15)	Pelageya	11	Anton Lavrentev	"Ne me quitte pas (Не покидай меня)"	50%	26%	76%	Advanced
Episode 16 (December 15)	Pelageya	12	Antonello Carozza	"Un amore cosi grande"	20%	50.2%	70.2%	Eliminated

=== Week 3: Semifinal (December 22) ===
The Top 8 performed on December 22, 2017. One artist from each team with the fewest votes left the competition by the end of the night.

Episode	Coach	Order	Artist	Song	Coach's vote (/100%)	Public's vote (/100%)	Votes' summa	Result
Episode 17 (December 22)	Pelageya	1	Anton Lavrentev	"Love Runs Out"	40%	25%	65%	Eliminated
Episode 17 (December 22)	Pelageya	2	Ladislav Bubnar	"Очи чёрные"	60%	75%	135%	Advanced
Episode 17 (December 22)	Dima Bilan	3	Yang Ge	"Моей душе покоя нет"	40%	68.7%	108.7%	Advanced
Episode 17 (December 22)	Dima Bilan	4	Danil Buranov	"She's Gone"	60%	31.3%	91.3%	Eliminated
Episode 17 (December 22)	Leonid Agutin	5	Brandon Stone	"Тбилисо"	40%	51.7%	91.7%	Eliminated
Episode 17 (December 22)	Leonid Agutin	6	Timofey Kopylov	"Звон"	60%	48.3%	108.3%	Advanced
Episode 17 (December 22)	Alexander Gradsky	7	Lora Gorbunova	"Беда"	60%	25.8%	85.8%	Eliminated
Episode 17 (December 22)	Alexander Gradsky	8	Selim Alakhyarov	"Лирическая"	40%	74.2%	114.2%	Advanced

Trios
Order	Performer	Song
17.1	Alexander Ivanov, Anton Lavrentev, and Ladislav Bubnar	"Моя неласковая Русь"
17.2	Alekseev, Yang Ge, and Danil Buranov	"Пьяное солнце"
17.3	Pesniary, Brandon Stone, and Timofey Kopylov	"Вологда"
17.4	Sergey Bezrukov, Lora Gorbunova, and Selim Alakhyarov	"Натянутый канат"

=== Week 4: Final (December 29) ===
The Top 4 performed on December 29, 2017. This week, the four finalists performed two solo cover songs and a duet with their coach.

Coach	Artist	Order	Duet Song (with Coach)	Order	Solo Song (no.1)	Order	Solo Song (no.2)	Result	
Alexander Gradsky	Selim Alakhyarov	1	"Журавли"	5	"Нам не жить друг без друга"	9	"Перемен"	Winner	67.3%
Pelageya	Ladislav Bubnar	2	"Desert Rose"	6	"Hallelujah"	10	"Lady Carneval"	Third Place	
Dima Bilan	Yang Ge	3	"Держи"	7	"Где же ты, мечта?"	Eliminated		Fourth Place	
Leonid Agutin	Timofey Kopylov	4	"Время последних романтиков"	8	"Highway to Hell"	11	"Застольная"	Runner-up	32.7%

Non-competition performances
Order	Performer	Song
18.1	Yang Ge, Ladislav Bubnar, Selim Alakhyarov, and Timofey Kopylov	"Let It Be"
18.2	Yang Ge	"The Show"
18.3	Selim Alakhyarov (winner)	"Чёртово колесо"
18.4	All of the artists of the 6th season	"Happy New Year"

== Reception ==
=== Rating ===
Episode		Original airdate	Production	Time slot (UTC+3)	Audience		Source
Episode		Original airdate	Production	Time slot (UTC+3)	Rating	Share	Source
1	"The Blind Auditions Premiere"	September 1, 2017	601	Friday 9:30 p.m.	6.5	24.6	
2	"The Blind Auditions, Part 2"	September 8, 2017	602	Friday 9:30 p.m.	6.2	22.2	
3	"The Blind Auditions, Part 3"	September 15, 2017	603	Friday 9:30 p.m.	5.8	20.7	
4	"The Blind Auditions, Part 4"	September 22, 2017	604	Friday 9:30 p.m.	5.8	19.9	
5	"The Blind Auditions, Part 5"	September 29, 2017	605	Friday 9:30 p.m.	6.3	22.2	
6	"The Blind Auditions, Part 6"	October 6, 2017	606	Friday 9:30 p.m.	6.2	20.5	
7	"The Blinds End"	October 13, 2017	607	Friday 9:30 p.m.	6.6	21.7	
8	"The Battles Premiere"	October 20, 2017	608	Friday 9:30 p.m.	6.4	20.2	
9	"The Battles, Part 2"	October 27, 2017	609	Friday 9:30 p.m.	6.0	18.9	
10	"The Battles, Part 3"	November 3, 2017	610	Friday 9:30 p.m.	5.9	18.8	
11	"The Battles, Part 4"	November 10, 2017	611	Friday 9:30 p.m.	5.7	18.1	
12	"The Knockouts Premiere"	November 17, 2017	612	Friday 9:30 p.m.	5.4	17.4	
13	"The Knockouts, Part 2"	November 24, 2017	613	Friday 9:30 p.m.	5.5	17.7	
14	"The Knockouts, Part 3"	December 1, 2017	614	Friday 9:30 p.m.	5.8	18.3	
15	"Live Quarterfinals, Part 1"	December 8, 2017	615	Friday 9:30 p.m.	5.3	17.1	
16	"Live Quarterfinals, Part 2"	December 15, 2017	616	Friday 9:30 p.m.	5.3	17.0	
17	"Live Semifinal"	December 22, 2017	617	Friday 9:30 p.m.	5.2	16.7	
18	"Live Season Final"	December 29, 2017	618	Friday 9:30 p.m.	5.5	17.9	
