= Bram Stoker's Burial of the Rats =

- 1995 theatrical poster
- Directed by: Dan Golden
- Written by: Bram Stoker; S. P. Somtow
- Based on: "The Burial of the Rats" by Bram Stoker
- Produced by: Roger Corman
- Starring: Adrienne Barbeau
- Cinematography: Vladimir Klimov
- Edited by: John Gilbert, Lorne Morris
- Music by: Eduard Artemyev
- Production companies: New Horizons; Mosfilm
- Distributed by: Concorde Pictures
- Release date: 8 August 1995
- Running time: 78 minutes
- Country: United States
- Language: English
- Budget: $2 million
- Box office: Direct-to-cable

Bram Stoker's Burial of the Rats is a 1995 American TV film made for Showtime. It was part of a series Roger Corman Presents. The film was shot in Russia.

The film is loosely based on Bram Stoker's 1896 short story "The Burial of the Rats" which is about an English traveler in Paris who is attacked and chased by a group of rag-pickers in the outskirts of the city. The "rat burial" refers to the feral swarms of rats that eat the flesh of corpses down to the bone.

A comic book version of the story was released by Cosmic Comics. The comic book story was by Jerry Prosser, Francisco Solano Lopez and Val Mayerik.

== Plot ==
The movie opens with Bram Stoker, played by Kevin Alber, riding in a coach with his father through dangerous woods inhabited by bandits..

The Bram Stoker character explains to his father that he wants to be a writer and write horror stories, such as on vampires. He quotes lines from Lord Byron's 1813 work The Giaour, a seminal work in the English language on vampires. Byron is regarded as the creator of the modern vampire character, the aristocratic, or Byronic vampire. He quotes these lines from Byron's The Giaour:

"But first, on earth as vampire sent,
Thy corse shall from its tomb be rent:
Then ghastly haunt thy native place,
And suck the blood of all thy race."

His gather attempts to dissuade him from becoming a writer, encouraging him to go into architecture instead. He must learn to pay attention. His father tells him: "To write, you must observe."

He is then attacked and kidnapped with his father by mysterious women as they visit Paris. He kills an attacker in order to save his father. He is seized by a cult of "Rat Women" under the command of a Queen who is played by Adrienne Barbeau. The Queen tells them: "Let us affirm this truth - we are all vermin in the ratholes of the universe." He is taken to their hideout which is infested with armies of rats controlled by the Queen.

He is sentenced for his crime to the "burial of the rats", to be eaten alive by packs of ravenous rats. This is his punishment for killing one of the members of the cult. He receives a reprieve from the death sentence when one of the members who is to kill him does not go through with it because of what he said, that he did what he did to save his father. This revived a painful memory for her concerning her own mother.

The Queen takes to him and allows him to join the all-woman cult if he can successfully go through an initiation ceremony. He has to cut the arm of a member and drink her blood. She was do the same with him. Finally, he must behead a man, his father, to complete the initiation and become a member of the cult. He does not do this. But then he has to flee from the cult members, forcing him on a flight for survival and escape. The French police are also involved.

The Queen is cornered by the police but she prefers death rather than capture by the men. She is devoured by her rats who only leave a white skeleton and her wig. This is the "burial of the rats". Stoker and his father escape along with the girl, Madeleine, played by Maria Ford, who was fatally shot.

In the final scene, all three emerge into the open air from the underground lair. The mortally wounded Madeleine dies in Stoker's arms. He kisses her on the forehead. His father tells him: "Write about her, my son, then she will live forever."

== Cast ==
- Adrienne Barbeau as The Queen
- Maria Ford as Madeleine
- Kevin Alber as Bram Stoker
- Olga Kabo as Anna
- Eduard Plaxin as Mr. Stoker
- Vladimir Kuleshov as Constable
- Leonid Timtsunik as Verlaine
- Maya Menglet as Mme. Renaud

== Production ==
Filming took place in Moscow. Adrienne Barbeau later said "we landed on the night of the attempted coup and they declared martial law...and I wasn't sure I was ever going to see my family again. I really took the job because they were filming in Moscow and I wanted to go there. I had never been and I'd always wanted to go."

She later recalled, "I was also supposed to be working with 50 trained rats, but there were only 16 and I think eight of them were dead. The rest had only been trained to eat anything that smelled like fish. So every time I'd do a scene where the rats had had to swarm all over me, they took fish eggs and squeezed the juice all over my body."
