= The Adventures of Quentin Durward, Marksman of the Royal Guard =

- Russian: Приключения Квентина Дорварда, стрелка королевской гвардии
- Directed by: Sergey Tarasov
- Written by: Walter Scott; Sergey Tarasov
- Starring: Olga Kabo; Aleksandr Koznov; Aleksandr Lazarev; Aleksandr Yakovlev; Aleksandr Pashutin
- Cinematography: Anatoliy Ivanov
- Edited by: Marina Dobryanskaya
- Music by: Igor Kantyukov
- Release date: 1988
- Running time: 97 minute
- Country: Soviet Union
- Language: Russian

The Adventures of Quentin Durward, Marksman of the Royal Guard (Russian: Приключения Квентина Дорварда, стрелка королевской гвардии) is a 1988 Soviet historical adventure film directed by Sergey Tarasov.

== Plot ==
The film takes place in France in the 15th century. The film tells about the Scot, who is accepted into the guard. He must fulfill a difficult mission, which in fact is even more difficult than it seems.

== Cast ==
- Olga Kabo
- Aleksandr Koznov
- Aleksandr Lazarev
- Aleksandr Yakovlev
- Aleksandr Pashutin
- Yury Kuznetsov
- Leonid Kulagin
- Boris Khmelnitskiy
- Pauls Butkevics
- Boris Khimichev
