= Nina Shatskaya =

Russian singer and actress (born 1966)

Nina Arkadyevna Shatskaya Нина Аркадьевна Шацкая
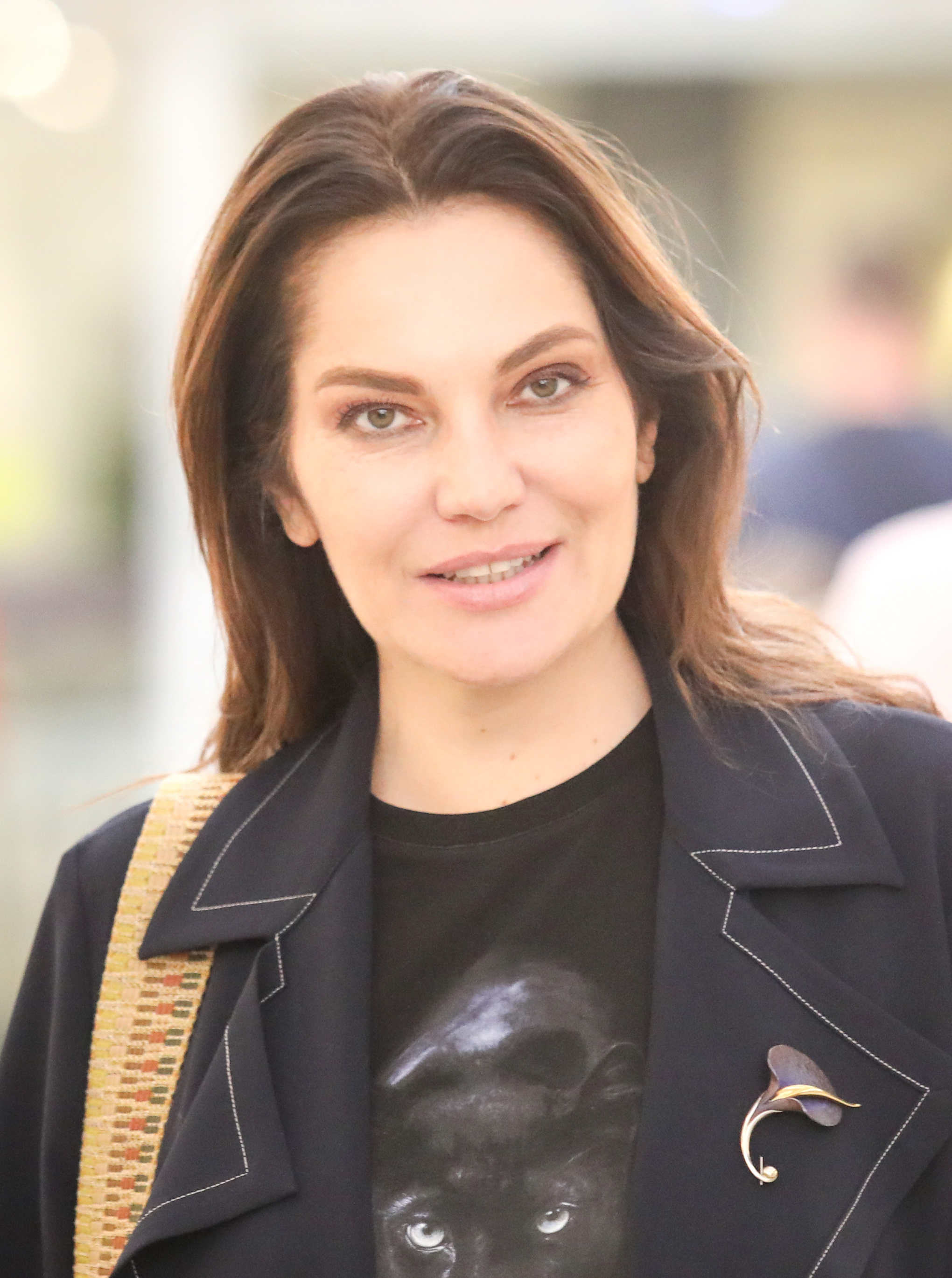

Background information
- Born: Ninel Arkadyevna Shatskaya; 22 April 1966 (age 60)
- Origin: Rybinsk, Russian SFSR, Soviet Union (present-day Russia)
- Genres: Jazz, Russian romance
- Occupations: Singer, actress
- Years active: 1999–present
- Website: www.ninasong.ru

Nina Arkadyevna Shatskaya (Note: Russian: Нина Аркадьевна Шацкая, romanized: Nina Arkadyevna Shatskaya) (born Ninel Shatskaya, (Note: Russian: Нинэль Аркадьевна Шацкая, romanized: Ninel Arkadyevna Shatskaya) April 22, 1966) is a Russian singer and actress, best known for her jazzy take on the Russian romance heritage. Staying out of the spotlight, Shatskaya is held in high regard by critics and colleagues. According to composer Nikita Bogoslovsky, "Next to our pop 'legends' she is a true queen: lonely and untouchable." Shatskaya released seven well-received albums and was designated a Meritorious Artist of Russia in 2004.

== Biography ==
Nina Arkadyevna Shatskaya was born in Rybinsk, USSR to the jazz musician, singer and conductor Arkady Shatsky. It was in his band Raduga (Радуга, Rainbow) that she has made her singing debut. A strict disciplinarian (who for many years was unwilling to support her ambition to become a professional singer), he proved in retrospect to be a perfect mentor and a major inspiration. "I was kind of a homely girl; I liked to knit and sew. Besides, I was overweight. All this irritated him immensely: he was sure this way I'd turn out fat, lazy and stupid. He criticized me mercilessly but somehow managed to help me shape up with this criticism. I was eager to prove I was worthy of his praise," she later remembered.

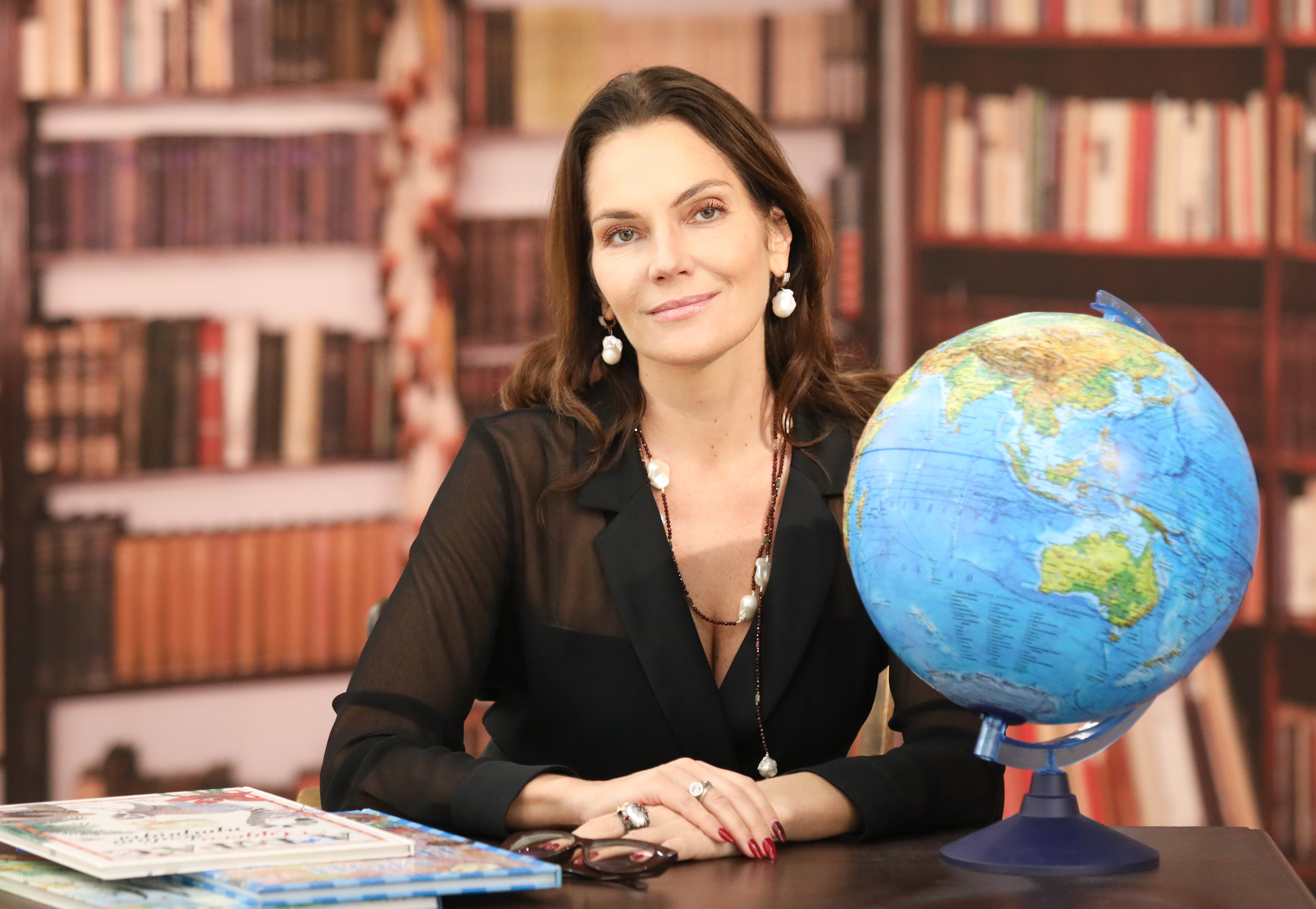
Nina Shatskaya at the Russian State Children’s Library in Moscow

After graduating school Nina couldn't decide which college to go to, so Arkady Shatsky sent her to a settlement near an agricultural factory to work there for a year as a club administrator. "That was where I learned what the word 'rural cultural life' meant. I tried hard to get some Indian films for our workers, painted billboards and organized parties," she later remembered. A year later Nina moved to Leningrad and enrolled in the Management faculty at the Humanitarian University. Later she attended the Music Hall Studio School, graduating from both. In Leningrad she felt uncomfortable and lonely. "While my girl friends were busy courting men, I spent all my evenings in the Conservatory or the Philharmonics," she said in an interview. Yet Shatskaya recalled fondly her years at the Leningrad Music Hall. "The teachers there were fantastic, and the performers were all individuals, each cultivating their own manner," she reminisced. She moved to the Moscow Music Hall and studied vocals at Gnesyn Academy, in the class of Natalya Andrianova, while also making miscellaneous recordings with orchestras for Soviet TV and radio.

In 1986 the family suffered a heavy blow. At the height of the Mikhail Gorbachev-induced 'economic crimes fighting' campaign Arkady Shatsky was arrested and sentenced to five years of hard labour for alleged financial wrongdoings. Shatsky never denied the fact that he had to use all of his entrepreneurial abilities to provide the band with the best equipment and modern instruments (like synthesizers), in the times when such items had to be 'procured' at black markets rather than legally bought.

He simply disappeared. My mother and I couldn't find out where they'd taken him. Mother was continuously insulted [at work], and then got fired. Many 'prominent' Rybinsk men who'd always been proud to have us as friends were now avoiding us... Our flat was searched and turned upside down: they hoped to find a large sum of hidden money, apparently, but only found the huge vinyl record collection which was my father's one and only item of luxury.

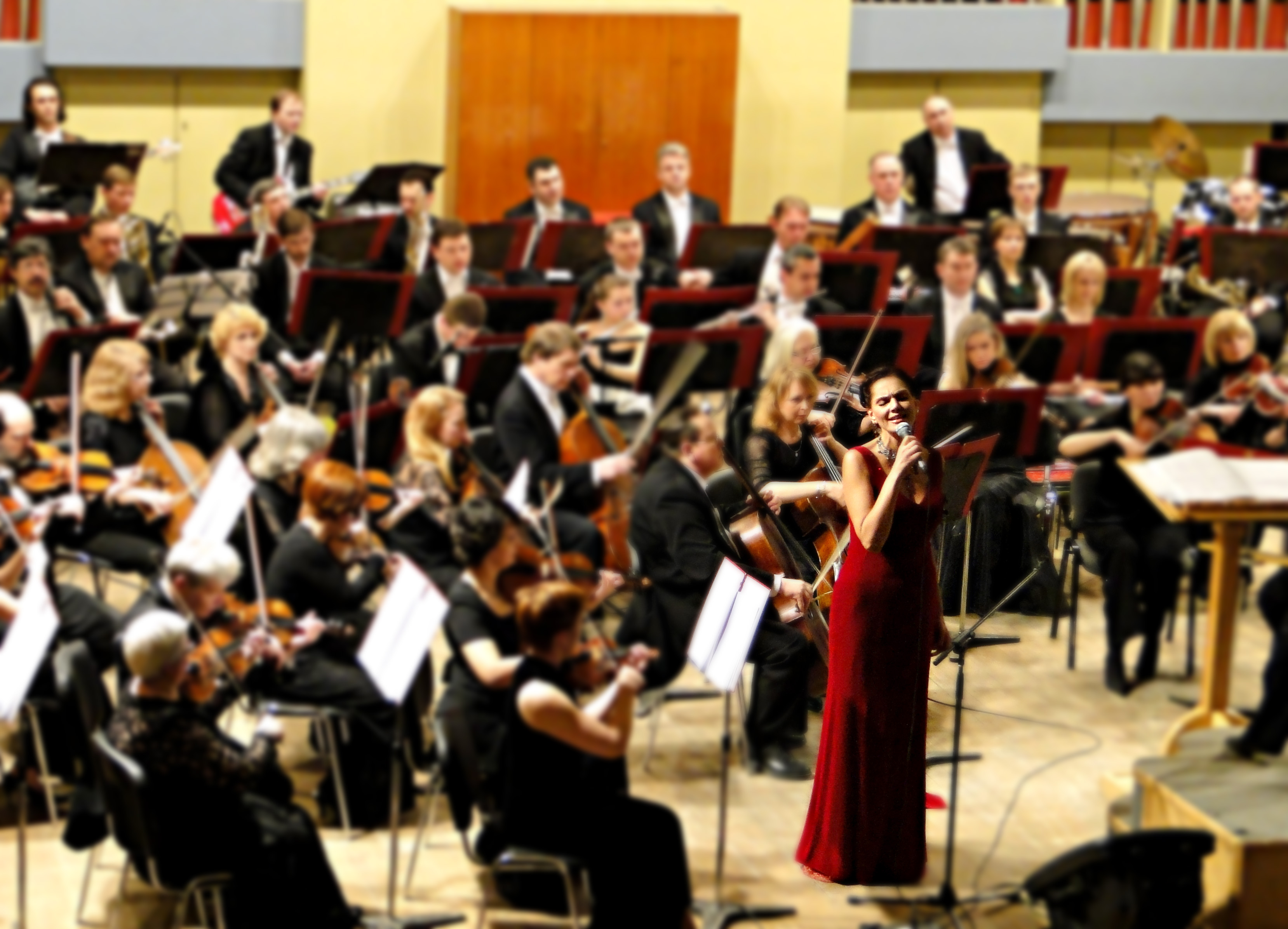
Shatskaya at the Yaroslavl Philarmony.

Arkady Shatsky returned home six months later after being amnestied, but the once internationally famous Raduga orchestra was now finished. "I realized that from then on I had to make my own decisions. The firm parental wall that had propped me up all of a sudden was in ruins," Nina remembered.

In 1999 Nina Shatskaya went to the US with a view of recording her Russian romances. "Investors hoped that there would be some kind of a romance revival. They wanted to make a high-budget product involving the leading Russian poets and composers. But producer Maksim Dunayevsky decided to make it a pop record and since I've never been keen on pop music, the project flopped," she later explained. The recorded material was taken back to Russia but remained unreleased. "I was well aware that the material we recorded was primitive and had nothing whatsoever to do with what I'd been dreaming of. I felt like I'd been given one chance and squandered it," she later admitted. She spent in America six months and spoke warmly of her vocal coach Seth Riggs. "When I first came to him, he was jovially dismissive of the Russian vocal school. Having heard me he was impressed and said I had brilliant technique, for which I have to thank Natalya Andrianova," the singer recalled.

Shatskaya's repertoire changed after she met Zlata Razdolina, a Saint Petersburg composer experimenting with the modern Russian romance genre. The immediate result of this collaboration was the musical version of Anna Akhmatova's Requiem, sung by Shatskaya and backed by the State Cinema Orchestra. Razdolina and Shatskaya soon parted ways, but years later they met again for another Akhmathova-themed project.

Shatskaya's debut album The Game of Love (2000, part of The Golden Mine of Romance series) later provided the title for an expansive concert project with the Russian Orchestra, directed by Boris Voron. It was followed by The Lady of Romance (2002) which brought Shatskaya to the Tchaikovsky Concert Hall for the first time. Arkady Shatsky, who attended the rehearsal, remarked: "At last my dream has come true. Now you are the woman I've always dreamt you'd become." Just several days after arriving to Rybinsk so as to promote Nina's concerts there, he died, aged 66. On November 4, 2002, still mourning her father's death, Shatskaya triumphantly performed at the Tchaikovsky Concert Hall, singing songs from the Music of Love set (Russian romances in part one, American song classics and movie standards in part two).

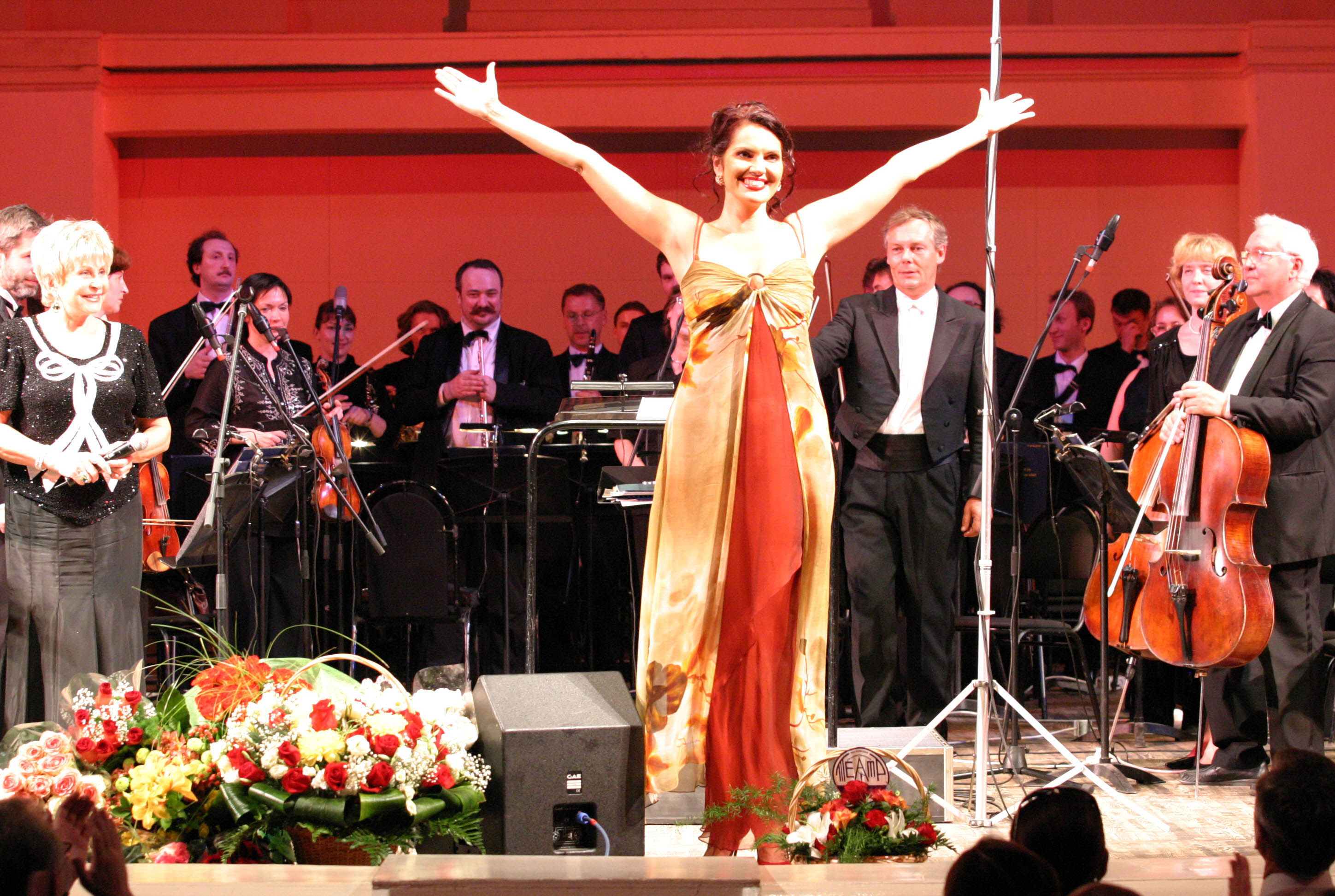
Shatskata at the Tchaikovsky Concert Hall

In the mid-2000s she started to perform at elitist events like The second Moscow Ball in Vienna, Russian Seasons in Kitzbühel, series of concerts at the Russian embassy in Finland, Russian film festivals (Zerkalo, European Window and Amur Autumn, among others). By this time she was collaborating with some well-established ensembles, including the State Symphony Cinema Orchestra (conducted by Sergei Skripka), the Moscow Symphony Orchestra (Vladimir Ziva), the Russian Presidential Orchestra, and the Karlovy Vary Orchestra. In 2004 Shatskaya premiered her From Romance to Jazz concert program at the Svetlanov Hall of the Moscow House of Music. The same year she was designated a Meritorious Artist of Russia.

In 2005 Shatskaya's third album Emerald (Изумруд), recorded in concert on March 13, 2005, at the Helikon Opera, came out as part of the Autumn Triptych concert series. The album's material, arranged starkly for piano and voice, was premiered at the Moscow International House of Music, accompanied by Natalya Bayurova.

It was followed by Song of Happiness (2005), part two of the same project, recorded with the Anatoly Silin Orchestra, and later that year, Mainstream Jazz, a collection of musicals, jazz and pop standards (including a cover of George Harrison's "Something") recorded at the Moscow International House of Music. In October 2007 Shatskaya performed at her father's fifth year memorial concert held in Rybinsk.

In early 2009 Shatskaya released her sixth album Zephir, describing it as "romanso-jazz", or "romances in jazz arrangements but in keeping with this genre's rules, without any improvisations." When asked about the album's title, she explained: "In those times when most of Russian romances were written, 'zephir' was the word for a warm, light night breeze. The album's warm, melancholy arrangements prompted this association."

Later in 2009 the album Sorceress was released, a collection of Zlata Razdolina's romances based on Anna Akhmatova's poetry and arranged for Sergei Skripka's orchestra by Dmitry Userdov. Her infatuation with these poems went back to Shatskaya's early student days when she'd gotten "all soaked in Akhmatova's poetry," she explained. That same year she was awarded the Order of the Sergei Diaghilev Foundation "for contribution to and development of Russian culture", specifically for the Akhmatova song cycle.

In October 2010 the poetry-and-music theatre production Remembering the Sun (Память о солнце, originally titled Sorceress) was premiered at the Moscow House of Music. Directed by Yulia Zhenova and based on Anna Akmatova's poetry (with music written by Zlata Razdolina) it featured Nina Shatskaya and actress Olga Kabo, "two of nature's elements, two unique women... recreating images of the long lost past, when love was sacrificial and for a woman a dream of happiness was something impossible and doomed," according to the press release.

On May 24, 2011, the extended version of Shatskaya's From Romance to Jazz concert program was presented at the International Moscow House of Music, coinciding with the re-issue of Zephir by Melodia and featuring Olga Kabo, composer Aleksander Pokidchenko and pianist Yuri Rozum as guest performers.

=== Career in films ===
Nina Shatskaya appeared in two films, Vadim Derbenyov's On the Corner by Patryarshy's (2001, starring Nikolai Karachentsov) and in Gleb Panfilov's In the First Circle (2006) based on Alexander Solzhenitsyn's novel The First Circle.

After meeting her back stage at a private party, Panfilov wondered if she was familiar with an obscure romance called Evening Ends (Уходит вечер). Pleasantly surprised with the affirmative, he decided to include this number in the film and later wrote a small role exclusively for the singer.

== Style and influences ==
External videos
- Don't Leave Me Now (Не уходи). Nikolay Zubov's classic performed by Nina Shatskaya in Moscow International House of Music.

Shatskaya considers her father Arkady Shatsky, the leader of the Rybinsk-based jazz-orchestra Raduga as her first and most profound influence. She cited Nina Simone, Billie Holiday, Lara Fabian, Diana Krall and Norah Jones as her favourite artists, as well as Elena Obraztsova, whom in her formative years she regarded 'a goddess'.

Nina Shatskaya's way of merging Russian romance with jazz caused controversy. Even her fan base was divided: some argued that she was a natural-born jazz diva, others insisted that she should concentrate on Russian classics and forget about American jazz. "When I first started doing [this jazz-romance crossover thing] there wasn't a single person who wouldn't tell me not to do this... Nowadays this new, jazzy way of singing a romance is generally regarded as something quite normal. Nobody's even aware now of how just a few years ago such a thing was deemed nonsense," Nina Shatskaya told a TV Kultura interviewer.

In the later times critics treated her experiments with respect. Teatral magazine described the singer as "a lonely traveller on a thorny path… Devoted to the Romance, she is not widely popular, but she's formed her own, intelligent and intellectual audience," the critic wrote. Shatskaya was also lauded for her "wide-range voice, exquisite sensitivity and good taste in choosing the material."

Shatskaya said she never cared for being pigeon-holed. "People do not come to my concerts for genre-picking. It is not to me that they listen, but to their own selves," she remarked. "My aim is not to shake my listener up, but just to tell a story and then hope that this story helps a person to evoke something intimate and important in their own memory", she said in another interview. According to the singer, one is not supposed to sing romance seriously, though: irony here is essential. "Not sarcasm, but irony. Like – 'those were the cruel times, when I lost my heart, but those were good times, too'. The audience should not suffer in the theater. Neither drama nor tragedy, but pleasantly sweet melancholy is what they should carry away with them," she argued.

Shatskaya said she welcomed the kind of criticism that can be used constructively. During her recording of the "Emerald" track in the Lenkom Theatre Studios, the actor Aleksandr Abdulov passingly remarked: "You sing of an Emerald as if it were a cobble-stone." This comment made a deep impression on the singer: she changed her approach completely and later cited this incident as a "crucial, if casual lesson."

In the late 2000s Nina Shatskaya became interested in Russian folklore and described this new development as 'most exciting'.

== Private life ==
Italian photographer Franko Vitale, best known for his collaborations with Fellini, came to Russia in the late 1980s and fell in love with Nina Shatskaya, then a Mosconcert singer. He proposed to her but she refused. Vitale made more than a thousand portraits of Shatskaya which later appeared in Italian magazines. This caused the widespread rumour that she worked as a model in Italy, which she's adamant that she never did. In the 1990s she was romantically involved with the composer Maksim Dunayevsky.

In one of her 2000s interviews Shatskaya described her family as "my mother and my brother [Dmitry] with his family." She's never been married. "This 'lack of love' does upset me, yes, but one has to agree that feisty, energetic and emotional men are very few, while others bore me," she remarked in one interview, adding: "In relationships I prefer to keep my distance. Otherwise, I am quite open and a very sociable person."

Nina Shatskaya's list of hobbies include exotic traveling, diving and photography; her works were lauded by the Russian Geographical Society.

== Discography ==
- Game of Love (Игра любви, 2000),
- Golden Mine of Romance, 2001
- Lady of Romance (Леди-романс, 2002)
- Emerald (Изумруд, 2005, live; Autumn Triptych, part 1)
- Mainstream Jazz (2005, live; Autumn Triptych part 2)
- Song of Happiness (Песня о счастье, 2005, live with the Anatoly Silin Orchestra; Autumn Triptych part 3)
- Zephir (Зефир, 2009)
- Sorceress (Колдунья, 2009)
