= The Burial of the Rats =

- Short story by Bram Stoker
- "The Burial of the Rats" was first published in Lloyd's Weekly Newspaper on 26 January 1896, as Chapter I, page 7.

Text available at Wikisource
- Country: United Kingdom, U.S.
- Language: English
- Genre: Horror

Publication
- Published in: Lloyd's Weekly Newspaper, Boston Herald
- Media type: Print
- Publication date: 26 January 1896, 2 February 1896

"The Burial of the Rats" is a horror short story by the Irish writer Bram Stoker, first published in two issues of the London-based Lloyd's Weekly Newspaper on 26 January 1896 and 2 February 1896. It was first published in the U.S. in the 26 January 1896 and 2 February 1896 issues of The Boston Herald. The story was divided into a Chapter I and a Chapter II.

The story is about an English traveler in Paris who wanders into a slum inhabited by violent "rat-people" and scavengers, chiffoniers, rag-pickers. It becomes a struggle of survival as the protagonist seeks to escape from the murderous throngs of outcasts and derelicts.

== Plot summary ==
Set in Paris of 1860, an English traveler finds himself alone in the rag-picker slums on the outskirts of the city in a "somewhat wild and not at all savoury" area. He walks on foot to Montrouge located in the southern suburbs of the city. He encounters an elderly woman at the encampment who arouses his suspicions when he notices that she is carrying a knife by her side. He also notices elderly veterans of Napoleon's army. He runs into tawdry scavengers and swarms of flesh-eating rats who chase him in a flight for survival.

After a long and grueling chase, he is able to evade his pursuers. The police are able to apprehend his attackers in the camp. The main suspect is found dead and their body eaten to the bones by the rats. The "rat burial" is a reference to the ravenous rats who eat the flesh of their victims. The story illustrates that the veneer of civilization is thin and that beneath the surface of the modern city lies a netherworld of decay and corruption which is rarely seen.

== Publication ==
"The Burial of the Rats" was first published in Lloyd's Weekly Newspaper on 26 January 1896 and 2 February 1896. It was first published in the U.S. in the 26 January 1896 and 2 February 1896 issues of The Boston Herald. In 1914, it was collected in Stoker's posthumous book Dracula's Guest and Other Weird Stories. It appeared in the September 1928 issue of the monthly short story magazine Weird Tales based in Chicago. In 1973 it appeared in The Bram Stoker Bedside Companion published by Victor Gollancz Ltd. in London. In 1997 it appeared in the anthology Best Ghost and Horror Stories by Dover Publications, Inc. in New York.

== Reception and analysis ==
Carol Senf wrote that "'The Burial of the Rats,' a story of purely human evil, tells of a young man's experience when he is trapped by a group of desperate people who wish to rob and murder him. One of Stoker's courageous young men, he manages to elude his predators and even to wreak some vengeance against them. Moreover, because the predators are associated with the violence of the French Revolution, this story—like Dracula—suggests a conflict between past and present."

Nida Tiranasawasdi, a researcher from Chulalongkorn University, Thailand, argued that "the rats represent a middle-class, Victorian-era fear of being corrupted or overpowered by the poor." The analysis focused on a shift in Gothic literature where rats are no longer perceived as demonic forces but rather represent a "threat of contagion" to both the public health and the social order, creating cultural and societal anxieties.

== Adaptations ==
"The Burial of the Rats" was adapted in 1995 as a U.S. TV movie for Showtime called Bram Stoker's Burial of the Rats by Roger Corman's film company. It was also adapted into a comic book by Jerry Prosser and Francisco Solano Lopez: Bram Stoker's Burial of the Rats, No. 1 (Roger Corman's Cosmic Comics, April 1995 issue).

An audio recording of the short story was released in 2012 on Audible narrated by James Langton.

== Sources ==
- Hughes, William. Beyond Dracula: Bram Stoker’s Fiction and Its Cultural Context. Springer, 2000.
- Senf, Carol A., ed. The Critical Introduction to Bram Stoker. Westport, Conn.: Greenwood Press, 1993.
- Shepherd, Mike. When Brave Men Shudder: The Scottish Origins of Dracula. Newcastle upon Tyne, UK: Wild Wolf Publishing, 2018.
- Stoker, Bram. Dracula's Guest and Other Weird Stories: With The Lair of the White Worm. Edited with an Introduction and Notes by Kate Hebblethwaite. London: Penguin Books, 2006.
- Stoker, Bram. The Bram Stoker Bedside Companion: Stories of fantasy and horror. Edited and with an Introduction by Charles Osborne. London: Victor Gollancz Ltd., 1973.
