= Michele Perniola =

Italian singer (born 1998)

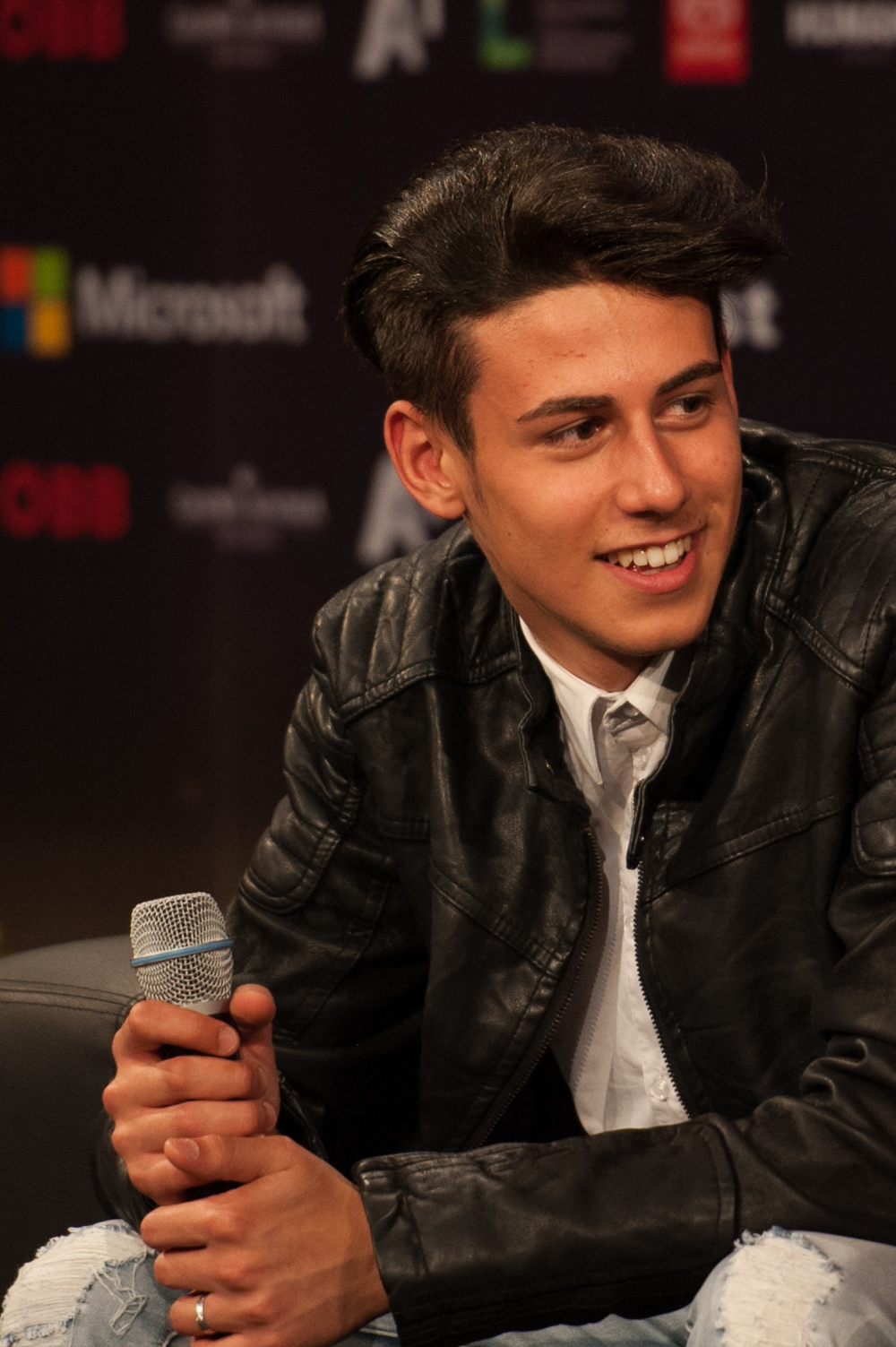
- Perniola in 2015

Background information
- Also known as: 3x3n
- Born: 6 September 1998 (age 27); Mottola, Italy
- Genres: Pop
- Occupation: Singer
- Instrument: Vocals
- Years active: 2012–present
- Website: www.queensacademy.it

Michele Perniola (born 6 September 1998), known also as 3x3n, is an Italian singer, best known for representing San Marino at the Junior Eurovision Song Contest 2013 with his song "O-o-O Sole Intorno a Me" (O-o-O Sunlight all around me). He also represented San Marino in the Eurovision Song Contest 2015 with Anita Simoncini. They performed the song "Chain of Lights".

== Life and work ==
Michele Perniola was born on 6 September 1998 in Palagiano, a small town in the province of Taranto, Italy.

== Career ==
=== 2012: Ti lascio una canzone ===
In December 2012, Perniola won the sixth edition of the popular Italian TV series Ti lascio una canzone, thus rising to fame. Ever since his victory, Perniola started having fans not only in Italy, but also in the United States and China.

=== 2013: Junior Eurovision Song Contest ===
Even though the rules of Junior Eurovision say that lead performers must be nationals or have lived in that country for at least two years, the EBU gave special permission to children aged 10–15 of either Sanmarinese or Italian nationality. Michele Perniola was internally selected to represent San Marino at the 11th Junior Eurovision Song Contest on 30 November 2013 with his song "O-o-O Sole Intorno a Me". The song placed 10th in a field of 12 songs, scoring 42 points.

=== 2014–present: Eurovision Song Contest ===
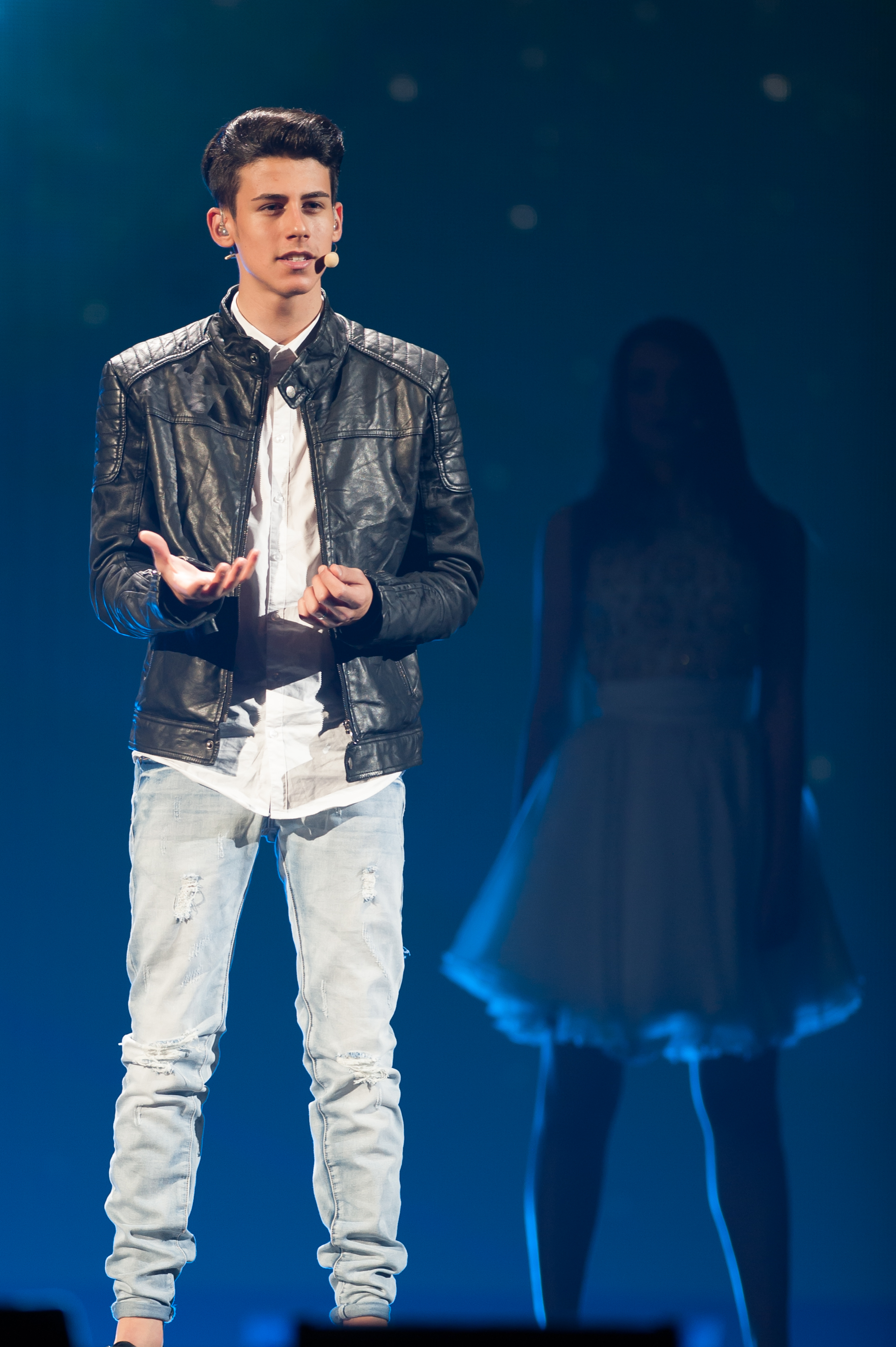
Michele Perniola & Anita Simoncini at the ESC 2015

On 18 April 2014, it was announced that Perniola would read the points for San Marino at the 59th Eurovision Song Contest. Despite the fact that he was born in September 1998, the EBU gave him special permission to be announcer of the votes for the microstate.

SMRTV revealed that Perniola and Anita Simoncini would represent San Marino at the Eurovision Song Contest 2015 during a press conference on 27 November 2014. Perniola previously represented San Marino in the Junior Eurovision Song Contest 2013 while Simoncini represented the nation in the 2014 Junior Contest as part of the group The Peppermints.

Perniola has said that he only learned he would be singing a duet with Simoncini while driving in the car to the press conference announcing it.

== Discography ==
=== Singles ===
Year	Title	Album
2013	"O-o-O Sole Intorno a Me" ("O-o-O Sunlight all Around Me")	Non-album singles
2015	"Chain of Lights" (with Anita Simoncini)	Non-album singles
2019	"Deja-Vu"	Non-album singles
2020	"Emerald Eyes"	Non-album singles
2021	"Amare invano"	Non-album singles

Awards and achievements
Preceded by none	San Marino in the Junior Eurovision Song Contest; 2013	Succeeded by The Peppermints with "Breaking My Heart"
Preceded by Valentina Monetta with "Maybe"	San Marino in the Eurovision Song Contest; 2015 (with Anita Simoncini)	Succeeded by Serhat with "I Didn't Know"
