= Olga Kabo =

Soviet and Russian actress

- Ольга Кабо
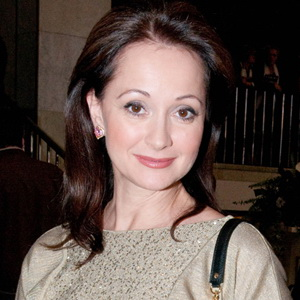
- Olga Kabo in 2010
- Born: Olga Igorevna Kabo; January 28, 1968 (age 58); Moscow, Russian SFSR, Soviet Union
- Citizenship: Soviet Union; Russia
- Occupation: Actress
- Years active: 1983-present
- Height: 1.8 m (5 ft 11 in)
- Spouse(s): Eduard Vasilishin, Nikolai Razgulyayev
- Children: Tatyana Vasilishina (1998), Viktor Razgulyayev (2009)
- Awards: Meritorious Artist of Russia (2002)

Signature
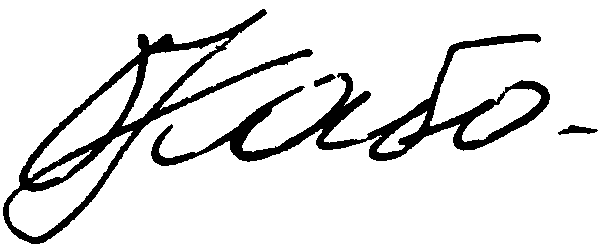

Olga Igorevna Kabo (Russian: О́льга И́горевна Кабо́, born January 28, 1968) is a Soviet and Russian theatre actress, stuntwoman, and singer.

== Biography ==
Olga Kabo was born in Moscow, the daughter of engineers Igor Yakovlevich and Ada Nikolayevna. From an early age she studied ballroom dance, rhythmic gymnastics, and attended art and musical courses, the latter at the Moscow Conservatory. Aged 15, she appeared in two films, the youth drama And Everything Returns (by Yaroslav Lupyi) and Vitaly Makarov's musical film No Joking. Having graduated from secondary school, Olga joined the Treatre studio at the Boris Shchukin Theatre Institute. She continued her education at the Gerasimov Institute of Cinematography where she joined the class of Sergey Bondarchuk.

Kabo's first success in film came with the part of Isabella in Sergey Tarasov's The Adventures of Quentin Durward (1988). She became famous in 1989 for her role in Lysistrata Comedy (featuring some nudity scenes) which brought her the reputation of a Russian movie sex symbol. In the 1990s she became internationally known for her roles in The Ice Runner (Lena, 1992) and Bram Stoker's Burial of the Rats (Anna, 1995). In 2002 Kabo joined the Mossovet Theatre troupe; that year she was honoured with the Meritorious Artist of Russia title.

She appeared in the first season of ice show contest Ice Age.

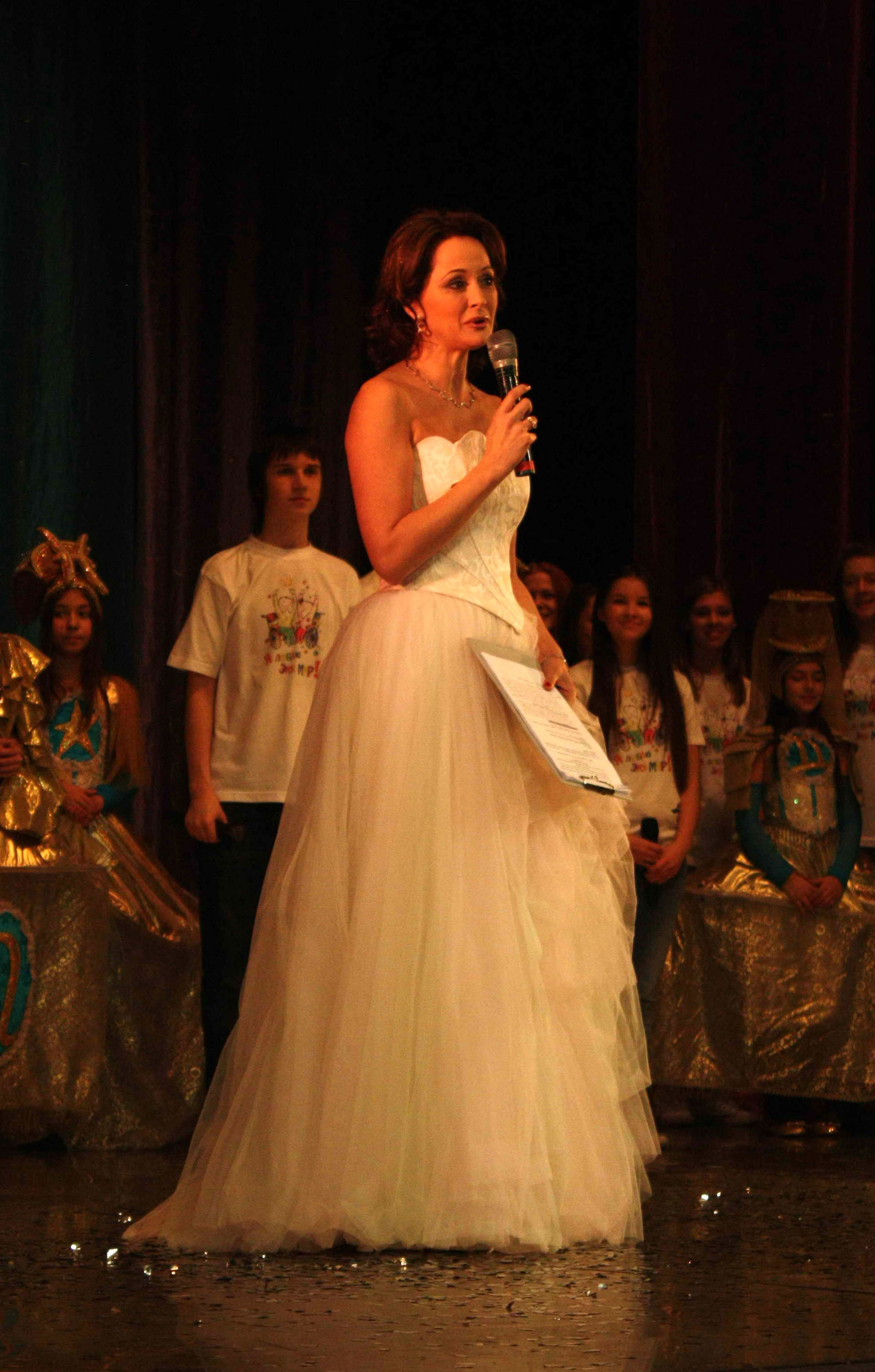
Kabo in 2009

== Private life ==
Kabo's first husband was the businessman Eduard Vasilishin. Their daughter Tatyana was born in 1998. After the divorce, she married the businessman Nikolai Razgulyayev in 2009. They have a son, Viktor, born in 2012.

== Selected filmography ==
Total over 68 movies.

- 1983 Anna Pavlova (Анна Павлова) as maid
- 1988 The Adventures of Quentin Durward, Marksman of the Royal Guard (Приключения Квентина Дорварда, стрелка королевской гвардии)
- 1988 Where is the Nophelet? (Где находится нофелет?) as visitor from the Urals
- 1989 Two arrows. Stone Age Detective as Turtle
- 1991 Crazies as Masha
- 1992 Musketeers Twenty Years After as de Longville
- 1993 The Ice Runner as Lena Popovskaya
- 1995 Burial of the Rats as Anna
- 2011 Battle of Warsaw 1920 as Sofiya Nikolayevna
- 2012 The Ballad of Uhlans as Martha
- 2019 Coma - Esprits prisonniers
