= Anita Simoncini =

Sammarinese singer (born 1999)

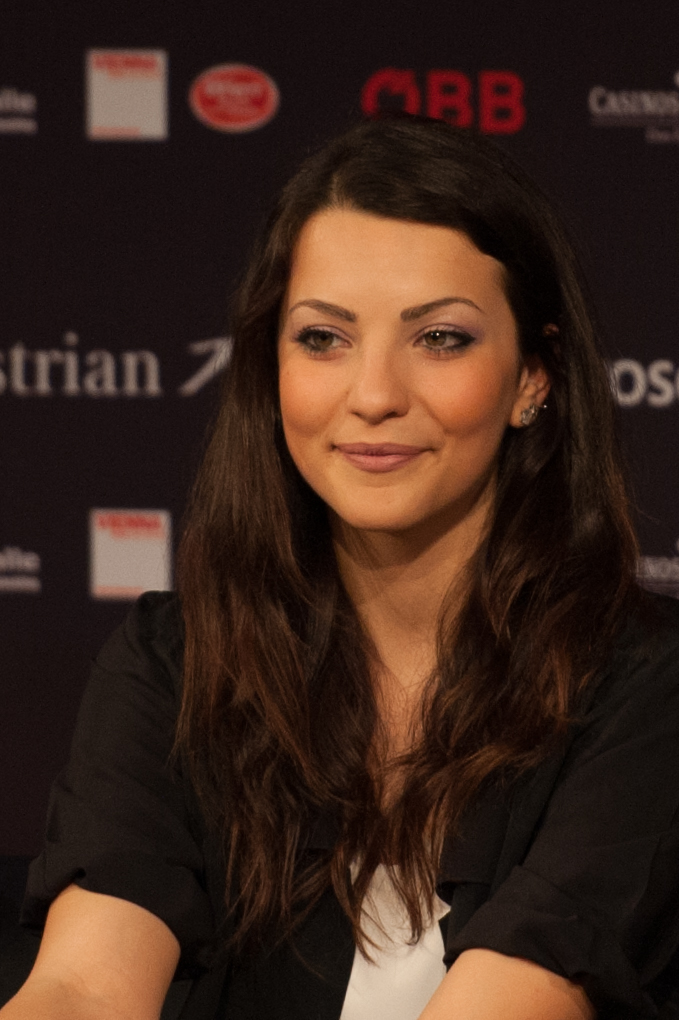
- Simoncini in 2015

Background information
- Born: 14 April 1999 (age 27); Montegiardino, San Marino
- Genre: Pop
- Occupation: Singer
- Instrument: Vocals
- Formerly of: The Peppermints

Anita Simoncini (born 14 April 1999) is a Sammarinese singer who represented San Marino in the Junior Eurovision Song Contest 2014 as a member of the girl group The Peppermints with the song "Breaking My Heart". She also represented San Marino in the Eurovision Song Contest 2015 along with Michele Perniola with the song "Chain of Lights".

== Life and career ==
=== Junior Eurovision Song Contest 2014 ===
On 26 September 2014, it was announced that The Peppermints would represent San Marino at the Junior Eurovision Song Contest 2014 in Malta with the song "Breaking My Heart". The song along with themselves was presented to the public at a press conference in San Marino on 13 October 2014. They performed third in the final, after Krisia, Hasan & Ibrahim from Bulgaria and before Josie from Croatia. They placed fifteenth achieving 21 points.

=== Eurovision Song Contest 2015 ===
On 27 November 2014, it was announced that Simoncini along with Michele Perniola (the brother of one of Simoncini's bandmates Raffaella Perniola) would represent San Marino at the Eurovision Song Contest 2015 in Vienna singing a duet. Their song, "Chain of Lights" was revealed on 13 March 2015.

== Discography ==
=== Singles ===
==== With The Peppermints ====
Year	Title	Album
2014	"Breaking My Heart"	Non-album single(s)

==== Solo ====
Year	Title	Album
2015	"Chain of Lights" (with Michele Perniola)	Non-album single(s)

== See also ==
- San Marino in the Junior Eurovision Song Contest 2014
- San Marino in the Eurovision Song Contest 2015

Awards and achievements
Preceded by Michele Perniola with "O-o-O Sole Intorno a Me"	San Marino in the Junior Eurovision Song Contest; 2014 (with The Peppermints)	Succeeded by Kamilla Ismailova with "Mirror"
Preceded by Valentina Monetta with "Maybe"	San Marino in the Eurovision Song Contest; 2015 (with Michele Perniola)	Succeeded by Serhat with "I Didn't Know"
