= Serhat (singer) =

Turkish singer (born 1964)

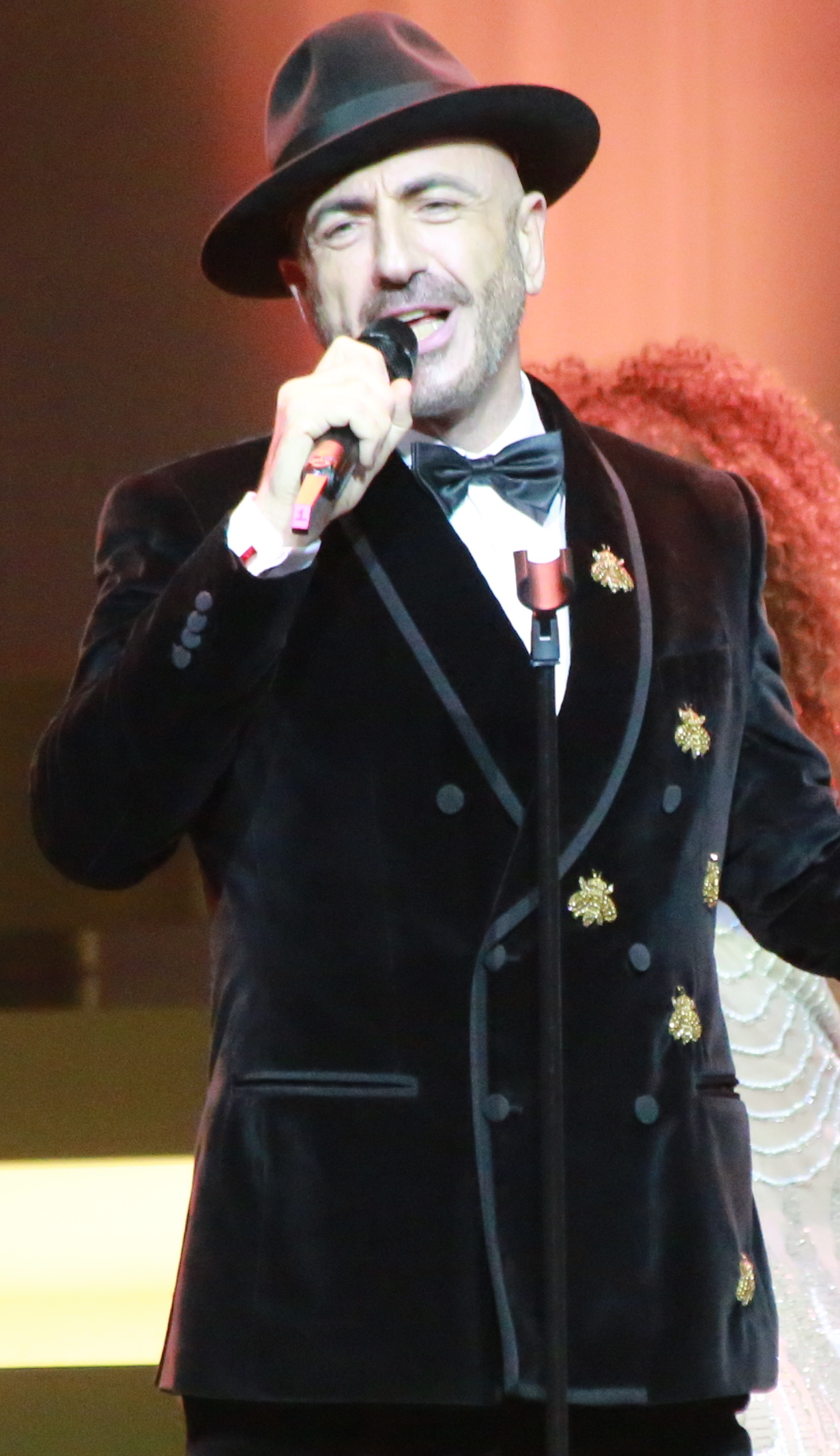
- Serhat performing in 2015
- Born: Ahmet Serhat Hacıpaşalıoğlu; 24 October 1964 (age 61); Istanbul, Turkey
- Occupations: Singer; songwriter; producer; television presenter
- Years active: 1994–present
- Musical career
- Genres: Pop; dance; disco; Latin; novelty
- Labels: End Music; Planetworks; CAP-Sounds
- Website: serhatofficial.com

Ahmet Serhat Hacıpaşalıoğlu (born 24 October 1964), known as Serhat, is a Turkish singer, songwriter, producer and television presenter.

Born and raised in Istanbul, Serhat started his production career by establishing his own company in 1994, End Productions. In the same year, he also started to produce and host a quiz show on TRT called Riziko! (Turkish version of the American quiz show Jeopardy!). In 1997, with his first single, "Rüya-Ben Bir Daha", his musical career began. Beside his other hosting and producing works, he continued his musical career and released "Total Disguise" (duet with Viktor Lazlo) in 2004, "Chocolate Flavour" in 2005, "I Was So Lonely", "No No Never (Moscow-Istanbul)" and "Ya + Ty" (Russian version of "Total Disguise", all three songs were duets with Tamara Gverdtsiteli) in 2008 and "Je m'adore" in 2014.

He represented San Marino in the Eurovision Song Contest 2016 in Stockholm singing "I Didn't Know" on 10 May 2016 in the first semi final of Eurovision, but failed to qualify for the final. In 2017, the disco version of the song featuring Martha Wash was released. This version reached number 25 on the Dance Club Songs chart, making Serhat the first Turkish singer to appear on the chart. In 2018, a new version of "Total Disguise" featuring Helena Paparizou was released. He represented San Marino for the second time in the Eurovision Song Contest 2019 in Tel Aviv with "Say Na Na Na". He performed in the first semi final and qualified for the final, placing 8th. In the final, he placed 19th, the best result in Sammarinese Eurovision Song Contest history. A German-language version of the song "Sing Na Na Na" was released in 2019, and the Spanish-language version "Di Na Na Na" in 2020.

== Early years and education ==
Serhat was born on 24 October 1964 in Istanbul. His father, İsmail Hakkı, was a naval officer who was born in Trabzon where his mother was born, too. He attended a primary school in İcadiye, Üsküdar, and then Deutsche Schule Istanbul (German High School) in Beyoğlu, Istanbul. He graduated from Faculty of Dentistry of Istanbul University in 1988. In 1990, he completed two months of compulsory military service in Burdur.

== Career ==
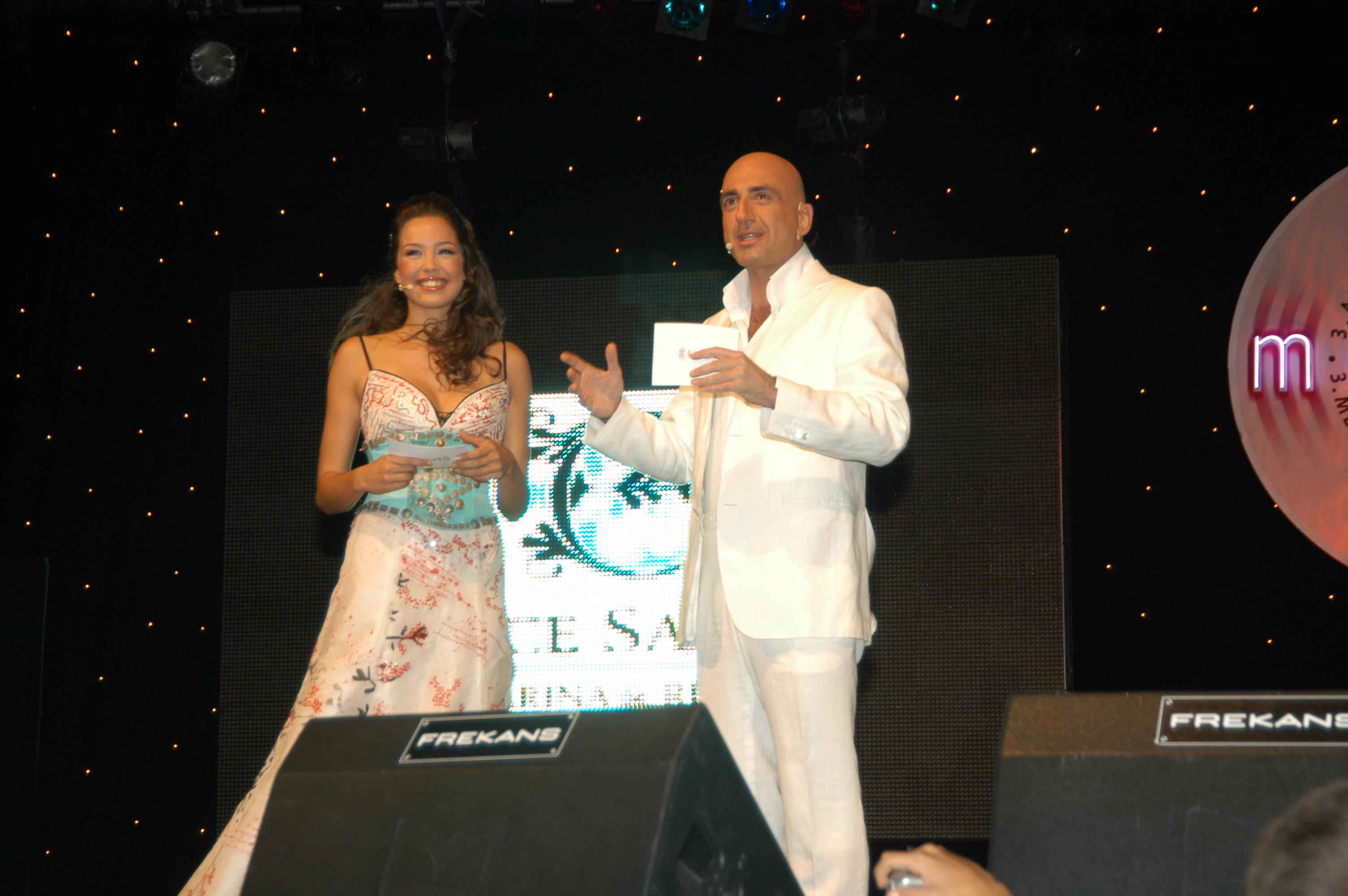
Azra Akın (left) and Serhat at the Megahit-International Mediterranean Song Contest 2004

=== Television and events ===
In 1994, Serhat established his own production company, End Productions. After an agreement with TRT, the company became the producer of the quiz show named Riziko!, Turkish version of the American quiz show Jeopardy!. Serhat was also the host of the show that started to air on 3 October 1994. In 1995, he received two Golden Butterfly (Turkish: Altın Kelebek) awards, one for "Best Male Host of the Year" and one for "Best Quiz Show of the Year" for Riziko!. In 1996 he again received the award for "Best Quiz Show of the Year". The show lasted over 430 episodes and ended at the end of 1996. A game show named Hedef 4 (Turkish version of Connect Four) that started to air on TRT 1 in 1996, was produced by End Productions. In 1997, he started to produce the game show Altına Hücum (Turkish version of Midas Touch) for Kanal 6 which ended after 72 episodes in the same year. In 1998, Riziko! returned to television and was aired on Kanal 7 hosted by Serhat. In the same year, Hedef 4 started to air on Kanal 7, too and ended the following year. Riziko! ended in 1999 and in the same year, Serhat started to host a talk entertainment on Kanal 7 named Serhat'la Rizikosuz which ended after six episodes. After a few months, Riziko! returned to Kanal 7 in 2000 and was continued 65 episodes. In September 2005, Serhat co-hosted Show TV's Kalimerhaba with Katerina Moutsatsou, a TV show which was produced by End Productions. At the end of 2009, Serhat created a dance orchestra "Caprice the Show" with 18 musicians and made numerous performances in the following years.

With his company, he also organizes some annual events such as the High School Music Contest (Liselerarası Müzik Yarışması, 1998–present), the Megahit-International Mediterranean Song Contest (Megahit-Uluslararası Akdeniz Şarkı Yarışması, 2002–2004) and the Dance Marathon (Dans Maratonu, dance competition between high schools and universities separately, 2009–present).

==== Production credits ====
Series	Channels	Years	Functioned as		Notes
Series	Channels	Years	Presenter	Producer	Notes
Riziko!	TRT 1 Kanal 7 Kanal 7	1994–96; 1998–99; 2000	Yes	Yes	
Hedef 4	TRT 1 Kanal 7	1996–98; 1998–99	No	Yes	
Altına Hücum	Kanal 6	1997	No	Yes	
Serhat'la Rizikosuz	Kanal 7	1999	Yes	Yes	
Kalimerhaba	Show TV	2005	Yes	Yes	Co-hosted with Katerina Moutsatsou

=== Musical career ===
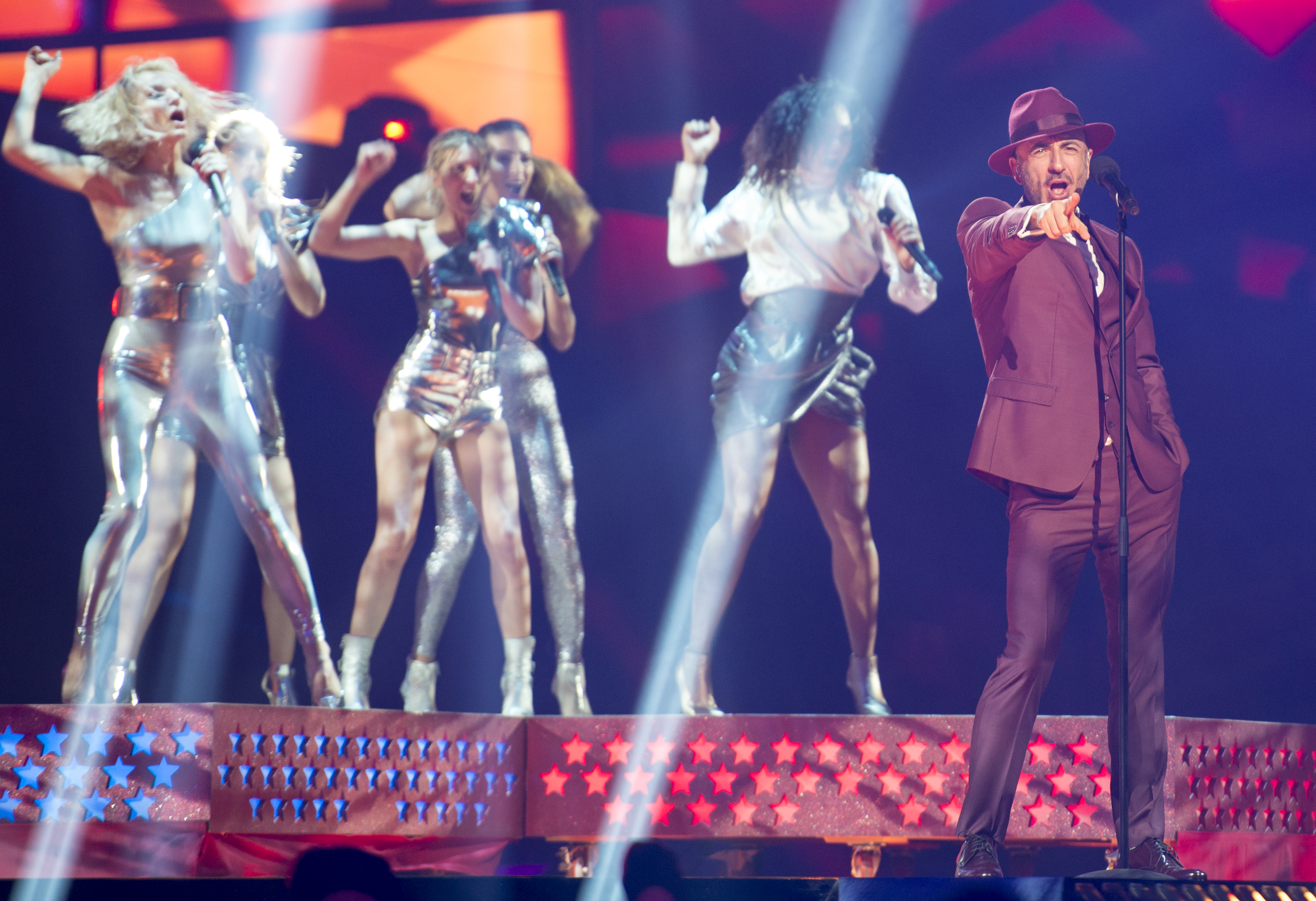
Serhat during a rehearsal before the first semi final of the Eurovision Song Contest 2016 (6 May 2016)

He started his musical career 1997, with a single of two songs "Rüya" and "Ben Bir Daha". In 2004, he released his second single named "Total Disguise" with the French singer Viktor Lazlo in duet. Lyrics and music of the song were written by Olcayto Ahmet Tuğsuz and the song was performed both in English and French. The single also contained several remix versions of the song. In 2005, he recorded "Chocolate Flavour" and the song was released with "Total Disguise" as a single in Greece. In 2008, he collaborated with Russian/Georgian singer Tamara Gverdtsiteli and they recorded "I Was So Lonely", "No No Never (Moscow-Istanbul)" and "Ya + Ti" (Russian version of "Total Disguise"). These songs were released as a single and also appeared in Gverdtsiteli's album Vozdushiy Potsyelui (2008).

In 2014, Serhat started to work in France and Germany. He released his fifth single, a French song called "Je m'adore" with the music video directed by Thierry Vergnes shot in Paris. It reached number 1 for 5 weeks in a row on Deutsche DJ Black/Pop Charts, number 1 on Black 30, number 2 on British Dance Charts, number 8 on French Dance Charts and number 9 on Swiss Dance Charts.

On 12 January 2016, San Marino RTV announced that Serhat would represent San Marino in the Eurovision Song Contest 2016 in Stockholm. On 9 March 2016, the song that he performed in the contest, "I Didn't Know" was released. He performed in the first semi-final on 10 May and failed to qualify to final, ending in 12th place. On 2 November 2017, the disco version of "I Didn't Know" featuring Martha Wash, re-arranged by Swedish musician Johan Bejerholm, was released as a single, along with a new music video. The song entered the American Dance Club Songs chart at number 47 and peaked at number 25 in its fourth week on the chart. This made Serhat the first ever Turkish singer to appear on the chart. A new version of "Total Disguise" featuring Elena Paparizou was released on 22 June 2018 by CAP-Sounds. The music video of the single was released on 14 September.

On 21 January 2019, San Marino RTV announced that he would again represent San Marino in the Eurovision Song Contest 2019 in Tel Aviv. On the same day, Serhat announced that he had been working on his first studio album, which was released in April 2019. The song that he performed in the contest, "Say Na Na Na", was released with an accompanying music video on 7 March. He performed in the first semi final on 14 May 2019 and qualified for the final, where he finished 19th, setting the record for the highest placing San Marinese song in Eurovision history. This was only the second time San Marino had qualified for a Eurovision final, and the first time since 2014. On 19 July 2019, a German cover version of "Say Na Na Na" titled "Sing Na Na Na" was released by Serhat. It was accompanied by a remade version of the music video of "Say Na Na Na" released the same day. The Spanish cover version of the song, "Di Na Na Na" was released on 16 October 2020. The lyrics were translated to Spanish by Adolfo Caiman and the animated music video was created by Josue Gil Aleman.

=== Other works ===
Since 2010, Serhat is the president of Alumni Association of Istanbul German High School (German: Verein der Ehemaligen Schüler der Deutschen Schule Istanbul, Turkish: İstanbul Alman Liseliler Derneği) and since 2013 a board member of Istanbul German High School Management Association (German: Verein zum Betrieb der Deutschen Schule Istanbul, Turkish: İstanbul Özel Alman Lisesi İdare Derneği).

== Discography ==
=== Albums ===
Title	Details
That's How I Feel	Released: 3 May 2019; Format: Digital download, CD; Label: CAP-Sounds

=== Singles ===
Title	Year	Peak chart positions		Album
Title	Year	US Dance	GRE	Album
"Rüya-Ben Bir Daha"	1997	—	—	Non-album single
"Total Disguise" (featuring Viktor Lazlo)	2004	—	11	That's How I Feel
"Chocolate Flavour"	2005	—	—	That's How I Feel
"I Was So Lonely-No No Never" (featuring Tamara Gverdtsiteli)	2008	—	—	Non-album single
"Je m'adore"	2014	—	—	That's How I Feel
"I Didn't Know"	2016	—	—	That's How I Feel
"I Didn't Know" (featuring Martha Wash)	2017	25	—	That's How I Feel
"Total Disguise" (featuring Helena Paparizou)	2018	—	1	That's How I Feel
"Say Na Na Na"	2019	—	—	That's How I Feel
"Sing Na Na Na"	2019	—	—	Non-album singles
"Di Na Na Na"	2020	—	—	Non-album singles
"Benim Halkım"	2022	—	—	Non-album singles
"M.Y.K.O.N.O.S"	2023	—	—	Non-album singles
"—" denotes a recording that did not chart or was not released in that territory.

== Awards and honours ==
Year	Awards	Category	Work	Result
1995	Golden Butterfly Awards	Best Male Host of the Year	Riziko!	Won
1995	Golden Butterfly Awards	Best Quiz Show of the Year	Riziko!	Won
1996	Golden Butterfly Awards	Best Quiz Show of the Year	Riziko!	Won
2020	Golden Butterfly Awards	Achievement Award	Himself	Won

- 1998: Fair Play Grand Prize by National Olympic Committee of Turkey
- 2003: FIDOF (International Federation of Festival Organizations) Annual Golden Transitional Media Ring of Friendship
- 2004: Golden Key of the City of Alexandria

Awards and achievements
Preceded by Michele Perniola & Anita Simoncini with "Chain of Lights"	San Marino in the Eurovision Song Contest; 2016	Succeeded by Valentina Monetta & Jimmie Wilson with "Spirit of the Night"
Preceded by Jessika feat. Jenifer Brening with "Who We Are"	San Marino in the Eurovision Song Contest; 2019	Succeeded by Senhit with "Freaky!"
