= Sara Koell =

Austrian singer-songwriter

Sara De Blue
- Born: Sara Koell; 22 May 1990 (age 35); Mittersill, Austria
- Genres: Electronic, EDM, jazz, blues, R&B
- Occupations: Singer, songwriter, actress
- Years active: 2003–present
- Website: www.saradeblue.com

Sara Koell (born 22 May 1990 in Mittersill), better known as Sara De Blue, is an Austrian singer and songwriter.

== Career ==
At the age of 13, De Blue started singing in bands. During that time her band performed at several talent shows, in which they gained 3rd place at a Battle of the Bands organized by Red Bull. In 2011, De Blue stepped into the spotlight after winning the YouTube voting for the Austrian talent show The Voice 2011. Between 2014 and 2016 she also gained the spot as opening act at the Kitzbühel Musikfestival. De Blue also was the closing act at the Donauinselfestes 2016, where she performed together with Camo & Krooked on the FM4 Stage. She also gained several performances at the ProSieben-Puls 4 GameChanger Festival. De Blue also had the honor of becoming the first Austrian to sing the "new" Austrian national anthem at the 2012 Winter Youth Olympics in Innsbruck. In 2014, De Blue applied for The Voice of Germany, in which she became the first singer from Tyrol to reach the Top 40, making it into the team of Max Herre, and becoming from the first Austrian to reach the show's Showdown round. In early 2016, De Blue got nominated by Austrian broadcaster ORF as a wildcard act into the country's Eurovision Song Contest selection. She performed and released the song "Closer to the Sun", but without making into the final. Two years later, De Blue tried out for the Eurovision Song Contest again, whereas this time she participated in the Sammarinese selection. She came very close, finishing in 2nd place, with her song "Out of the Twilight". In 2019, De Blue was invited to perform as guest artist in Austrian TV show Dancing Stars. She also performed at the Life Ball with Electro-Swing duo Cirque De La Nuit. In August 2019, she performed at Romanian song festival Cerbul de Aur in Brașov, winning first prize.

De Blue has also performed with a variety of artists, such as Nadine Beiler, Ludwig Coss, Eberhard Forcher, Max Herre, Philipp Van Het Velt, Lukas Hillebrand, The BossHoss, Mano Michael, Nikodem Milewski, Sekou Neblett, Robert Palfrader, Matthias Simoner, Anja Steinlechner, Zoë Straub, and Nathan Trent. She also has several appearances on Austrian TV and radio.

== Personal life ==
In 2011, Sara graduated from the Pedagogical College Tyrol in Innsbruck and gained her bachelor's degree in music education and English. In 2014, she completed a course in jazz singing in which she was mentored by Austrian singer Aja Zischg-Eberle. Sara also took courses in music improvisation, dance, and acting at the Regional Academy of Music in Innsbruck. In 2019, Sara completed and gained her bachelor's degree in jazz singing and EMP at the Anton Bruckner University in Linz.

== Discography ==
=== Sara Koell ===
EP

- 2010: See You Again

Singles

- 2010: "Walking On Water"
- 2012: "Can't Stop"
- 2012: "Shining Stars"
- 2015: "Imaginarium" (Feat. Sunrise16 & Nadine Beiler)
- 2015: "Moonlight Serenade" (Feat. Sunrise16)
- 2015: "I Choose Love" (Feat. Sunrise16)
- 2016: "Energy"

=== SKP ===
Albums

- 2014: N.I.M.B.Y.

Singles

- 2014: "Peace"

=== Sara De Blue ===
Singles

- 2016: "Closer to the Sun"
- 2018: "Out of the Twilight"
- 2020: "Weiße Weihnacht"
- 2021: "Tirol Tirol Tirol"
