= Jenifer Brening =

German singer and songwriter

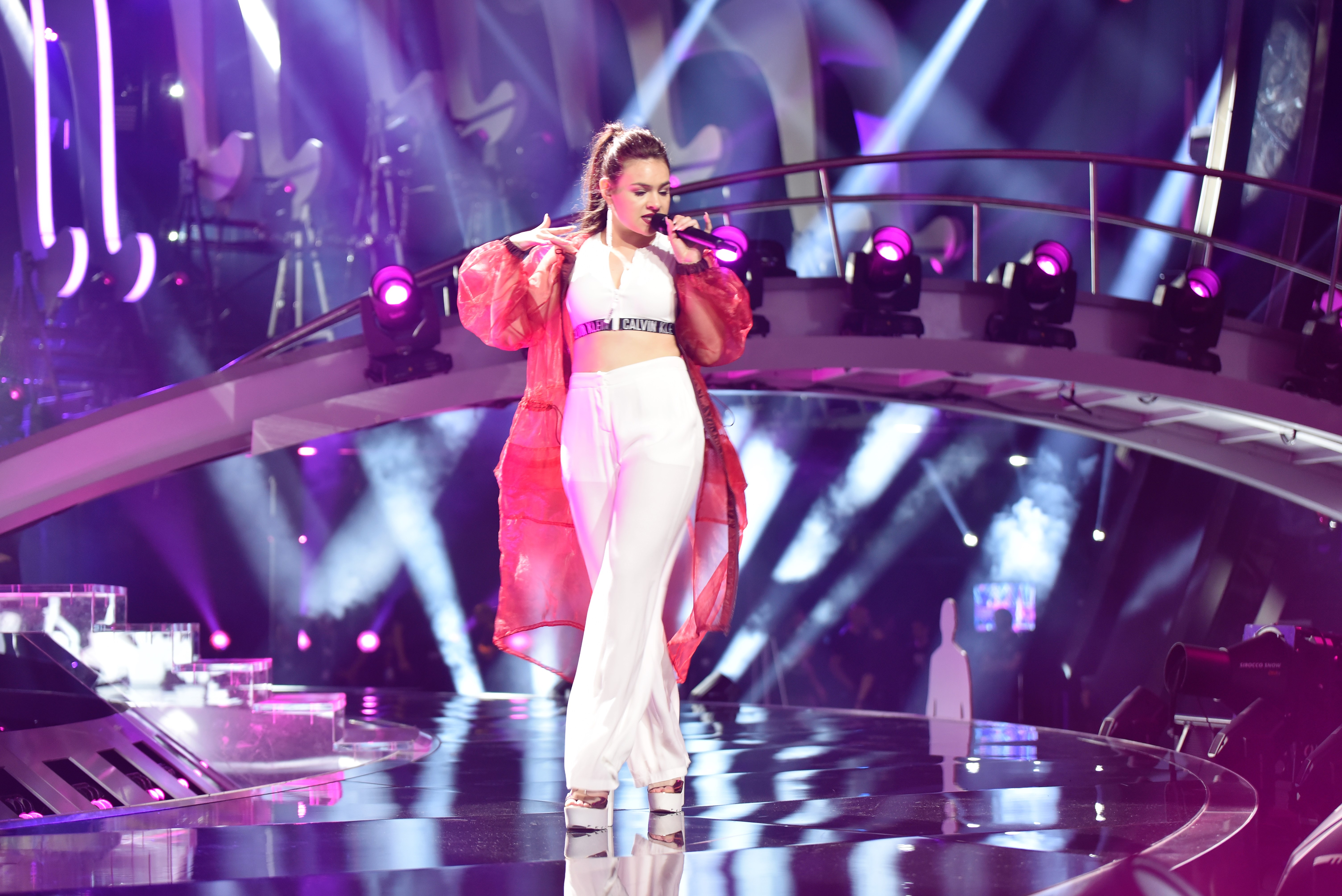
- Brening in May 2018

Background information
- Birth name: Jenifer Brening
- Born: 15 December 1996 (age 28); Berlin
- Origin: Germany
- Genres: pop
- Occupation(s): Singer, songwriter
- Instrument: Vocals
- Years active: 2013–present

Jenifer Brening (born 15 December 1996) is a German singer and songwriter who represented San Marino in the Eurovision Song Contest 2018 in Lisbon, Portugal, with the song "Who We Are", alongside Jessika. She previously participated in the talent show The Winner Is ... and in the eleventh season of the talent show Deutschland sucht den Superstar (English: "Germany is looking for the Superstar").

== Discography ==
=== Album ===
Title	Details
Recovery	Released: 4 November 2016; Label: Khb Music; Format: digital download, CD

=== Extended plays ===
Title	Details
My Sky	Released: 25 February 2013; Label: Copyright Control; Format: Digital download

=== Singles ===
==== As lead artist ====
Title	Year	Album
"Not That Guy"	2013	Non-album singles
"A New Me"	2014	Non-album singles
"Alive"	2014	Non-album singles
"Not That Guy" (Eike & Kaz Radio Edit)	2014	Non-album singles
"ASAP"	2015	Recovery
"Miracle"	2016	Recovery
"Remember"	2016	Recovery
"Breathe"	2017	Recovery
"Until the Morning Light"	2018	Non-album single

==== As featured artist ====
Title	Year	Album
"So etwas darf nicht passieren" (White Night featuring Jenifer Berning)	2011	Non-album singles
"Who We Are" (Jessika featuring Jenifer Berning)	2018	Non-album singles

Preceded by Valentina Monetta & Jimmie Wilson with "Spirit of the Night"	San Marino in the Eurovision Song Contest with Jessika; 2018	Succeeded by Serhat with "Say Na Na Na"
