= Megahit-International Mediterranean Song Contest =

Defunct annual international song contest

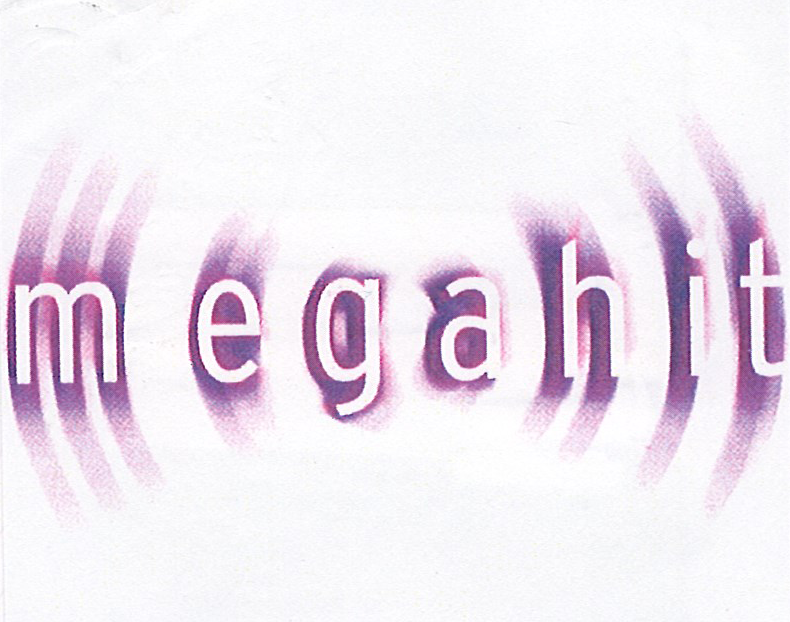

Date and venue
- Venue: Antalya, Turkey (2002); Fethiye, Muğla, Turkey (2003–2004)

Organisation
- Executive supervisor: Serhat Hacıpaşalıoğlu
- Host broadcaster: TRT (2003); Show TV (2004)
- Presenters: Serhat Hacıpaşalıoğlu (2002–2004); Tuğçe Kazaz (2002); Çağla Kubat (2002); Viktor Lazlo (2003); Azra Akın (2004); Deniz Seki (2004)

Participants
- Number of entries: 9 (2002); 14 (2003); 15 (2004)

Megahit-International Mediterranean Song Contest (Turkish: Megahit-Uluslararası Akdeniz Şarkı Yarışması) was an international song contest hosted in Turkey featuring singers from Mediterranean countries. There were three editions of the event. Nine countries participated in the first event, which was held in 2002 in Antalya. The second and third editions were organized in Fethiye, Muğla. The number of participants grew and reached 14 in 2003, and to 15 in 2004. The three contest winners were Eyal Shachar of Israel, Sedat Yüce of Turkey and Linda Valori of Italy, respectively.

== History ==
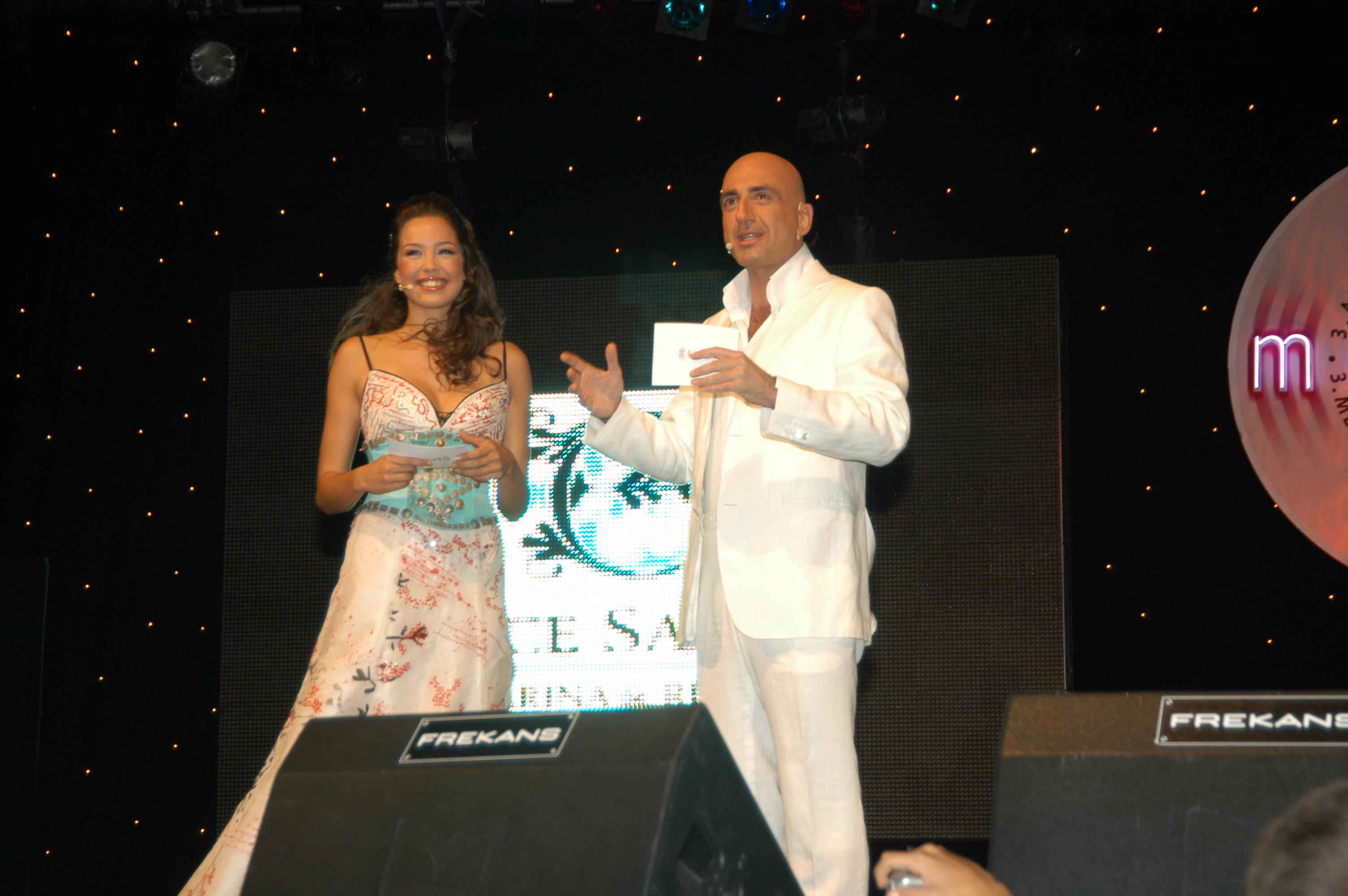
Azra Akın (left) and Serhat Hacıpaşalıoğlu during 2004 Megahit-International Mediterranean Song Contest.

Created by End Productions, the first edition of Megahit-International Mediterranean Song Contest (Turkish: Megahit-Uluslararası Akdeniz Şarkı Yarışması) was organized in Aspendos Theatre in Antalya on October 13, 2002. 9 Mediterranean countries participated in the contest, each represented by one performer. Serhat Hacıpaşalıoğlu, president of End Productions, hosted the event with Tuğçe Kazaz and Çağla Kubat. Israeli singer Eyal Shahar won the contest with "The Puppet Show". Croatian singer Goran Karan finished in second place with "I'm Falling Into Dark", with Hüseyin Özkılıç of Turkey placing third with "Bir Kez Daha". The winner of the contest was awarded $5,000 and a plate specially created for the event. Additionally, some contestants chosen by the jury were awarded with the International Federation of Festival Organizations (FIDOF) Special Prize and City of Antalya Special Prize.

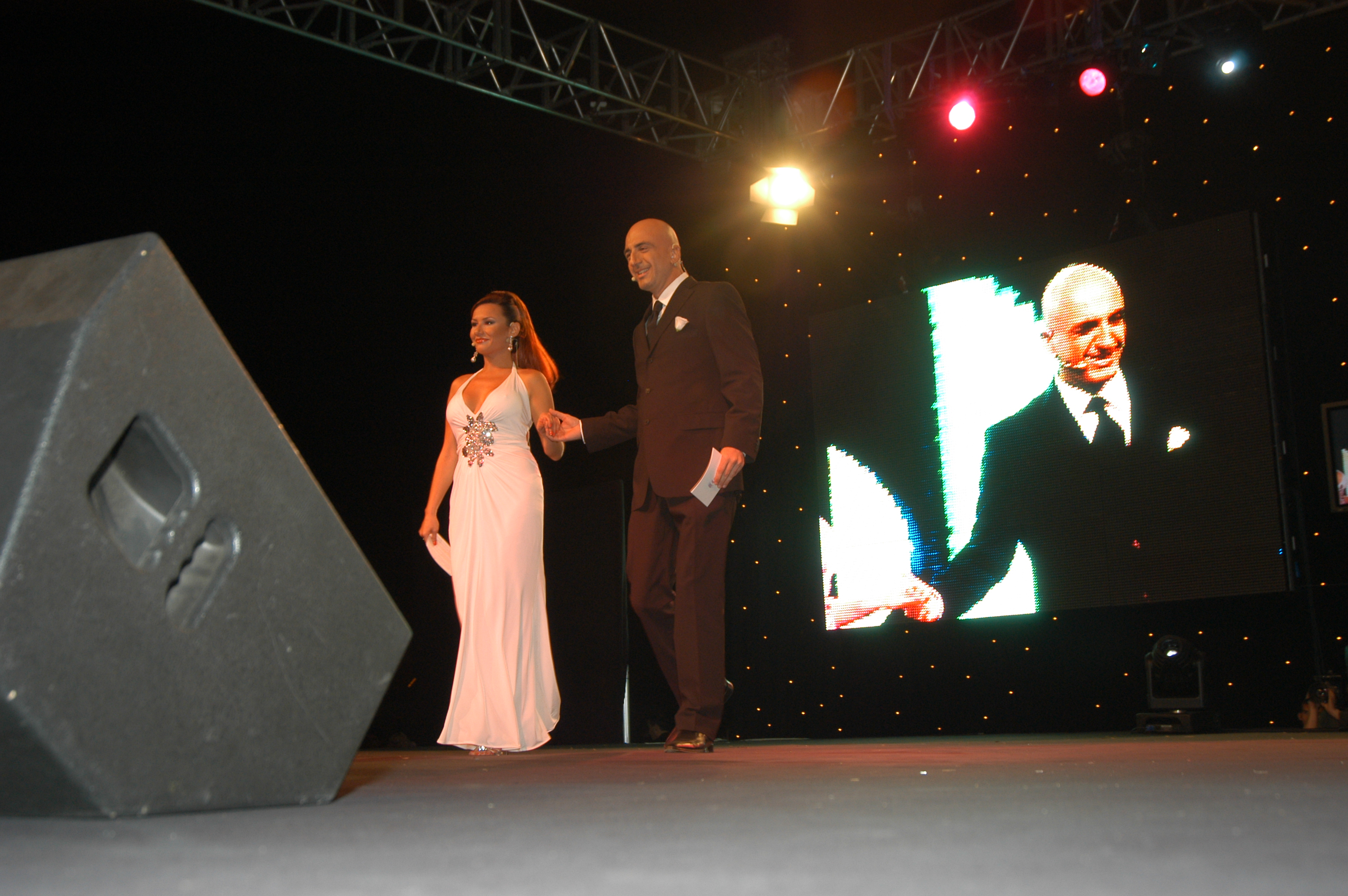
Deniz Seki (left) and Serhat Hacıpaşalıoğlu during 2004 Megahit-International Mediterranean Song Contest.

The second edition of the contest was organized in Fethiye Stadium, Fethiye, Muğla on September 27, 2003. There were 14 participating countries in the contest, which was hosted by Serhat Hacıpaşalıoğlu and Viktor Lazlo. Sedat Yüce from Turkey won the contest with "Nereye Kadar?". The International Federation of Festival Organizations Special Prize was given to Egyptian singer Amira Ahmed, and the Municipality of Fethiye Special Prize was given to Croatian singer Claudia Beni. The top three performers were awarded vacations from Lykia World. Furthermore, the event was named “best music festival of the year” by FIDOF, and Serhat Hacıpaşalıoğlu was awarded with the Annual Golden Transitional Media Ring of Friendship for his role as “best festival host of the year”. The contest was broadcast on TRT 1.

The third and final edition of the contest was held again in Fethiye Stadium on September 15, 2004 The number of participating countries raised to 15. This time, Azra Akın and Deniz Seki were the hosting partners of Serhat Hacıpaşalıoğlu. Italian performer Linda Valori won the contest with "E Vai" and was awarded a €10,000 prize. Julie & Ludwig from Malta earned second place with "Mood Swing", and Slovenian performer Nuša Derenda finished in third place with "Devil". The Lifetime Achievement Prize was awarded to Olcayto Ahmet Tuğsuz and Elias Rahbani, while the Fethiye Special Prizes were awarded to Greek contestant Chris Vamos and Portuguese contestant Ricardo Costa. The event was broadcast live on Show TV.

== Editions ==
Contest	Date	Host	Venue	Participants	Winner
1. Megahit-International Mediterranean Song Contest	October 13, 2002	Serhat Hacıpaşalıoğlu, Tuğçe Kazaz and Çağla Kubat	Aspendos Theatre, Antalya	9	Israel; Eyal Shachar, "The Puppet Show"
2. Megahit-International Mediterranean Song Contest	September 27, 2003	Serhat Hacıpaşalıoğlu and Viktor Lazlo	Fethiye Stadium, Fethiye	14	Turkey; Sedat Yüce, "Nereye Kadar"
3. Megahit-International Mediterranean Song Contest	September 15, 2004	Serhat Hacıpaşalıoğlu, Azra Akın and Deniz Seki	Fethiye Stadium, Fethiye	15	Italy; Linda Valori, "E Vai"

== Participants by year ==
=== 2002 ===
Country	Singer	Song
Bosnia and Herzegovina	Deen	"Lazi Me"
Croatia	Goran Karan	"I'm Falling Into Dark"
Israel	Eyal Shahar	"The Puppet Show"
Italy	Franco Masi	"Il Filo"
Egypt	Donia Samir Ghanem	"Peace and Love"
Slovenia	Jade	"Tisoc"
Turkey	Hüseyin Özkılıç	"Bir Kez Daha"
Yugoslavia	Jellena	"Carobnjak"
Greece	Sofia Arvaniti	"Na min figis pote"

- Note: Georgina was going to represent Malta with "Fomm il-Vjolin", but later she rejected from the contest.

=== 2003 ===
Country	Singer	Song
Albania	Ardjan Trebicka	"Si Vere E Embel Ti Me Je"
Bosnia and Herzegovina	Amila Glamočak	"Kao Leptir"
France	Soliman	"Cemile"
Croatia	Claudia Beni	"Bolesna"
Spain	Dulce	"Déjame"
Israel	Ketti el-Hay	"Pina Balev"
Italy	L'aura	"No Man's Land"
Lebanon	Fady	"Les yeux de Leyla"
Malta	Gunther Chetcuti	"Light of My Life"
Egypt	Amira Ahmed	"Ma Ashikna"
Serbia and Montenegro	Želimir	"Give Me One More Chance"
Slovenia	Tinkara Kovač	"Reason Why"
Turkey	Sedat Yüce	"Nereye Kadar"
Greece	Nikos Vertis	"Asteri Mou"

=== 2004 ===
Country	Singer	Song
Albania	Eneda Tarifa	"Sye Tek Ti"
Bosnia and Herzegovina	Nermin Puškar	"Prepolovljena jabuka"
France	Anne Warin	"Tolerance"
Croatia	Goran Karan	"People are the Energy"
Spain	Mike Vera	"Dame de tu amor"
Israel	Adi Alfasi	"Yatsata Gadol"
Italy	Linda Valori	"E Vai"
Lebanon	Aline Lahoud	"It's Over"
Malta	Julie & Ludwig	"Mood Swing"
Egypt	Ayat	"Koun aw la Takoun"
Portugal	Ricardo Costa	"Ao Carteiro de Neruda"
Serbia and Montenegro	Madame Piano-Franco Masi	"Un Incontro Per Sempre"
Slovenia	Nuša Derenda	"Devil"
Turkey	Burçin-Tamer	"Suskun Aşkım"
Greece	Chris Vamos	"Always and Forever"
