= San Marino in the Eurovision Song Contest 2018 =

- Eurovision Song Contest 2018
- Participating broadcaster: San Marino RTV (SMRTV)
- Country: San Marino
- Selection process: 1in360
- Selection date: 3 March 2018

Competing entry
- Song: "Who We Are"
- Artist: Jessika feat. Jenifer Brening
- Songwriters: Mathias Strasser; Christof Straub; Zoë Straub; Jenifer Brening; Stefan Moessle

Placement
- Semi-final result: Failed to qualify (17th)

Participation chronology

San Marino was represented at the Eurovision Song Contest 2018, held in Lisbon, Portugal. The Sammarinese national broadcaster San Marino RTV (SMRTV) partnered with the London-based company 1in360 to stage an online search for their entrant, marking the first time the nation did not select their representative internally. The process, entitled 1in360, culminated in an 11-participant final with acts chosen from three wildcard selection processes and two 11-act showcase events. The winner of 1in360 was "Who We Are" performed by Jessika featuring Jenifer Brening. The 2018 entry in the Eurovision Song Contest was promoted through performances in London, Amsterdam, Madrid and Lisbon as well as a 10-week anti-bullying campaign to raise money for the Diana Award. San Marino performed fourth in the second semi-final, held on 10 May 2018, and placed 17th with 28 points, failing to qualify for the final.

== Background ==
Prior to the 2018 contest, San Marino had participated in the Eurovision Song Contest eight times since their first entry in 2008. The nation's debut entry in the 2008 contest, "Complice" performed by Miodio, failed to qualify for the final and placed last in the semi-final it competed in. San Marino subsequently did not participate in both the 2009 and 2010 contests, citing financial difficulties. They returned in 2011 with Italian singer Senit performing "Stand By", which also failed to take the nation to the final. From 2012 to 2014, San Marino sent Valentina Monetta to the contest on three consecutive occasions, which made her the first singer to participate in three consecutive contests since Udo Jürgens, who competed in 1964, 1965 and 1966 for Austria. Monetta's entries in 2012 ("The Social Network Song") and 2013 ("Crisalide (Vola)") also failed to qualify San Marino to the final, however in 2014, she managed to bring the nation to the final for the first time with "Maybe", placing 24th. This marked their best placing to this point. The nation's next three entries, "Chain of Lights" performed by Anita Simoncini and Michele Perniola for 2015, "I Didn't Know" by Serhat for 2016 and "Spirit of the Night" by Monetta and Jimmie Wilson for 2017, did not qualify for the final.

San Marino RTV (SMRTV) confirmed San Marino's participation in the Eurovision Song Contest 2018 on 17 October 2017 and revealed that the nation would pursue a national final to select their entry for the first time.

== Before Eurovision ==
=== 1in360 ===
On 17 October 2017, in a press conference to the foreign press of Rome, SMRTV director general Carlo Romeo and Sammarinese Head of Delegation Alessandro Capicchioni announced the broadcaster's partnership with 1in360 to organise their selection process for the Eurovision Song Contest 2018. As announced, the entrant were to be selected through an online talent show with no restrictions on citizenship or musical genres. 1in360 consisted of three shows: two non-competitive showcase shows on 9 and 16 February and a final on 3 March 2018. The first showcase show involved each of the 11 candidates performing one of their two candidate songs in acoustic versions. During the second showcase show, each candidate performed their remaining candidate song in acoustic versions and one song per artist qualified for the final, where the winner was selected. The first two shows were pre-recorded, whereas the final was broadcast live from Bratislava, Slovakia by SMRTV through a terrestrial broadcast, satellite and on the YouTube channel of 1in360. The event was presented by Nick Earles and Kristin Stein.

==== Format ====
The results of the first two shows were determined by a jury panel of music professionals, while the results in the final were determined by the 50/50 combination of votes from the jury and a public online. The ranking of both the jury and online vote were converted to points from 1–8, 10 and 12. As it was initially announced, there would have been two methods for public voting. The crowdfunding option that was ultimately selected would have served as one part (albeit with a minimal investment of €20) and voting with PayPal would have served as the other part. Each PayPal account would have been limited to one vote at €1. As the number of PayPal votes increased, their weight of the overall vote would increase. The percentages would have been as follows: 10% if not more than 50,000 votes were cast; 20% for between 50,000 and 100,000 votes; 30% for between 100,000 and 200,000 votes; 40% for between 200,000 and 250,000 votes; and 50% if more than 250,000 votes were cast. The jury panel for the shows consisted of Austrian representative in the Eurovision Song Contest 2016 Zoë Straub, Capicchioni, Slovak entrepreneur Ladislav Kossár and English songwriter Neon Hitch. For the final's jury panel, Neon Hitch was replaced by SMRTV's frequent Eurovision commentator and spokesperson John Kennedy O'Connor, after she was unable to appear due to poor weather conditions.

==== Competing entries ====
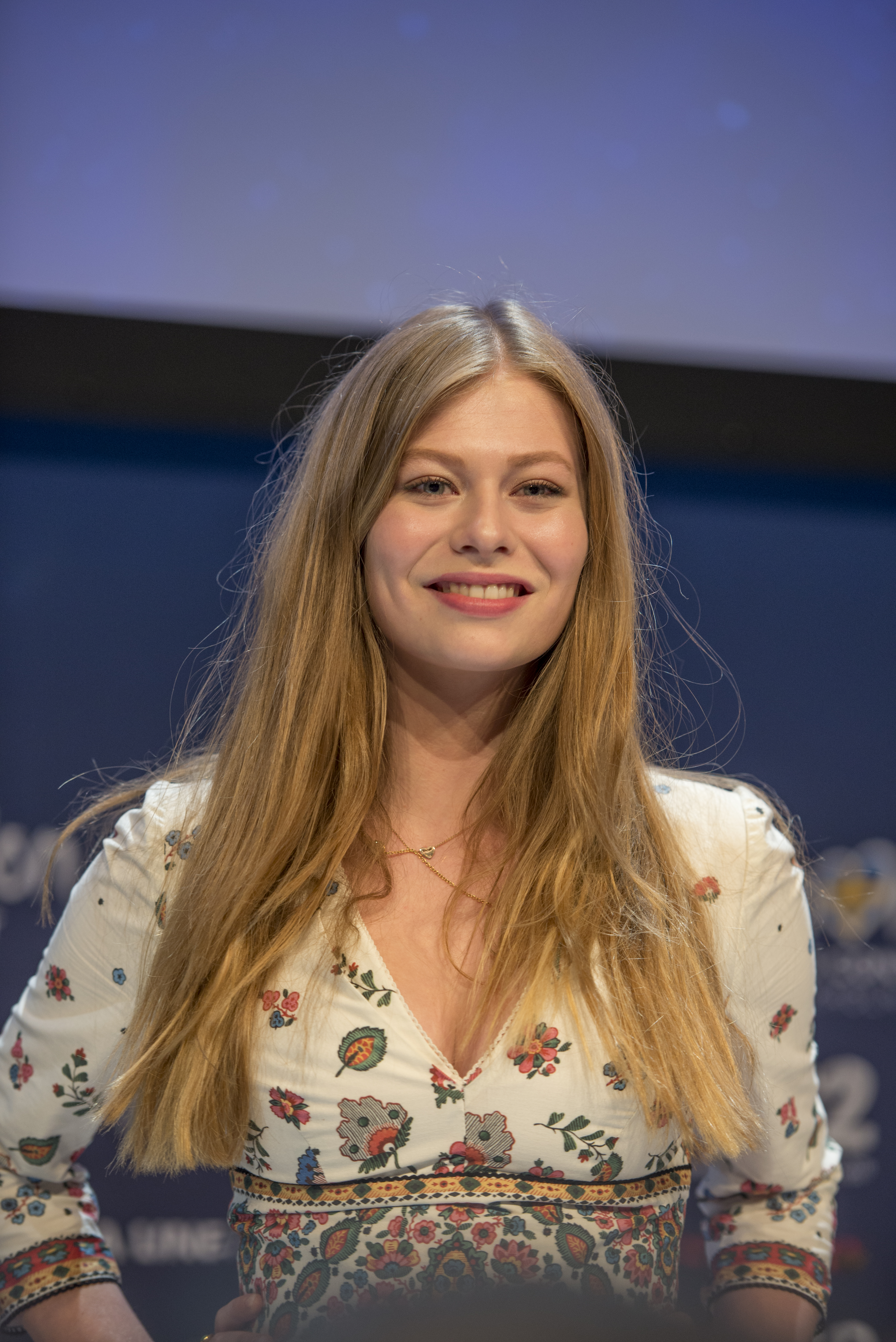
Austrian representative in the Eurovision Song Contest 2016 Zoë Straub contributed to the writing of all but two of the songs and was a member of the jury panel.

Artists were able to submit applications by uploading covers and original songs to the 1in360 website until 30 November 2017. A total of 1,050 applications were received during the five-week submission window, with candidates submitting from 75 countries. 11 candidates were shortlisted: eight nominated by the 1in360 jury in consultation with SMRTV and three selected as wildcards. The three wildcards consisted of one entrant from San Marino selected by the event organisers, one as selected by Eurovision fan clubs and one decided by an online vote. The candidates were announced on 23 December 2017. After the list was released, all candidates attended a song writing camp in Vienna, Austria, where they prepared to perform the variety of styles and genres that would be expected of them as part of the process. At the camp, songwriters, producers and candidates collaborated to develop their entries. Entrants could provide their own music and/or lyrics or work with others to write their candidate songs. Straub was added to the songwriting credits for all but two of the songs, while Jenifer Brening penned four entries as a singer-songwriter. The live acoustic performances of the competing songs from the first two shows were released as an album and for digital download on 19 February 2018 and the fully produced versions of the songs were made available no later than 23 February 2018.

==== Wildcard selection ====
The first wildcard was awarded by members of international fan clubs that applied for participation in the selection. 1in360 accepted applications for interested fan clubs until 23 November 2017 and announced the included fan clubs the next day; selected fan clubs then had to cast their votes by 1 December. The selected fan clubs consisted of those representing Germany, France, the United Kingdom, Ireland, Italy, Greece, Hungary, Malta, Belgium, the rest of the world and ESC Press. 70 acts were shortlisted for the first wildcard and they were announced on 24 November 2017. Following the tallying of the votes, Emma Sandström was announced on 4 December 2017 as the first wildcard to qualify for the 1in360 final.

The second wildcard was chosen through an online poll on the 1in360 website; all of the likes for the competing entries on the website were reset to zero following the selection of the fan club entry for the first wildcard. The public then voted for their preferred entry, with the highest vote receiver becoming the second wildcard entry. A total of 557 entries were listed on the website's candidate page for the public to choose from. The candidate with the most votes, Giovanni Montalbano, was announced on 11 December 2017. The selection process for the second wildcard received allegations of fraud, with event organisers responding that there is "very little [they] can do to prevent fraud in a free social media vote". This was in response to a number of candidates amassing tens of thousands of votes in a short period of time. Organisers elaborated that their intent was to make the selection process as inclusive as possible and some of the mechanisms to reduce fraud, such as requiring fans to pay a small amount of money to vote, would not have aligned with that goal. They went on to emphasise that the 2018 entry was set out to be what they described as an internet candidate, selected with "all the good and bad things that this entails" and that those who are not satisfied with the wildcard results still have the opportunity to vote accordingly in the live shows.

The third wildcard was reserved for an artist from San Marino. Eight acts (of the 1,050 submitted to 1in360) were eligible to be the third wildcard: Alessandra Busignani, Alibi, Simoncini, Fabrizio Valentini, Fiorella Giudi, Gianluigi Colucci, Irol and Jimmi JDKA. On 20 December 2017, SMRTV and 1in360 announced Irol as the third wildcard during a video posted to SMRTV's website and presented by four time representative for San Marino Valentina Monetta. Irol was the Sammarinese spokesperson who announced San Marino's 12-point vote during the final of the Eurovision Song Contest 2016 and was a past winner on SMRTV's Città di San Marino talent show.

First wildcard results – 4 December 2017
Artist	Points	Place
Emma Sandström	51	1
Franklin Calleja	49	2
Sada Vidoo	36	3
Tiago Braga	35	4
Yana Glushak	31	5
Domenico Caringella	29	6
Judah Gavra	24	7
Justinas Stanislovaitis	24	8
Mahan Moin	20	9
Rick Jurthe	20	10

Second wildcard results – 11 December 2017
Artist	Votes	Place
Giovanni Montalbano	388,633	1
Gloria Zaccaria	382,337	2
Julian Lesinski	203,579	3

==== Heats ====
The two heats took place on the respective dates of 9 and 16 February 2018 and consisted of pre-recorded acoustic performances. Each of the 11 acts had one of their two songs presented during each show. After the second show, the jury selected one song from each act to proceed to the final. The judging panel consisted of Straub, Capicchioni, Kossár and Neon Hitch. During the show, the jury also provided commentary and feedback to the artists.

Heat 1 – 9 February 2018
R/O	Artist(s)	Song	Result
1	Emma Sandström	"Diamonds"	Advanced
2	Irol feat. Jessika	"Stuck Without Me"	—N/a
3	Giovanni Montalbano	"Per quello che mi dai"	Advanced
4	Basti	"Moonlight"	—N/a
5	Judah Gavra	"Stay"	Advanced
6	Tinashe Makura	"We Are One"	—N/a
7	Jessika feat. Irol	"Who We Are"	Advanced
8	Sara de Blue	"Until the Morning Light"	—N/a
9	Jenifer Brening	"Sorry"	—N/a
10	Franklin Calleja	"Best Years of Our Lives"	—N/a
11	Camilla North	"Free Yourself"	—N/a

Heat 2 – 16 February 2018
R/O	Artist	Song	Result
1	Emma Sandström	"Hold On"	—N/a
2	Irol feat. Basti	"Sorry"	Advanced
3	Giovanni Montalbano	"Immenso blu"	—N/a
4	Basti	"Stay"	Advanced
5	Judah Gavra	"Moonlight"	—N/a
6	Tinashe Makura	"Free Yourself"	Advanced
7	Jessika	"Out of the Twilight"	—N/a
8	Sara de Blue	"Out of the Twilight"	Advanced
9	Jenifer Brening	"Until the Morning Light"	Advanced
10	Franklin Calleja	"Stay"	Advanced
11	Camilla North	"Yo no soy tu chica"	Advanced

==== Final ====
The final was held on 3 March 2018 and was broadcast live from Bratislava, Slovakia by SMRTV through a terrestrial broadcast, satellite and on the YouTube channel of 1in360. The results were determined by the 50/50 combination of votes from the jury and a crowdfunding online vote. The crowdfunding vote consisted of the results from crowdfunding, where users could invest between €2 and €8,000 to the songs on the website Global Rockstar. The crowdfunding also entitled investors to royalty payments for streams and downloads of the songs. The ranking of both the jury and crowdfunding vote were converted to points from 1–8, 10 and 12. All songs that received over €8,000 in investments would receive 12 points and the rest of the pool of points will be reduced accordingly (the highest investments received 12 points, and if two songs got the same highest investments, both of them received 12 points, with the next highest-placed entry receiving 8 points instead of 10). The jury for the final consisted of Straub, Capicchioni, Kossàr and John Kennedy O'Connor.

Final – 3 March 2018
R/O	Artist(s)	Song	Jury	Crowdfunding vote	Total	Place
1	Camilla North	"Yo no soy tu chica"	5	12	17	5
2	Judah Gavra	"Stay"	0	1	1	11
3	Tinashe Makura	"Free Yourself"	3	3	6	7
4	Giovanni Montalbano	"Per quello che mi dai"	6	12	18	4
5	Irol feat. Basti	"Sorry"	2	0	2	10
6	Jessika feat. Jenifer Brening (Note: The selected song had initially been presented during the shows with fellow candidate Irol being the featured artist; however, he was replaced by Brening for the final as he felt the song was not true to his style.)	"Who We Are"	10	12	22	1
7	Basti	"Stay"	1	4	5	9
8	Emma Sandström	"Diamonds"	4	2	6	7
9	Sara de Blue	"Out of the Twilight"	8	12	20	2
10	Jenifer Brening	"Until the Morning Light"	7	12	19	3
11	Franklin Calleja	"Stay"	12	5	17	5

=== Promotion ===
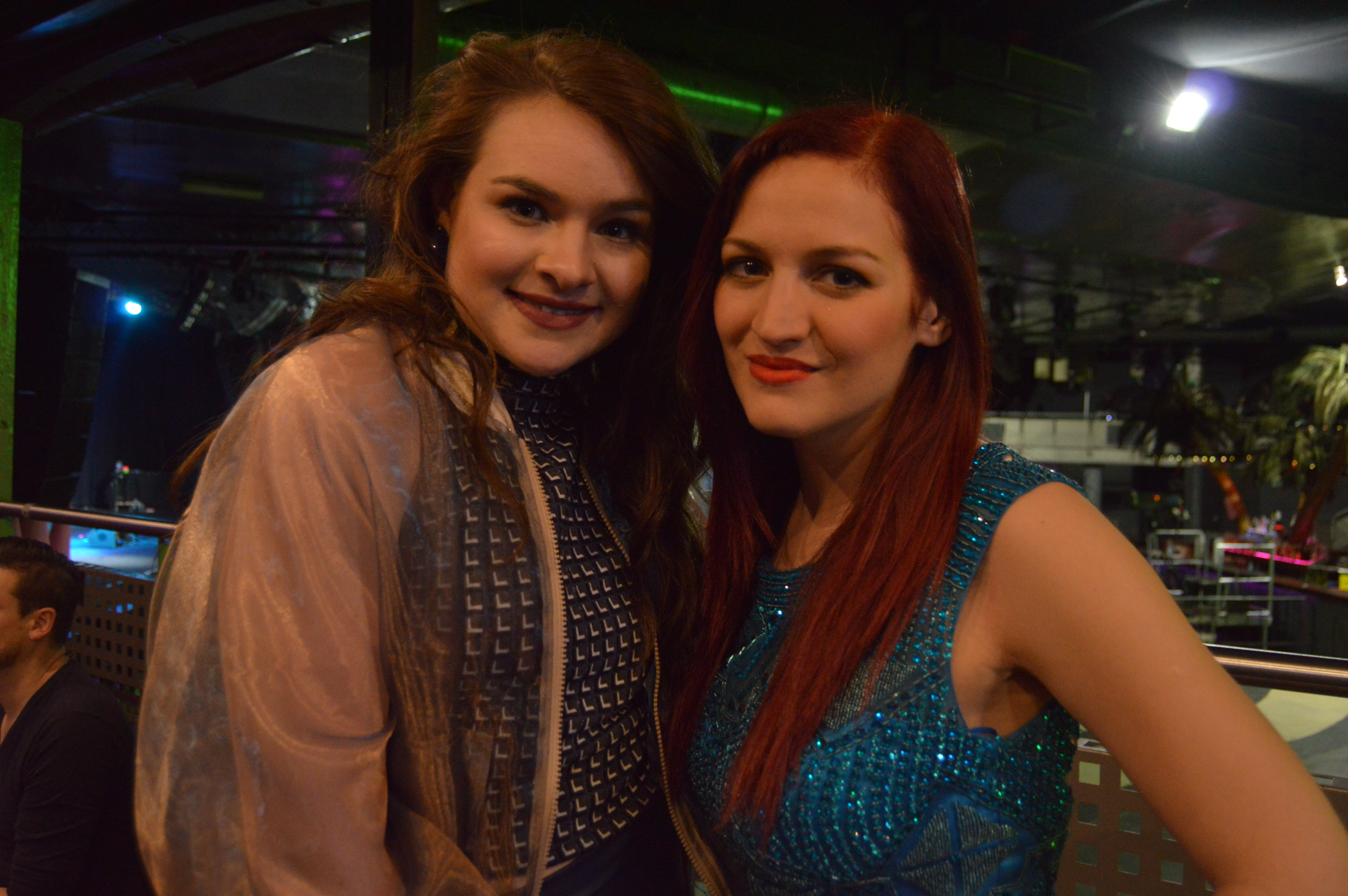
Jessika (right) and Jenifer Brening (left) at the ESPreParty in Madrid on 21 April 2018.

To promote the entry, Jessika and Brening made a number of appearances throughout Europe. They performed for a Eurovision party at London's Cafe de Paris on 6 April 2018, followed by an appearance on 14 April in the annual Eurovision in Concert series, an event held at AFAS Live in Amsterdam, Netherlands that was staged to serve as a preview party for the year's entries. A week later, the two took part in the second annual ESPreParty at La Riviera in Madrid, hosted by the website Eurovision-Spain.com and broadcast on Spanish broadcaster RTVE's website. During the week of the contest, Jessika and Brening performed at the second annual ESC Bubble Party at EuroCafe in Lisbon – MoMe Nightclub on 9 May 2018.

As "Who Are We" is described by the singers as a song about facing the difficulties of harassment and demeaning attitudes, the duo also staged a 10-week anti-bullying campaign, traveling Europe and meeting fans to raise money for charities in support of the cause. Proceeds of the initiative were donated to the Diana Award at the campaign's end during an event held in Lisbon.

== At Eurovision ==
The Eurovision Song Contest 2018 took place at the Altice Arena in Lisbon, Portugal. It consisted of two semi-finals held on 8 and 10 May, respectively, and the final on 12 May 2018. All nations with the exceptions of the host country and the "Big Five", consisting of France, Germany, Italy, Spain and the United Kingdom, were required to qualify from one of two semi-finals to compete for the final; the top 10 countries from each semi-final progress to the final. Semi-finalists were allocated into six different pots based on voting patterns from previous contests as determined by the contest's televoting partner Digame, with the aim of reducing the chance of neighbourly voting between countries while also increasing suspense during the voting process. On 29 January 2018, an allocation draw was held at Lisbon City Hall which placed each country into one of the two semi-finals and determined which half of the show they would perform in. San Marino was placed into the second semi-final, to be held on 10 May 2018, and was scheduled to perform in the first half of the show.

Once all the competing songs for the 2018 contest had been released, the running order for the semi-finals was decided by the shows' producers rather than through another draw, so that similar songs were not placed next to each other. San Marino was set to perform in position four, following the entry from Serbia and preceding the entry from Denmark.

The two semi-finals and the final were broadcast in San Marino on both SMRTV and Radio San Marino with commentary by Lia Fiorio and Gigi Restivo. O'Connor served as the Sammarinese spokesperson, who announced the votes awarded by the Sammarinese jury during the final.

=== Semi-final ===
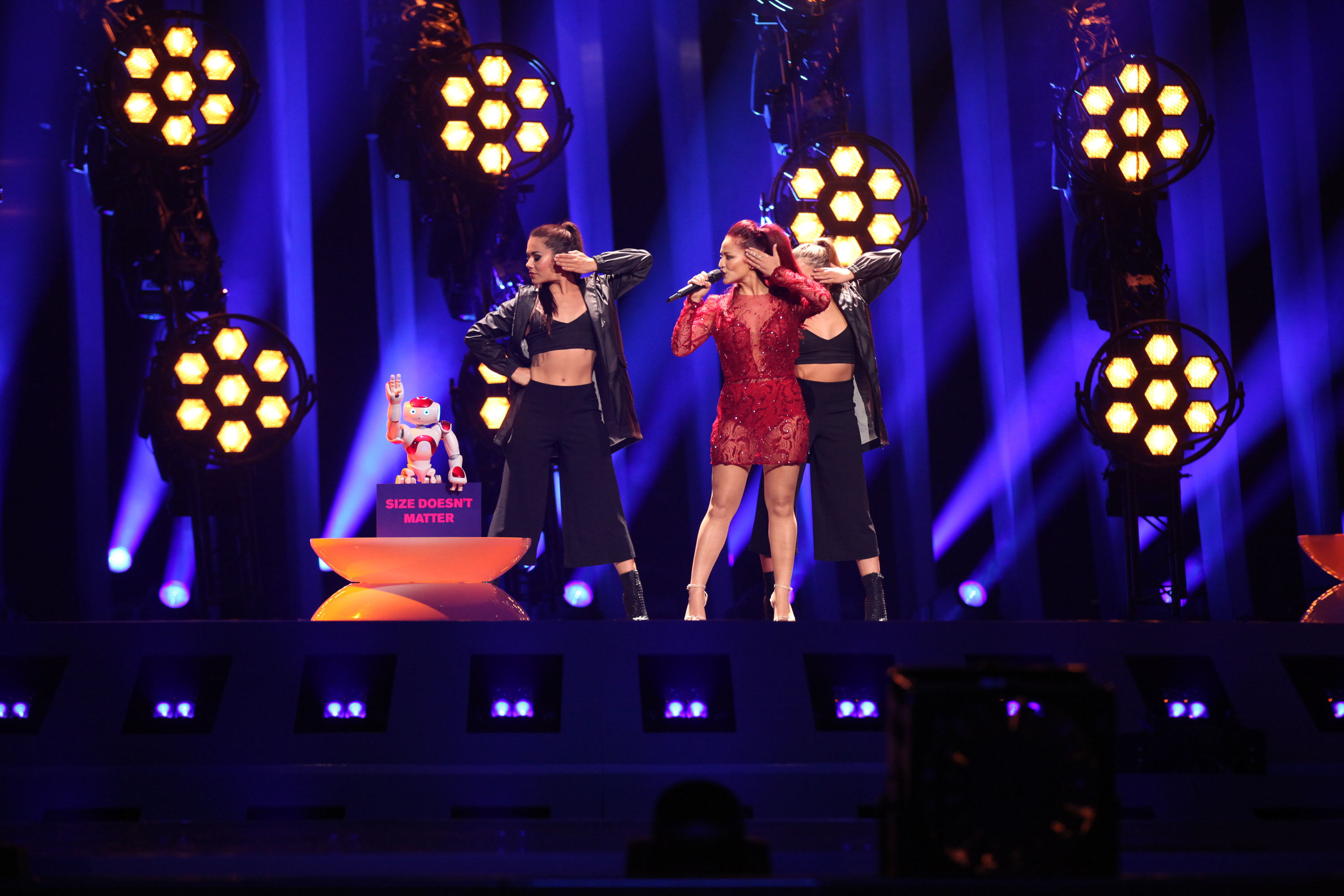
Jessika and Jenifer Brening performing "Who We Are" during a rehearsal for the Eurovision Song Contest 2018.

Jessika and Brening took part in dress rehearsals on 1 and 4 May 2018. The jury final where professional juries of each country, responsible for 50 percent of each country's vote, watch and vote on the competing entries, took place on 9 May.

For the performance at the semi-final, Jessika and Brening were joined by fellow 1in360 entrant Basti Schmidt, who provided backing vocals. The stage show featured the duo on stage surrounded by two background dancers and four robots that held up signs reading phrases including "size doesn't matter" and "sometimes". The performance opened with the robots and backing dancers on stage with Jessika in a red lacy dress; Brening later joined the stage for her rap section of the song.

At the end of the show, San Marino failed to qualify for the final, not being announced among the top 10 nations. It was later revealed that San Marino placed 17th in the semi-final, receiving a total of 28 points.

=== Voting ===
Voting during the three shows involved each country awarding two sets of points from 1–8, 10 and 12: one from their expert jury and the other from televoting. Each nation's jury consisted of five music industry professionals who are citizens of the country they represent. The jury judged each entry based on: vocal capacity; the stage performance; the song's composition and originality; and the overall impression by the act. No member of a national jury was permitted to be connected in any way to any of the competing acts in such a way that they cannot vote impartially and independently. Below is a breakdown of points awarded to San Marino and awarded by nation in the second semi-final and the final of the contest, respectively, and the breakdown of the jury voting and televoting conducted during the two shows.

==== Points awarded to San Marino ====
Points awarded to San Marino (Semi-final 2)
Score	Televote	Jury
12 points	Malta	
10 points		
8 points		
7 points		
6 points		
5 points		Italy; Romania
4 points		
3 points		Malta
2 points	Australia	
1 point		Russia

==== Points awarded by San Marino ====
Points awarded by San Marino (Semi-final 2)
Score	Aggregated televote	Jury
12 points	Denmark	Sweden
10 points	Ukraine	Moldova
8 points	Hungary	Malta
7 points	Norway	Norway
6 points	Moldova	Serbia
5 points	Sweden	Latvia
4 points	Australia	Netherlands
3 points	Slovenia	Slovenia
2 points	Netherlands	Poland
1 point	Russia	Ukraine

Points awarded by San Marino (Final)
Score	Aggregated televote	Jury
12 points	Israel	Israel
10 points	Czech Republic	Germany
8 points	Italy	Sweden
7 points	Cyprus	Moldova
6 points	Denmark	Slovenia
5 points	Ukraine	Estonia
4 points	Germany	Italy
3 points	Ireland	Serbia
2 points	Moldova	Australia
1 point	United Kingdom	Ireland

==== Detailed voting results ====
The following members comprised the Sammarinese jury:

- Augusto Ciavatta (jury chairperson) – music teacher, organiser of international music events and competitions
- Ilaria Ercolani – former Eurovision Song Contest artist, singer, dancer
- Veronica Conti – cello player
- Nicolas Burioni (Lo Strego) – singer, songwriter
- Claudio Podeschi – trombonist

Detailed voting results from San Marino (Semi-final 2)
R/O	Country	Jury							Aggregated televote	
R/O	Country	A. Ciavatta	I. Ercolani	V. Conti	Lo Strego	C. Podeschi	Rank	Points	Rank	Points
01	Norway	11	3	8	2	9	4	7	4	7
02	Romania	16	12	2	10	8	12		16	
03	Serbia	6	14	9	7	1	5	6	15	
04	San Marino									
05	Denmark	8	13	14	17	12	13		1	12
06	Russia	17	11	12	13	10	14		10	1
07	Moldova	1	6	1	12	3	2	10	5	6
08	Netherlands	4	1	13	14	11	7	4	9	2
09	Australia	12	10	11	3	7	11		7	4
10	Georgia	9	16	17	15	16	15		14	
11	Poland	14	2	15	4	13	9	2	12	
12	Malta	5	7	3	5	2	3	8	11	
13	Hungary	15	15	10	16	17	17		3	8
14	Latvia	10	8	4	6	4	6	5	13	
15	Sweden	2	4	5	1	5	1	12	6	5
16	Montenegro	13	17	16	11	15	16		17	
17	Slovenia	3	9	7	9	6	8	3	8	3
18	Ukraine	7	5	6	8	14	10	1	2	10

Detailed voting results from San Marino (Final)
R/O	Country	Jury							Aggregated televote	
R/O	Country	A. Ciavatta	I. Ercolani	V. Conti	Lo Strego	C. Podeschi	Rank	Points	Rank	Points
01	Ukraine	21	18	25	20	18	25		6	5
02	Spain	16	23	8	11	15	19		25	
03	Slovenia	7	10	2	23	8	5	6	24	
04	Lithuania	19	25	22	17	13	23		19	
05	Austria	24	9	7	14	22	18		14	
06	Estonia	5	13	13	2	25	6	5	11	
07	Norway	14	16	19	12	19	21		15	
08	Portugal	25	11	23	7	5	15		26	
09	United Kingdom	9	17	3	19	14	13		10	1
10	Serbia	13	20	10	18	1	8	3	13	
11	Germany	3	5	4	3	9	2	10	7	4
12	Albania	15	19	21	21	26	24		22	
13	France	22	4	20	5	20	12		18	
14	Czech Republic	17	8	15	4	10	11		2	10
15	Denmark	11	14	17	26	3	14		5	6
16	Australia	18	7	16	9	4	9	2	17	
17	Finland	20	22	18	22	11	22		20	
18	Bulgaria	10	21	5	8	24	16		12	
19	Moldova	1	15	9	16	6	4	7	9	2
20	Sweden	8	1	14	6	7	3	8	21	
21	Hungary	26	26	26	25	16	26		16	
22	Israel	6	2	1	1	2	1	12	1	12
23	Netherlands	12	3	24	24	23	17		23	
24	Ireland	4	12	6	13	21	10	1	8	3
25	Cyprus	23	24	12	10	12	20		4	7
26	Italy	2	6	11	15	17	7	4	3	8
