= Golden Stag Festival =

Romanian music festival

Golden Stag Festival Cerbul de Aur
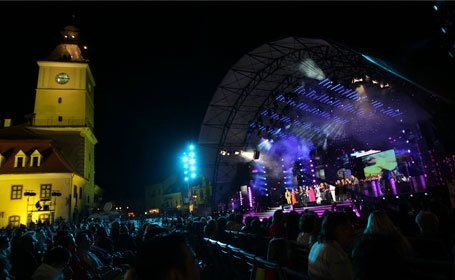
- The festival takes place on the Piața Sfatului plaza in front of the old city hall
- Genre: Various
- Dates: August
- Locations: Brașov, Transylvania, Romania
- Years active: 1968–1971, 1992–97, 2001–05, 2008–09, 2018–2019
- Founders: Televiziunea Română (TVR)
- Website: Official website

The Golden Stag Festival (Romanian: Cerbul de Aur) is an international pop song contest, festival, and award show, held annually in the Piața Sfatului of Braşov, Romania.

First held in 1968, the festival honors musical talents both in Romania and abroad.

Non-Romanian honorees who have participated in the festival include Josephine Baker, Pia Colombo, Dalida, Diana Ross, Amália Rodrigues, Julio Iglesias, Sheryl Crow, Tom Jones, Coolio, Christina Aguilera, Kenny Rogers, Ricky Martin, The Kelly Family, Jerry Lee Lewis and Patricia Kaas.

Culturally significant non-musician Romanians, such as cartoonist Ștefan Popa-Popas, have also participated.

== History ==
The Golden Stag was first held in 1968, but after 1971 it was banned by the Communist leadership. After the fall of Communism, new editions were organised starting from 1992. Between 2010 and 2017 the festival wasn't held due to lack of funds. It returned in 2018.

The Golden Stag Festival takes place during the summer and is broadcast live by Romanian TV station TVR1.

== Competition ==
Ed.	Year	Winner	1st Prize	2nd Prize	3rd Prize	Big Artists section
19	2019	(Italy) Eliza G.	(Austria) Sara de Blue	(Latvia) Ralphs Ellands	(Lithuania) Monika Marija	(Romania) Ștefan Bănică Jr., (Moldova) Irina Rimes, (England) Emeli Sandé, (Republic of Ireland) Ronan Keating, (Romania) Zoli Toth Project, (Romania) Laura Bretan, (Romania) Ester Peony, (Belgium) Olivier Kaye, (England) We Will Rock You, (Romania) Corina Chiriac, (France) Viktor Lazlo, (Romania) Gabi Luncă, (Romania) Loredana Groza, (Romania) Lidia Buble, (Romania) Alexandra Ungureanu, (Romania) Ionuţ Ungureanu, (Romania) Gheorghe Zamfir, (Moldova) Valentin Boghean, (Romania) Paula Seling, (Romania) Rodica Anghelescu
18	2018	(Albania) Inis Neziri	(Belgium) Olivier Kaye	(North Macedonia) Antonia Gigovska	(France) Kelly Joyce	(United States) Nicole Scherzinger, (Hungary) Edvin Marton, (Greece) Eleni Foureira, (England) James Blunt, (Scotland) Amy Macdonald, (Italy) Gigliola Cinquetti, (Romania) Andra, (Moldova) Carla's Dreams, (Romania) Delia Matache, (Romania) Loredana Groza, (Moldova) The Motans, (Romania) Flavius & Linda Teodosiu, (Portugal) Paulo Bragança, (Romania) The Humans, (Romania) Horia Brenciu
Festival not held between 2010 and 2017
17	2009	(Italy) Antonino	(Romania) The Marker	(Norway) Ovi Jacobsen	not awarded	(United States) Steve Vai, (Italy) Tiziano Ferro, (England) Hot Chocolate
16	2008	(Romania) Răzvan Krivach	(Sweden) Biondo	(Romania) Toni Poptămaş & Desperado	not awarded	(Ukraine) Ruslana, (England) Simply Red, (Romania) IRIS, (Romania) Ștefan Bănică Jr., (Romania) Mircea Baniciu, (Romania) Luminița Anghel, (Romania) Paula Seling
Festival not held between 2006 and 2007
15	2005	(Italy) Linda Valori	(Vanuatu) Vanessa Quai	(Romania) Andra	(Malta) Olivia Lewis	(Australia) Natalie Imbruglia, (England) Joe Cocker, (Moldova) O-Zone
14	2004	(Malta) Eleanor Cassar	(Romania) Slang	(Georgia (country)) Anri Jokhadze	(Argentina) Analia Selis	(United States) P!nk, (Germany) Thomas Anders, (Italy) Nino D'Angelo
13	2003	(China) Sha Baoliang	(Netherlands) Sister K	(Romania) Nico	(Bulgaria) Kaffe	(Puerto Rico) Ricky Martin, (Scotland) Simple Minds, (Romania) Holograf, (Romania) Vama Veche
12	2002	(Romania) Paula Seling	(Netherlands) Mike Peterson	(Moldova) Millenium	not awarded	(Republic of Ireland) The Kelly Family, (United States) Boyz II Men, (Germany) Scorpions, (Russia) t.A.T.u., (Australia) LASH
11	2001	(Romania) Proconsul	not awarded	not awarded	not awarded	(Australia) INXS, (England) UB40, (United States) Cyndi Lauper, (Romania) Holograf, (Romania) Ștefan Bănică Jr., (Romania) 3rei Sud Est
Festival not held between 1998 and 2000
10	1997	(Indonesia) Meiske Shakila Sherhalawan	not awarded	not awarded	not awarded	(United States) Diana Ross, (United States) Sheryl Crow, (United States) Big Mountain, (Germany) Masterboy, (Netherlands) Thérèse Steinmetz, (Romania) Gheorghe Zamfir, (Romania) Dan Spătaru, (United States) Christina Aguilera
9	1996	(Romania) Monica Anghel	(Republic of Ireland) Garrett Wall	(United States) Brenda K. Starr	(Turkey) Yeşim Dönüş Işın	(Wales) Tom Jones, (United States) Coolio, (Belgium) Vaya Con Dios, (England) Soul II Soul, (England) MN8, (France) La Bouche
8	1995	(Russia) Cramps in The Leg	(China) Luo Zongxu	(Norway) Jan Werner	(Indonesia) Eka Deli	(England) Status Quo, (United States) The Temptations, (United States) Kenny Rogers, (United States) MC Hammer, (United States) Belinda Carlisle, (Belgium) 2 Unlimited
7	1994	(United States) Worthy Davis	Indonesia AB Three	not awarded	not awarded	(United States) James Brown, (United States) Ray Charles, (United States) David Palmer, (United States) Commodores, (England) Paul Young, (England) Boy George, (Germany) Culture Beat
6	1993	(Lithuania) Arina Commodores	not awarded	not awarded	not awarded	(Australia) Kylie Minogue, (United States) Jerry Lee Lewis, (United States) Dionne Warwick, (Italy) Toto Cutugno
5	1992	(Indonesia) Trie Utami	not awarded	not awarded	not awarded	(France) Patricia Kaas, (United States) Sister Sledge, (Republic of Ireland) Johnny Logan, (Northern Ireland) Linda Martin, (Italy) Riccardo Fogli, (Romania) Angela Similea, (Moldova) Doina and Ion Aldea Teodorovici
Festival not held between 1972 and 1991
4	1971	(Sweden) Ann-Louise Hanson	not awarded	not awarded	not awarded	(Netherlands) Thérèse Steinmetz, (France) Charles Trenet, (Italy) Sergio Endrigo, (France) Enrico Macias, (France) Alain Barrière, (France) Dalida, (Romania) Doina Badea
3	1970	(Netherlands) Thérèse Steinmetz	not awarded	not awarded	not awarded	(United States) Connie Francis, (France) Josephine Baker, (United States) Memphis Slim, (Spain) Julio Iglesias, (France) Marie Laforêt, (Spain) Raphael, (Romania) Doina Badea
2	1969	(Romania) Luminița Dobrescu	not awarded	not awarded	not awarded	(France) Juliette Gréco, (England) Cliff Richard, (Austria) Udo Jürgens, (Italy) Gigliola Cinquetti, (Romania) Ilinca Cerbacev, (Romania) Margareta Pâslaru
1	1968	(Belgium) Jacques Hustin	not awarded	not awarded	not awarded	(Italy) Rita Pavone, (France) Gilbert Bécaud, (Portugal) Amália Rodrigues, (Italy) Caterina Caselli, (Italy) Bobby Solo, (England) Cliff Richard, (Romania) Constantin Drăghici
