= Deniz Seki =

Turkish singer, songwriter and composer (born 1970)

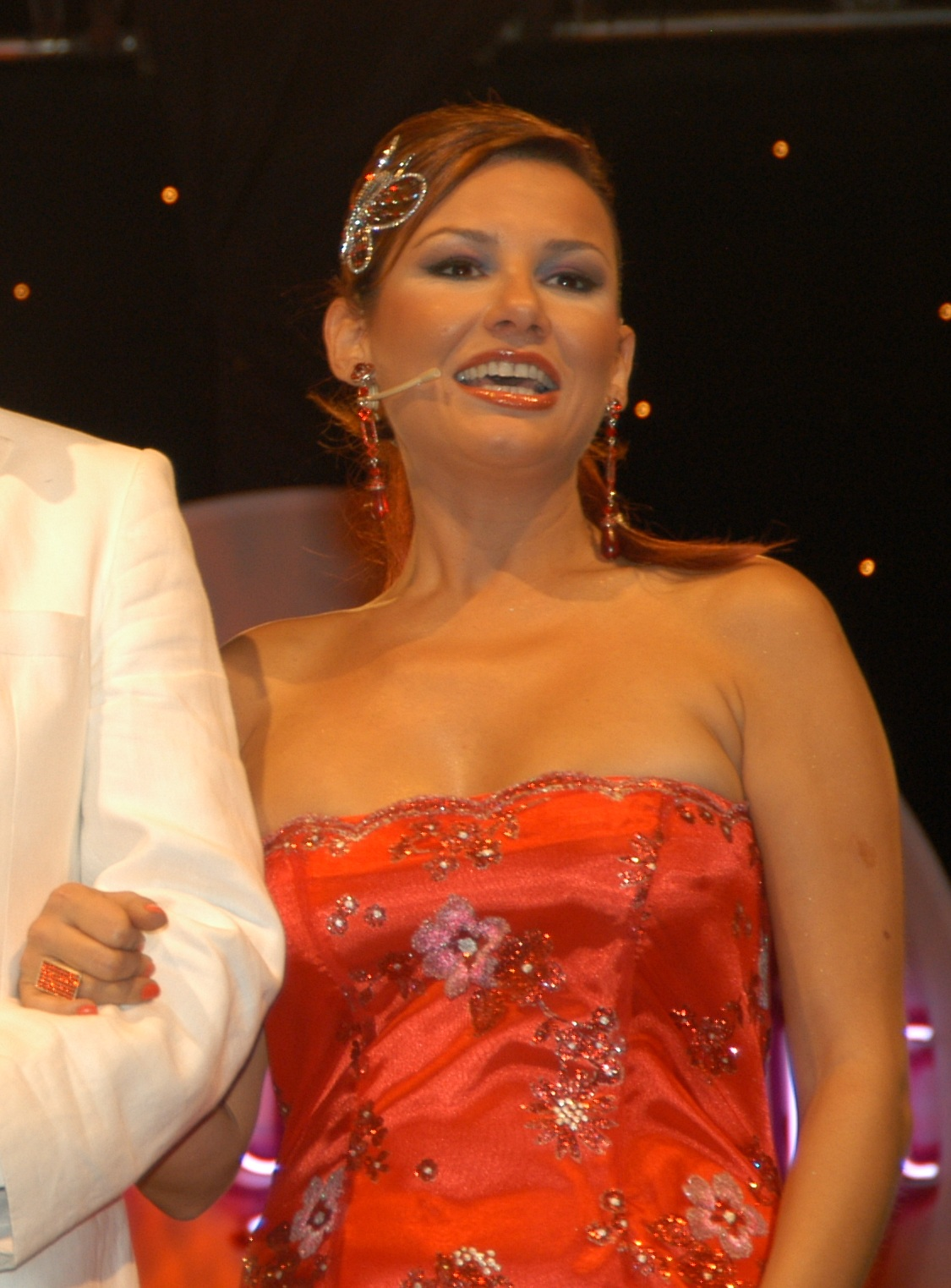
- Deniz Seki at the 2004 Megahit-International Mediterranean Song Contest
- Born: July 1, 1970 (age 56); Istanbul, Turkey
- Occupations: Singer-songwriter; composer; TV presenter
- Spouse: Turhan Başaranoğlu (m. 1989; div. 1992)
- Musical career
- Genres: Pop
- Instrument: Vocals
- Years active: 1995–present
- Labels: Raks; Özer; Seyhan; Poll
- Website: www.denizseki.com

Deniz Seki (born July 1, 1970) is a Turkish pop singer, songwriter and composer. She was convicted of drug trafficking in 2009 and served a prison sentence between 2014 and 2017.

== Personal life ==
Deniz Seki was born in Istanbul, Turkey on July 1, 1970. She has two younger brothers Serdar and Serkan. She completed her education in Çamlıca High School for Girls.

In 1989, Seki married businessman Turhan Başaranoğlu, a toy manufacturer. The marriage ended in divorce after three years. Between 2006 and 2009, she was in a relationship with clarinetist Hüsnü Şenlendirici, who was married at the time.

== Music career ==
After passing an audition, Seki joined the TRT. In 1993, she began her music career after meeting composer Melih Kibar, through whom she worked as a backing vocalist for Kenan Doğulu, Emel Müftüoğlu, Ege, Ferda Anıl Yarkın, Zuhal Olcay, and Yaşar Günaç. In 1995, she won first prize in the "Pop-Show 1995" song contest with lyrics she had written.

Seki released her debut album, Hiç Kimse Değilim, in 1997. She achieved wider recognition with her second album, Anlattım (1999), which featured many songs that she wrote and composed. She subsequently released Şeffaf (2002), Aşkların En Güzeli (2003), Aşk Denizi (2005), and Sahici (2008).

After performing in nearly one hundred concerts and television programs in 2011, Seki released Sözyaşlarım later that year. In 2013, she took part in the television music competition Veliaht, alongside singers including Nükhet Duru, Hande Yener, Cengiz Kurtoğlu, Musa Eroğlu, Niran Ünsal, Emre Altuğ, Kutsi, Rafet El Roman, and Kubat, in which established artists searched for their musical successors. She later released the albums İz (2014) and Uzun Hikaye (2018).

== Acting career ==
In 1999, she appeared in the film Can Dostum, starring Oktay Kaynarca and Yalçın Dümer. While serving her prison sentence, she made a guest appearance in a December 2015 episode of the ATV television series Eşkıya Dünyaya Hükümdar Olmaz, portraying a fellow inmate of Deniz Çakır's character.

== Drug trafficking crime ==
On February 13, 2009, Seki was detained by police on allegations of cocaine use. After being kept in detention for two days, she was released without charge; however, on February 23, 2009, Seki was rearrested by Drug Squad officers and detained at the gendarme station in Zekeriyaköy, Istanbul at the request of the public prosecutor. On February 24, 2010, she was detained in the Bakırköy Women's Prison for the duration of the trial. She was accused of drug trafficking crime. She asserted however, she was a drug addict only. Following her temporary release on November 2, 2010, after around seven months in detention, she vanished without a trace and did not appear in court any more. On May 22, 2012, she was charged for six years and three months in prison of drug trafficking crime. The seven months spent as a detainee was deducted from her sentence. On November 15, 2014, Seki was caught in her hideout at Esenyurt, Istanbul and arrested. She was put in prison the next day. After serving her sentence, she was released from the prison on June 5, 2017.

== Discography ==
Studio albums

- 1997: Hiç Kimse Değilim (Turkish: I Am No One)
- 1999: Anlattım (Turkish: I Said)
- 2002: Şeffaf (Turkish: Transparent)
- 2003: Aşkların En Güzeli (Turkish: The Most Beautiful of Loves)
- 2005: Aşk Denizi (Turkish: Sea of Love)
- 2008: Sahici (Turkish: Realist)
- 2011: Sözyaşlarım (Turkish: My Tearful Lyrics, a pun of "Söz" (lyrics) and "Gözyaşlarım" (tears)) (sales: 50,000+)
- 2014: İz (Turkish: Trace) (sales: 40,000+)
- 2018: Uzun Hikaye (Turkish: Long Story)
- 2023: Best of Akustik, Vol. 1

EPs

- 2017: Şükür Kavuşturana

Singles

- 2020: "Ala" (with Demet Akalın, Işın Karaca, Cansu Kurtçu)
- 2021: "Savaş ve Aşk"
- 2022: "Sızı"
- 2022: "Beni Derde Salan Gelsin" (Musa Eroğlu ile Bir Asır 2)
- 2022: "Aşktan Ölen Yok"
- 2023: "Cambaz"
- 2024: "Farzet Ki" (40 Yıl)
- 2024: "Benim Hikâyem"
- 2025: "İnsan Lekesi" (with Ozan Doğulu)

== Bibliography ==
- Seki, Deniz (2016). Deniz'in Dibi. Istanbul: İnkılap Kitabevi.
- Seki, Deniz (2017). Mutluluğa Söz Verdim. Istanbul: İnkılap Kitabevi.
