= Say Na Na Na =

2019 song by Serhat

Single by Serhat

from the album That's How I Feel
- Released: 7 March 2019
- Recorded: 2019
- Genre: Novelty
- Length: 2:58
- Label: CAP-Sounds
- Songwriters: Serhat; Mary Susan Applegate

Serhat singles chronology
| "Total Disguise" (2018) | "Say Na Na Na" (2019) | "Di Na Na Na" (2020) |

Music video
- "Say Na Na Na" on YouTube

Eurovision Song Contest 2019 entry
- Country: San Marino
- Artist: Serhat
- Language: English
- Composer: Serhat
- Lyricists: Serhat; Mary Susan Applegate

Finals performance
- Semi-final result: 8th
- Semi-final points: 150
- Final result: 19th
- Final points: 77

Entry chronology
- ◄ "Who We Are" (2018)
- "Freaky" (2020) ►

"Say Na Na Na" is a 2019 single by Turkish singer Serhat. The song represented San Marino after being internally selected by Radiotelevisione della Repubblica di San Marino (SMRTV), the Sanmarinese national broadcaster. The song was released on 7 March 2019. It finished 19th in the Grand Final of the Eurovision Song Contest 2019.

== Background ==
According to Serhat, he was called by Radiotelevisione della Repubblica di San Marino to make a song for Eurovision. Using his inner feelings, he wrote a song in five minutes. The station accepted the song.

The lyrics speak of cheering up a sad person, saying to look past dark times and to focus on good things.

== Music video ==
A music video was released for the song on the same day of the song's release.

== Eurovision Song Contest ==
=== Selection ===
After initially exploring the use of 1in360 for a second year, San Marino ultimately opted to return to an internal selection process. On 21 January 2019, Radiotelevisione della Repubblica di San Marino (SMRTV) held a press conference where they announced that Serhat was internally selected to represent San Marino in the Eurovision Song Contest 2019.

=== At Eurovision ===
According to Eurovision rules, all nations with the exceptions of the host country and the "Big Five" (France, Germany, Italy, Spain and the United Kingdom) are required to qualify from one of two semi-finals in order to compete for the final; the top ten countries from each semi-final progress to the final. The European Broadcasting Union (EBU) split up the competing countries into six different pots based on voting patterns from previous contests, with countries with favourable voting histories put into the same pot. On 28 January 2019, a special allocation draw was held which placed each country into one of the two semi-finals, as well as which half of the show they would perform in. San Marino was placed into the first semi-final, to be held on 14 May 2019, and was scheduled to perform in the last spot (17th) of the second half of the show. Serhat was one of the 10 qualifiers in the first semi final, making him only the second entrant from San Marino to qualify after Valentina Monetta in 2014.

== Track listing ==
Digital download
| No. | Title | Length |
|---|---|---|
| 1. | "Say Na Na Na" | 2:58 |
| 2. | "Say Na Na Na" (Wideboys Radio Edit) | 2:58 |
| 3. | "Say Na Na Na" (Rico Bernasconi Radio Edit) | 3:10 |
| 4. | "Say Na Na Na" (Kon Cept Euro Remix) | 3:33 |
| 5. | "Say Na Na Na" (Mark Voss Radio Edit) | 2:57 |
| 6. | "Say Na Na Na" (Extended Version) | 4:55 |
| 7. | "Say Na Na Na" (Wideboys Feel the Rainbow Remix) | 4:22 |
| 8. | "Say Na Na Na" (Rico Bernasconi Remix) | 5:22 |
| 9. | "Say Na Na Na" (Mark Voss Remix) | 4:48 |
| 10. | "Say Na Na Na" (Instrumental) | 2:59 |

== Covers ==
Serhat would release two versions of the song, in German and Spanish. In 2019, he would release a German version of the song called "Sing Na Na Na". In 2020, Serhat would release a Spanish version of the song, called "Di Na Na Na".
