= Katerina Moutsatsou =

Greek actress (born 1972)

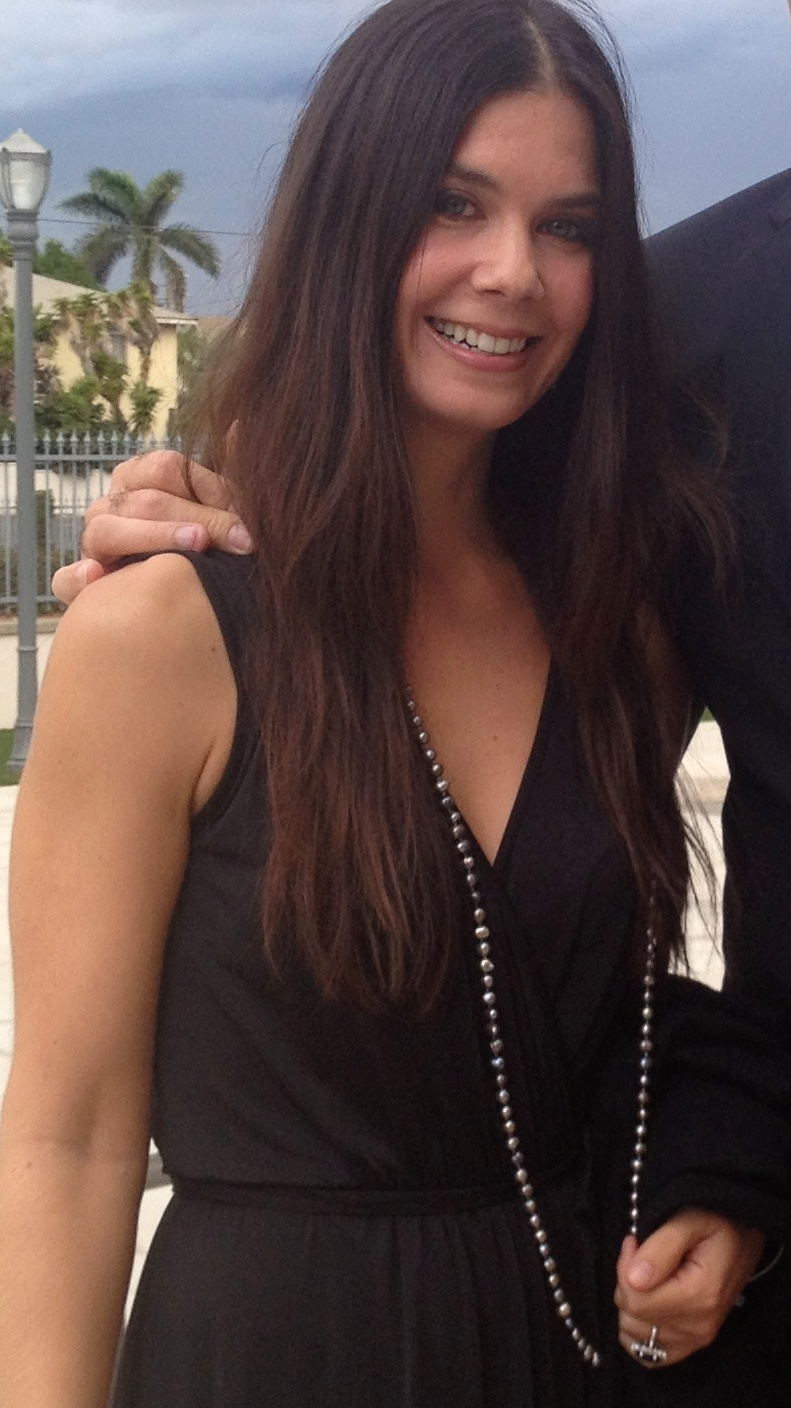
- Moutsatsou at an event outside of the St. Sophia Cathedral in Los Angeles
- Born: 21 September 1972 (age 53); Monterey, California, U.S.
- Other names: Katerina Moutsatsos, Katherine Moutsatsos
- Education: University of Paris III: Sorbonne Nouvelle
- Occupations: Actor, producer, writer, activist
- Years active: 1995–present
- Children: 2
- Website: katerinam.com

Katerina Moutsatsou or Moutsatsos (Greek: Κατερίνα Μουτσάτσου; born 21 September 1972) is a Los Angeles-based Greek actress, producer, writer, and activist. She is the author and producer of experimental films, videos, and animation series, which focus mainly on subjects related to her country of origin, Greece. She is vocal on the area of politics, and cultural identity. Her political animation series Sara and Mara Greek: Η Σάρα και η Μάρα was published by the Greek newspaper Eleftherotypia.

== Early life ==
The daughter of a Greek naval officer, Moutsatsou was born in Monterey, California while her father was on foreign duty in California at the Naval Postgraduate School, yet grew up in Athens, Greece. Her parents come from the island of Aegina. She has an older brother Konstantinos, an electronic engineer.

== Education ==
Moutsatsou attended the French section of Lycée Franco-Hellénique d'Athènes throughout elementary and secondary education obtaining a Baccalauréat. She studied History of Art and Archaeology in Paris, at the Pantheon-Sorbonne University and Theatre Studies at the University of Paris III: Sorbonne Nouvelle. She graduated from University of Paris III: Sorbonne Nouvelle, obtaining a Bachelor's degree (Licence and Maitrise) in Theatre studies, and a Master of Advanced Study D.E.A (Diplôme d'études Approfondies) in Theater studies.

Moutsatsou started training in classical ballet at the age of 6, attending the Royal Academy of Dance registered teachers' program in Athens. In Paris, she trained with choreographer Mia Frye for six years. As a child, Moutsatsou discovered her passion for singing and stage in extra curricular musical theater classes at the Athens College.

== Career ==
=== Actor ===
A native speaker of French, Moutsatsou’s first acting job was a guest starring role on the fourth season of the sitcom Salut Les Musclés which aired on the French channel TF1, in 1994. In Greece, she became instantly known to the Greek public in 1996 thanks to her breakthrough comedic role in the main cast of Nico Mastorakis’s parody sitcom, Divorced with Children for Antenna TV.

Throughout the late 1990s and 2000s, Moutsatsou found her popularity on the rise at home obtaining starring recurring roles in popular Greek TV shows, for major television channels, Mega Channel, Antenna TV, and Alpha TV, as well as feature films. She played the title role in Nikos Perakis’s feature film, Liza and All the Others (“I Liza kai oloi i alloi”). Though usually cast as the ingenue or “the daughter”, she displayed a wide range of acting ability when she was cast as the mean character in Mega Channel’s mystery series, "Me Thea Sto Pelago". Besides her acting, Moutsatsou became a singing sensation when she performed the duet Mia Fora with composer and singer Dimitris Korgialas. The song became an instant hit, and she and Korgialas shared two awards, "Best Duet/Collaboration", and "Best Rock Video" in 2004 MAD Video Music Awards. Mia Fora remained in the top 30 of the Greek top charts for over 3 years, and hit the charts in other European countries as well.

In 1998, Moutsatsou traveled to Turkey to play the female lead in Biket Ilhan’s Kayıkçı (“Boatman”), the first Turkish-Greek film co-production ever made, alongside Memet Ali Alabora. In 2001, she joined Alabora once again when she replaced the female lead in the third season of the hit Turkish television drama Yılan Hikayesi (“Snake Story”), establishing herself as a popular figure for the Turkish public. In late 2004, she played a short recurring role in Show TV’s Hayat Bilgisi, and two years later joined the main cast for over 40 episodes of the third season of Yabancı Damat (Borders of Love), one of the first Turkish television drama to be exported outside of Turkey, which aired in Turkey and Greece, between 2005 and 2008.

In Los Angeles, after a bit part in Todd Phillips's smash-hit The Hangover in 2009, Moutsatsou went on to produce two short-films, Loverly (2011) which she also directed and in which she starred alongside French actor and model Andy Gillet, and 3 1/2 (2012), a dark comedy set in Paris, where she played multiple characters, speaking multiple languages.

=== Producer and writer ===
In April 2012, Moutsatsou's first uploaded video on YouTube I am Hellene, which she produced, became popular within hours of going live on YouTube, making Hellene a trending hashtag on Twitter. It was parodied all over YouTube reaching over 2 million views that week. The discussion and controversy it sparked, attracted the attention of the Greek and the international media, The video was featured in all major Greek television channels and media outlets, making it the central topic of news, morning shows, and talk shows for over two weeks.

After I am Hellene, she produced a series of experimental yet highly political videos which usually focus on Greece, the Greek crisis, and the European Union.

In 2013, she created a political animation series Sara and Mara, Η Σάρα και η Μάρα in both English and Greek, published by the newspaper Eleftherotypia.

== Personal life ==
Moutsatsou is a polyglot: she is fluent in Greek, French, English, Italian, Turkish, German. In 2012, she married American producer Charles Como in a civil ceremony in Beverly Hills, followed by a religious wedding in a Greek Orthodox Church in 2017. On January 8, 2017 Moutsatsou gave birth to their son, Hylas.

== Filmography ==
Year	Title	Role	Other notes
1999	Boatman	Evdokia Iordanidou	Film
1999	The Flower of the Lake	Eleni	Film
2000	Stream	Kaiti	Film
2003	Liza and All the Others	Liza	Film
2005	The Dark Face of the Moon	as herself	Film
2009	The Hangover	Eddie's Assistant	Film
2010	Kill the Habit	Sotiria	Film
2011	Loverly	Woman	Film, producer, writer
2012	3 1/2	Actress	Film, producer
2012	I am Hellene	Katerina	Video, director, executive producer
2012	The World is a Business	Katmouts	Video, director, executive producer
2012	Ode to Lost Joy	Actress	Film, producer, director, writer
2012	2012 an EU Odyssey	Herself	Video, director, producer, writer
2012	The Greek Crisis Explained: A Story of Endless Trolling	Voice-over	Animation, producer
2012	Patriotism and the 'Modern World'	Actress	Video, producer, writer

=== Television ===
Year	Title	Role	Other notes
1995	Horismenoi me Paidia	Ha	Sitcom (26 episodes)
1997	Cheek to Cheek	Peggy	Sitcom (32 episodes)
1998	Gia Sena (TV series)	Anna	TV series (13 episodes)
2000	Tha se do sto ploio	Mina Foka (captain's daughter)	TV series (8 episodes)
2000	Ena ki Ena	Eri	TV series (36 episodes)
2001-2002	Yilan Hikayesi	Eleni	TV series (27 episodes)
2003	Me thea sto pelago	Nana	Mystery (21 episodes)
2005	O teleftaios paradeisos	Antigone	Television series (18 episodes)
2005-	Pote den xereis	Actress	TV series (13 episodes)
2005-2007	Yabanci Damat	Stella	TV series (40 episodes)
2013-2014	Sara and Mara	Voice-over	Animation, producer, writer (22 episodes)
