= Camilla North =

Norwegian singer, songwriter and model

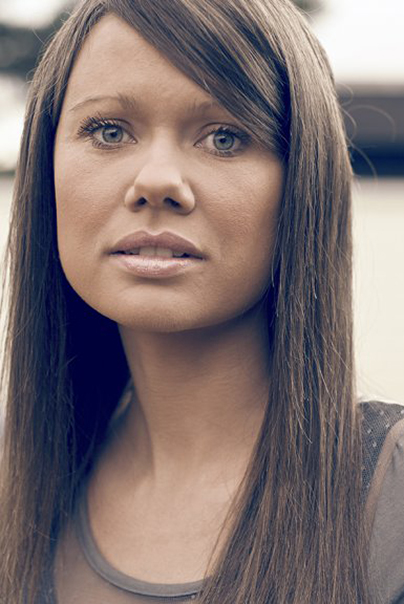
- Born: Camilla Norderud; 1984 (age 41–42); Bergen, Hordaland, Norway
- Occupations: Singer, songwriter

Camilla Norderud (born 1984), better known under her stage name Camilla North, is a Norwegian singer and songwriter. She wrote the song "Deja Vu," which is found on 4 Walls, an album by Korean girl band f(x) which reached number 1 on the World Billboard list.

She grew up in her hometown of Bergen, and she studied music at Langhaugen upper secondary school. She obtained her Bachelor Degree in music and an MA in songwriting at Bath Spa University in England.

North competed in the "English Live & Unsigned competition" and came among the top 8 out of 40,000 in her category. She won the" Battle of the Vox" in the United Kingdom in 2008, and she won the "Norwegian songwriting competition iLod" in 2009.

Her singles "Just Breathe," "Unloveable," and "Notice Me" were released in 2016. She co-wrote "Deja Vu" for the "4 Walls" album of the Korean girl band f(x), which was number 1 on the World Billboard list. Norderud attempted to represent San Marino at the 2018 Eurovision Song Contest.
