= Linda Valori =

Italian singer (born 1978)

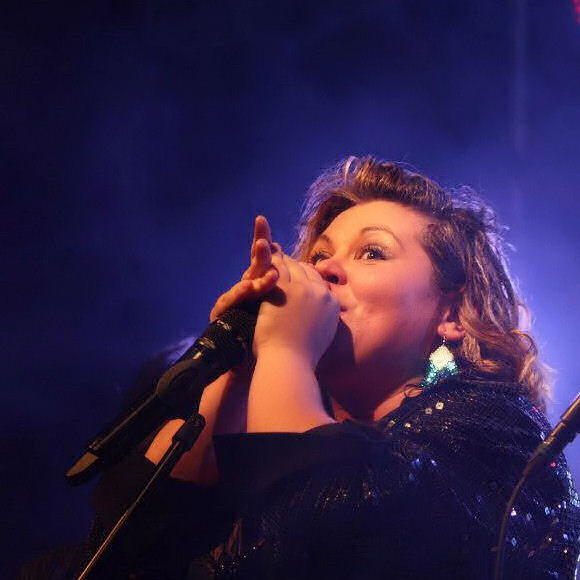
- Valori at a blues concert in Switzerland, 2013

Background information
- Born: 3 September 1978 (age 46); San Benedetto del Tronto, Ascoli Piceno, Italy
- Genres: Blues, Soul music, Jazz, Rhythm and blues, Pop music
- Occupation: solo singer
- Instrument: voice
- Years active: 1995–present
- Website: www.lindavaloriofficial.com?lang=en

Linda Valori (born 3 September 1978 in San Benedetto del Tronto, Province of Ascoli Piceno) is an Italian singer.

In 2004, she won third place at the Sanremo festival, with the song "Aria, sole, terra e mare", for which she composed the lyrics herself. She won the Golden Stag Festival's trophy in 2005.

She was born to an Italian father and Romanian mother.

== Discography ==
- La forma delle nuvole (2005)
- Tutti quelli (2010)
- Days Like This (2013)

Preceded by Eleanor Cassar	Winner of the Golden Stag Festival; 2005	Succeeded by n/a
