= Azra Akın =

Turkish actress and model, Miss World 2002

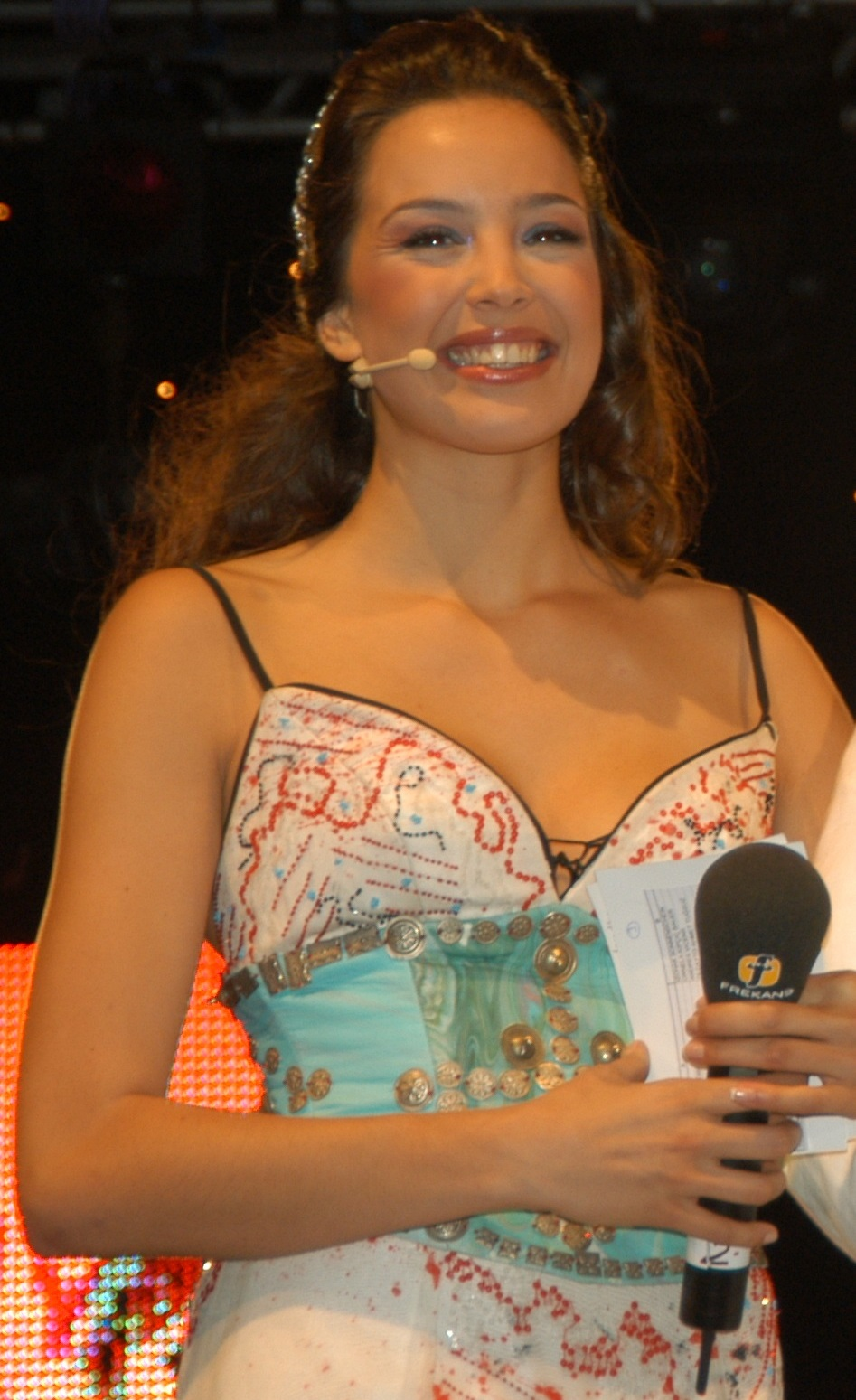
- Akın at the 2004 Megahit-International Mediterranean Song Contest
- Born: 8 December 1981 (age 44); Almelo, Netherlands
- Height: 1.76 m (5 ft 9 in)
- Spouse: Atakan Koru (m. 2017)
- Children: 2
- Beauty pageant titleholder
- Title: Miss Turkey 2002 (Winner); Miss World 2002 (Winner)
- Hair color: Brown
- Eye color: Brown

Azra Akın (born 8 December 1981) is a Turkish-Dutch actress, dancer, model and beauty queen who was crowned Miss World 2002 in London on 7 December 2002. She is best known for series Yağmur Zamanı.

== Biography ==
Akın was born in Almelo, Netherlands, to Turkish parents. Her father (Nazım) and mother (Ayda) emigrated from Turkey to the Netherlands in 1971. Akın has one younger sister named Doruk. In 1998, at the age of 17, Akın was selected Elite Model of Turkey; she then participated in the Europe Elite Model competition in Nice, France, where she reached the final 15. She continued modelling in Germany for the German catalogue Otto.

In 2002, Azra won Star TV's Miss Turkey. Thus, she represented Turkey in the Miss World beauty pageant which was held on 7 December 2002, at Alexandra Palace, London, which she also won. Akin accepted the tiara and $156,000 prize from the previous year's winner Agbani Darego. During her reign, Akın travelled to the United Kingdom, Turkey, the United States, New Zealand, Ireland, Jamaica, Australia, China and many more countries. She crowned Rosanna Davison of Ireland at the 2003 Miss World pageant held at Sanya, China on December 6, 2003 after her reign as the 2002 titleholder.

In 2003, she won a gold medal when she participated in the British reality TV sports game show The Games.

In 2004, Akın modelled for the postcards of the Eurovision Song Contest 2004 which were shown before each song.

In 2010, she won on the TV dance show Yok Boyle Dans, the Turkish version of Dancing With the Stars.

In 2017, she married Turkish male dancer and model Atakan Koru. The couple has two children.

== Filmography ==
Films
Year	Film	Role
2010	PesPese	Pelin
2006	İlk Aşk	Bahar
2005	Teberik Şanssız	Fulya
2004	Anlat İstanbul	Pamuk Prenses

Television
Year	Title	Role
2016	Miss World 2016	Judge
2015	Miss World 2015	Judge
2014	Miss World 2014	Judge
2013	Miss World 2013	Judge
2012	Muck	Elif
2009	Ayrılık	Firengiz Babayev
2009	Ah Kalbim	Herself
2008	Rüzgar	Leyla
2005	Miss World 2005	Judge
2005	Barend en Van Dorp	Herself
2004	Nationaal songfestival	Herself
2004	Yağmur Zamanı	Eylül
2003	The Games	Herself
2003	Mister World 2003	Judge

Awards and achievements
Preceded by (Nigeria) Agbani Darego	Miss World; 2002	Succeeded by (Republic of Ireland) Rosanna Davison
Preceded by Tuğçe Kazaz	Miss Turkey; 2002	Succeeded by Tuğba Karaca
