= Doina Badea =

Doina Badea

Doina Badea (6 January 1940, Craiova - 4 March 1977, Bucharest) was a Romanian singer of popular music. In 1960 she made her debut at the musical theatre in Deva where she was noted for her extraordinary voice. She had many spectacles in other countries than Romania and performed at Olympia (Paris). She was appreciated by many musicologists and had received a number of prizes. Badea died in the 1977 Vrancea earthquake. Even after many years since her death she is considered one of the most popular Romanian female singers.

== Career ==
Discovered in the early 1960s, Doina Badea became quickly an important presence in the Romanian music.
