= Eurovision: Europe Shine a Light =

Replacement programme for Eurovision 2020 after cancellation

Date and venue
- Air date: 16 May 2020
- Venue: Studio 21, Media Park; Hilversum, Netherlands

Organisation
- Organiser: European Broadcasting Union (EBU)
- Executive supervisor: Jon Ola Sand

Production
- Host broadcaster: AVROTROS; Nederlandse Omroep Stichting (NOS); Nederlandse Publieke Omroep (NPO)
- Director: Marnix Kaart
- Executive producer: Sietse Bakker
- Presenters: Chantal Janzen; Edsilia Rombley; Jan Smit; Nikkie de Jager (online host)

Eurovision: Europe Shine a Light was a live television programme, organised by the European Broadcasting Union (EBU) and produced by the Dutch broadcasters Nederlandse Publieke Omroep (NPO), Nederlandse Omroep Stichting (NOS), and AVROTROS. It replaced the Eurovision Song Contest 2020, which was planned to be held in Rotterdam, Netherlands, but was cancelled due to the COVID-19 pandemic.

The show was broadcast live from Hilversum, Netherlands on 16 May 2020 and lasted for approximately two hours. It was hosted by Chantal Janzen, Edsilia Rombley and Jan Smit, who had been chosen to present the Eurovision Song Contest 2020 before its cancellation.

The EBU reported that the show had an audience of 73 million viewers, based on data provided by 38 of the 45 countries that broadcast the programme. In April 2021, the show was nominated for a Rockie Award in the category Comedy & Variety.

== Background ==
As the Eurovision Song Contest 2020 could not take place due to the outbreak of COVID-19 in Europe, the EBU decided to organise Eurovision: Europe Shine a Light as an alternative programme to fill the space that was initially planned for the competition. The programme's name was inspired by the song "Love Shine a Light" by Katrina and the Waves, which won the Eurovision Song Contest 1997.

This was the fourth time that the EBU organised a special show in the Eurovision format, after the shows for the 25th, 50th and 60th anniversaries. Like the 25th and 60th anniversary shows, this was a non-competitive show.

== Format ==
During the programme, all 41 songs that had been chosen to take part in the Eurovision Song Contest 2020 were honoured in a non-competitive format. Participants from previous editions of the contest were invited to make an appearance. Johnny Logan, the hosts, and Eurovision fans who uploaded clips for the occasion, sang Logan's "What's Another Year", which won the contest for Ireland in 1980. Closing the show, all artists (except Hooverphonic, representing Belgium) performed "Love Shine a Light", the winning song for the United Kingdom in 1997, from their respective home countries. The show ended with the announcement that Rotterdam would remain as the host city for the Eurovision Song Contest 2021.

=== Location ===
On 1 April 2020, Hilversum was confirmed as the host city for the event, with Studio 21 in the city's Media Park as the venue of the show. It was the second time Hilversum had hosted a Eurovision event, having previously hosted the Eurovision Song Contest 1958.

=== Presenters ===
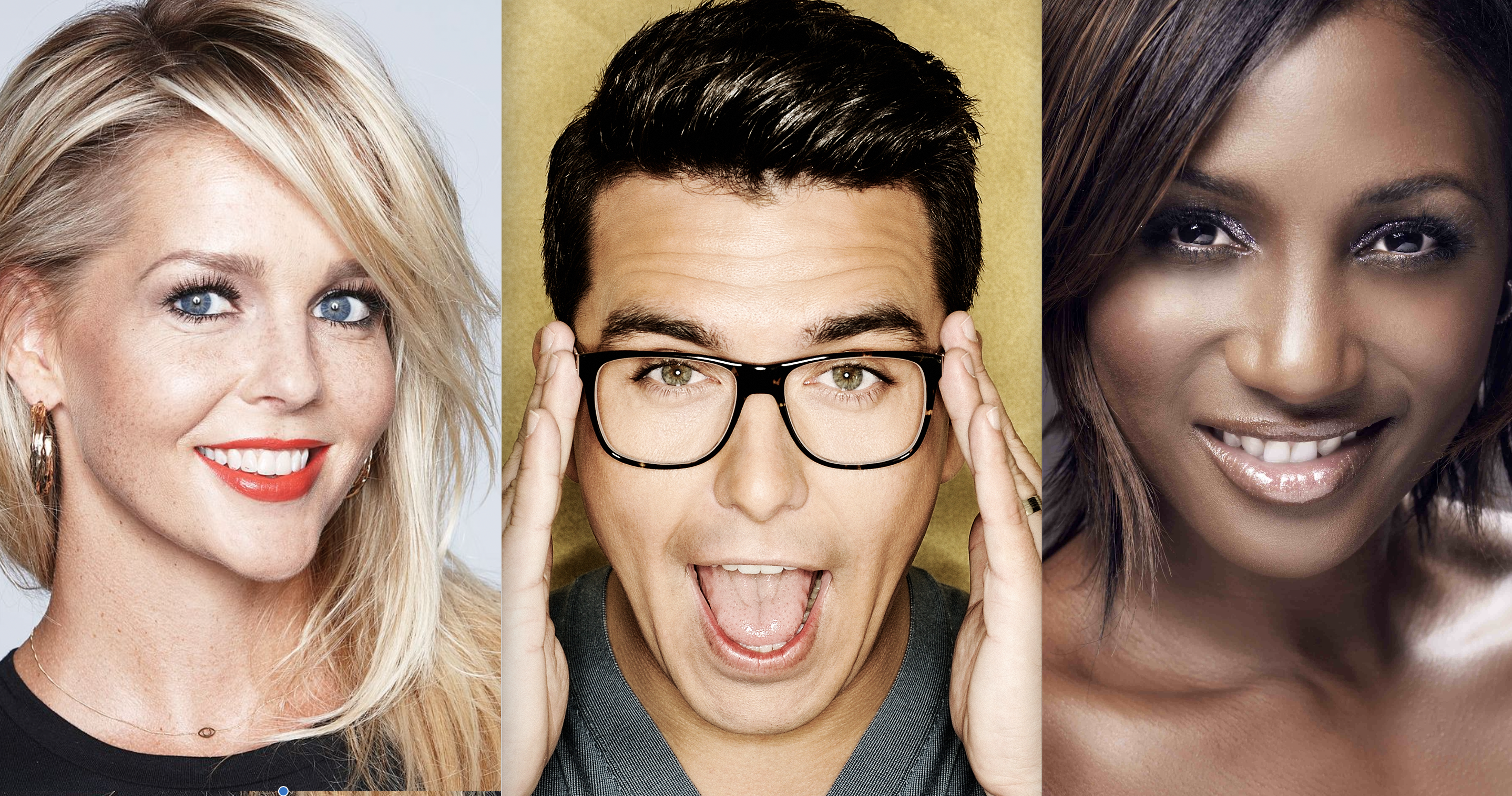
Chantal Janzen, Jan Smit and Edsilia Rombley, the presenters of the programme

The show was hosted by three presenters: actress and television host Chantal Janzen, singer and Dutch television commentator for the contest Jan Smit, and singer Edsilia Rombley, who represented the Netherlands in 1998 and in 2007. They would have been the three hosts of the Eurovision Song Contest 2020. Beauty vlogger Nikkie de Jager, also known as NikkieTutorials, presented the show's online content. All four went on to host the full contest in 2021.

== Contents ==
=== Performances ===
The show featured performances from the following Eurovision artists:

Order	Country	Artist	Song	Language(s)	Location
1	Ireland	Johnny Logan	"What's Another Year"	English	Dublin
1	Netherlands	Chantal Janzen, Edsilia Rombley and Jan Smit	"What's Another Year"	English	Studio 21, Hilversum
1	Various countries	Eurovision Song Contest fans	"What's Another Year"	English	Various locations
2	Sweden	Måns Zelmerlöw	"Heroes"	English	London
3	Israel	Gali Atari (of Milk and Honey)	"Hallelujah"	Hebrew, English, Dutch	Jerusalem
3	Netherlands	Finalists of Junior Songfestival 2018 and 2019 (Note: Mannes Bakker, 6Times, Remix, Max & Anne, Moves, Kiya van Rossum, Matheu Hinzen and Anna Grigorian.)	"Hallelujah"	Hebrew, English, Dutch	Unknown
4	Italy	Diodato	"Nel blu, dipinto di blu"	Italian	Milan
5	Serbia	Marija Šerifović	"Molitva"	Serbian	Belgrade
6	Netherlands	Rotterdam Philharmonic Orchestra	"Love Shine a Light"	None (instrumental)	Various locations (Europe Shine a Landmark)
7	Germany	Michael Schulte	"Ein bißchen Frieden"	German	Peace Palace, The Hague
7	Netherlands	Ilse DeLange (of The Common Linnets)	"Ein bißchen Frieden"	German	Peace Palace, The Hague
8	Israel	Netta	"Cuckoo"	English	Tel Aviv
9	Netherlands	Duncan Laurence	"Someone Else"	English	Studio 21, Hilversum
10	All participating countries (Note: Except Belgium.)	Artists of Eurovision 2020	"Love Shine a Light"	English	Various locations
10	United Kingdom	Katrina Leskanich (of Katrina and the Waves)	"Love Shine a Light"	English	Various locations

=== Song Celebration ===
The show also showcased the artists and songs that would have competed at the Eurovision Song Contest 2020, by showing short excerpts of the songs' music videos or stage performances, along with video messages from the artists themselves. These were as follows:

Order	Country	Artist	Song	Language(s)
First segment
1	Israel	Eden Alene	"Feker Libi" (ፍቅር ልቤ)	English, Amharic (Note: Contains phrases in Hebrew and Arabic.)
2	Norway	Ulrikke	"Attention"	English
3	Russia	Little Big	"Uno"	English, Spanish
4	Georgia	Tornike Kipiani	"Take Me as I Am"	English (Note: Contains phrases in Italian, Spanish, German and French.)
5	France	Tom Leeb	"Mon alliée (The Best in Me)"	French, English
6	Azerbaijan	Efendi	"Cleopatra"	English (Note: Contains the Japanese mantra "Namu Myōhō Renge Kyō".)
7	Portugal	Elisa	"Medo de sentir"	Portuguese
8	Lithuania	The Roop	"On Fire"	English
9	Sweden	The Mamas	"Move"	English
Second segment
10	Latvia	Samanta Tīna	"Still Breathing"	English
11	Belgium	Hooverphonic	"Release Me"	English
12	United Kingdom	James Newman	"My Last Breath"	English
13	Belarus	VAL	"Da vidna" (Да відна)	Belarusian
14	Finland	Aksel	"Looking Back"	English
15	North Macedonia	Vasil	"You"	English
16	Switzerland	Gjon's Tears	"Répondez-moi"	French
17	Serbia	Hurricane	"Hasta la vista"	Serbian (Note: Contains one repeated phrase in Spanish and two words in English.)
Third segment
18	Spain	Blas Cantó	"Universo"	Spanish
19	Albania	Arilena Ara	"Fall from the Sky"	English
20	Ireland	Lesley Roy	"Story of My Life"	English
21	Slovenia	Ana Soklič	"Voda"	Slovene
22	Austria	Vincent Bueno	"Alive"	English
23	Bulgaria	Victoria	"Tears Getting Sober"	English
24	San Marino	Senhit	"Freaky!"	English
25	Iceland	Daði og Gagnamagnið	"Think About Things"	English
Fourth segment
26	Greece	Stefania	"Supergirl"	English
27	Czech Republic	Benny Cristo	"Kemama"	English
28	Poland	Alicja	"Empires"	English
29	Moldova	Natalia Gordienko	"Prison"	English
30	Cyprus	Sandro	"Running"	English
31	Romania	Roxen	"Alcohol You"	English
32	Croatia	Damir Kedžo	"Divlji vjetre"	Croatian
33	Germany	Ben Dolic	"Violent Thing"	English
Fifth segment
34	Malta	Destiny	"All of My Love"	English
35	Estonia	Uku Suviste	"What Love Is"	English
36	Australia	Montaigne	"Don't Break Me"	English
37	Ukraine	Go_A	"Solovey" (Соловей)	Ukrainian
38	Denmark	Ben & Tan	"Yes"	English
39	Italy	Diodato	"Fai rumore"	Italian
40	Armenia	Athena Manoukian	"Chains on You"	English
41	Netherlands	Jeangu Macrooy	"Grow"	English

=== Appearances ===
- Poland – Viki Gabor
- Norway – Alexander Rybak
- Netherlands – Lenny Kuhr
- Belgium – Sandra Kim
- Luxembourg – Anne-Marie David
- Ireland – Niamh Kavanagh
- Netherlands – Getty Kaspers
- Azerbaijan – Ell and Nikki
- Russia – Sergey Lazarev
- Ireland – Dana
- Greece – Helena Paparizou
- Sweden – Carola
- Austria – Conchita Wurst
- Sweden – Björn Ulvaeus
- United Kingdom – Graham Norton

=== Landmarks ===
Various landmarks in countries that were set to compete were illuminated as part of a segment titled Europe Shine a Landmark. The following landmarks were featured in the programme:

Order	Country	Landmark	City
1	Ukraine	Kyiv TV Center	Kyiv
2	Greece	Acropolis	Athens
3	Bulgaria	Ivan Vazov National Theatre	Sofia
4	Ireland	Rock of Cashel	Cashel
5	Denmark	The Little Mermaid	Copenhagen
6	Portugal	Belém Tower	Lisbon
7	North Macedonia	Archaeological Museum of North Macedonia	Skopje
8	Azerbaijan	Baku Crystal Hall (venue of the 2012 contest)	Baku
9	Australia	Sydney Opera House	Sydney
10	Lithuania	Lithuanian National Opera and Ballet Theatre	Vilnius
11	Iceland	Harpa	Reykjavík
12	Italy	Piazza del Campidoglio	Rome
13	Belgium	Atomium	Brussels
14	Norway	Oslo Opera House	Oslo
15	Albania	Skanderbeg Monument	Tirana
16	Malta	Esplora Interactive Science Centre	Kalkara
17	Serbia	Stari dvor	Belgrade
18	Latvia	National Library of Latvia	Riga
19	United Kingdom	London Eye	London
20	Cyprus	Presidential Palace	Nicosia
21	Spain	Teatro Real (venue of the 1969 contest)	Madrid
22	Croatia	Croatian National Theatre	Zagreb
23	Austria	Wiener Riesenrad	Vienna
24	San Marino	Statua della Libertà and Palazzo Pubblico	San Marino
25	France	Eiffel Tower	Paris
26	Russia	Spasskaya Tower and Saint Basil's Cathedral	Moscow
27	Sweden	Globen (venue of the 2000 and 2016 contests)	Stockholm
28	Poland	Royal Castle in Warsaw	Warsaw
29	Slovenia	Ljubljana Castle	Ljubljana
30	Israel	Tower of David	Jerusalem
31	Switzerland	Matterhorn	Zermatt
32	Romania	Piața Unirii	Bucharest
33	Armenia	Yerevan TV Tower	Yerevan
34	Germany	Elbphilharmonie	Hamburg
35	Belarus	National Library of Belarus	Minsk
36	Estonia	Tallinn Song Festival Grounds	Tallinn
37	Georgia	Bridge of Peace	Tbilisi
38	Netherlands	Erasmusbrug	Rotterdam

The Czech Republic, Finland, and Moldova were the only countries that did not have a landmark featured.

== Broadcasters and commentators ==
The show took place on 16 May 2020 at 21:00 CEST. It was broadcast live in the following countries:

Broadcasters and commentators in participating countries
Country	Broadcaster	Channel(s)	Commentator(s)	Ref.
Albania	RTSH	RTSH 1, RTSH Muzikë	Andri Xhahu	
Armenia	AMPTV (1TV)		David Tserunyan and Emma Hakobyan	
Australia	SBS	SBS (Note: The show was broadcast on a deferred basis, on 17 May 2020 at 20:30 AEST.)	Joel Creasey and Myf Warhurst	
Austria	ORF	ORF 1	Andi Knoll	
Azerbaijan	İctimai Television (İTV)		Murad Arif	
Belarus	BTRC	Belarus 1, Belarus 24	Evgeny Perlin	
Belgium	RTBF	La Une	Jean-Louis Lahaye and Maureen Louys	
Belgium	VRT	Eén	Peter Van de Veire	
Bulgaria	BNT	BNT 1, BNT 4	Elena Rosberg and Petko Kralev	
Croatia	HRT	HRT 1	Duško Čurlić	
Cyprus	CyBC	RIK 1, RIK Sat	Andreas Iakovidis	
Czech Republic	ČT	ČT art	Jan Maxián	
Denmark	DR	DR1	Ole Tøpholm	
Estonia (Note: ERR broadcast the programme under the name Eurovisioon 2020. Särav muusika! ("Eurovision 2020. Brilliant music!").)	ERR	ETV	Marko Reikop	
Estonia	ERR	ETV+	Yuliya Kalenda and Aleksandr Khobotov	
Finland	Yle	Yle TV2	Finnish: Mikko Silvennoinen and Krista Siegfrids; Swedish: Eva Frantz and Johan Lindroos	
France	France Télévisions	France 2	Stéphane Bern	
Georgia	GPB	1TV	Demetre Ergemlidze	
Germany	ARD/NDR	Das Erste (Note: The show was broadcast with a one-hour delay, starting at 22:00 CEST, due to an overlap with the broadcast of Eurovision 2020 – das deutsche Finale.)	Michael Schulte and Peter Urban	
Greece	ERT	ERT1	Maria Kozakou	
Iceland	RÚV	RÚV 1	Felix Bergsson	
Ireland	RTÉ	RTÉ One	Marty Whelan	
Israel	IPBC (Kan)	Kan 11	No commentary	
Italy (Note: RAI broadcast the programme under the name Europe Shine a Light – Accendiamo la musica ("Let's turn the music on").)	RAI	Rai 1 (adapted and delayed)	Flavio Insinna and Federico Russo	
Italy	RAI	Rai 4, Rai Radio 2 (live)	Gino Castaldo and Ema Stokholma	
Latvia	LTV	LTV1	Toms Grēviņš	
Lithuania	LRT	LRT televizija	Ramūnas Zilnys	
Malta	PBS	TVM	No commentary	
Moldova	TRM	Moldova 1	Daniela Crudu	
Netherlands	AVROTROS	NPO 1	Cornald Maas	
North Macedonia	MRT	MRT 1	Aleksandra Jovanovska	
Norway	NRK	NRK1	No commentary	
Poland (Note: TVP broadcast the programme under the name Światło dla Europy ("A light for Europe").)	TVP	TVP1, TVP Polonia	Artur Orzech	
Portugal	RTP	RTP1, RTP Internacional	Nuno Galopim	
Romania	TVR	TVR1, TVRi	Bogdan Stănescu	
Russia	Channel One (C1R)		Yuriy Aksyuta and Yana Churikova	
San Marino (Note: SMRTV simulcast Rai 1's coverage of the programme.)	SMRTV	San Marino RTV	Flavio Insinna and Federico Russo	
Serbia	RTS	RTS1, RTS Svet	Duška Vučinić	
Slovenia	RTVSLO	TV Slovenija 1	Andrej Hofer	
Spain (Note: RTVE broadcast the programme under the name Europa enciende una luz ("Europe shine a light").)	RTVE	La 1, TVE Internacional	Tony Aguilar, Eva Mora and Víctor Escudero	
Sweden	SVT	SVT1	No commentary	
Switzerland	SRG SSR	SRF 1	Sven Epiney	
Switzerland	SRG SSR	RTS 1	Yoann Provenzano and Jean-Marc Richard	
Switzerland	SRG SSR	RSI La 2	Clarissa Tami and Sebalter	
Ukraine	STB		Timur Miroshnychenko	
Ukraine	UA:PBC	UA:First	Timur Miroshnychenko	
Ukraine	UA:PBC	UA:Radio Promin	Oleksandra Franko and Les Myrnyi	
United Kingdom	BBC	BBC One	Graham Norton	

Broadcasters and commentators in non-participating countries and territories
Country	Broadcaster	Channel(s)	Commentator(s)	Ref.
Bosnia and Herzegovina	BHRT	BHT 1, BH Radio 1	Maja Čengić Miralem	
Kazakhstan	Khabar Agency	Khabar TV	Nursultan Qurman and Mahabbat Esen	
Kosovo	RTK	Unknown		
Montenegro	RTCG	TVCG 1, Radio 98	Unknown	

== See also ==
- Eurovision Song Contest 2020
- Der kleine Song Contest
- Sveriges 12:a
- Eurovision 2020 – das deutsche Finale
- Free European Song Contest
