= Sveriges 12:a =

Swedish television programme

Dates and venue
- Semi-final: 9 May 2020
- Final: 14 May 2020
- Venue: TV-huset; Stockholm, Sweden

Production
- Broadcaster: Sveriges Television (SVT)
- Executive producer: Christer Björkman; Anders G Carlsson
- Presenters: Christer Björkman; David Sundin (semi-final); Sarah Dawn Finer (final)

Participants
- Number of entries: 40

Vote
- Voting system: Semi-final: 100% televote Final: 50% jury, 50% televote
- Winning song: Iceland "Think About Things"

Sveriges 12:a (Swedish pronunciation: [ˈsvæ̌rjɛs ˈtɔ̂lːva]; "Sweden's twelve [points]") was a one-off music competition in the Eurovision Song Contest format, organised and broadcast by the Swedish broadcaster Sveriges Television (SVT). It served as a local alternative for the Eurovision Song Contest 2020, which was planned to be held in Rotterdam, Netherlands, but was cancelled due to the COVID-19 pandemic.

The competition consisted of a pre-qualifying round on 9 May 2020, hosted by Christer Björkman and David Sundin, and a final on 14 May 2020, hosted by Christer Björkman and Sarah Dawn Finer. Both shows were broadcast live on SVT1, as well as on the streaming platform SVT Play.

== Format ==
During the pre-qualifying round on 9 May 2020, short clips of all forty-one entries that would have participated in the Eurovision Song Contest 2020 were shown, including the Swedish entry "Move" by the Mamas, despite not being a part of the programme's competitive element. From the remaining forty entries, televoting determined which twenty-five songs would be heard in full during the final on 14 May 2020. Only the Swedish public was able to vote and could do so via the Melodifestivalen app. In the final, it was determined which entry would have received Sweden's twelve points, had the Eurovision Song Contest not been cancelled.

=== Presenters ===
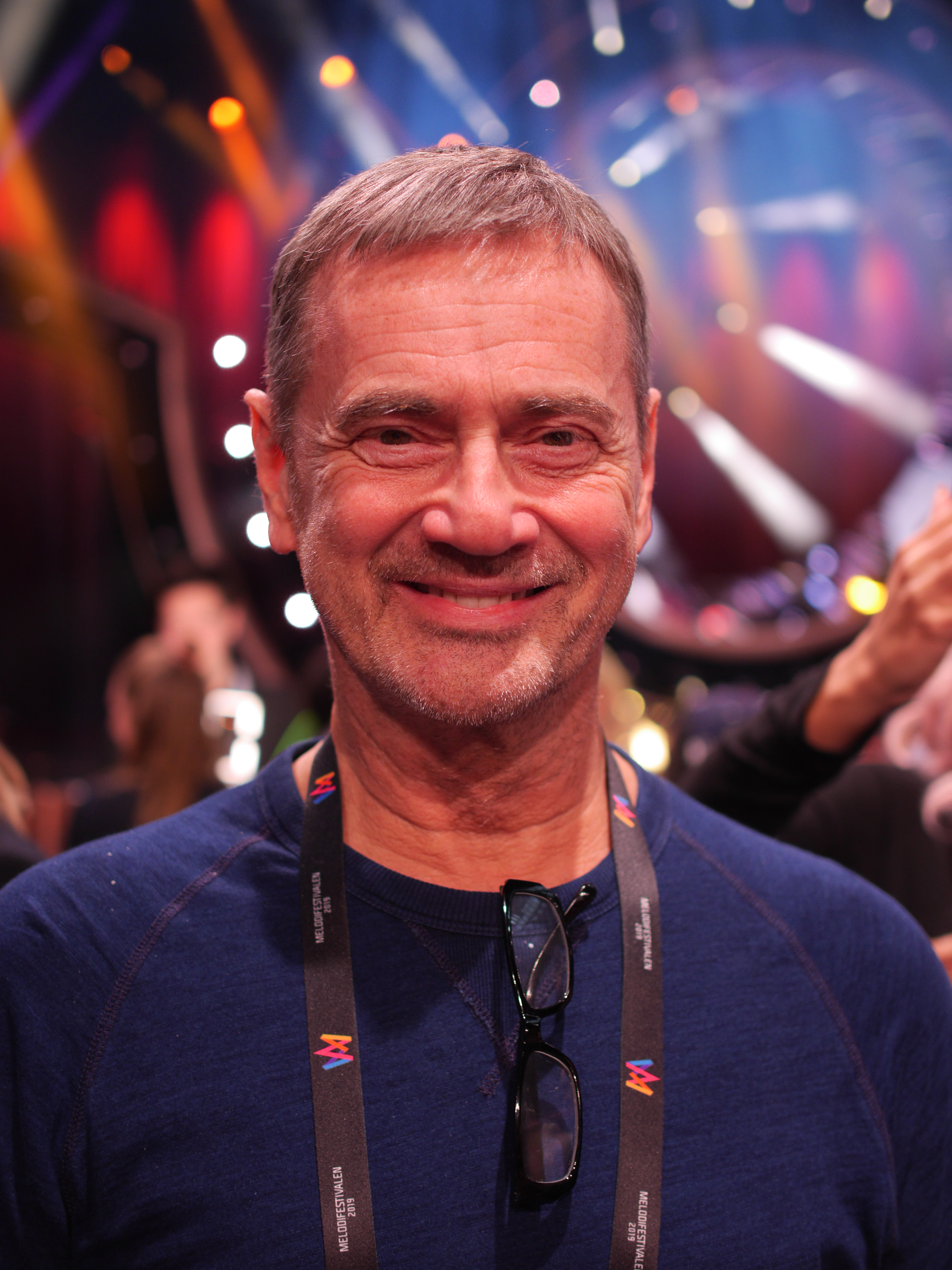
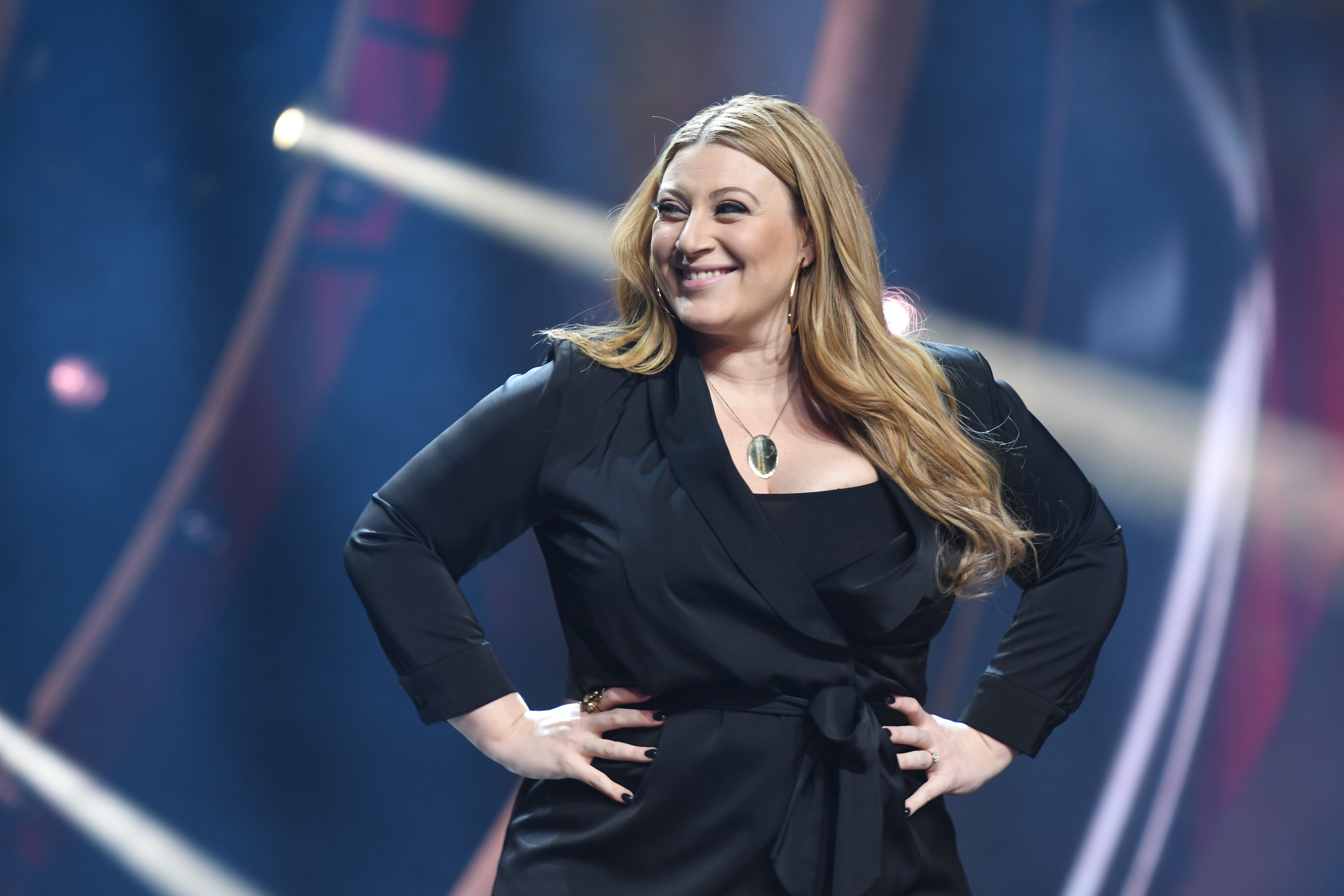
Christer Björkman and Sarah Dawn Finer, presenters of the final of Sveriges 12:a

The pre-qualifying round was hosted by two presenters: comedian David Sundin, who also co-hosted Melodifestivalen 2020, and singer and television producer Christer Björkman, who represented Sweden in 1992. The final was hosted by Björkman and singer and television presenter Sarah Dawn Finer, who also co-hosted Melodifestivalen in 2012, 2016, and 2019.

== Participants ==
=== Pre-qualifying round ===
The pre-qualifying round Inför ESC ("Ahead of the ESC") took place on 9 May 2020 at 21:00 CEST and featured short clips of the following competing entries:

R/O	Country	Artist	Song	Language(s)	Result
1	Albania	Arilena Ara	"Fall from the Sky"	English	Non-qualifier
2	Armenia	Athena Manoukian	"Chains on You"	English	Non-qualifier
3	Australia	Montaigne	"Don't Break Me"	English	Qualifier
4	Azerbaijan	Efendi	"Cleopatra"	English (Note: Contains the Japanese mantra "Namu Myōhō Renge Kyō".)	Qualifier
5	Belgium	Hooverphonic	"Release Me"	English	Qualifier
6	Bulgaria	Victoria	"Tears Getting Sober"	English	Qualifier
7	Cyprus	Sandro	"Running"	English	Non-qualifier
8	Denmark	Ben & Tan	"Yes"	English	Qualifier
9	Estonia	Uku Suviste	"What Love Is"	English	Qualifier
10	Finland	Aksel	"Looking Back"	English	Qualifier
11	France	Tom Leeb	"Mon alliée (The Best in Me)"	English, French	Qualifier
12	Georgia	Tornike Kipiani	"Take Me as I Am"	English (Note: Contains "I love you" in Italian, Spanish, French, and German, and one more word in French.)	Qualifier
13	Greece	Stefania	"Supergirl"	English	Qualifier
14	Ireland	Lesley Roy	"Story of My Life"	English	Qualifier
15	Iceland	Daði og Gagnamagnið	"Think About Things"	English	Qualifier
16	Israel	Eden Alene	"Feker libi" (ፍቅር ልቤ)	English, Amharic (Note: Also contains lyrics in Hebrew and Arabic.)	Qualifier
17	Italy	Diodato	"Fai rumore"	Italian	Qualifier
18	Croatia	Damir Kedžo	"Divlji vjetre"	Croatian	Non-qualifier
19	Latvia	Samanta Tīna	"Still Breathing"	English	Non-qualifier
20	Lithuania	The Roop	"On Fire"	English	Qualifier
21	Malta	Destiny	"All of My Love"	English	Qualifier
22	Moldova	Natalia Gordienko	"Prison"	English	Non-qualifier
23	Netherlands	Jeangu Macrooy	"Grow"	English	Qualifier
24	North Macedonia	Vasil	"You"	English	Non-qualifier
25	Norway	Ulrikke	"Attention"	English	Qualifier
26	Poland	Alicja	"Empires"	English	Qualifier
27	Portugal	Elisa	"Medo de sentir"	Portuguese	Non-qualifier
28	Romania	Roxen	"Alcohol You"	English	Non-qualifier
29	Russia	Little Big	"Uno"	English, Spanish	Qualifier
30	San Marino	Senhit	"Freaky!"	English	Non-qualifier
31	Switzerland	Gjon's Tears	"Répondez-moi"	French	Qualifier
32	Serbia	Hurricane	"Hasta la vista"	Serbian (Note: Contains one repeated phrase in Spanish and two words in English.)	Non-qualifier
33	Slovenia	Ana Soklič	"Voda"	Slovene	Non-qualifier
34	Spain	Blas Cantó	"Universo"	Spanish	Qualifier
35	United Kingdom	James Newman	"My Last Breath"	English	Qualifier
36	Czech Republic	Benny Cristo	"Kemama"	English	Non-qualifier
37	Germany	Ben Dolic	"Violent Thing"	English	Qualifier
38	Ukraine	Go_A	"Solovey" (Соловей)	Ukrainian	Non-qualifier
39	Belarus	VAL	"Da vidna" (Да відна)	Belarusian	Non-qualifier
40	Austria	Vincent Bueno	"Alive"	English	Qualifier

=== Final ===
The final took place on 14 May 2020 at 21:00 CEST and featured the twenty-five songs that qualified from the pre-qualifying round. In addition to the competing entries, the show was opened by Dotter and co-host Sarah Dawn Finer performing "Arcade", the winning song of the Eurovision Song Contest 2019, and "Bulletproof", Dotter's entry in Melodifestivalen 2020. The interval featured the Mamas performing their intended entry for Eurovision 2020, "Move". All aforementioned performers closed the show with "Let It Be", a new single by the Mamas.

R/O	Country	Artist	Song	Points			Place
R/O	Country	Artist	Song	Jury	Televote	Total	Place
1	Azerbaijan	Efendi	"Cleopatra"	0	0	0	15
2	United Kingdom	James Newman	"My Last Breath"	6	2	8	6
3	Denmark	Ben & Tan	"Yes"	0	6	6	8
4	Estonia	Uku Suviste	"What Love Is"	0	0	0	15
5	Australia	Montaigne	"Don't Break Me"	3	0	3	13
6	Lithuania	The Roop	"On Fire"	1	8	9	4
7	Netherlands	Jeangu Macrooy	"Grow"	0	0	0	15
8	Spain	Blas Cantó	"Universo"	0	0	0	15
9	Poland	Alicja	"Empires"	0	0	0	15
10	Germany	Ben Dolic	"Violent Thing"	0	4	4	11
11	Belgium	Hooverphonic	"Release Me"	4	0	4	11
12	Iceland	Daði og Gagnamagnið	"Think About Things"	12	12	24	1
13	Norway	Ulrikke	"Attention"	0	0	0	15
14	Ireland	Lesley Roy	"Story of My Life"	0	1	1	14
15	France	Tom Leeb	"Mon alliée (The Best in Me)"	0	5	5	9
16	Malta	Destiny	"All of My Love"	10	10	20	2
17	Finland	Aksel	"Looking Back"	0	0	0	15
18	Bulgaria	Victoria	"Tears Getting Sober"	8	0	8	6
19	Georgia	Tornike Kipiani	"Take Me as I Am"	0	0	0	15
20	Greece	Stefania	"Supergirl"	0	0	0	15
21	Switzerland	Gjon's Tears	"Répondez-moi"	7	3	10	3
22	Austria	Vincent Bueno	"Alive"	0	0	0	15
23	Israel	Eden Alene	"Feker libi" (ፍቅር ልቤ)	0	0	0	15
24	Italy	Diodato	"Fai rumore"	5	0	5	9
25	Russia	Little Big	"Uno"	2	7	9	4

== See also ==
- Eurovision: Europe Shine a Light
- Der kleine Song Contest
- Die Grand Prix Hitliste
- Eurovision 2020 – das deutsche Finale
- Eurovision: Come Together
- Free European Song Contest
