= Der kleine Song Contest =

TV-show by the ORF

Dates
- Semi-final 1: 14 April 2020
- Semi-final 2: 16 April 2020
- Semi-final 3: 18 April 2020
- Final: 18 April 2020

Host
- Venue: ORF Studios; Austria
- Presenter(s): Andi Knoll
- Director: Robert Reifer
- Host broadcaster: Österreichischer Rundfunk (ORF)

Participants
- Number of entries: 41

Vote
- Voting system: In the semi-finals, each juror awards 0–8, 10 or 12 points to each entry. The entry that receives most points in each semi-final proceeds to the final. The winner is determined by 100% televote of the Austrian public.
- Winning song: Iceland; "Think About Things"

Der kleine Song Contest ('The Little Song Contest') was a one-off music competition in the Eurovision Song Contest format, organised and broadcast by the Austrian broadcaster Österreichischer Rundfunk (ORF). It served as a local alternative for the Eurovision Song Contest 2020, which was planned to be held in Rotterdam, Netherlands, but was cancelled due to the COVID-19 pandemic.

The competition consisted of three semi-finals between 14 and 18 April 2020 and a final on 18 April 2020, and was hosted by Andi Knoll. All shows were broadcast on the television channel ORF 1, as well as on the streaming platform ORF-TVthek.

== Format ==
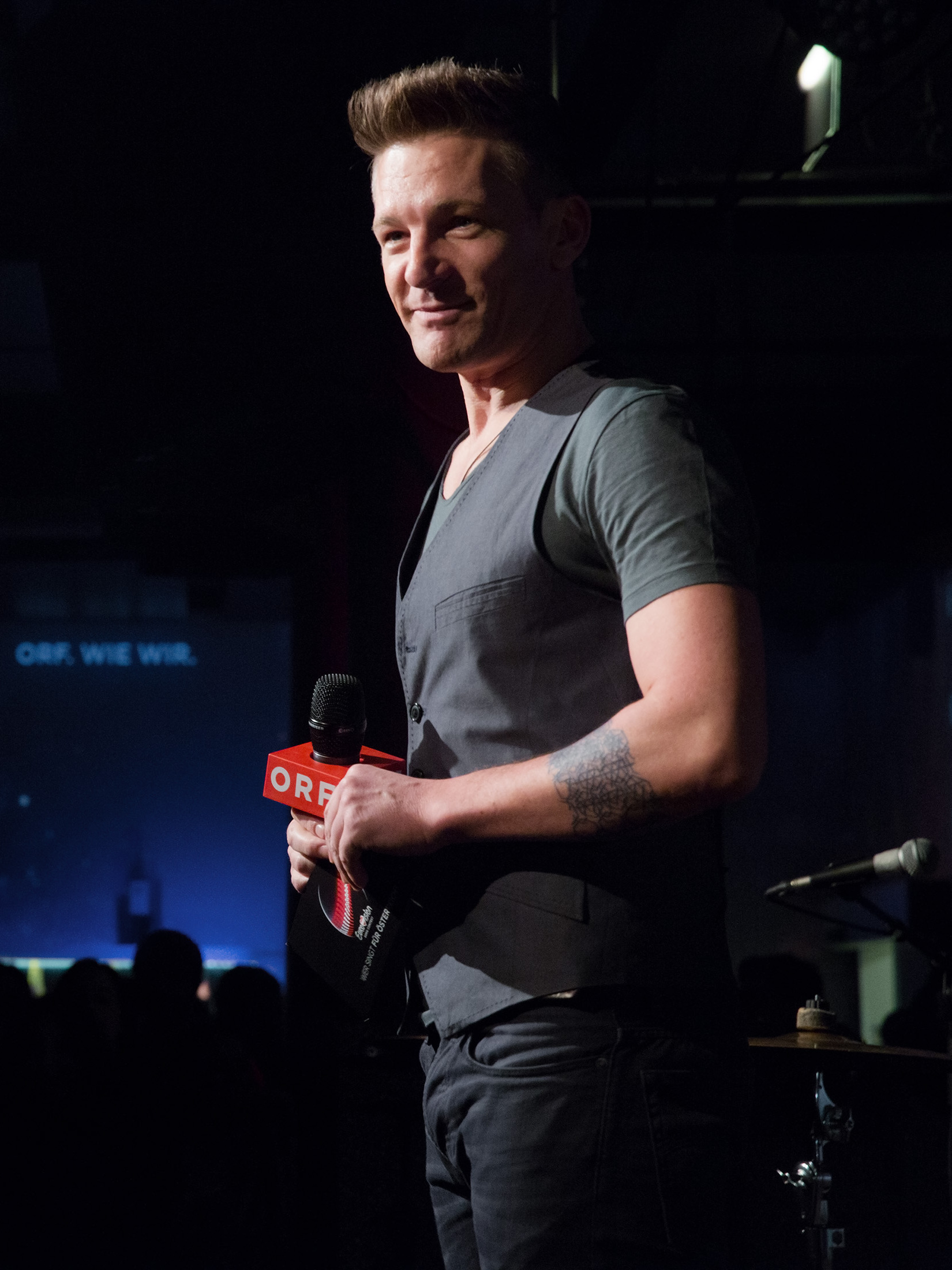
Andi Knoll, presenter of Der kleine Song Contest

In each semi-final, the music videos (or national final performances) of 13 or 14 entries that would have taken part in the Eurovision Song Contest 2020 were shown. Each member of the jury awarded 0–8, 10 or 12 points to each entry. (Note: One exception was made when Waterloo awarded 9 points to Malta by mistake.) The entry that received most points in each semi-final proceeded to the final on 18 April 2020. Out of the three finalists, the winner was determined by 100% televote of the Austrian public.

=== Presenter ===
The programme was hosted by Andi Knoll, who has been the Eurovision Song Contest commentator for ORF since 1999.

=== Jury ===
The jury consisted of 10 singers who represented Austria in past editions of the Eurovision Song Contest:

- Hans Kreuzmayr (1976, as part of Waterloo & Robinson)
- Simone Stelzer (1990)
- Petra Frey (1994)
- Manuel Ortega (2002)
- Alf Poier (2003)
- Eric Papilaya (2007)
- Nadine Beiler (2011)
- Conchita Wurst (2014)
- Zoë Straub (2016)
- Cesár Sampson (2018)

== Participants ==
=== Semi-final 1 ===
The first semi-final took place on 14 April 2020 at 20:15 CEST and featured the following competing entries:

Detailed jury votes
Draw	Song	Jurors										Total
Draw	Song	Alf Poier	Cesár Sampson	Conchita Wurst	Eric Papilaya	Manuel Ortega	Nadine Beiler	Petra Frey	Simone Stelzer	Hans Kreuzmayr	Zoë Straub	Total
1	Netherlands	4	10	10	2	6	10	5	8	8	8	71
2	Israel	8	2	8	6	6	12	1	6	3	8	60
3	United Kingdom	4	6	6	6	10	8	8	6	6	6	66
4	Armenia	5	4	5	8	4	5	3	2	0	6	42
5	Georgia	5	0	6	4	10	10	1	0	8	5	49
6	Bulgaria	6	12	10	4	10	12	1	3	1	12	71
7	Spain	4	4	8	4	8	7	3	6	5	6	55
8	Belarus	0	0	4	4	1	6	1	0	1	0	17
9	Poland	4	6	6	5	10	12	2	2	6	8	61
10	Romania	4	8	6	5	8	10	2	3	5	10	61
11	Iceland	6	10	12	2	8	12	4	5	4	12	75
12	San Marino	8	0	4	5	6	7	1	4	0	0	35
13	Belgium	8	3	6	8	8	6	1	12	1	10	63
14	Cyprus	2	2	8	10	8	7	6	2	3	2	50

R/O	Country	Artist	Song	Language(s)	Place	Points
1	Netherlands	Jeangu Macrooy	"Grow"	English	3	71
2	Israel	Eden Alene	"Feker libi" (ፍቅር ልቤ)	English, Amharic, Hebrew, Arabic	8	60
3	United Kingdom	James Newman	"My Last Breath"	English	4	66
4	Armenia	Athena Manoukian	"Chains on You"	English	12	42
5	Georgia	Tornike Kipiani	"Take Me as I Am"	English (Note: Contains "I love you" in Italian, Spanish, French, and German, and one more word in French.)	11	49
6	Bulgaria	Victoria	"Tears Getting Sober"	English	2	71
7	Spain	Blas Cantó	"Universo"	Spanish	9	55
8	Belarus	VAL	"Da vidna" (Да відна)	Belarusian	14	17
9	Poland	Alicja	"Empires"	English	6	61
10	Romania	Roxen	"Alcohol You"	English	7	61
11	Iceland	Daði og Gagnamagnið	"Think About Things"	English	1	75
12	San Marino	Senhit	"Freaky!"	English	13	35
13	Belgium	Hooverphonic	"Release Me"	English	5	63
14	Cyprus	Sandro	"Running"	English	10	50

=== Semi-final 2 ===
The second semi-final took place on 16 April 2020 at 20:15 CEST and featured the following competing entries:

Detailed jury votes
Draw	Song	Jurors										Total
Draw	Song	Alf Poier	Cesár Sampson	Conchita Wurst	Eric Papilaya	Manuel Ortega	Nadine Beiler	Petra Frey	Simone Stelzer	Hans Kreuzmayr	Zoë Straub	Total
1	Russia	10	6	12	8	6	4	2	12	3	4	67
2	France	4	2	8	4	8	7	12	12	10	2	69
3	Azerbaijan	5	1	4	2	4	10	2	4	8	10	50
4	Switzerland	4	10	10	10	8	12	3	1	0	6	64
5	Latvia	6	0	6	6	1	6	3	1	3	4	36
6	Lithuania	2	3	10	8	1	7	1	10	5	10	57
7	Croatia	8	1	6	10	5	7	2	3	2	1	45
8	Portugal	8	2	5	2	4	6	1	1	1	0	30
9	Sweden	6	8	10	6	10	12	10	8	8	8	86
10	Slovenia	6	2	6	8	8	10	2	4	2	2	50
11	Ireland	8	6	6	3	8	8	4	10	0	2	55
12	Moldova	0	1	5	3	2	8	2	3	2	2	28
13	Finland	6	5	6	6	2	10	4	6	1	10	56
14	Malta	8	10	10	8	12	12	8	10	9	10	97

R/O	Country	Artist	Song	Language(s)	Place	Points
1	Russia	Little Big	"Uno"	English, Spanish	4	67
2	France	Tom Leeb	"Mon alliée (The Best in Me)"	French, English	3	69
3	Azerbaijan	Efendi	"Cleopatra"	English (Note: Contains the Japanese mantra "Namu Myōhō Renge Kyō".)	9	50
4	Switzerland	Gjon's Tears	"Répondez-moi"	French	5	64
5	Latvia	Samanta Tīna	"Still Breathing"	English	12	36
6	Lithuania	The Roop	"On Fire"	English	6	57
7	Croatia	Damir Kedžo	"Divlji vjetre"	Croatian	11	45
8	Portugal	Elisa	"Medo de sentir"	Portuguese	13	30
9	Sweden	The Mamas	"Move"	English	2	86
10	Slovenia	Ana Soklič	"Voda"	Slovene	10	50
11	Ireland	Lesley Roy	"Story of My Life"	English	8	55
12	Moldova	Natalia Gordienko	"Prison"	English	14	28
13	Finland	Aksel	"Looking Back"	English	7	56
14	Malta	Destiny	"All of My Love"	English	1	97

=== Semi-final 3 ===
The third semi-final took place on 18 April 2020 at 20:15 CEST and featured the following competing entries:

Detailed jury votes
Draw	Song	Jurors										Total
Draw	Song	Alf Poier	Cesár Sampson	Conchita Wurst	Eric Papilaya	Manuel Ortega	Nadine Beiler	Petra Frey	Simone Stelzer	Hans Kreuzmayr	Zoë Straub	Total
1	Greece	5	5	3	6	4	8	6	8	0	6	51
2	Australia	4	3	8	5	1	8	2	0	2	2	35
3	Germany	1	8	8	8	8	7	8	6	2	10	66
4	Norway	5	2	8	5	8	8	3	12	1	10	62
5	Serbia	8	1	4	3	6	6	1	2	0	4	35
6	Italy	8	4	6	3	12	7	6	2	1	10	59
7	Czech Republic	2	12	4	8	6	6	2	0	8	3	51
8	Estonia	6	2	5	6	2	7	12	4	1	3	48
9	Austria	4	5	8	10	12	10	8	4	3	12	76
10	Albania	3	10	5	10	5	7	4	10	5	3	62
11	North Macedonia	4	2	6	3	4	8	1	5	3	6	42
12	Ukraine	10	3	10	1	0	7	1	3	2	8	45
13	Denmark	8	4	6	12	8	12	5	8	4	6	73

R/O	Country	Artist	Song	Language(s)	Place	Points
1	Greece	Stefania	"Supergirl"	English	8	51
2	Australia	Montaigne	"Don't Break Me"	English	12	35
3	Germany	Ben Dolic	"Violent Thing"	English	3	66
4	Norway	Ulrikke	"Attention"	English	4	62
5	Serbia	Hurricane	"Hasta la vista"	Serbian (Note: Contains one repeated phrase in Spanish and two words in English.)	13	35
6	Italy	Diodato	"Fai rumore"	Italian	6	59
7	Czech Republic	Benny Cristo	"Kemama"	English	7	51
8	Estonia	Uku Suviste	"What Love Is"	English	9	48
9	Austria	Vincent Bueno	"Alive"	English	1	76
10	Albania	Arilena Ara	"Shaj"	Albanian	5	62
11	North Macedonia	Vasil	"You"	English	11	42
12	Ukraine	Go A	"Solovey" (Соловей)	Ukrainian	10	45
13	Denmark	Ben & Tan	"Yes"	English	2	73

=== Final ===
The live final took place on 18 April 2020 at 21:45 CEST and featured the three songs (one from each semi-final) that received most points from the jury.

R/O	Country	Artist	Song	Place	% of votes
1	Iceland	Daði og Gagnamagnið	"Think About Things"	1	48
2	Malta	Destiny	"All of My Love"	3	19
3	Austria	Vincent Bueno	"Alive"	2	33

== See also ==
- Eurovision: Europe Shine a Light
- Die Grand Prix Hitliste
- Eurovision 2020 – das deutsche Finale
- Eurovision: Come Together
- Free European Song Contest
- Sveriges 12:a
