= Eurovision Song Contest 2020 – das deutsche Finale =

Music competition hosted in 2020

Dates and venue
- Semi-final: 9 May 2020
- Final: 16 May 2020
- Venue: Elbphilharmonie; Hamburg, Germany

Organisation
- Broadcaster: ARD (Note: Arbeitsgemeinschaft der öffentlich-rechtlichen Rundfunkanstalten der Bundesrepublik Deutschland) – Norddeutscher Rundfunk (NDR)
- Presenters: Semi-final: Dennis Wolter; Benjamin Wolter; Peter Urban; Final: Barbara Schöneberger

Participants
- Number of entries: 40

Vote
- Voting system: Combination of online voting by the German public and points awarded by a 100-member jury.
- Winning song: Lithuania "On Fire"

Eurovision Song Contest 2020 – das deutsche Finale live aus der Elbphilharmonie (English: The German final live from the Elbphilharmonie) was a one-off music competition in the Eurovision Song Contest format, organised and broadcast by the German broadcaster Norddeutscher Rundfunk (NDR) for ARD. It served as a local alternative for the Eurovision Song Contest 2020, which was planned to be held in Rotterdam, Netherlands, but was cancelled due to the COVID-19 pandemic.

The competition consisted of a pre-qualifying round on 9 May 2020 in the television show World Wide Wohnzimmer, presented by Dennis and Benjamin Wolter with the support of Peter Urban, and a final on 16 May 2020, hosted by Barbara Schöneberger. The pre-qualifying round was broadcast on the television channel One, while the final was broadcast on Das Erste. Both shows were made available for online streaming.

== Participants ==
=== Pre-qualifying round ===
The pre-qualifying round World Wide Wohnzimmer – das ESC Halbfinale 2020 took place on 9 May 2020 at 20:15 CEST and featured the following competing entries, which would have taken part in the Eurovision Song Contest 2020:

R/O	Country	Artist	Song
1	Israel	Eden Alene	"Feker libi" (ፍቅር ልቤ)
2	Moldova	Natalia Gordienko	"Prison"
3	Austria	Vincent Bueno	"Alive"
4	Slovenia	Ana Soklič	"Voda"
5	Netherlands	Jeangu Macrooy	"Grow"
6	Iceland	Daði og Gagnamagnið	"Think About Things"
7	Estonia	Uku Suviste	"What Love Is"
8	Serbia	Hurricane	"Hasta la vista"
9	Finland	Aksel	"Looking Back"
10	Greece	Stefania	"Supergirl"
11	Denmark	Ben & Tan	"Yes"
12	San Marino	Senhit	"Freaky!"
13	Poland	Alicja	"Empires"
14	Ukraine	Go A	"Solovey" (Соловей)
15	United Kingdom	James Newman	"My Last Breath"
16	Spain	Blas Cantó	"Universo"
17	Latvia	Samanta Tīna	"Still Breathing"
18	Portugal	Elisa	"Medo de sentir"
19	Belgium	Hooverphonic	"Release Me"
20	Bulgaria	Victoria	"Tears Getting Sober"
21	Lithuania	The Roop	"On Fire"
22	Belarus	VAL	"Da vidna" (Да відна)
23	Italy	Diodato	"Fai rumore"
24	Cyprus	Sandro	"Running"
25	Croatia	Damir Kedžo	"Divlji vjetre"
26	Armenia	Athena Manoukian	"Chains on You"
27	Ireland	Lesley Roy	"Story of My Life"
28	France	Tom Leeb	"Mon alliée (The Best in Me)"
29	Norway	Ulrikke	"Attention"
30	Malta	Destiny	"All of My Love"
31	Russia	Little Big	"Uno"
32	Romania	Roxen	"Alcohol You"
33	Switzerland	Gjon's Tears	"Répondez-moi"
34	Azerbaijan	Efendi	"Cleopatra"
35	Australia	Montaigne	"Don't Break Me"
36	Georgia	Tornike Kipiani	"Take Me as I Am"
37	Czech Republic	Benny Cristo	"Kemama"
38	North Macedonia	Vasil	"You"
39	Albania	Arilena Ara	"Fall from the Sky"
40	Sweden	The Mamas	"Move"

=== Final ===
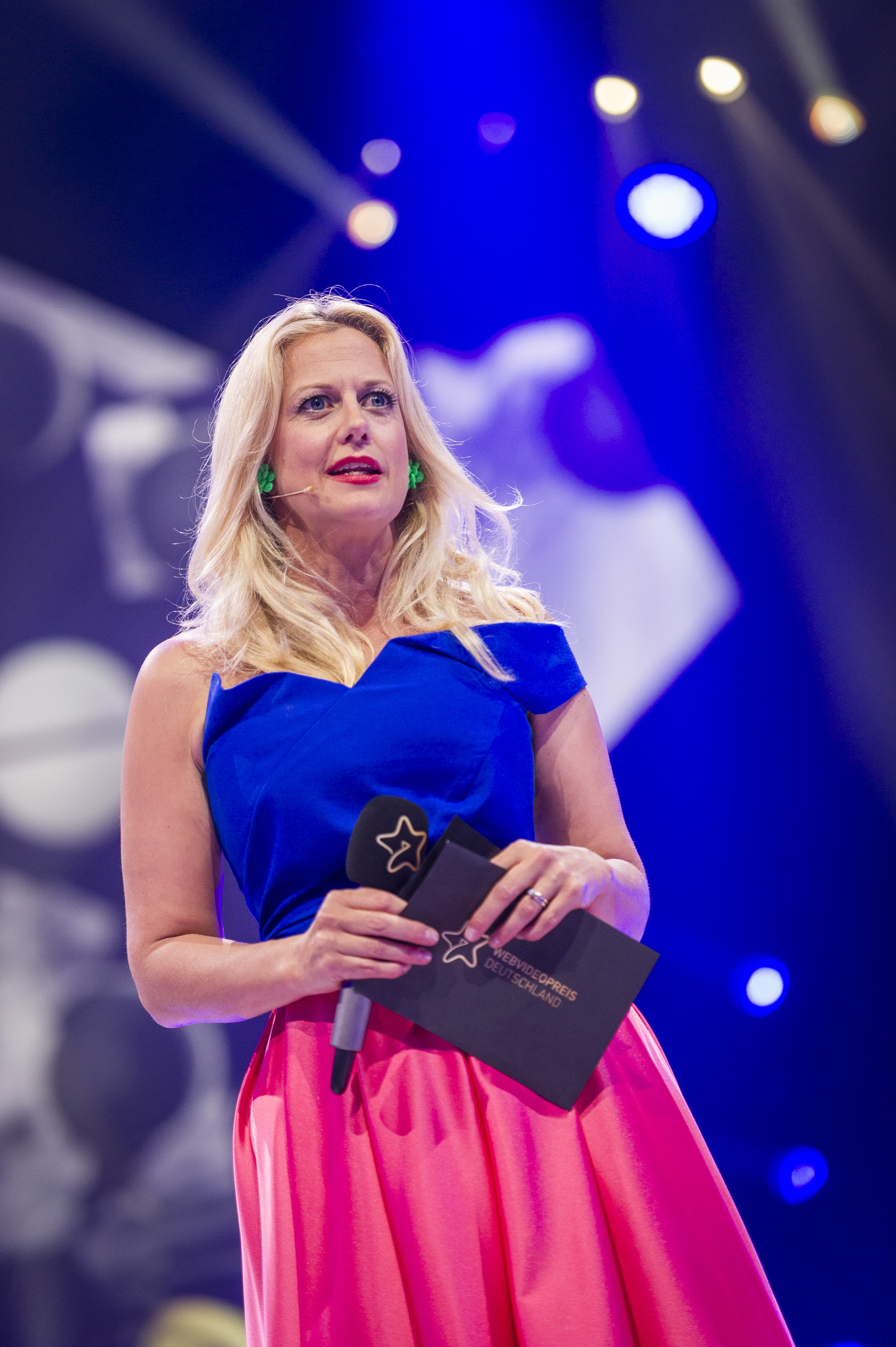
Barbara Schöneberger, presenter of the final of Eurovision 2020 – das deutsche Finale

The final took place on 16 May 2020 at 20:15 CEST and featured the following 10 entries that received most points in the pre-qualifying round: During the live show, 2018 representative Michael Schulte performed his 4th placed entry "You Let Me Walk Alone" and new single "Keep Me Up" whilst Ben Dolic, who was to represent the country in 2020, performed his entry "Violent Thing".

R/O	Country	Artist	Song	Points			Place
R/O	Country	Artist	Song	Jury	Public	Total	Place
1	Denmark	Ben & Tan	"Yes"	1	8	9	5
2	Azerbaijan	Efendi	"Cleopatra"	4	1	5	10
3	Sweden	The Mamas	"Move"	5	4	9	6
4	Lithuania	The Roop	"On Fire"	10	12	22	1
5	Switzerland	Gjon's Tears	"Répondez-moi"	6	3	9	7
6	Malta	Destiny	"All of My Love"	8	2	10	4
7	Iceland	Daði og Gagnamagnið	"Think About Things"	12	7	19	2
8	Italy	Diodato	"Fai rumore"	2	6	8	8
9	Bulgaria	Victoria	"Tears Getting Sober"	3	5	8	9
10	Russia	Little Big	"Uno"	7	10	17	3

== See also ==
- Eurovision: Europe Shine a Light
- Der kleine Song Contest
- Eurovision: Come Together
- Free European Song Contest
- Sveriges 12:a
- Die Grand Prix Hitliste
