= Eurovision Song Contest 2020 =

Cancelled international song competition

- Open Up

Dates and venue
- Semi-final 1: 12 May 2020 (cancelled)
- Semi-final 2: 14 May 2020 (cancelled)
- Final: 16 May 2020 (cancelled)
- Venue: Rotterdam Ahoy; Rotterdam, Netherlands

Organisation
- Organiser: European Broadcasting Union (EBU)
- Executive supervisor: Jon Ola Sand

Production
- Host broadcaster: AVROTROS; Nederlandse Omroep Stichting (NOS); Nederlandse Publieke Omroep (NPO)
- Directors: Marnix Kaart; Marc Pos; Daniel Jelinek
- Executive producers: Sietse Bakker; Inge van de Weerd
- Presenters: Chantal Janzen; Edsilia Rombley; Jan Smit; Nikkie de Jager (online host)

Participants
- Number of entries: 41 (planned) (Note: Announced prior to cancellation)
- Number of finalists: 26 (planned)
- Returning countries: Bulgaria; Ukraine
- Non-returning countries: Hungary; Montenegro
- Participation map: Countries that had planned to participate in 2020 and would have automatically qualified for the final Countries that had planned to participate in 2020 and would have competed in the semi-finals Countries that had participated in the past but did not plan to participate in 2020

The Eurovision Song Contest 2020 was planned to be the 65th edition of the Eurovision Song Contest. It would have consisted of two semi-finals on 12 and 14 May and a final on 16 May 2020, to be held at Rotterdam Ahoy in Rotterdam, Netherlands. It was being organised by the European Broadcasting Union (EBU) and host broadcasters Nederlandse Publieke Omroep (NPO), Nederlandse Omroep Stichting (NOS), and AVROTROS, all of which would have staged the event after AVROTROS had won the 2019 contest for the Netherlands with the song "Arcade" by Duncan Laurence. This was the first and only edition in the contest's history to be cancelled, being called off on 18 March 2020 due to the COVID-19 pandemic.

Broadcasters from forty-one countries would have participated in the contest; Bulgaria and Ukraine would have returned after their absence from the 2019 contest, while Hungary and Montenegro had confirmed their non-participation after taking part in the previous edition. All 41 competing songs and artists were confirmed by the participating broadcasters by early March 2020.

Following the cancellation, the EBU began discussions of potential carryovers for the 2021 contest, such as the host venue, the songs, and artists, with the participating broadcasters. In place of the cancelled contest, the EBU, NPO, NOS, and AVROTROS organised a non-competitive replacement show, Eurovision: Europe Shine a Light, to showcase the selected entries on 16 May, the day of the planned final. The Dutch broadcasters remained the hosts of the 2021 contest on 18, 20, and 22 May 2021 in the same venue in Rotterdam, however, the songs selected for the 2020 contest were not eligible for 2021.

== Location ==
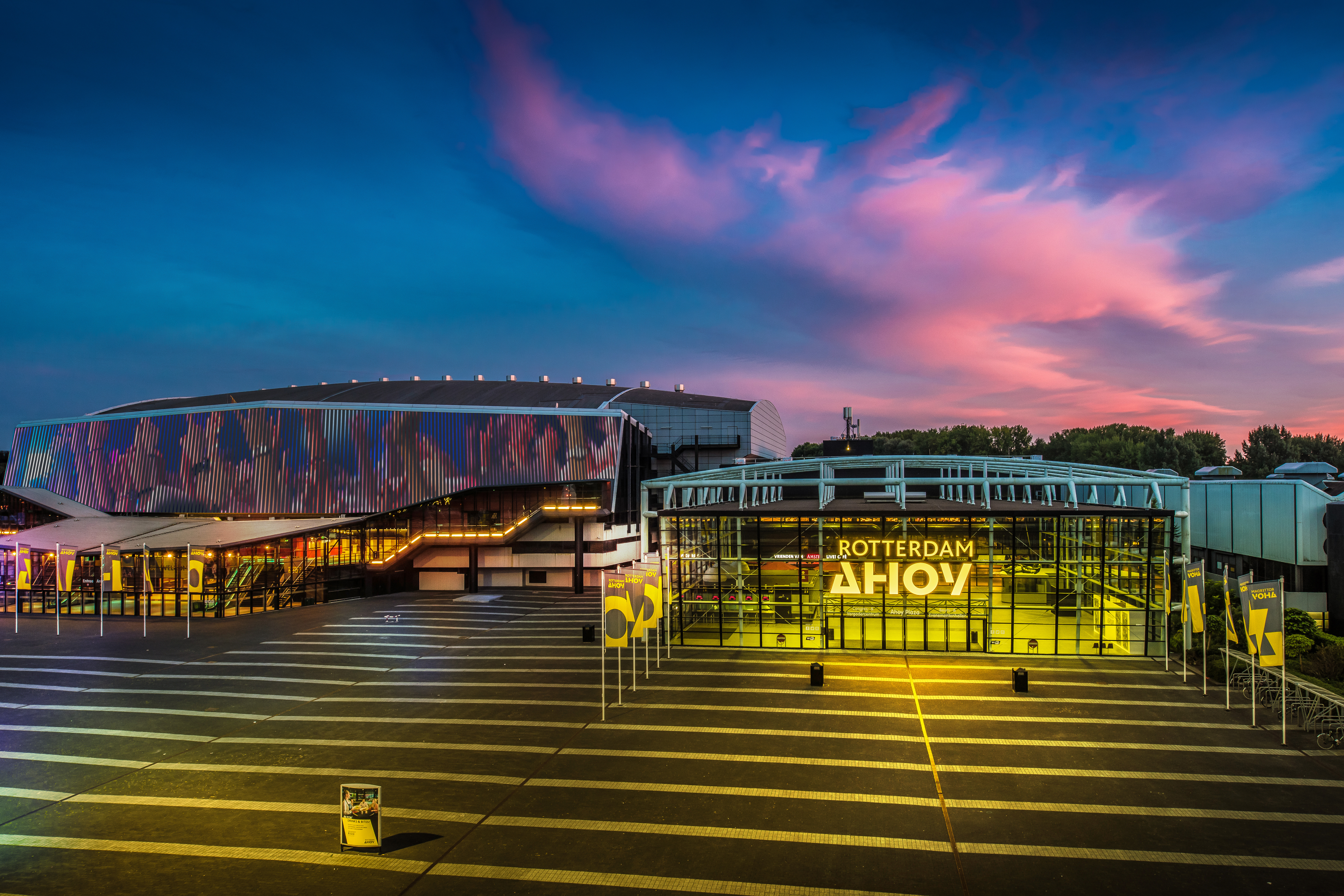
Rotterdam Ahoy – the planned host venue of the 2020 contest

The 2020 contest was to be held at Rotterdam Ahoy in Rotterdam, Netherlands, following the country's victory at the 2019 edition with the song "Arcade", performed by Duncan Laurence. It would have been the fifth time that the Netherlands had hosted the contest, having previously done so in 1958, 1970, 1976, and 1980. Rotterdam Ahoy had previously hosted the Junior Eurovision Song Contest 2007.

=== Preparations ===
Preparations for the 2020 contest began on 19 May 2019, immediately after the Netherlands won the 2019 contest. Jon Ola Sand, the executive supervisor of the contest on behalf of the European Broadcasting Union (EBU), handed AVROTROS, the Dutch participating broadcaster, a stack of documents and a USB drive with tools to begin the work needed to host the next contest, during the winner's press conference in Tel Aviv, Israel. AVROTROS was to co-organise the event with sister broadcaster Nederlandse Omroep Stichting (NOS) and their parent public broadcasting organisation, Nederlandse Publieke Omroep (NPO).

=== Bidding phase ===
Locations of the candidate cities: the chosen host city is marked in blue. The shortlisted cities are marked in green, while the eliminated cities are marked in red.

Already prior to the 2019 contest, when bookmakers expected Duncan Laurence to win, several Dutch cities, including Amsterdam, The Hague and Maastricht, announced their intent to host the music contest should the Netherlands win. A spokesperson for NPO also stated that the broadcaster had a rough plan for how they would select the host city in the event of a Dutch victory. When Laurence won the contest, mayors of various municipalities immediately began lobbying Mark Rutte, the Prime Minister of the Netherlands, through text messages. Public figures, including Laurence, Esther Hart, Getty Kaspers and André Rieu, voiced their support for their respective favourite host cities.

The hosting broadcasters launched the bidding process on 29 May 2019. In the first phase of this process, cities were to formally apply to bid. Nine cities—Amsterdam, Arnhem, Breda, 's-Hertogenbosch, The Hague, Leeuwarden, Maastricht, Rotterdam, and Utrecht—did so and received a list of criteria they and their venues needed to meet on 12 June 2019. Initially, Zwolle had also considered launching a bid to host the event but the city ultimately decided against doing so because it deemed its venue, the IJsselhallen, to have unsuitable proportions. Enschede could have been a potential host city as Enschede Airport Twente considered bidding to host the event in its eleventh hangar, however, it later learned that Enschede's municipality executive board had decided against financially supporting such a bid.

From this point on, these nine cities had until 10 July 2019 to compile their bid books to demonstrate their capabilities to host the contest. Further cities were still able to join in on the bidding race by applying prior to the deadline. During this period, four cities withdrew. Amsterdam could not host the contest because it was preoccupied with hosting other events during the contest's time frame. Breda dropped out due to financial concerns. Leeuwarden ceased bidding due to the insufficient height of the ceiling of its WTC Expo. The Hague dropped its bid because both of its potential venues were unsuitable for the event. The local Cars Jeans Stadion football stadium would have been large enough but lacked a roof, and installing such a roof would have made the bid financially unviable. Its other option would have been spanning a tent over the Malieveld field, but after reviewing the hosting conditions, this option fell out of favour. Following its withdrawal, The Hague turned to support Rotterdam's bid instead.

The five remaining cities—Arnhem, 's-Hertogenbosch, Maastricht, Rotterdam, and Utrecht—delivered their finished bid books to a ceremonial event held in Hilversum on 10 July 2019. The hosting broadcasters reviewed the bids presented and on 16 July 2019 announced that it eliminated those for Arnhem, 's-Hertogenbosch and Utrecht, shortlisting only Maastricht and Rotterdam. Utrecht was specifically eliminated because its proposal to span a tent over its Jaarbeurs offered limited possibilities for testing on location and had a questionable suitability for events like the Eurovision Song Contest, while 's-Hertogenbosch was dropped due to an insufficient ceiling height in its Brabanthallen and too few hotel rooms blocked for potential visitors of the contest.

To review and discuss the location, venue and surrounding events for the remaining bids, NPO visited Maastricht on 17 July 2019 and Rotterdam on the following day. By late July, additional visits to the two shortlisted cities were deemed necessary to review production logistics. The EBU did not pay visits to either city. Maastricht and Rotterdam were to hand in revised versions of their bid books by 9 August 2019 to add details involving the cities' social programmes, side-events and programme licensing. A "concept agreement" was put before the organisers in both Maastricht and Rotterdam in August 2019. While Rotterdam signed this agreement, the city council of Maastricht discussed and rejected it. Within the same council session, it was also clarified that the MECC would not receive additional renovations. On 30 August, Rotterdam was announced as the host city during a special broadcast on NPO 1 and NPO 2.

Key: † Host venue ‡ Shortlisted venues

City	Venue	Notes	Ref.
Arnhem	GelreDome	Joint bid with the city of Nijmegen and the Veluwe region.	
Maastricht	MECC Maastricht ‡	Candidacy was supported by the province of Limburg and surrounding cities.	
Rotterdam	Rotterdam Ahoy †	Candidacy was supported by the province of South Holland and the cities of Dordrecht and The Hague. The venue previously hosted the Junior Eurovision Song Contest 2007.	
's-Hertogenbosch	Brabanthallen	Candidacy was supported by the province of North Brabant and the cities of Breda, Eindhoven, Tilburg and Helmond.	
Utrecht	Jaarbeurs	—	

=== Other sites ===
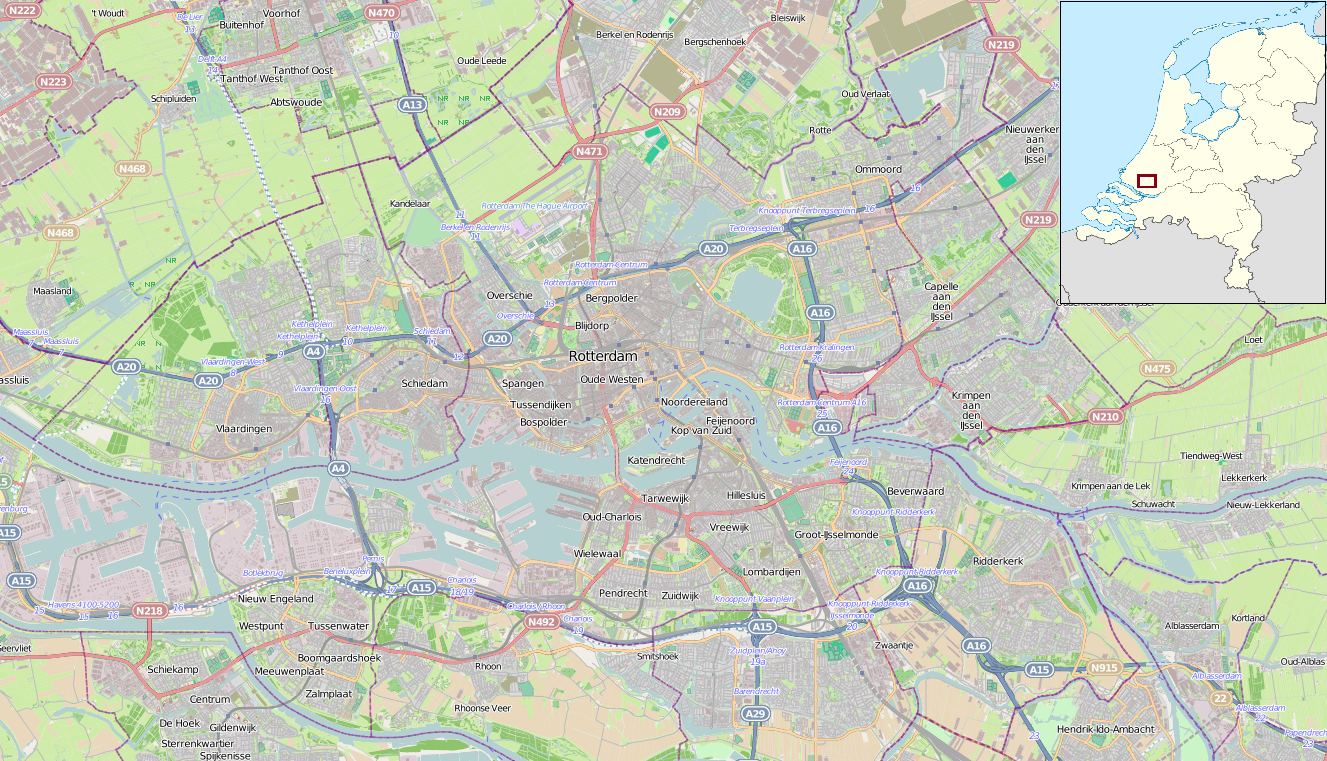
Location of host venue (red) and other contest-related sites and events (blue)

The Eurovision Village would have been erected to serve as the official Eurovision Song Contest fan and sponsors' area during the events week. There, it would have been possible to watch performances by local artists, as well as the live shows broadcast from the main venue. The Binnenrotte was the planned location for the Village. The Binnenrotte is one of the largest open spaces in the centre of Rotterdam. It is located in the heart of the city, next to some of Rotterdam's most famous architectural marvels, such as the Markthal.

The EuroClub would have been the venue for the official after-parties and private performances by contest participants. Unlike the Eurovision Village, access to the EuroClub would be restricted to accredited fans, delegates, and press. It would have been located at the Maassilo. Maassilo is located on Rotterdam's waterfront at Maashaven Zuidzijde, a 10-minute drive from Rotterdam Ahoy.

The "Golden Carpet" and Opening Ceremony events, where the contestants and their delegations present themselves in front of the accredited press and fans, would have taken place at the Rotterdam Cruise Terminal on 10 May 2020.

== Planned participants ==
Eurovision Song Contest 2020 – Participation summaries by country
- Albania; Armenia; Australia; Austria; Azerbaijan; Belarus; Belgium; Bulgaria; Croatia; Cyprus; Czech Republic; Denmark; Estonia; Finland; France; Georgia; Germany; Greece; Iceland; Ireland; Israel; Italy; Latvia; Lithuania; Malta; Moldova; Netherlands; North Macedonia; Norway; Poland; Portugal; Romania; Russia; San Marino; Serbia; Slovenia; Spain; Sweden; Switzerland; Ukraine; United Kingdom

Eligibility for potential participation in the Eurovision Song Contest requires a national broadcaster with active EBU membership capable of receiving the contest via the Eurovision network and broadcasting it live nationwide. The EBU issued an invitation of participation in the contest to all active members. In contrast to previous years, associate member Special Broadcasting Service (SBS) representing Australia did not need an invitation for the 2020 contest, as it had previously been granted permission to participate at least until 2023.

The EBU announced on 13 November 2019 that forty-one countries would participate in the contest, with Bulgaria and Ukraine returning after their absence from the 2019 contest, while Hungary and Montenegro opted not to participate, mostly due to financial reasons. Following the cancellation of the contest, the participating broadcasters were given sole discretion on whether to retain the artists who would have participated in this edition for the following year, but they were required to enter new songs in accordance with the contest's rules.

Three artists who had previously competed as lead vocalists for the same countries had been selected to compete again. Natalia Gordienko had previously represented Moldova in 2006 with Arsenium and Connect-R; Senhit had represented San Marino in 2011; and Sanja Vučić, a member of Hurricane, had previously represented Serbia in 2016 in a solo performance.

A number of other acts had previously performed as backing vocalists in other years, but had been selected as the lead artist for the 2020 contest. Ksenija Knežević, a member of Hurricane, had previously served as a backing vocalist for Montenegro in 2015; Destiny did so for Malta in 2019; Vincent Bueno for Austria in 2017; Vasil for North Macedonia in 2019; and the Mamas for Sweden in 2019. In addition, two of the lead vocalists had previously competed in the Junior Eurovision Song Contest; Destiny won the contest for Malta in 2015 and Greece's Stefania had competed for the Netherlands in 2016 as a member of the group Kisses.

Eurovision Song Contest 2020 selected participants
Country	Broadcaster	Artist	Song	Language	Songwriter(s)
Albania	RTSH	Arilena Ara	"Fall from the Sky"	English	Michael Blue; Lazar Cvetkoski; Darko Dimitrov; Sam Schummer; Robert Stevenson
Armenia	AMPTV	Athena Manoukian	"Chains on You"	English	Athena Manoukian; DJ Paco
Australia	SBS	Montaigne	"Don't Break Me"	English	Anthony Egizii; Montaigne; David Musumeci
Austria	ORF	Vincent Bueno	"Alive"	English	Artur Aigner; Vincent Bueno; Felix van Göns; David "Davey" Yang
Azerbaijan	İTV	Efendi	"Cleopatra"	English	Luuk van Beers; Sarah Lake; Alan Roy Scott
Belarus	BTRC	VAL	"Da vidna" (Да відна)	Belarusian	Valeryja Hrybusava; Mikita Najdzionaŭ; Uladzislaŭ Paškievič
Belgium	VRT	Hooverphonic	"Release Me"	English	Alex Callier; Luca Chiaravalli
Bulgaria	BNT	Victoria	"Tears Getting Sober"	English	Victoria Georgieva; Lukas Oskar Janisch; Borislav Milanov; Cornelia Wiebols
Croatia	HRT	Damir Kedžo	"Divlji vjetre"	Croatian	Ante Pecotić
Cyprus	CyBC	Sandro	"Running"	English	Alfie James Arcuri; Alessandro Heinrich Rütten; Octavian Rasinariu; Sebastian Metzner Rickards; Theofilos Pouzmpouris
Czech Republic	ČT	Benny Cristo	"Kemama"	English	Ben da Silva Cristóvão; Rudy Ray; Charles Sarpong; Osama Verse-Atile; Filip Zangi
Denmark	DR	Ben and Tan	"Yes"	English	Emil Adler Lei; Linnea Deb; Jimmy Jansson
Estonia	ERR	Uku Suviste	"What Love Is"	English	Uku Suviste; Sharon Vaughn
Finland	Yle	Aksel	"Looking Back"	English	Joonas Angeria; Connor McDonough; Riley McDonough; Toby McDonough; Whitney Phillips
France	France Télévisions	Tom Leeb	"Mon alliée (The Best in Me)"	French, English	Peter Boström; Thomas Gustafsson; Amir Haddad; Léa Ivanne; Tom Leeb; John Lundvik
Georgia	GPB	Tornike Kipiani	"Take Me as I Am"	English	Aleko Berdzenishvili; Tornike Kipiani
Germany	NDR (Note: On behalf of the German public broadcasting consortium ARD)	Ben Dolic	"Violent Thing"	English	Dag Lundberg; Connor Martin; Borislav Milanov; Peter St. James; Jimmy Thorén
Greece	ERT	Stefania	"Supergirl"	English	Arcade; Dimitris Kontopoulos; Sharon Vaughn
Iceland	RÚV	Daði og Gagnamagnið	"Think About Things"	English	Daði Freyr
Ireland	RTÉ	Lesley Roy	"Story of My Life"	English	Catt Gravitt; Robert Marvin; Lesley Roy; Tom Shapiro
Israel	IPBC	Eden Alene	"Feker Libi" (ፍቅር ልቤ)	English, Amharic	Doron Medalie; Idan Raichel
Italy	RAI	Diodato	"Fai rumore"	Italian	Antonio Diodato; Edwyn Roberts
Latvia	LTV	Samanta Tīna	"Still Breathing"	English	Aminata Savadogo; Samanta Tīna
Lithuania	LRT	The Roop	"On Fire"	English	Mantas Banišauskas; Robertas Baranauskas; Vaidotas Valiukevičius
Malta	PBS	Destiny	"All of My Love"	English	Sebastian Arman; Bernarda Brunović; Dag Lundberg; Borislav Milanov; Joacim Persson; Cesár Sampson
Moldova	TRM	Natalia Gordienko	"Prison"	English	Philipp Kirkorov; Dimitris Kontopoulos; Sharon Vaughn
Netherlands	AVROTROS	Jeangu Macrooy	"Grow"	English	Jeangu Macrooy; Pieter Perquin
North Macedonia	MRT	Vasil	"You"	English	Kalina Neskoska; Nevena Neskoska; Alice Schroeder
Norway	NRK	Ulrikke	"Attention"	English	Ulrikke Brandstorp; Christian Ingebrigtsen; Kjetil Mørland
Poland	TVP	Alicja	"Empires"	English	Laurell Barker; Maria Broberg; Dominic Buczkowski-Wojtaszek; Patryk Kumór; Fraser Mac; Reece Pullinger
Portugal	RTP	Elisa	"Medo de sentir"	Portuguese	Marta Carvalho
Romania	TVR	Roxen	"Alcohol You"	English	Ionuț Armaș; Breyan Isaac; Victor Bouroșu
Russia	C1R	Little Big	"Uno"	English, Spanish	Ilya Prusikin; Viktor Sibrinin; Denis Tsukerman
San Marino	SMRTV	Senhit	"Freaky!"	English	Nanna Bottos; Gianluigi Fazio; Henrik Steen
Serbia	RTS	Hurricane	"Hasta la vista"	Serbian	Nemanja Antonić; Kosana Stojić; Sanja Vučić
Slovenia	RTVSLO	Ana Soklič	"Voda"	Slovene	Bojan Simončič; Ana Soklič; Žiga Pirnat
Spain	RTVE	Blas Cantó	"Universo"	Spanish	Blas Cantó; Dan Hammond; Ashley Hicklin; Dangelo Ortega; Mikolaj Trybulec
Sweden	SVT	The Mamas	"Move"	English	Herman Gardarfve; Patrik Jean; Melanie Wehbe
Switzerland	SRG SSR	Gjon's Tears	"Répondez-moi"	French	Xavier Michel; Gjon Muharremaj; Alizé Oswald; Jeroen Swinnen
Ukraine	UA:PBC	Go_A	"Solovey" (Соловей)	Ukrainian	Kateryna Pavlenko; Taras Shevchenko
United Kingdom	BBC	James Newman	"My Last Breath"	English	Adam Argyle; Ed Drewett; Iain James; James Newman

=== Other countries ===
==== Active EBU members ====
Active EBU member broadcasters in Andorra, Bosnia and Herzegovina, Hungary, Monaco, Slovakia, and Turkey confirmed non-participation prior to the announcement of the participants list by the EBU. An inside source attributed Hungary's non-participation to a rise of anti-LGBTQ+ sentiment in the country; however, this was denied by the Hungarian broadcaster MTVA. Montenegro, while initially confirming its participation, later reconsidered the option due to "modest results" and financial issues, and the country did not appear on the final list of participants. Calls on Luxembourg to return to the contest after its continued non-participation since 1993 (including from Anne-Marie David, who won the contest for Luxembourg in 1973), resulted in a fan-led petition directed to the broadcaster RTL and the Chamber of Deputies, and in a second petition opened by the Chamber of Deputies itself; however, RTL also ruled out participation in the 2020 contest prior to the official announcement by the EBU.

==== Associate EBU members ====
Despite EBU associate member in Kazakhstan's previous participation in the Junior Eurovision Song Contest, Jon Ola Sand, the executive supervisor of the contest, stated that their participation in the main contest needed to be discussed by the reference group. The EBU stated in September 2019 that it had no intention to invite Kazakhstan to the 2020 contest.

==== Non-EBU members ====
Despite attempts by the Kosovan broadcaster RTK to obtain full EBU membership in order to debut at the 2020 contest, at the EBU's 82nd General Assembly in June 2019, it was decided to keep ITU membership as a requirement to join the EBU, thus making it impossible for RTK to join the EBU in time for the 2020 contest. Liechtensteiner broadcaster 1FLTV, despite previous attempts to become an EBU member, halted its plans after director Peter Kölbel's unexpected death, and did not resume them due to the lack of sufficient funds and of government support; thus it ruled out debuting in 2020.

== Production ==
The Eurovision Song Contest 2020 would have been a co-production between three related Dutch television organisations — Nederlandse Publieke Omroep (NPO), Nederlandse Omroep Stichting (NOS) and AVROTROS — of which each assumed a different role. Sietse Bakker and Inge van de Weerd would have served as executive producers, while Emilie Sickinghe and Jessica Stam would have served as deputy executive producers. In August 2019, Marnix Kaart and Marc Pos were announced as the directors of the three live shows, as well as Gerben Bakker as head of show. Cornald Maas would have been creative advisor. Jon Ola Sand, the contest's executive supervisor, would keep his role as he had done since 2011, though he planned to step down following the 2020 edition.

=== Visual design ===
The contest's slogan, "Open Up", was unveiled on 24 October 2019. The official logo and branding was unveiled on 28 November 2019. Designed by Clever°Franke, it is "an abstract representation of the flag colours of the 41 countries participating in 2020 by first appearance to the contest".

=== Presenters ===
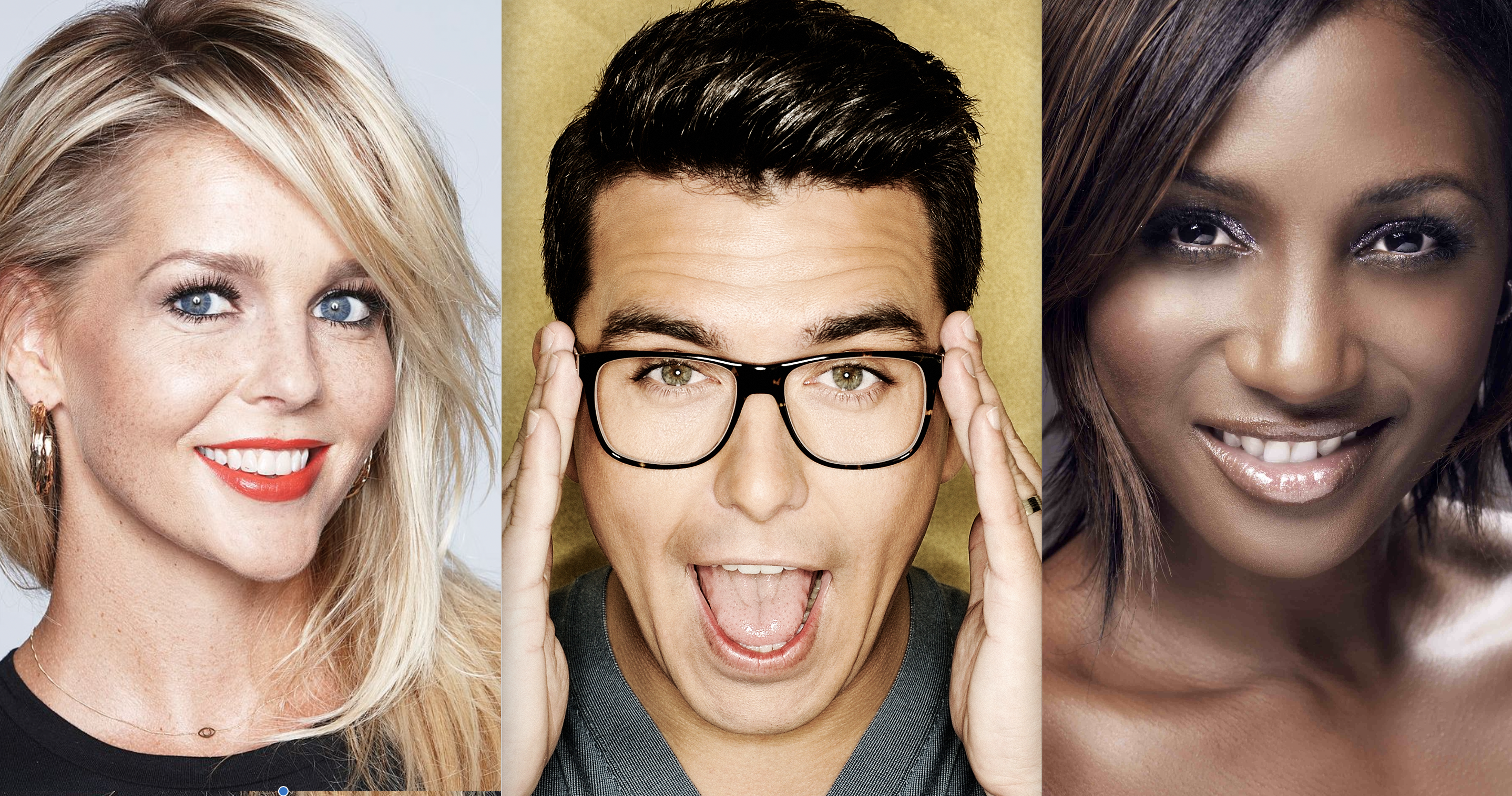
Chantal Janzen, Jan Smit and Edsilia Rombley, planned to be the presenters of the 2020 contest

The contest would have been hosted by three presenters: actress and television host Chantal Janzen, singer and commentator for the contest Jan Smit, and singer Edsilia Rombley, who represented the Netherlands in 1998 and 2007. Beauty vlogger Nikkie de Jager (NikkieTutorials) would have been the presenter of the contest's online content, including a behind-the-scenes YouTube series to be recorded with the participating artists. She would have also reported from the "Golden Carpet" during the opening ceremony and was scheduled to make an appearance in all three live shows. Roos Moggré and Andrew Makkinga would have moderated the contest's press conferences.

=== Stage design ===
The stage design for the 2020 contest was revealed on 2 December 2019. The design was inspired by the slogan "Open Up" and the typical Dutch flat landscape. The Eurovision stage was designed by German stage designer Florian Wieder, who also designed the stages for the contests in 2011–12, 2015, and 2017–19. Unlike the previous contest, the green room was placed inside the main performance venue.

=== Opening and interval acts ===
The second semi-final would have opened with a performance by breakdancer Redouan "Redo" Ait Chitt. The final would have been opened with the traditional flag parade, introducing all twenty-six finalists, accompanied by music produced by 15-year-old DJ Pieter Gabriel. A symphony orchestra of sixty-five young musicians from across the Netherlands, specifically formed for this occasion, was scheduled to perform in the final, together with DJ Afrojack and singer Glennis Grace, the latter of whom represented the Netherlands in 2005. This interval act would have also featured forty dancers and a twenty-five-piece gospel choir.

Furthermore, the final was scheduled to include performances from eight former Eurovision winners: Gigliola Cinquetti would have performed "Non ho l'età", Lenny Kuhr would have performed "De troubadour", Getty Kaspers (of Teach-In) would have performed "Ding-a-dong", Sandra Kim would have performed "J'aime la vie", Paul Harrington and Charlie McGettigan would have performed "Rock 'n' Roll Kids", Alexander Rybak would have performed "Fairytale", and Duncan Laurence would have performed "Arcade".

== Format ==
=== Voting system ===
The Spanish head of delegation revealed on 22 October 2019 that the EBU was consulting with delegations on potential changes to the voting system. The Greek Head of Delegation revealed on 30 October 2019 that the majority of delegations (80%) voted in favour of maintaining the current voting system.

=== Semi-final allocation draw ===
Results of the semi-final allocation draw Participating countries in the first semi-final Pre-qualified for the final but also voting in the first semi-final Participating countries in the second semi-final Pre-qualified for the final but also voting in the second semi-final

The draw to determine the participating countries' semi-finals took place on 28 January 2020 at 16:10 CET, at the Rotterdam City Hall. The thirty-five semi-finalists were divided over five pots, based on historical voting patterns as calculated by the contest's official televoting partner Digame. The purpose of drawing from different pots was to reduce the chance of "bloc voting" and to increase suspense in the semi-finals. The draw also determined which semi-final each of the six automatic qualifiers – host country the Netherlands and "Big Five" countries France, Germany, Italy, Spain and the United Kingdom – would broadcast and vote in. The ceremony was hosted by contest presenters Chantal Janzen, Jan Smit and Edsilia Rombley, and included the passing of the host city insignia from Tzipi Brand Frank, then-deputy mayor of previous host city Tel Aviv, to Ahmed Aboutaleb, then-mayor of Rotterdam.

Pot 1	Pot 2	Pot 3	Pot 4	Pot 5
Albania; Austria; Croatia; North Macedonia; Serbia; Slovenia; Switzerland	Australia; Denmark; Estonia; Finland; Iceland; Norway; Sweden	Armenia; Azerbaijan; Belarus; Georgia; Moldova; Russia; Ukraine	Bulgaria; Cyprus; Greece; Malta; Portugal; Romania; San Marino	Belgium; Czech Republic; Ireland; Israel; Latvia; Lithuania; Poland

=== Postcards ===
The concept of the 2020 postcards was based on the "Open Up" theme of the contest. Each artist would have visited a different part of the Netherlands and connected with locals by participating in a Dutch activity, tradition or hobby.

== Overview of planned contest ==
=== Semi-final 1 ===
The first semi-final would have taken place on 12 May 2020 at 21:00 (CEST). Seventeen countries would have participated in the first semi-final. These countries, plus Germany, Italy, and the Netherlands, would have voted in this semi-final.

Planned participants of the first semi-final (Note: The running order was determined by the producers as if the contest were held and presented in the alternative programme Eurovision Song Celebration 2020, held as a replacement of semi-finals.)
R/O	Country	Artist	Song
1	Sweden	The Mamas	"Move"
2	Belarus	VAL	"Da vidna"
3	Australia	Montaigne	"Don't Break Me"
4	North Macedonia	Vasil	"You"
5	Slovenia	Ana Soklič	"Voda"
6	Lithuania	The Roop	"On Fire"
7	Ireland	Lesley Roy	"Story of My Life"
8	Russia	Little Big	"Uno"
9	Belgium	Hooverphonic	"Release Me"
10	Malta	Destiny	"All of My Love"
11	Croatia	Damir Kedžo	"Divlji vjetre"
12	Azerbaijan	Efendi	"Cleopatra"
13	Cyprus	Sandro	"Running"
14	Norway	Ulrikke	"Attention"
15	Israel	Eden Alene	"Feker Libi"
16	Romania	Roxen	"Alcohol You"
17	Ukraine	Go_A	"Solovey"

=== Semi-final 2 ===
The second semi-final would have taken place on 14 May 2020 at 21:00 (CEST). Eighteen countries would have participated in the second semi-final. These countries, plus France, Spain, and the United Kingdom, would have voted in this semi-final.

Planned participants of the second semi-final
R/O	Country	Artist	Song
1	Greece	Stefania	"Supergirl"
2	Estonia	Uku Suviste	"What Love Is"
3	Austria	Vincent Bueno	"Alive"
4	Moldova	Natalia Gordienko	"Prison"
5	San Marino	Senhit	"Freaky!"
6	Czech Republic	Benny Cristo	"Kemama"
7	Serbia	Hurricane	"Hasta la vista"
8	Poland	Alicja	"Empires"
9	Iceland	Daði og Gagnamagnið	"Think About Things"
10	Switzerland	Gjon's Tears	"Répondez-moi"
11	Denmark	Ben and Tan	"Yes"
12	Albania	Arilena Ara	"Fall from the Sky"
13	Finland	Aksel	"Looking Back"
14	Armenia	Athena Manoukian	"Chains on You"
15	Portugal	Elisa	"Medo de sentir"
16	Georgia	Tornike Kipiani	"Take Me as I Am"
17	Bulgaria	Victoria	"Tears Getting Sober"
18	Latvia	Samanta Tīna	"Still Breathing"

=== Final ===
The final would have taken place on 16 May 2020 at 21:00 (CEST). Twenty-six countries would have participated in the final, composed of the host country, the "Big Five", and the ten best-ranked entries of each of the two semi-finals. All forty-one participating countries would have voted in the final.

Planned participants of the final
R/O	Country	Artist	Song
—N/a	France	Tom Leeb	"Mon alliée (The Best in Me)"
—N/a	Germany	Ben Dolic	"Violent Thing"
—N/a	Italy	Diodato	"Fai rumore"
—N/a	Spain	Blas Cantó	"Universo"
—N/a	United Kingdom	James Newman	"My Last Breath"
23	Netherlands	Jeangu Macrooy	"Grow"
—N/a	10 qualifiers from the first semi-final		
—N/a	10 qualifiers from the second semi-final		

== Planned broadcasts ==
Before the contest's cancellation, broadcasters had started confirming their broadcasting plans and who would provide commentary either on-location or remotely at their studios during the contest. The role of the commentators was to add insight to the participating entries and the provision of voting information.

Planned broadcasters and commentators in participating countries
Country	Broadcaster	Channel(s)	Show(s)	Commentator(s)	Ref(s)
Australia	SBS	SBS	All shows	Not announced	
Austria	ORF	ORF 1	All shows	Not announced	
Belarus	BTRC	Belarus-1, Belarus 24	All shows	Evgeny Perlin	
Finland	Yle	Yle TV1	Final	Not announced	
France	France Télévisions	France 2	Final	Not announced	
Germany	ARD/NDR	One	All shows	Peter Urban and Michael Schulte	
Germany	ARD/NDR	Das Erste, Deutsche Welle	Final	Peter Urban and Michael Schulte	
Greece	ERT	Not announced	All shows	Maria Kozakou and Giorgos Kapoutzidis	
Israel	IPBC	Kan 11	All shows	Geula Even-Sa'ar and Asaf Liberman	
Italy	RAI	Rai 4	Semi-finals	Not announced	
Italy	RAI	Rai 1, Rai Radio 2	Final	Not announced	
Norway	NRK	NRK1	All shows	Marte Stokstad	
Romania	TVR	TVR 1, TVRi	All shows	Not announced	
Switzerland	SRG SSR	SRF info	All shows	Sven Epiney	
Switzerland	SRG SSR	SRF zwei	SF2	Sven Epiney	
Switzerland	SRG SSR	SRF 1	Final	Sven Epiney	
United Kingdom	BBC	BBC Four	Semi-finals	Scott Mills and Rylan Clark-Neal	
United Kingdom	BBC	BBC One	Final	Graham Norton	
United Kingdom	BBC	BBC Radio 2	Final	Ken Bruce	

Planned broadcasters and commentators in non-participating countries
Country	Broadcaster	Channel(s)	Show(s)	Commentator(s)	Ref(s)
Canada	Rogers	Omni Television	Not announced	Not announced	
United States	Netflix		All shows	Not announced	(Note: Netflix, an over-the-top video on demand service, signed an agreement with the EBU in July 2019 that would have allowed it to distribute all three shows of the 2020 contest on its service in the United States.)

== Impact of the COVID-19 pandemic and cancellation ==
The spread of coronavirus disease 2019 (COVID-19) from Wuhan, China, to other countries around the world in late 2019 and early 2020 raised concerns and the potential impact over the organisation and staging of the contest. On 6 March, co-host broadcaster NPO stated, "Eurovision organisers would follow the advice of health authorities in deciding what form the event, due to be held on 12–16 May, would take." In March, authorities in Denmark urged the cancellation of events with more than 1,000 spectators to limit the spread of the virus. This resulted in the Danish national final being held with no live audience. Representatives from Sweden, Finland, Israel, Switzerland, Italy, and Greece attended the meeting of the heads of delegation on 9 March remotely. The contest's executive supervisor Jon Ola Sand also attended the meeting remotely, due to travel restrictions being placed on EBU staff until 13 March after an employee contracted the virus.

Several pre-parties – promotional events which are held across Europe in the lead-up to the contest – were also impacted due to the emerging pandemic. These included the PrePartyES, planned for 10–11 April in Madrid and was eventually modified to an online-only format, where artists performed at home in a YouTube concert; and three pre-parties that were cancelled: Israel Calling, a pre-party planned in Tel Aviv; Eurovision in Concert, a pre-party planned in Amsterdam; and the London Eurovision Party. The pandemic also affected pre-contest activities of several competing artists. Eden Alene, the Israeli representative, revealed that she would not travel to the Netherlands to film her postcard as a precautionary measure; the Israeli broadcaster Kan stated it would try to find another way to film her postcard. The Lithuanian representatives The Roop also cancelled both their travel plans to film their postcard and participation in the London and Amsterdam pre-parties. The Bulgarian representative Victoria also cancelled her participation in the London and Amsterdam pre-parties.

Ultimately, the contest itself was cancelled as a result of the pandemic and the uncertainty surrounding it; this decision was announced on 18 March 2020. On the same day, the EBU explained the reasons for which the alternative options that had been considered – postponement of the show, show without audience and remote competition – were discarded. Postponement was impossible because at that time it was unknown when the pandemic would finish and also because the winning country would not have enough time to organise the event the following year. The idea of staging a show without a live audience was also impracticable because, regardless of audience participation, the presence of production crews, delegations and relevant personnel was needed, which would constitute a breach of social distancing guidelines at the time. The possibility of organising a remote competition was also rejected because it would have undermined the tradition and spirit of the event, in which all contestants are given equal opportunity by performing on the same stage. By then, the Dutch government had decided to prohibit all gatherings with more than 100 attendees until further notice. The contest's reference group explored the option of letting the artists selected for 2020 compete in the following year instead, and ultimately left this decision to each participating broadcaster. A decision was made on 20 March 2020 that, in accordance with the contest's rules, which disqualify songs released publicly before 1 September of the preceding calendar year, none of the 2020 songs would be eligible to compete in the 2021 contest.

The Ahoy Arena itself, with most events and gatherings in the Netherlands prohibited until at least 1 September 2020, served as a temporary care facility to cover the nationwide shortage of hospital beds. Construction of the stage would have started on 6 April.

=== Foiled terrorism plot ===
Alexander H., a Swedish individual residing in Strassen, Luxembourg and alleged member of the neo-Nazi group The Base, was arrested on 22 February 2020 and accused of manufacturing explosives at his home and plotting terrorist attacks. On 9 July 2025, during H's trial, Luxembourgish prosecutors revealed that the defendant had planned an attack on the Eurovision Song Contest 2020, using explosives and chlorine gas, with the help of an unnamed Dutch accomplice. The plot was laid out in a document on Google Docs titled "Fun time for Eurovision 2020 – For a better and less over-accepting future". Dutch media reported that while the Public Prosecution Service and the police were aware of the plot, they did not inform NPO and the government of Rotterdam about it. H was ultimately sentenced to two years in prison and an additional six years of probation.

== Alternative programming ==
=== Eurovision: Europe Shine a Light ===
The EBU and the host broadcasters worked on a non-competitive replacement show, Eurovision: Europe Shine a Light, after the contest's cancellation. From Studio 21 at Media Park in Hilversum, the show was broadcast live on 16 May 2020, the date the contest's final was planned to take place, with Chantal Janzen, Jan Smit, and Edsilia Rombley serving as hosts. 45 countries broadcast the show, including all of the countries that would have participated.

=== Eurovision Song Celebration 2020 ===
The EBU announced on 30 April 2020 that Eurovision Song Celebration 2020 would be released as a replacement for the semi-finals on the contest's official YouTube channel. The shows, presented by Janouk Kelderman and premiered on 12 and 14 May, honoured all 41 participants and their songs in a non-competitive format. The first episode showcased the participants of the first semi-final, as well as those of host country the Netherlands and two of the "Big Five", Germany and Italy, who would also have voted in this semi-final. The second episode featured the participants of the second semi-final, as well as those of France, Spain and the United Kingdom, who would also have voted in this semi-final. The running order was determined by the producers of the show as if the contest were actually held, while fans were asked to contribute to the show by sending videoclips of their favourite entries.

=== Eurovision Home Concerts ===
The contest's official YouTube channel broadcast Eurovision Home Concerts every Friday from 3 April to 15 May 2020, featuring the planned artists for 2020 and past entrants performing their entries, as well as one of their favourite other entries from their homes. For their cover, the act gave a shortlist of two to four entries for fans to choose in a poll on Twitter or Instagram, and covered the song (or songs if there was a tie) that won the poll.

=== EurovisionAgain ===
Upon hearing about the contest's cancellation, journalist Rob Holley launched an initiative to watch a past contest on YouTube every week, eventually giving it the title EurovisionAgain. The initiative quickly became popular, so the EBU itself decided to partake. Every Saturday at 21:00 CEST, the Eurovision YouTube channel would re-broadcast a final of a previous contest, revealed by the EurovisionAgain team 15 minutes before the start. Contests prior to 2004 are available for a limited time. The initiative was generally received as a welcome distraction for fans. On Twitter, #EurovisionAgain regularly became a trending topic and received positive reactions from past participants. As part of the initiative, Holley collected over £24,700 for charity.

From 18 July 2020, a second run of EurovisionAgain began with a replay of the 1999 contest, and aired every third Saturday of the month leading up to the 2021 selection season. It ended with a special edition where the 26 most popular songs that did not qualify for the final, one from each country, as chosen via the official Eurovision social media handles, were streamed and put to a fan-vote. "Hear Them Calling" by Greta Salóme, the entry for Iceland in 2016, won the fan-vote.

=== National alternative programming ===
Aside from Europe Shine a Light, broadcasters were left to make plans to fill the rest of the gaps themselves. Most broadcasters provided their television audience with Eurovision-related replacement programming. Examples include holding an alternative contest by offering people the chance to listen to the 2020 entries and vote for their favourites, with some countries holding a ranking of (their own) songs throughout Eurovision history, and re-broadcasts of pre-existing Eurovision specials and previous contests which are significant for their country, such as the contest they last won or hosted.

Big Night In was organised and broadcast by the Australian broadcaster Special Broadcasting Service (SBS) and aired on 16 May 2020. Australians voted online for their favourite 2020 song (minus Montaigne's "Don't Break Me"), and over three hours, the songs was counted down from 40 to 1, with the top twenty songs being playing in full. Iceland's Daði og Gagnamagnið were crowned winners with "Think About Things".

Der kleine Song Contest (English: The Little Song Contest) was organised and broadcast by the Austrian broadcaster Österreichischer Rundfunk (ORF). The competition consisted of three semi-finals between 14 and 18 April 2020 and a final on 18 April 2020, and was hosted by Andi Knoll. All shows were broadcast on the television channel ORF 1, as well as on the streaming platform ORF-TVthek.

Eurovision 2020 – das deutsche Finale (English: Eurovision 2020 - The German Final) was organised and broadcast by the German broadcaster Norddeutscher Rundfunk (NDR). The competition consisted of a pre-qualifying round on 9 May 2020 and a final on 16 May 2020.

Eurovision: Come Together was organised and broadcast by the British Broadcasting Corporation (BBC). Hosted by Graham Norton on 16 May 2020 and broadcast live on BBC One, an online vote determined the UK public's most popular Eurovision entry in its 64-year history, from a selection of 19 previous competing songs.

Okkar 12 stig (English: Our 12 Points) was organised and broadcast by the Icelandic broadcaster Ríkisútvarpið (RÚV).

Pesem Evrovizije: Najboljših 25 (English: Eurovision Song Contest: Top 25) was organised and broadcast by the Slovenian broadcaster RTV Slovenija. The ranking of all Slovenian Eurovision entries (excluding the songs that represented Yugoslavia), decided by over 30,000 online votes, was revealed on the show. Slovenian artists and presenters associated with Eurovision gave their opinions on the 25 songs, and interviews were held with several past Slovenian participants. During the broadcast, it was revealed that Ana Soklič, who had been selected to represent Slovenia in 2020, would remain as the country's entrant in 2021.

Sveriges 12:a (English: "Sweden's 12 [points]") was organised and broadcast by the Swedish broadcaster Sveriges Television (SVT). The competition consisted of a pre-qualifying round on 9 May 2020, hosted by Christer Björkman and David Sundin, and a final on 14 May 2020, hosted by Christer Björkman and Sarah Dawn Finer. Both shows were broadcast live on SVT1, as well as on the streaming platform SVT Play. The winning entry – the hypothetical recipient of Sweden's 12 points – was the Icelandic entry "Think About Things".

== Other awards ==
=== OGAE ===
OGAE, an organisation of over forty Eurovision Song Contest fan clubs across Europe and beyond, conducts an annual voting poll. After all votes were cast, the top-ranked entry in the 2020 poll was Lithuania's "On Fire" by The Roop; the top five results are shown below.

Country	Song	Artist	Points
Lithuania	"On Fire"	The Roop	430
Iceland	"Think About Things"	Daði og Gagnamagnið	304
Switzerland	"Répondez-moi"	Gjon's Tears	297
Italy	"Fai rumore"	Diodato	226
Bulgaria	"Tears Getting Sober"	Victoria	197

== Official album ==
Cover art of the official album

Eurovision: A Tribute to the Artists and Songs 2020 is the official compilation album of the contest, put together by the European Broadcasting Union and containing all 41 songs that would have taken part in the competition. It was originally scheduled to be released by Universal Music Group physically and digitally on 17 April 2020 but was delayed to 8 May, and later to 15 May.

=== Charts ===
Chart (2020)	Peak position
Australian Albums (ARIA)	42
Austrian Compilation Albums (Ö3 Austria)	1
Belgian Compilation Albums (Ultratop 50 Flanders)	1
Belgian Compilation Albums (Ultratop 50 Wallonia)	3
Croatian International Albums (HDU)	15
Danish Compilation Albums (Tracklisten)	2
Dutch Compilation Albums (Compilation Top 30)	1
Finnish Albums (Suomen virallinen lista)	24
French Physical Albums (SNEP)	134
German Compilation Albums (Offizielle Top 100)	2
Irish Compilation Albums (IRMA)	4
Swedish Albums (Sverigetopplistan)	21
Swiss Compilation Albums (Schweizer Hitparade)	1
UK Compilation Albums (Official Charts)	2
US Top Compilation Albums (Billboard)	15

== See also ==
- Eurovision Song Contest: The Story of Fire Saga, a film featuring a fictional Eurovision Song Contest 2020
- Junior Eurovision Song Contest 2020
