= Discoteque (song) =

2021 song by The Roop

Single by the Roop

from the album Concrete Flower
- Released: 22 January 2021
- Genre: Electro-pop
- Length: 3:01
- Label: Warner
- Songwriters: Vaidotas Valiukevičius; Laisvūnas Černovas; Mantas Banišauskas; Robertas Baranauskas; Ilkka Wirtanen; Kalle Lindroth
- Producers: Laisvūnas Černovas; Vaidotas Valiukevičius

The Roop singles chronology
"On Fire" (2020)	"Discoteque" (2021)	"Ohmygodable" (2021)

Music video
- "Discoteque" on YouTube

Eurovision Song Contest 2021 entry
- Country: Lithuania
- Artist: The Roop
- Language: English
- Composers: Vaidotas Valiukevičius; Robertas Baranauskas; Mantas Banišauskas; Laisvūnas Černovas; Ilkka Wirtanen
- Lyricists: Vaidotas Valiukevičius; Mantas Banišauskas; Kalle Lindroth

Finals performance
- Semi-final result: 4th
- Semi-final points: 203
- Final result: 8th
- Final points: 220

Entry chronology
- ◄ "On Fire" (2020)
- "Sentimentai" (2022) ►

"Discoteque" is a song by Lithuanian pop-rock band the Roop. The song represented Lithuania in the Eurovision Song Contest 2021 in Rotterdam, the Netherlands, after winning the pre-selection competition Pabandom iš Naujo! 2021.

== At Eurovision ==
The 65th edition of the Eurovision Song Contest took place in Rotterdam, the Netherlands and consisted of two semi-finals on 18 May and 20 May 2021, and the grand final on 22 May 2021. According to the Eurovision rules, all participating countries, except the host nation and the "Big Five", consisting of France, Germany, Italy, Spain and the United Kingdom, are required to qualify from one of two semi-finals to compete for the final, although the top 10 countries from the respective semi-final progress to the grand final. On 17 November 2020, it was announced that Lithuania would be performing in the first half of the first semi-final of the contest. On 18 May, after competing in the first semi-final, Lithuania was announced as having qualified for the final round, receiving 203 points, garnering them the 4th place in the ranking of the semifinal.

Lithuania's "Discoteque" received 220 points and finished 8th in the competition, the best result of the country since 2006.

== Personnel ==
Credits adapted from Tidal.

- Laisvūnas Černovas – producer, keyboards, masterer, mixer, writer
- Vaidotas Valiukevičius – producer, keyboards, mixer, vocals, writer
- Robertas Baranauskas – bass, keyboards, writer
- Mantas Banišauskas – guitar, writer
- The Roop – vocals
- Ilkka Wirtanen – writer
- Kalle Lindroth – writer

== Charts ==
Chart performance for "Discoteque"
Chart (2021)	Peak position
Belgium (Ultratip Bubbling Under Flanders)	4
Finland (Suomen virallinen lista)	19
Greece International (IFPI)	42
Iceland (Tónlistinn)	23
Ireland (IRMA)	75
Lithuania (AGATA)	1
Netherlands (Single Top 100)	49
Sweden (Sverigetopplistan)	39
UK Singles Downloads (Official Charts)	35
UK Independent (Official Charts)	27

== Certifications ==
Certifications for "Discoteque"
Region	Certification	Certified units/sales
Lithuania (AGATA)	Platinum	4,000,000^{†}
^{†} Streaming-only figures based on certification alone.

== Release history ==
Release history and formats for "Discoteque"
Region	Date	Format(s)	Label	Ref.
Various	21 January 2021	Digital download; streaming	Musica Publica	
