= Lithuania in the Eurovision Song Contest 2020 =

- Eurovision Song Contest 2020
- Country: Lithuania
- Selection process: Pabandom iš naujo! 2020
- Selection date: 15 February 2020

Competing entry
- Song: "On Fire"
- Artist: The Roop
- Songwriters: Vaidotas Valiukevičius; Robertas Baranauskas; Mantas Banišauskas

Placement
- Final result: Cancelled

Participation chronology

Lithuania was set to be represented at the Eurovision Song Contest 2020 with the song "On Fire" written by Vaidotas Valiukevičius, Robertas Baranauskas, and Mantas Banišauskas. The song was performed by the band The Roop. The Lithuanian broadcaster Lithuanian National Radio and Television (LRT) organised the national final Pabandom iš naujo! 2020 (Let's try again! 2020) in order to select the Lithuanian entry for the 2020 contest in Rotterdam, Netherlands. The national final took place over six weeks and involved 36 competing entries. The results of each show were determined by the combination of votes from a jury panel and a public vote. In the final, eight artists and songs remained and "On Fire", performed by the Roop, was selected as the winner.

Lithuania was drawn to compete in the first semi-final of the Eurovision Song Contest, which should've taken place on 12 May 2020. The contest was cancelled.

== Background ==
Prior to the 2020 Contest, Lithuania had participated in the Eurovision Song Contest twenty times since its first entry in 1994. The nation's best placing in the contest was sixth, which it achieved in 2006 with the song "We Are the Winners", performed by LT United. Following the introduction of semi-finals for the 2004, Lithuania, to this point, had managed to qualify to the final nine times. In the 2019 contest, "Run with the Lions" performed by Jurij Veklenko failed to qualify to the final.

For the 2020 contest, the Lithuanian national broadcaster, Lithuanian National Radio and Television (LRT), broadcast the event within Lithuania and organised the selection process for the nation's entry. Other than the internal selection of their debut entry in 1994, Lithuania has selected their entry consistently through a national final procedure. LRT confirmed their intentions to participate at the 2020 Eurovision Song Contest on 26 May 2019. On 26 September 2019, the broadcaster announced the organization of Pabandom iš naujo!, which would be the national final to select Lithuania's entry for Rotterdam.

== Before Eurovision ==
=== Pabandom iš naujo! 2020 ===
Pabandom iš naujo! 2020 (Let's try again! 2020) was the national final format developed by LRT in order to select Lithuania's entry for the Eurovision Song Contest 2020. The competition involved a six-week-long process that commenced on 11 January 2020 and concluded with a winning song and artist on 15 February 2020. The six shows were hosted by Gabrielė Martirosianaitė, Giedrius Masalskis, and Ieva Zasimauskaitė, and were broadcast on LRT televizija, LRT Lituanica, and LRT Radijas, as well as online via the broadcaster's website lrt.lt.

==== Format ====
The 2020 competition involved 36 entries and consisted of six shows. The first three shows were the heats, consisting of 12 entries each. The top six entries from each heat proceeded in the competition, with the remaining 18 entries participated in the fifth and sixth shows, which were the competition's semi-finals. Here, nine entries participated in each show and the top four proceeded to the final. In the final, the winner was selected from the remaining eight entries. The results of each of the six shows were determined by the 50/50 combination of votes from a jury panel and public televoting. The ranking developed by both streams of voting was converted to points from 1-8, 10 and 12 and assigned based on the number of competing songs in the respective show. During the first five shows, the jury votes were determined by a five-member Lithuanian jury panel only. In the final, an eight-member Lithuanian panel and a three-member international panel voted. The public could vote through telephone and SMS voting. Ties in all shows were decided in favour of the entry that received the most points from the jury.

==== Competing entries ====
On 30 September 2019, LRT opened two separate submission forms: one for artists and another for songwriters to submit their songs. Artists that applied to compete with a song were required to indicate which song they wanted to compete with on their application. The submission deadline for both applications concluded on 8 December 2019. On 3 January 2020, LRT announced the 36 artists selected for the competition from more than 60 submissions received.

Artist	Song	Songwriter(s)
Abrokenleg	"Electric Boy"	Aistė Motiejūnaitė, Darjuš Loznikov, Edvard Ragoža, Adas Gecevičius
Aika	"Paradas"	Jekaterina Fiodorova
Aistay	"Dangus man tu"	Aistė Tomkevičiūtė-Pajaujienė
Aistė Pilvelytė	"Unbreakable"	Thomas G:son, Johnny Sanchez
Alen Chicco	"Somewhere Out There"	Tomas Alenčikas, Faustas Venckus
Andy Vaic	"Why Why Why"	Andrius Vaicenavičius
Antturi	"I Gotta Do"	Žeraldas Povilaitis, Marija Povilaitė
The Backs	"Fully"	Berta Timinskaitė, Artiomas Penkevičius, Algė Matekūnaitė, Eglė Gadeikytė, Silvija Pankūnaitė
Baltos Varnos	"Namų dvasia"	Milda Andrijauskaitė-Bakanauskienė, Teresė Andrijauskaitė
Bernardas	"Dad, Don't Be Mad at Me"	Bernardas Garbačauskas
Donata Virbilaitė	"Made of Wax"	Christopher Wortley, Niko Westelinck, Hannah Brine, DWB
Evgenya Redko	"Far"	Asaf Yehuda, Evgenya Redko, Rolandas Venckys
Gabrielius Vagelis	"Tave čia randu"	Gabrielius Vagelis
Germanas Skoris	"Chemistry (Breaking Free)"	Germanas Skoris
Glossarium	"Game Over"	Saulius Šivickas, Tadas Kaminskas, Lukas Gubanovas, Aivaras Daniel, Aurimas Jazdauskas
Indraya	"You and I"	Andrius Bernatonis, Joel Wayman
Justina Žukauskaitė	"Breathe In"	Samuel Bugia Garrido, Justina Žukauskaitė
Justinas Lapatinskas	"Highway Story"	Justinas Stanislovaitis, Justinas Lapatinskas, Marius Matulevičius
Kayra	"Alligator"	Kristina Radžiukynaitė, Marius Leskauskas
Kristina Jure	"My Sound of Silence"	Aurimas Papečkys
Lukas Bartaška	"Where Is That Change?"	Leonardas Pilkauskas, Lukas Bartaška
Lukas Norkūnas	"Atsiprašyk"	Lukas Norkūnas
Meandi	"Drip"	Saulius Šemiotas
Monika Marija	"If I Leave"	Monika Marija Paulauskaitė, Marius Leskauskas
Monique	"Make Me Human"	Vytautas Bikus
Nombeko Augustė	"Reikia man"	Kasparas Barisas, Nombeko Augustė Khotseng
Petunija	"Show Ya"	Agnė Šiaulytė, Kęstutis Vaitkevičius, Adas Gecevičius
Rokas Povilius	"Vilnius Calling"	Rokas Povilius
The Roop	"On Fire"	Vaidotas Valiukevičius, Robertas Baranauskas, Mantas Banišauskas
Ruslanas Kirilkinas	"Soldier's Heart"	Edgaras Lubys
Rūta Loop	"We Came from the Sun"	Rūta Žibaitytė, Kasparas Meginis, Edgaras Žaltauskas, Paulius Vaicekauskas
Soliaris	"Breath"	Rolandas Venckys, Viktoras Olechnovičius, Algimantas Minalga, Ray Andre
Twosome	"Playa"	Justinas Stanislovaitis, Paulius Šinkūnas, Marius Matulevičius
Viktorija Miškūnaitė	"The Ocean"	Jacob Jonia, Viktorija Miškūnaitė
Vitalijus Špokaitis	"Nemušk savęs"	Dominykas Vaitiekūnas, Rolandas Venckys, Dovydas Kiauka
Voldemars Petersons	"Wings of Freedom"	Voldemars Petersons

==== Jury members ====
Jury members by show
Jury member	Heats			Semi-finals		Final	Occupation(s)
Jury member	1	2	3	1	2	Final	Occupation(s)
Gerūta Griniūtė	Yes	Yes	No	No	Yes	Yes	radio host, Eurovision commentator
Vaidas Stackevičius	Yes	No	Yes	Yes	No	Yes	producer
Leonas Somovas	Yes	No	Yes	No	Yes	Yes	producer and composer
Ramūnas Zilnys	No	No	Yes	Yes	Yes	Yes	music reviewer, radio host
Giedrė Kilčiauskienė	Yes	No	No	Yes	Yes	No	singer-songwriter
Jievaras Jasinskis	No	Yes	Yes	No	Yes	No	composer and musician
Darius Užkuraitis	Yes	Yes	No	No	No	No	radio host, Eurovision commentator
Aistė Smilgevičiūtė	No	Yes	No	No	No	Yes	1999 Lithuanian representative
Viktoras Diawara	No	Yes	No	No	No	Yes	singer, producer, and 2001 and 2006 Lithuanian representative
Monika Linkytė	No	No	Yes	Yes	No	No	2015 Lithuanian representative
Andrius Mamontovas	No	No	No	Yes	No	No	musician
Justė Arlauskaitė-Jazzu	No	No	No	No	No	Yes	singer-songwriter
Simona Albavičiūtė-Bandita	No	No	No	No	No	Yes	radio host
Zita Kaminska	No	No	No	No	No	Yes	Latvian director and producer
Myles Jessop	No	No	No	No	No	Yes	British artist agent
Anthony Marshall	No	No	No	No	No	Yes	British songwriter, producer, and musician

==== Shows ====
===== Heats =====
The three heats of the competition aired from the LRT studios in Vilnius on 11, 18, and 25 January 2020 and featured twelve entries each. The top six from each heat advanced to the semi-finals, while the bottom six were eliminated.

Key: Semi-finalist

Heat 1 – 11 January 2020
R/O	Artist	Song	Jury		Televote		Total	Place
R/O	Artist	Song	Votes	Points	Votes	Points	Total	Place
1	Glossarium	"Game Over"	18	4	218	2	6	8
2	Baltos Varnos	"Namų dvasia"	46	10	592	10	20	2
3	Justinas Lapatinskas	"Highway Story"	8	1	43	0	1	10
4	Aistay	"Dangus man tu"	11	2	228	3	5	9
5	Petunija	"Show Ya"	24	6	240	5	11	6
6	Lukas Norkūnas	"Atsiprašyk"	1	0	83	0	0	12
7	Donata Virbilaitė	"Made of Wax"	4	0	125	1	1	11
8	Andy Vaic	"Why Why Why"	22	5	446	7	12	5
9	Aika	"Paradas"	18	4	237	4	8	7
10	Meandi	"Drip"	46	10	461	8	18	3
11	Monika Marija	"If I Leave"	54	12	1,006	12	24	1
12	Gabrielius Vagelis	"Tave čia randu"	38	7	394	6	13	4

Heat 2 – 18 January 2020
R/O	Artist	Song	Jury		Televote		Total	Place
R/O	Artist	Song	Votes	Points	Votes	Points	Total	Place
1	Rūta Loop	"We Came from the Sun"	45	10	523	7	17	3
2	Soliaris	"Breath"	22	5	179	1	6	7
3	Kristina Jure	"My Sound of Silence"	28	6	1,071	12	18	2
4	Alen Chicco	"Somewhere Out There"	39	8	522	6	14	5
5	Indraya	"You and I"	3	0	264	2	2	12
6	Germanas Skoris	"Chemistry (Breaking Free)"	18	4	428	4	8	6
7	Viktorija Miškūnaitė	"The Ocean"	34	7	670	8	15	4
8	Antturi	"I Gotta Do"	11	1	266	3	4	9
9	Abrokenleg	"Electric Boy"	14	3	142	0	3	10
10	Twosome	"Playa"	4	0	517	5	5	8
11	Monique	"Make Me Human"	60	12	851	10	22	1
12	Voldemars Petersons	"Wings of Freedom"	12	2	155	0	2	11

Heat 3 – 25 January 2020
R/O	Artist	Song	Jury		Televote		Total	Place
R/O	Artist	Song	Votes	Points	Votes	Points	Total	Place
1	The Backs	"Fully"	12	2	757	7	9	6
2	Bernardas	"Dad, Don't Be Mad at Me"	2	0	703	6	6	9
3	Justina Žukauskaitė	"Breathe In"	10	1	239	1	2	11
4	Rokas Povilius	"Vilnius Calling"	26	6	526	5	11	5
5	Kayra	"Alligator"	33	7	1,240	8	15	3
6	Lukas Bartaška	"Where Is That Change?"	1	0	93	0	0	12
7	Evgenya Redko	"Far"	50	10	423	4	14	4
8	Ruslanas Kirilkinas	"Soldier's Heart"	17	4	383	3	7	8
9	Nombeko Augustė	"Reikia man"	26	6	247	2	8	7
10	Vitalijus Špokaitis	"Nemušk savęs"	13	3	183	0	3	10
11	Aistė Pilvelytė	"Unbreakable"	46	8	1,692	10	18	2
12	The Roop	"On Fire"	54	12	2,175	12	24	1

===== Semi-finals =====
The two semi-finals of the competition aired from the LRT studios in Vilnius on 1 and 8 February 2020 and featured all remaining entries in the competition. On 2 February 2020, Evgenya Redko withdrew from the competition due to a spinal hernia. She was scheduled to compete in the second semi-final.

Key: Finalist Absent

Semi-final 1 – 1 February 2020
R/O	Artist	Song	Jury		Televote		Total	Place
R/O	Artist	Song	Votes	Points	Votes	Points	Total	Place
1	Kayra	"Alligator"	34	7	2,080	8	15	3
2	Viktorija Miškūnaitė	"The Ocean"	11	2	862	3	5	9
3	Baltos Varnos	"Namų dvasia"	32	6	1,258	7	13	5
4	Rūta Loop	"We Came from the Sun"	35	8	1,224	6	14	4
5	Gabrielius Vagelis	"Tave čia randu"	24	4	576	2	6	8
6	The Roop	"On Fire"	45	10	5,192	12	22	2
7	Kristina Jure	"My Sound of Silence"	19	3	963	4	7	7
8	Alen Chicco	"Somewhere Out There"	29	5	1,096	5	10	6
9	Aistė Pilvelytė	"Unbreakable"	56	12	2,521	10	22	1

Semi-final 2 – 8 February 2020
R/O	Artist	Song	Jury		Televote		Total	Place
R/O	Artist	Song	Votes	Points	Votes	Points	Total	Place
1	Meandi	"Drip"	40	8	486	6	14	3
2	Petunija	"Show Ya"	23	4	195	3	7	7
3	Germanas Skoris	"Chemistry (Breaking Free)"	33	7	339	5	12	5
4	Monique	"Make Me Human"	54	10	2,618	12	22	2
5	Rokas Povilius	"Vilnius Calling"	26	5	588	7	12	6
6	Monika Marija	"If I Leave"	56	12	1,652	10	22	1
7	Andy Vaic	"Why Why Why"	15	3	321	4	7	8
8	The Backs	"Fully"	28	6	606	8	14	4
—N/a	Evgenya Redko	"Far"	Withdrew (Note: Evgenya Redko was originally supposed to compete in the second semi-final but she withdrew from the competition due to a spinal hernia.)					

===== Final =====
The final of the competition took place on 15 February 2020 at the Žalgirio Arena in Kaunas and featured the remaining eight entries that qualified from the semi-finals. The final was the only show in the competition to be broadcast live; all other preceding shows were pre-recorded earlier in the week before their airdates. Jury voting in the final was decided by an eight-member Lithuanian panel and a three-member international panel. "On Fire", performed by the Roop, was selected as the winner after gaining the most points from both the jury vote and the public vote. In addition to the performances of the competing entries, Jurijus opened the show with the 2019 Lithuanian Eurovision entry "Run with the Lions", while the interval acts included juror Jazzu performing the songs "Welcome", "Dumblas", and "Wild", and Samanta Tīna performing the 2020 Latvian Eurovision entry "Still Breathing".

Due to the high influx of SMS votes, around 25,000 televotes were delayed and not considered in the final score. TCG Telecom contacted the organisers the following day and, in co-operation, Grand Thornton Baltic adjusted the scores. These changes did not change the final ranked order, but increased The Roop's winning margin.

Final – 15 February 2020
R/O	Artist	Song	Jury		Televote		Total	Place
R/O	Artist	Song	Votes	Points	Votes	Points	Total	Place
1	Aistė Pilvelytė	"Unbreakable"	62	5	7,370	8	13	5
2	Rūta Loop	"We Came from the Sun"	75	7	1,866	6	13	4
3	Kayra	"Alligator"	47	4	1,308	5	9	7
4	Monika Marija	"If I Leave"	87	8	6,570	7	15	3
5	Meandi	"Drip"	63	6	703	3	9	6
6	The Roop	"On Fire"	128	12	50,139	12	24	1
7	The Backs	"Fully"	42	3	966	4	7	8
8	Monique	"Make Me Human"	101	10	15,962	10	20	2

== At Eurovision ==
According to Eurovision rules, all nations with the exceptions of the host country and the "Big Five" (France, Germany, Italy, Spain and the United Kingdom) are required to qualify from one of two semi-finals in order to compete for the final; the top ten countries from each semi-final progress to the final. The European Broadcasting Union (EBU) split up the competing countries into six different pots based on voting patterns from previous contests, with countries with favourable voting histories put into the same pot. On 28 January 2020, an allocation draw was held which placed each country into one of the two semi-finals, as well as which half of the show they would perform in. Lithuania was placed into the first semi-final, to be held on 12 May 2020, and was scheduled to perform in the second half of the show. However, due to the COVID-19 pandemic in Europe, the contest was cancelled on 18 March 2020.

Prior to the Eurovision Song Celebration YouTube broadcast in place of the semi-finals, it was revealed that Lithuania had been set to perform in position 6, following the entry from Slovenia and preceding the entry from Ireland.

=== Alternative song contests ===
Some of the broadcasters scheduled to take part in the Eurovision Song Contest 2020 organised alternative competitions. Austria's ORF broadcast Der kleine Song Contest in April 2020, which saw every entry being assigned to one of three semi-finals. A jury consisting of 10 singers that had represented Austria in the Eurovision Song Contest were tasked with ranking each song; the best-placed entry in each semi-final advanced to the final round. In the second semi-final on 16 April 2020, Lithuania placed sixth in a field of 14 participants, achieving 57 points. Lithuania's song also partook in Sveriges Television's Sveriges 12:a in May, and was qualified to the final round, where it tied for fourth place with Russia.
