= The Roop =

Lithuanian pop band

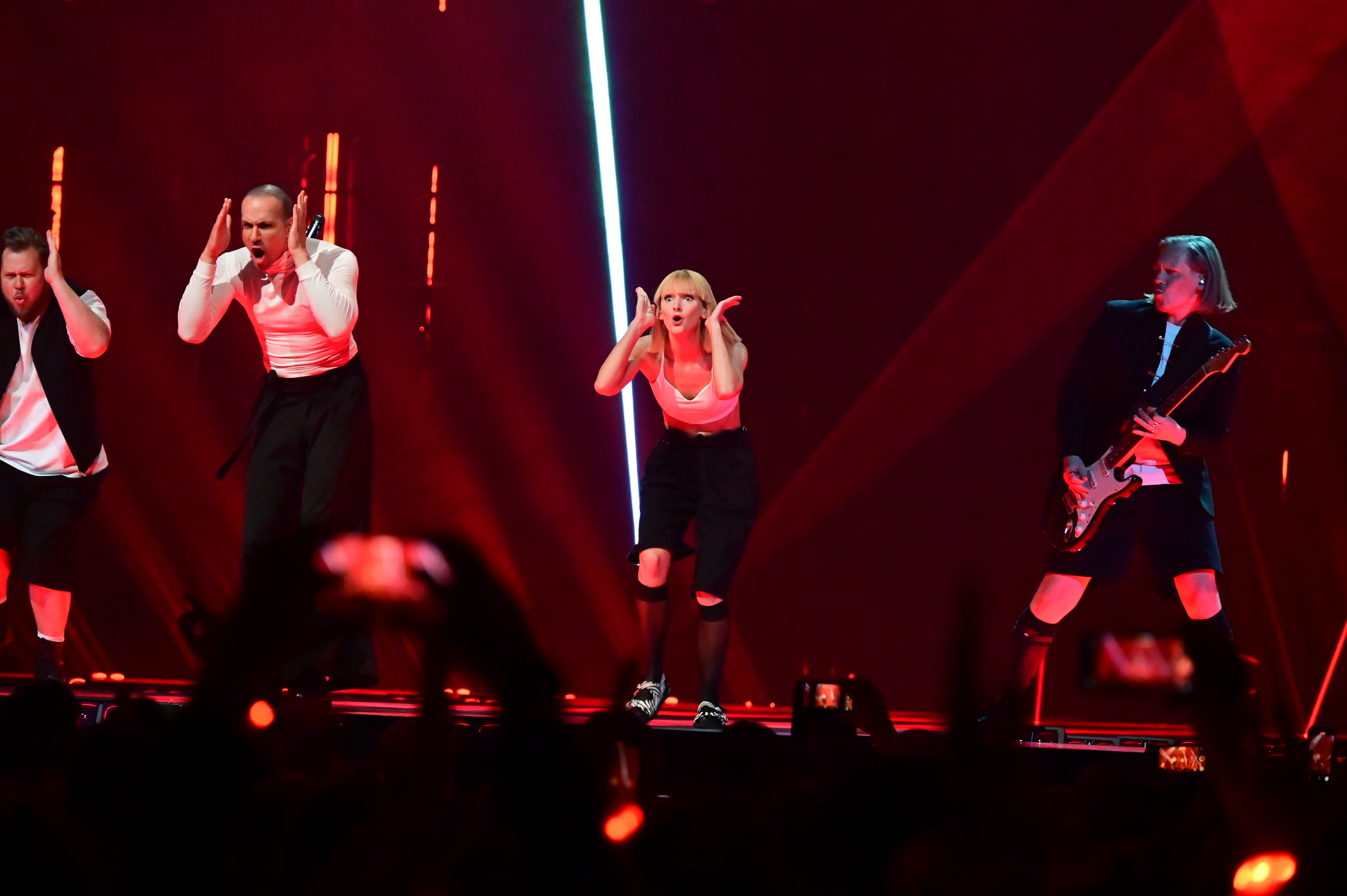
- The Roop in 2025

Background information
- Origin: Vilnius, Lithuania
- Genres: Pop rock; soft rock; dance-rock; electronica; indie
- Years active: 2014–present
- Labels: Musica Publica; Warner
- Members: Vaidotas Valiukevičius; Robertas Baranauskas; Mantas Banišauskas
- Past members: Vainius Šimukėnas
- Website: theroop.com

The Roop (stylised in all caps) are a Lithuanian pop rock band from Vilnius. Formed in 2014, the group consists of lead vocalist Vaidotas Valiukevičius, percussionist Robertas Baranauskas and guitarist Mantas Banišauskas. The group has released three albums – To Whom It May Concern in 2015, Ghosts in 2017 and Concrete Flower in 2022 – as well as the extended play Yes, I Do in 2018. They were due to represent Lithuania in the Eurovision Song Contest 2020 with their song "On Fire" before the contest was cancelled. They then took part in the Eurovision Song Contest 2021 with "Discoteque", finishing eighth.

== Career ==
=== 2014–2018: To Whom it May Concern ===
The band were formed in 2014 and featured Vaidotas Valiukevičius, a former member of the Baltic boybands Kosmo and Omega, who had been recording as Milanno in the 2000s, an act who had released songs such as "Nieko nereikia daugiau". After giving up on Milanno in 2010, Valiukevičius took a break from music until forming The Roop, where he took on a new musical direction with bandmates Robertas Baranauskas and Mantas Banišauskas. In 2015, their debut album To Whom it May Concern was released.

=== 2018–present: Eurovision Song Contest ===
The Roop attempted to compete in the Eurovision Song Contest three times. They took part in Lithuania's 2018 national selection with the song "Yes, I Do". In the final, they received 16,491 votes (the second-highest ranking) from the public and came third overall. The Roop returned for the 2020 edition, Pabandom iš naujo! 2020, in the final of which it won both the public vote (with 50,139 votes) and the jury vote. The Roop was thus set to represent Lithuania with "On Fire" at the Eurovision Song Contest 2020 in May that year. The Eurovision Song Contest 2020 was cancelled in March 2020 due to the COVID-19 pandemic. Several countries held alternatives to the contest and ranked the 2020 entries themselves; The Roop won Eurovision 2020 - Das Deutsche Finale, one of the replacing shows. The Lithuanian national broadcaster, Lithuanian National Radio and Television, decided to hold a new national selection for the 2021 contest and guaranteed the Roop a place in the final. The Roop announced their intent to participate again in November 2020. They released their competing song, "Discoteque", in January 2021. The song won the selection, winning the jury vote and surpassing 74,000 televotes in the final, and finished 8th representing Lithuania in the Eurovision Song Contest 2021. The band performed with dancers and choreographers Miglė Praniauskaitė and Marijanas Staniulenas.

On 19 December 2023, the band was announced among the competing artists of Eurovizija.LT, the Lithuanian national final for the Eurovision Song Contest 2024, with the song "Simple Joy". On 10 February 2024, they came first in their semi-final, qualifying for the final of 17 February. There, they made it to the superfinal round, ultimately finishing third.

The Roop were selected to open for two concerts by English singer-songwriter Ed Sheeran at the Darius and Girėnas Stadium in Kaunas. These concerts took place on August 3 and 4, 2024.

On 15 May 2025, The Roop were invited to participate in the Eurovision Song Contest in Basel as a guest performance. They performed a special number in the second semi-final, presenting their 2020 song "On Fire". This marked the first time that Lithuanian representatives were invited to perform an original song in the main Eurovision program as guest artists.

In December 2025 the band announced the dates of their first ever European headline tour to take place in the spring of 2026. Initially focused on Northern Europe, in the accompanying posts on their social media, the band said that they were looking to expand those dates in the spring and into the autumn of 2026.

In 2026, the UK’s BBC Radio 2 shortlisted THE ROOP among 70 iconic Eurovision acts for the contest’s 70th anniversary “Ultimate Eurovision Superstar” celebration.

== Discography ==
=== Studio albums ===
Title	Details	Peak chart positions
Title	Details	LTU
To Whom It May Concern	Released: 30 November 2015; Label: Musica Publica; Formats: Physical, digital download, streaming	78
Ghosts	Released: 13 October 2017; Label: Musica Publica; Formats: Physical, digital download, streaming	34
Concrete Flower	Released: 11 May 2022; Label: Warner Music Finland; Formats: Physical, digital download, streaming	31
Momentum	Released: 2 May 2025; Label: Musica Publica; Formats: Physical, digital download, streaming	—

=== Extended plays ===
Title	Details
Yes, I Do	Released: 25 May 2018; Label: Musica Publica; Format: Physical, digital download, streaming

=== Singles ===
Title	Year	Peak chart positions							Certifications	Album or EP
Title	Year	LTU	BEL (FL) Tip	FIN	IRE	NLD	SWE	UK Down.	Certifications	Album or EP
"Hello"	2016	—	—	—	—	—	—	—		Ghosts
"Dream On"	2017	—	—	—	—	—	—	—		Ghosts
"Keista draugystė"	2017	—	—	—	—	—	—	—		Ghosts
"Yes, I Do"	2018	48	—	—	—	—	—	—		Yes, I Do
"Silly Me"	2019	—	—	—	—	—	—	—		Yes, I Do
"Dance with Your Hands"	2019	—	—	—	—	—	—	—		Yes, I Do
"On Fire"	2020	1	—	—	—	—	—	—	AGATA: Gold	Concrete Flower
"Discoteque"	2021	1	4	19	75	49	39	35	AGATA: Platinum	Concrete Flower
"Ohmygodable"	2021	68	—	—	—	—	—	—		Concrete Flower
"Love Is All We Got"	2022	—	—	—	—	—	—	—		Concrete Flower
"Let's Get Naked"	2022	—	—	—	—	—	—	—		Concrete Flower
"Šiluma"	2022	—	—	—	—	—	—	—		Non-album singles
"Kalėdų atvirukas"	2022	—	—	—	—	—	—	—		Non-album singles
"Pavasaris"	2023	—	—	—	—	—	—	—		Non-album singles
"Simple Joy"	2024	7	—	—	—	—	—	—		Momentum
"Steal Me"	2025	—	—	—	—	—	—	—		Momentum
"Chica Chico"	2025	—	—	—	—	—	—	—		Momentum
"Just Think About It"	2025	—	—	—	—	—	—	—		Momentum
"—" denotes a recording that did not chart or was not released.

=== Other charted songs ===
Title	Year	Peak chart positions	Album or EP
Title	Year	LTU Air.	Album or EP
"Chica Chico"	2025	45	Momentum

== Awards and nominations ==
Year	Award	Category	Nominee/Work	Result
2015	M.A.M.A.	Best Music Video	"Not Too Late"	Nominated
2020	Eurovision 2020 – das deutsche Finale		"On Fire"	Won
2020	M.A.M.A.	Best Music Video	"On Fire"	Nominated
2020	M.A.M.A.	Best Song	"On Fire"	Won
2020	M.A.M.A.	Breakthrough of the Year	The Roop	Won
2020	M.A.M.A.	Best Pop Act	The Roop	Won
2020	M.A.M.A.	Best Band	The Roop	Won
2020	LRT	Ambassador of the Year	The Roop	Won
2021	M.A.M.A.	Best Song	"Discoteque"	Nominated
2021	M.A.M.A.	Best Music Video	"Discoteque"	Won
2021	M.A.M.A.	Best Pop Act	The Roop	Won
2021	M.A.M.A.	Best Band	The Roop	Won
2021	Tourism's Most Successful	Tourism Ambassador	The Roop	Won
2021	AGATA	Most Streamed Lithuanian Song on YouTube	"Discoteque"	Won
2021	AGATA	Lithuanian Song with Most Radio Airplay	"Discoteque"	Won
2021	KLIPVID	Best Cinematography	"Ohmygodable"	Won
2022	M.A.M.A.	Best Band	The Roop	Nominated
2022	M.A.M.A.	Best Music Video	"Let's Get Naked"	Nominated
2022	Berlin Music Video Awards	Best Performer	"Discoteque"	Nominated

Preceded by Jurijus Veklenko with "Run with the Lions"	Lithuania in the Eurovision Song Contest; 2020 (cancelled)	Succeeded by The Roop with "Discoteque"
Preceded by The Roop with "On Fire"	Lithuania in the Eurovision Song Contest; 2021	Succeeded by Monika Liu with "Sentimentai"
