= On Fire (The Roop song) =

2020 single by The Roop

Single by The Roop

from the album Concrete Flower
- Released: 17 January 2020
- Genre: Pop rock
- Length: 2:50
- Label: Musica Publica
- Songwriters: Vaidotas Valiukevičius; Robertas Baranauskas; Mantas Banišauskas

The Roop singles chronology
"Dance with Your Hands" (2019)	"On Fire" (2020)	"Discoteque" (2021)

Music video
- "On Fire" on YouTube

Eurovision Song Contest 2020 entry
- Country: Lithuania
- Artist: The Roop
- Language: English
- Composers: Vaidotas Valiukevičius; Robertas Baranauskas; Mantas Banišauskas
- Lyricist: Vaidotas Valiukevičius

Finals performance
- Semi-final result: Contest cancelled

Entry chronology
- ◄ "Run with the Lions" (2019)
- "Discoteque" (2021) ►

"On Fire" is a song by Lithuanian pop-rock band The Roop. The song was released as a digital download on 17 January 2020. It was scheduled to represent Lithuania in the Eurovision Song Contest 2020. After the cancellation of Eurovision 2020, it won Eurovision 2020 - das deutsche Finale, the German alternative Eurovision show.

== Eurovision Song Contest ==
The song was set to represent Lithuania in the Eurovision Song Contest 2020, after The Roop was selected through Pabandom iš naujo! 2020 (Let's try again! 2020), the music competition that selects Lithuania's entries for the Eurovision Song Contest. On 28 January 2020, a special allocation draw was held which placed each country into one of the two semi-finals, as well as which half of the show they would perform in. Lithuania was placed into the first semi-final, originally planned to be held on 12 May 2020 but later cancelled, and was scheduled to perform in the first half of the show.

== Charts ==
Chart (2020)	Peak position
Lithuania (AGATA)	1

== Certifications ==
Certifications for "On Fire"
Region	Certification	Certified units/sales
Lithuania (AGATA)	Gold	2,500,000^{†}
^{†} Streaming-only figures based on certification alone.

== Release history ==
Region	Date	Format	Label	Ref.
Various	17 January 2020	Digital download, streaming	Musica Publica	
