= Looking Back (Aksel Kankaanranta song) =

2020 song by Aksel Kankaanranta

Single by Aksel Kankaanranta
- Released: 28 January 2020
- Length: 2:51
- Label: The Fried Music Oy; EMI Finland
- Songwriter(s): Joonas Angeria; Whitney Phillips; Connor McDonough; Riley McDonough; Toby McDonough

Aksel Kankaanranta singles chronology
"Jättiläinen" (2018)	"Looking Back" (2020)	"Muista kuka oot" (2020)

Eurovision Song Contest 2020 entry
- Country: Finland
- Artist(s): Aksel Kankaanranta
- Languages: English
- Composer(s): Joonas Angeria; Whitney Phillips; Connor McDonough; Riley McDonough; Toby McDonough
- Lyricist(s): Joonas Angeria; Whitney Phillips; Connor McDonough; Riley McDonough; Toby McDonough

Finals performance
- Semi-final result: Contest cancelled

Entry chronology
- ◄ "Look Away" (2019)
- "Dark Side" (2021) ►

"Looking Back" is a song by Aksel Kankaanranta that would have represented Finland in the Eurovision Song Contest 2020.

== Eurovision Song Contest ==
The song would have represented Finland in the Eurovision Song Contest 2020, after Aksel Kankaanranta was selected through Uuden Musiikin Kilpailu 2020, the music competition that selects Finland's entries for the Eurovision Song Contest. On 28 January 2020, a special allocation draw was held which placed each country into one of the two semi-finals, as well as which half of the show they would perform in. Finland was placed into the second semi-final, to be held on 14 May 2020, and was scheduled to perform in the second half of the show.

On 18 March 2020, the European Broadcasting Union (EBU) announced that contest would be cancelled due to the COVID-19 pandemic.
