= Divlji vjetre =

2020 song

Single by Damir Kedžo

from the album Poljubi me sad
- Released: 1 March 2020
- Length: 3:00
- Label: Croatia Records
- Songwriter: Ante Pecotić
- Producers: Bojan Šalamon; Matija Rodić

Damir Kedžo singles chronology
"Poljubi me sad" (2019)	"Divlji vjetre" (2020)	"Nedodirljiva" (2020)

Eurovision Song Contest 2020 entry
- Country: Croatia
- Artist: Damir Kedžo
- Language: Croatian
- Composer: Ante Pecotić
- Lyricist: Ante Pecotić

Finals performance
- Semi-final result: Contest cancelled

Entry chronology
- ◄ "The Dream" (2019)
- "Tick-Tock" (2021) ►

"Divlji vjetre" (English: Wild Wind) is a song performed by Croatian singer Damir Kedžo. The track was written and composed by Ante Pecotić. It premiered on 29 February 2020, when it was performed during the final of Dora 2020, Croatia's national selection for the Eurovision Song Contest 2020, and was released as a digital download on 1 March 2020 by Croatia Records.

== Background and release ==
"Divlji vjetre" was one of sixteen songs commissioned by HRT for Dora 2020, Croatia's national selection for the Eurovision Song Contest 2020. Ante Pecotić composed "Divlji vjetre" specifically for Damir Kedžo. "Divlji vjetre" premiered on 29 February 2020, when it was performed in Dora 2020, Croatia's national selection for the Eurovision Song Contest 2020. The song became available through digital retailers and streaming services on 1 March 2020 via Croatia Records.

== At Eurovision ==
=== National selection ===
HRT allowed artists and composers to submit their entries for Dora 2020 between 5 November and 15 December 2019 for the selection of their entry for the Eurovision Song Contest 2020. On 23 December 2019, Kedžo was announced as one of the 16 participants in Dora 2020 with the song "Divlji vjetre". In the final, held on 29 February 2020, he won the televote and came second in the jury vote, placing first with 31 points and thus representing Croatia at the Eurovision Song Contest 2020.

=== In Rotterdam ===
The Eurovision Song Contest 2020 was supposed to take place at the Rotterdam Ahoy in Netherlands and would've consisted of two semi-finals on 12 and 14 May, and the final on 16 May 2020. However, the COVID-19 pandemic saw the cancellation of the contest. On 28 January 2020, a special allocation draw was held which placed each country into one of the two semi-finals, as well as which half of the show they would perform in. Croatia was placed into the first semi-final, to be held on 12 May 2020, and was scheduled to perform in the second half of the show.

== Commercial performance ==
"Divlji vjetre" debuted at number one on the Croatian HR Top 40, making it Kedžo's first song to do so and fourth overall to reach the top position.

== Track listing ==
Digital download
No.	Title	Length
1.	"Divlji vjetre"	3:00

Digital download
No.	Title	Length
1.	"Divlji vjetre" (Eurovision Edit)	3:00

== Charts ==
Chart (2020)	Peak position
Croatia (HR Top 40)	1

== Release history ==
Region	Date	Format	Label	Ref.
Various	1 March 2020	Digital download; streaming	Croatia Records	
