= Yes (Ben and Tan song) =

2020 song by Ben and Tan

Single by Ben and Tan
- Released: 8 March 2020
- Genre: Folk-pop
- Length: 3:00
- Label: The Arrangement
- Songwriters: Emil Rosendal Lei; Jimmy Jansson; Linnea Deb

Ben and Tan singles chronology
"Yes" (2020)	"Summer Nights" (2020)

Eurovision Song Contest 2020 entry
- Country: Denmark
- Artist: Ben and Tan
- Languages: English
- Composers: Emil Rosendal Lei; Jimmy Jansson; Linnea Deb
- Lyricists: Emil Rosendal Lei; Jimmy Jansson; Linnea Deb

Finals performance
- Semi-final result: Contest cancelled

Entry chronology
- ◄ "Love Is Forever" (2019)
- "Øve os på hinanden" (2021) ►

"Yes" is a song by Ben and Tan that would have gone to represent Denmark in the Eurovision Song Contest 2020. The song was released as a digital download on 8 March 2020.

== Eurovision Song Contest ==
The song would go represent Denmark in the Eurovision Song Contest 2020, after Ben and Tan was selected through Dansk Melodi Grand Prix 2020, the music competition that selects Denmark's entries for the Eurovision Song Contest. On 28 January 2020, a special allocation draw was held which placed each country into one of the two semi-finals, as well as which half of the show they would perform in. Denmark was placed into the second semi-final, to be held on 14 May 2020, and was scheduled to perform in the second half of the show. However, the contest was canceled on 18 March 2020 due to the COVID-19 pandemic.

== Track listing ==
Digital download
No.	Title	Length
1.	"Yes"	3:00
2.	"Yes" (Acoustic)	3:01

== Charts ==
Chart (2020)	Peak position
Denmark (Tracklisten)	30
Swedish Heatseeker (Sverigetopplistan)	18

== Certifications ==
Region	Certification	Certified units/sales
Sweden (GLF)	Gold	4,000,000^{†}
^{†} Streaming-only figures based on certification alone.

== Release history ==
Region	Date	Format	Label	Ref.
Various	8 March 2020	Digital download, streaming	The Arrangement	
