= Luca Hänni discography =

Lists of media performed by or featuring Luca Hänni

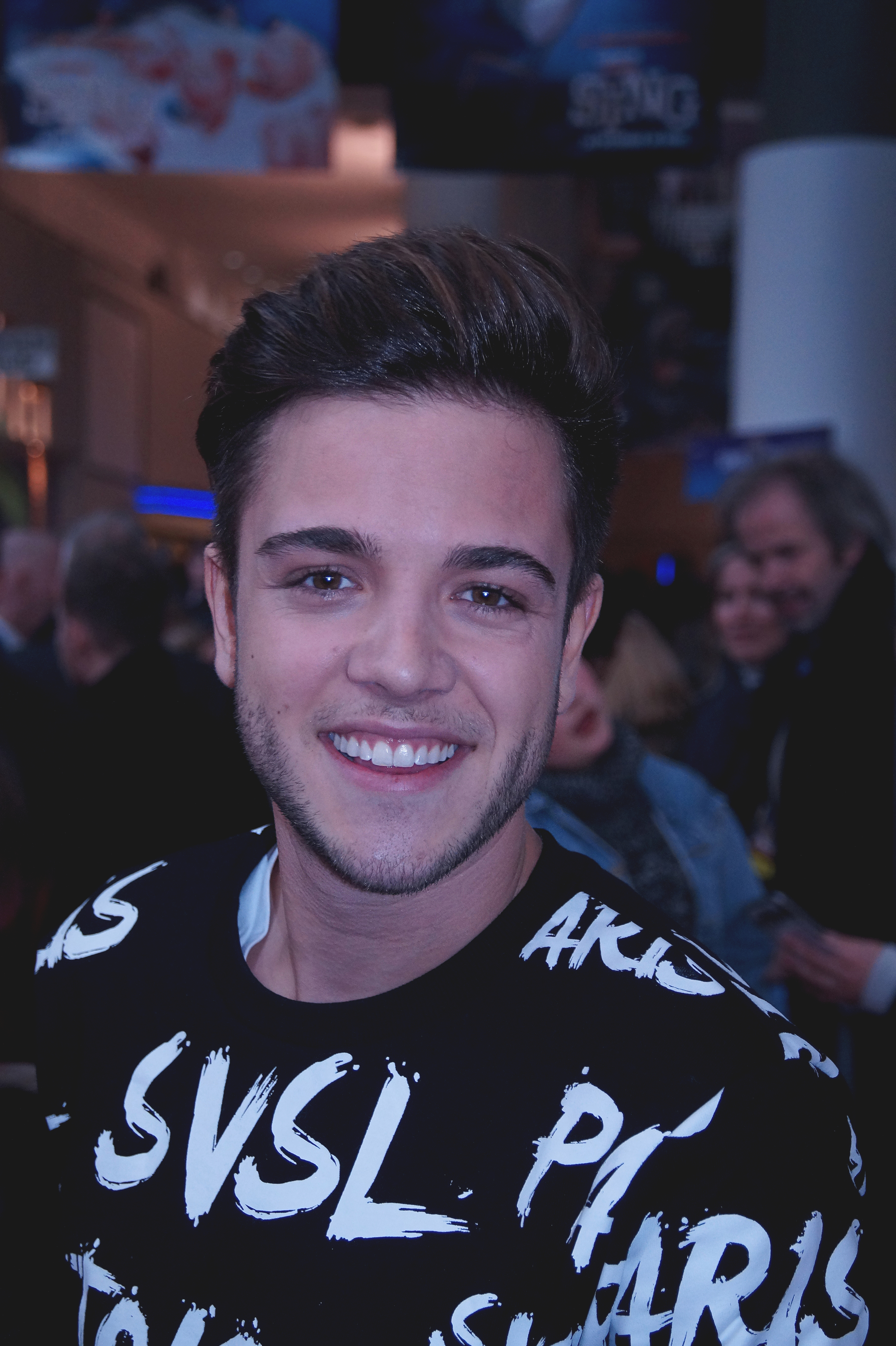
- Hänni in 2016.
- Studio albums: 5
- Singles: 16
- Music videos: 13

The discography of Luca Hänni, a Swiss singer-songwriter and model. My Name Is Luca, Hänni's debut studio album, was released in May 2012. The album peaked at number one on the Swiss Albums Chart and includes the singles "Don't Think About Me" and "I Will Die for You". Living the Dream, Hänni's second studio album, was released in April 2013. The album peaked at number one on the Swiss Albums Chart and includes the single "Shameless". Dance Until We Die, Hänni's third studio album, was released in April 2014. The album peaked at number six on the Swiss Albums Chart and includes the singles "I Can't Get No Sleep" and "Good Time". When We Wake Up, Hänni's fourth studio album, was released in September 2015. The album peaked at number six on the Swiss Albums Chart and includes the singles "Set the World on Fire" and "Wonderful". 110 Karat, fifth studio album, was released in October 2020. The album peaked at number 2 on the Swiss Albums Chart and includes the singles "Powder", "Signs", "She Got Me", "Bella Bella", "Nebenbei", "Nie mehr allein" and "Diamant".

== Albums ==
Title	Details	Peak chart positions			Certifications
Title	Details	SWI	AUT	GER	Certifications
My Name Is Luca	Release: 18 May 2012; Label: Universal; Formats: CD, digital download	1	1	2	IFPI SWI: Gold; IFPI AUT: Gold
Living the Dream	Release: 19 April 2013; Label: Universal; Formats: CD, digital download	1	8	17	
Dance Until We Die (with Christopher S)	Release: 11 April 2014; Label: Future Soundz; Formats: CD, digital download	6	38	51	
When We Wake Up	Release: 18 September 2015; Label: Muve Recordings; Formats: CD, digital download	6	47	81	
110 Karat	Release: 9 October 2020; Label: Muve Recordings; Formats: CD, digital download	2	—	74	
"—" denotes a recording that did not chart or was not released in that territory.

== Extended plays ==
Title	Details
Live	Release: 23 December 2020; Label: Muve Recordings; Formats: Digital download
Herz durch die Wand	Release: 17 December 2021; Label: Muve Recordings; Formats: Digital download

== Singles ==
=== As lead artist ===
Title	Year	Peak chart positions										Certifications	Album or EP
Title	Year	SWI	AUT	BEL (FL) Tip	GER	IRE	NLD	NOR	SPA	SWE	UK Down.	Certifications	Album or EP
"Don't Think About Me"	2012	1	1	—	1	—	—	—	—	—	—	IFPI SWI: Gold	My Name Is Luca
"I Will Die for You"	2012	37	46	—	54	—	—	—	—	—	—		My Name Is Luca
"Shameless"	2013	25	46	—	49	—	—	—	—	—	—		Living the Dream
"I Can't Get No Sleep" (with Christopher S)	2014	24	—	—	—	—	—	—	—	—	—		Dance Until We Die
"Good Time" (with Christopher S)	2014	28	—	—	—	—	—	—	—	—	—		Dance Until We Die
"Only One You"	2014	56	—	—	—	—	—	—	—	—	—		Non-album single
"Set the World on Fire"	2015	35	—	—	—	—	—	—	—	—	—		When We Wake Up
"Wonderful"	2015	58	—	—	—	—	—	—	—	—	—		When We Wake Up
"Powder"	2017	29	—	—	—	—	—	—	—	—	—		110 Karat
"Signs"	2018	53	—	—	—	—	—	—	—	—	—		110 Karat
"She Got Me"	2019	1	26	20	62	77	47	38	65	35	32	IFPI SWI: Platinum	110 Karat
"Bella Bella"	2019	45	—	—	—	—	—	—	—	—	—		110 Karat
"Nebenbei"	2019	64	—	—	—	—	—	—	—	—	—		110 Karat
"Nie mehr allein"	2020	—	—	—	—	—	—	—	—	—	—		110 Karat
"Diamant"	2020	65	—	—	—	—	—	—	—	—	—		110 Karat
"Wo warst du"	2021	—	—	—	—	—	—	—	—	—	—		Non-album singles
"Durch die Nacht" (with Sunlike Brothers)	2021	—	—	—	—	—	—	—	—	—	—		Non-album singles
"Dynamit"	2021	—	—	—	—	—	—	—	—	—	—		Non-album singles
"There for You"	2021	—	—	—	—	—	—	—	—	—	—		Non-album singles
"Just You and Me"	2021	—	—	—	—	—	—	—	—	—	—		Non-album singles
"You Broke Me First"	2021	—	—	—	—	—	—	—	—	—	—		Non-album singles
"Warum musstest du gehen"	2022	—	—	—	—	—	—	—	—	—	—		Non-album singles
"Millionär"	2022	—	—	—	—	—	—	—	—	—	—		Non-album singles
"Ma Bonita" (with Sarah Engels)	2022	—	—	—	—	—	—	—	—	—	—		Non-album singles
"Clouds"	2022	—	—	—	—	—	—	—	—	—	—		Non-album singles
"Trompete"	2023	—	—	—	—	—	—	—	—	—	—		Non-album singles
"Salsa ganze Nacht"	2023	—	—	—	—	—	—	—	—	—	—		Non-album singles
"Not Everyone's Darling" (with Patricia Kelly)	2023	—	—	—	—	—	—	—	—	—	—		Non-album singles
"Fire" (with Sunlike Brother)	2023	—	—	—	—	—	—	—	—	—	—		Non-album singles
"Stay With Me" (with Chiara Castelli)	2024	—	—	—	—	—	—	—	—	—	—		Non-album singles
"Zeilen für dich"	2024	—	—	—	—	—	—	—	—	—	—		Non-album singles
"Love Me Better"	2024	—	—	—	—	—	—	—	—	—	—		Non-album singles
"Since We Met"	2025	—	—	—	—	—	—	—	—	—	—		Non-album singles
"Love Is a Lie"	2025	— (Note: "Love Is a Lie" did not enter the Swiss Singles Chart, but peaked at number 29 on the Swiss Airplay Charts.)	—	—	—	—	—	—	—	—	—		Non-album singles
"Irresistible"	2025	—	—	—	—	—	—	—	—	—	—		Non-album singles
"Lighthouse"	2025	—	—	—	—	—	—	—	—	—	—		Non-album singles
"These Walls"	2026	—	—	—	—	—	—	—	—	—	—		Non-album singles
"Wildfire"	2026	—	—	—	—	—	—	—	—	—	—		Non-album singles
"—" denotes a recording that did not chart or was not released in that territory.

=== Promotional singles ===
Title	Year	Album
"WARUM!"	2016	Non-album singles
"Bei mir"	2018	Non-album singles

== Other charted songs ==
Title	Year	Peak chart positions	Album
Title	Year	SWI	Album
"The A Team"	2012	44	My Name Is Luca
"Allein Allein"	2012	55	My Name Is Luca

== Music videos ==
Title	Year	Director
"Don't Think About Me"	2012	
"I Will Die for You"	2012	
"Shameless"	2013	
"I Can't Get No Sleep"	2014	
"Good Time"	2014	
"Only One You"	2014	
"Wonderful"	2015	
"Powder"	2017	Oliver Sommer
"Signs"	2018	Nader Ait-Laouad
"She Got Me"	2019	India Rischko
"Bella Bella"	2019	India Rischko
"Nie mehr allein"	2020	India Rischko, David Lei Brandt
"Diamant"	2020	India Rischko
