= Laurell (singer) =

Canadian singer and songwriter

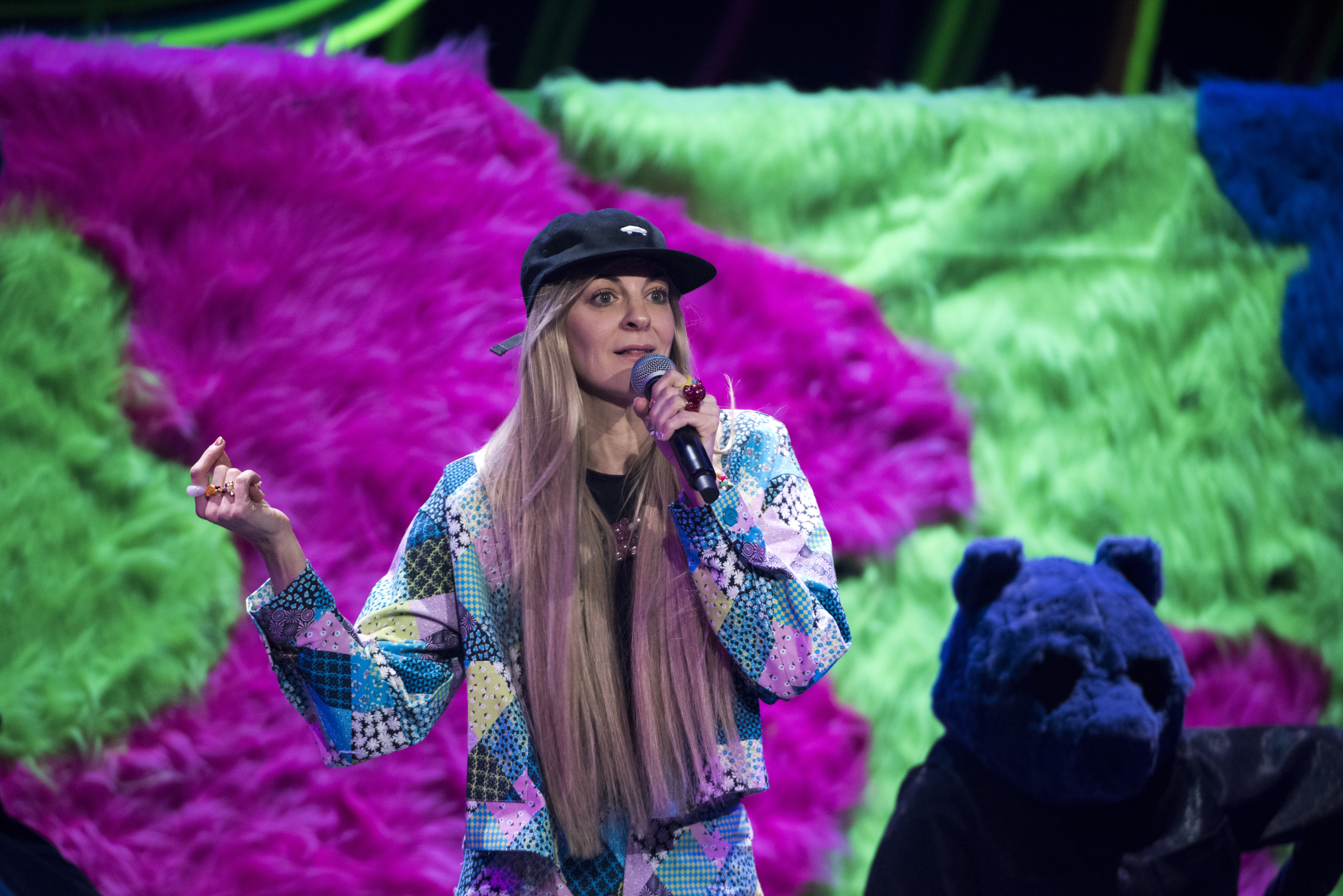
- Laurell in 2023

Background information
- Born: Laurell Barker; April 20, 1979 (age 47); North Vancouver, British Columbia, Canada
- Genre: Pop
- Occupations: Singer; songwriter
- Years active: 2015–present
- Website: laurellmusic.com

Laurell Barker (born April 20, 1979), also known mononymously as Laurell, is a Canadian singer and songwriter currently residing in Malmö, Sweden. She has co-written songs with numerous artists, including Twice, Eleni Foureira and Oh My Girl. She is also known for co-writing songs competing in the Eurovision Song Contest and its national selections.

She won a Juno Award in 2018 for Dance Recording of the Year. In 2019, Barker was the first female songwriter to have three songs competing in a Eurovision final.

== Discography ==
=== As main artist ===
Title	Year	Peak chart positions			Album
Title	Year	SWE	GER	AUT	Album
"Habit"	2021	—	31	31	Non-album single
"Get Loud"	2021	—	—	—	Cookie Jar
"Sober"	2023	85	—	—	Non-album single

=== As featured artist ===
Title	Year	Artist	Album
"Good Thing"	2017	Tritonal	Non-album single
"Good Vibes"	2017	Quintino	Bright Nights
"Hide"	2017	Matt Fax	Contrast
"Perfect Mess"	2017	Steve Void and Navarra	Non-album singles
"Call Me"	2017	Tritonal	Non-album singles
"True Love"	2018	Sondr	Non-album singles
"Get Over It"	2018	Sophie Francis	Non-album singles
"Change My Heart"	2018	Ummet Ozcan	Non-album singles
"About You"	2018	Tyron Hapi	Non-album singles
"Sweat"	2018	DJ Assad	Non-album singles
"After Midnight"	2018	LNY TNZ and Mann	Non-album singles
"Closer"	2018	Nick Fiorucci	Non-album singles
"Come and Go"	2019	Flight School	Non-album singles
"Slow"	2020	Unknown Brain, Steve Andreas and Haj	Non-album singles
"Chocolat"	2020	Foothills	Non-album singles

== Songwriting discography ==
Title	Year	Artist	Album	Co-written with
"Ghosts"	2015	Charlie Storwick	Non-album single	Charlie Storwick, Ian Prince, Dave Corman
"Stop and Stare"	2018	Letters from Pluto	Non-album single	Ian Prince, Kristina Torrieri
"Rough Cut"	2018	Cassie Dasilva	Non-album single	Cassie Dasilva, Ryan Stewart
"Kissing Tree"	2018	Ainsley Elisa	Non-album single	Ryan Stewart, Jocelyn Alice
"On My Own"	2018	Claire Richards	My Wildest Dreams	Oliver Jacobs, Aidan Martin, Ricardo Hindes
"Between You and Me" (with Louisa)	2018	One Bit	Non-album single	One Bit, Stevie Appleton
"Lil' Touch" (몰랐니)	2018	Oh!GG	Non-album single	Rachael Kennedy, Nathalia Marshall, Lance Shipp, Choi Ji-Yeon, Odal Park
"Money Ca$h"	2019	Laurence Nerbonne	FEU	Laurence Nerbonne
"Maria"	2019	Eleni Foureira	Gypsy Woman	Claydee, Emy Perez, Eleni Foureira
"Barcelona"	2019	Eleni Foureira	Gypsy Woman	Claydee, Tim Aeby, Sarah Haba
"Going On" (featuring Soran)	2019	Henri PFR	Non-album single	Duncan Laurence, Henri Peiffer, Kiris Houston, Soran Dussaigne
"Love Me Wrong"	2020	Isak Danielson	Remember to Remember Me	Isak Danielson, Ken Berglund
"살짝 설렜어 (Nonstop)"	2020	Oh My Girl	Nonstop	Steven Lee, Andreas Stone Johansson, Sebastian Thott, Seo Ji-eum, Mimi
"Bella Bella"	2020	Luca Hänni	110 Karat	Frazer Mac, Jon Hällgren, Lukas Hällgren, Pele Loriano
"Oči meduze"	2020	Andrija Jo	Non-album single	Jimmy Jansson, Palle Hammarlund
"Bring It Back"	2020	Twice	Eyes Wide Open	Earattack, Gong Do, Katya Edwards
"Popcorn"	2021	Lightsum	Non-album single	Steven Lee, Andreas Stone Johansson, Joe Lawrence
"Shout It Out"	2022	Kara	Move Again	Steven Lee, Joe Lawrence

=== Eurovision Song Contest entries ===
Year	Country	Song	Artist	Co-written with	Final	Points	Semi	Points
2018	Switzerland	"Stones"	Zibbz	Corinne Gfeller, Stee Gfeller	Failed to qualify		13	86
2019	Germany	"Sister"	Sisters	Marine Kaltenbacher, Tom Oehler, Thomas Stengaard	25	24	Member of the "Big 5"	
2019	Switzerland	"She Got Me"	Luca Hänni	Frazer Mac, Luca Hänni, Jon Hällgren, Lukas Hällgren	4	364	4	232
2019	United Kingdom	"Bigger than Us"	Michael Rice	Anna-Klara Folin, John Lundvik, Jonas Thander	26	11	Member of the "Big 5"	
2020	Poland	"Empires"	Alicja	Patryk Kumór, Dominic Buczkowski-Wojtaszek, Frazer Mac	Contest cancelled (Note: The 2020 contest was cancelled due to the COVID-19 pandemic.)			
2021	Cyprus	"El Diablo"	Elena Tsagrinou	Jimmy "Joker" Thörnfeldt, Oxa, Thomas Stengaard	16	94	6	170

==== National final entries ====
===== Eurovision: You Decide entries (United Kingdom) =====
Year	Artist	Title	Co-written with	Result
2017	Holly Brewer	"I Wish I Loved You More"	Kevin Fisher, Courtney Harrell, Mattias Frändå, Johan Åsgärde, Oliver Lundström	Final
2017	Olivia Garcia	"Freedom Hearts"	Gabriel Alares, Sebastian Lestapier, Linnea Nelson	Final
2018	Asanda Jezile	"Legends"	Christopher Wortley, Roel Rats	Final
2019	Michael Rice	"Bigger than Us"	Anna-Klara Folin, John Lundvik, Jonas Thander	1st

===== Melodifestivalen entries (Sweden) =====
Year	Artist	Title	Co-written with	Result
2018	Renaida	"All the Feels"	Jon Hällgren, Peter Barringer, Lukas Hällgren	9th
2019	Margaret	"Tempo"	Anderz Wrethov, Jimmy Jansson, Sebastian von Koenigsegg	5th (Heat)
2020	Ellen Benediktson and Simon Peyron	"Surface"	Paul Rey, Anderz Wrethov, Sebastian von Koenigsegg, Ellen Benediktson	Second Chance
2020	Hanna Ferm	"Brave"	David Kjellstrand, Jimmy Jansson	4th
2021	Nathalie Brydolf	"Fingerprints"	Andreas Stone Johansson, Etta Zelmani, Anna-Klara Folin	7th (Heat)
2021	Paul Rey	"The Missing Piece"	Fredrik Sonefors, Paul Rey	12th
2022	Faith Kakembo	"Freedom"	Anderz Wrethov, Palle Hammarlund, Faith Kakembo	10th
2023	Laurell	"Sober"	Anderz Wrethov, Andreas Stone Johansson, Thomas Stengaard	5th (Heat)
2023	Maria Sur	"Never Give Up"	Anderz Wrethov	9th
2025	Andreas Lundstedt	"Vicious"	Andreas Lundstedt, Dino Medanhodzic, Liam Cacatian Thomassen	3rd (Heat)
2025	Meira Omar	"Hush Hush"	Anderz Wrethov, Dino Medanhodzic, Meira Omar	10th
2026	Indra	"Beautiful Lie"	Anderz Wrethov, Indra Elg, Kristofer Strandberg, Robert Skowronski	3rd (Heat)
2026	Meira Omar	"Dooset Daram"	Anderz Wrethov, Jimmy "Joker" Thörnfeldt, Meira Omar	9th

===== Die Grosse Entscheidungsshow entries (Switzerland) =====
Year	Artist	Title	Co-written with	Result
2018	Alejandro Reyes	"Compass"	Alejandro Reyes, Lars Christen	2nd
2018	Zibbz	"Stones"	Corinne Gfeller, Stee Gfeller	1st

===== Eurovizijos Atranka entries (Lithuania) =====
Year	Artist	Title	Co-written with	Result
2018	Mia	"Arrows"	Rickard Bonde Truumeel, Greig Watts	7th (Heat)
2019	Gabrielė Rybko	"Lay It Down"	Georgie Dennis, Cameron Warren	9th (Heat)

===== Dansk Melodi Grand Prix entries (Denmark) =====
Year	Artist	Title	Co-written with	Result
2019	Leeloo	"That Vibe"	Ludvig Hilarius Brygmann, Maria Marcus	Out (Final)

===== National final entry (Germany) =====
Year	Artist	Title	Co-written with	Result
2019	S!sters	"Sister"	Marine Kaltenbacher, Tom Oehler, Thomas Stengaard	1st

===== Melodi Grand Prix entries (Norway) =====
Year	Artist	Title	Co-written with	Result
2019	Carina Dahl	"Hold Me Down"	Ashley Hicklin, Jeroen Swinnen, Pele Loriano, Laura Groeseneken	Eliminated (Final)
2020	Lisa Børud	"Talking About Us"	Jimmy Jansson, Anderz Wrethov, Maia Wright	Eliminated (Gold Duel in Heat)
2020	Raylee	"Wild"	Andreas Stone Johansson, Anderz Wrethov	3rd/4th place (Gold Final)
2021	Raylee	"Hero"	Andreas Stone Johansson, Anderz Wrethov, Thomas Stengaard, Frazer Mac	Eliminated (Final)

===== Beovizija entry (Serbia) =====
Year	Artist	Title	Co-written with	Result
2020	Andrija Jo	"Oči meduze"	Jimmy Jansson, Palle Hammarlund, Andrijano Ajzi	4th (Final)

===== Dora entry (Croatia) =====
Year	Artist	Title	Co-written with	Result
2022	Mia Negovetić	"Forgive Me (Oprosti)"	Andreas Stone Johansson, Denniz Jamm, Mia Negovetić	3rd

===== Eurosong entry (Belgium) =====
Year	Artist	Title	Co-written with	Result
2023	The Starlings	"Rollercoaster"	Kato Callebaut, Tom Eeckhout, Thomas Stengaard, Andreas Stone Johansson, Anderz Wrethov, Anna Grey	2nd

=== Junior Eurovision Song Contest entries ===
Year	Country	Song	Artist	Co-written with	Place	Points
2026	Cyprus	"Who I Can Be"	Harry Georgiou	Anna-Klara Folin, Nathalie Brydolf, Thomas Stengaard, Victoria Chalkitis	TBD 24 October 2026	
