= Switzerland in the Eurovision Song Contest 2020 =

- Eurovision Song Contest 2020
- Participating broadcaster: Swiss Broadcasting Corporation (SRG SSR)
- Country: Switzerland
- Selection process: Internal selection
- Announcement date: 4 March 2020

Competing entry
- Song: "Répondez-moi"
- Artist: Gjon's Tears
- Songwriters: Gjon Muharremaj; Xavier Michel; Alizé Oswald; Jeroen Swinnen

Placement
- Final result: Contest cancelled

Participation chronology

Switzerland was set to be represented at the Eurovision Song Contest 2020 with the song "Répondez-moi", written by Gjon Muharremaj, Xavier Michel, Alizé Oswald, and Jeroen Swinnen, and performed by Muharremaj himself under his stage name Gjon's Tears. The song was internally selected by the Swiss broadcaster Swiss Broadcasting Corporation (SRG SSR) to represent the nation at the 2020 contest in Rotterdam, Netherlands. "Répondez-moi" was presented to the public on 4 March 2020.

Switzerland was drawn to compete in the second semi-final of the Eurovision Song Contest which took place on 14 May 2020. However, the contest was cancelled due to the COVID-19 pandemic.

== Background ==
Prior to the 2020 contest, Switzerland had participated in the Eurovision Song Contest sixty times since its first entry in 1956. Switzerland is noted for having won the first edition of the Eurovision Song Contest with the song "Refrain" performed by Lys Assia. Their second victory was achieved in 1988 when Canadian singer Céline Dion won the contest with the song "Ne partez pas sans moi". Following the introduction of semi-finals for the 2004, Switzerland had managed to participate in the final four times up to this point. In 2005, the internal selection of Estonian girl band Vanilla Ninja, performing the song "Cool Vibes", qualified Switzerland to the final where they placed 8th. Due to their successful result in 2005, Switzerland was pre-qualified to compete directly in the final in 2006. Between 2007 and 2010, the nation failed to qualify to the final after a string of internal selections. Opting to organize a national final between 2011 and 2018, Switzerland has managed to qualify to the final twice out of the last eight years. In 2019, Switzerland returned to an internal selection and earned their highest result in the contest since 2014, qualifying to the final and placing 4th with the song "She Got Me" performed by Luca Hänni.

The Swiss national broadcaster, Swiss Broadcasting Corporation (SRG SSR), broadcasts the event within Switzerland and organises the selection process for the nation's entry. SRG SSR confirmed their intentions to participate at the 2020 Eurovision Song Contest on 11 July 2019. Along with their participation confirmation, the broadcaster also announced that the Swiss entry for the 2020 contest would be selected internally. Switzerland has selected their entry for the Eurovision Song Contest through both national finals and internal selections in the past. Between 2011 and 2018, the broadcaster has opted to organize a national final in order to select their entry. In 2019, the Swiss entry was internally selected for the competition.

== Before Eurovision ==
=== Internal selection ===
SRG SSR opened a submission period between 2 September 2019 and 16 September 2019 for interested artists and composers to submit their entries. Artists and songwriters of any nationality were able to submit songs; however those with a Swiss passport or residency were given priority. Multiple songwriting camps were also held in order to create potential songs to be submitted for the selection process. 515 entries were submitted following the submission deadline. Songs shortlisted from the received submissions were then tested by their music producers with various artists and the combination of a 100-member public panel (50%) and the votes of a 21-member international expert jury (50%) selected the Swiss entry. The members of the public panel were Swiss residents put together according to selected criteria in cooperation with Digame, while the international jury consisted of members who had been national juries for their respective countries at the Eurovision Song Contest.

Members of the International Jury
Name	Country	Profession
Argyro Christodoulidou	Cyprus	Composer, songwriter
Maria Marcus	Sweden	Music producer, songwriter
Florent Luyckx	Netherlands	Radio executive
Pete Watsons	United Kingdom	Keyboardist
Jennifer O'Brien	Ireland	Music and entertainment journalist
Leonid Shirin	Belarus	Composer
Sasha Saedi	Austria	Music manager
Alexey Gross	Belarus	Singer
Adrienn Zsédenyi	Hungary	Singer, actress, author, producer, mentor, social worker
Anders Øhrstrøm	Denmark	Singer, composer, music producer, sound designer, vocal coach
Deivydas Zvonkus	Lithuania	Composer, producer
Tinkara Kovač	Slovenia	Singer, flautist, represented Slovenia in the 2014 contest
Grzegorz Urban	Poland	Composer, arranger, pianist
Ovidiu Jacobsen	Romania	Songwriter, musician, producer, represented Romania in the 2010 and 2014 contests
Helga Möller	Iceland	Singer, represented Iceland in the 1986 contest as member of ICY
Gore Melian	Armenia	Singer, songwriter, producer
Rafailas Karpis	Lithuania	Opera singer
Ruth Lorenzo	Spain	Singer, songwriter, represented Spain in the 2014 contest
Gordon Groothedde	Netherlands	Composer, producer
Einar Bardarson	Iceland	Composer, music producer, concertist, artist agent
Henrik Johnsson	Sweden	Television presenter and producer

On 4 March 2020, "Répondez-moi" performed by Gjon's Tears was announced as the Swiss entry for the Eurovision Song Contest 2020. Gjon's Tears had previously participated in and placed third in the first season of the Albanian talent show competition Albanians Got Talent. He later participated in the second season of the Swiss talent show competition Die grössten Schweizer Talente and the eighth season of the French reality singing competition The Voice : la plus belle voix where he both qualified to the semi-finals. The official music video of the song, directed by Janine Piguet, was presented to the public on the same day via the official Eurovision Song Contest's YouTube channel. "Répondez-moi" was written by Gjon's Tears together with Xavier Michel, Alizé Oswald and Jeroen Swinnen.

== At Eurovision ==
According to Eurovision rules, all nations with the exceptions of the host country and the "Big Five" (France, Germany, Italy, Spain and the United Kingdom) are required to qualify from one of two semi-finals in order to compete for the final; the top ten countries from each semi-final progress to the final. The European Broadcasting Union (EBU) split up the competing countries into six different pots based on voting patterns from previous contests, with countries with favourable voting histories put into the same pot. On 28 January 2020, a special allocation draw was held which placed each country into one of the two semi-finals, as well as which half of the show they would perform in. Switzerland was placed into the second semi-final, to be held on 14 May 2020, and was scheduled to perform in the second half of the show. However, due to the COVID-19 pandemic, the contest was cancelled.

Prior to the Eurovision Song Celebration YouTube broadcast in place of the semi-finals, it was revealed that Switzerland was set to perform in position 10, following the entry from Iceland and before the entry from Denmark.
