= Gjon's Tears =

Swiss singer and songwriter (born 1998)

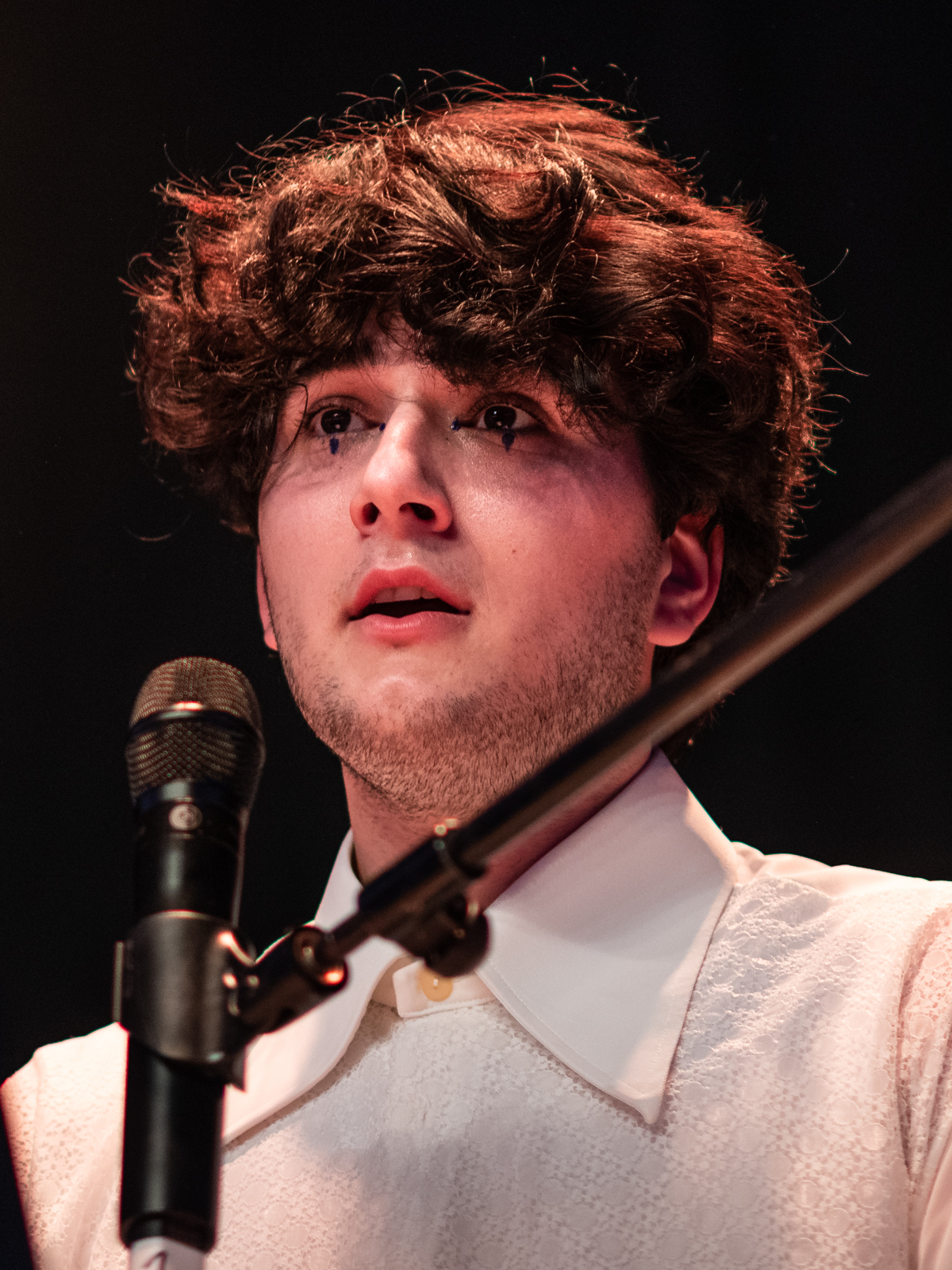
- Muharremaj in 2022

Background information
- Also known as: Gjon's Tears
- Born: Gjon Muharremaj; 29 June 1998 (age 28); Saanen, Bern, Switzerland
- Origin: Broc, Switzerland
- Genre: Pop
- Occupations: Singer; Songwriter
- Instruments: Piano, Classical guitar
- Years active: 2011–present
- Labels: Nvak Collective, Jo & Co
- Member of: Gjon's Tears and the Weeping Willows

Gjon Muharremaj (Albanian: [ɟɔn muhaˈrɛmaj]; born 29 June 1998), known professionally as Gjon's Tears, is a Swiss singer and songwriter. He was scheduled to represent Switzerland in the Eurovision Song Contest 2020 with the song "Répondez-moi" prior to the event's cancellation. He was internally selected again as the country's representative for the 2021 contest with "Tout l'univers". He finished in third place with 432 points, at the time the best placing for Switzerland since 1993.

== Life and career ==
=== 1998–2019: Early life and career beginnings ===
Muharremaj was born in Saanen, Bern, Switzerland to a Kosovo Albanian father from Gjinoc, part of Suharekë municipality in Kosovo, and an Albanian mother from Tirana, Albania. His father, Hysni, is a crane operator and mason. His mother, Elda, has worked in the Cailler chocolate factory after the family moved to Broc in 2000. He also has an older brother, Ardit.

He grew up in Broc, where he played football and did karate. When he was 7 years old, he discovered his passion for music during music class. Two years later he acquired his stage name after moving his grandfather to tears when he performed Elvis Presley's "Can't Help Falling in Love". In 2011, at the age of 12, he competed in the first season of the talent show Albanians Got Talent, placing third in the final. One year later, he reached the semi-final of Die grössten Schweizer Talente, the Swiss version of Got Talent.

In 2018, he started his band Gjon’s Tears and the Weeping Willows, consisting of himself and Gaëtan Guélat (drummer), Martino Lepori (guitarist), Pascal Stoll (guitarist) and Samuel Riedo (bassist).

=== 2019: The Voice: la plus belle voix ===
In 2019, he auditioned for the eighth season of the French singing competition The Voice: la plus belle voix and reached the semi-finals with Team Mika.

The Voice: la plus belle voix performances and results
Round	Song	Original artist(s)	Result
Blind Audition	"Christine"	Christine and the Queens	Joined Team Mika
The Battles	"Don't Let the Sun Go Down on Me"	Elton John & George Michael	Winner
The Knockouts	"Under Pressure"	Queen & David Bowie	Advanced
Live Show 1	"SOS d'un terrien en détresse"	Daniel Balavoine	Advanced
Live Show 2	"Rocket Man"	Elton John	Advanced
Semi-Final	"Relax, Take It Easy"	Mika	Eliminated
Semi-Final	"Life on Mars"	David Bowie	Eliminated

In the summer of 2019, the band performed at Swiss music festivals following Gjon’s The Voice participation, including the Montreux Jazz Festival, Les Georges, and Les Francomanias.

=== 2020–2022: Eurovision Song Contest ===
In March 2020, Gjon's Tears was announced by the Swiss national broadcaster, Swiss Broadcasting Corporation (SRG SSR), as the country's representative at the Eurovision Song Contest 2020 with the song "Répondez-moi". However, following the contest's cancellation due to the COVID-19 pandemic in Europe, the broadcaster announced that he would represent the country at the Eurovision Song Contest 2021 with a new song. His 2021 entry, "Tout l'univers" was released on 10 March 2021. "Tout l'univers" placed first in its semi-final. In the final, it won the jury vote and came sixth in the televote. Switzerland placed third overall, behind France and eventual winner Italy. Gjon's Tears, along with the song's producers, won the Composer Award in the 2021 edition of the Marcel Bezençon Awards, voted on by a panel of participating composers in the 2021 contest. In 2021, he gave an interview for Vanity Teen magazine, talking about his success, the origin of his stage name and his result in the Eurovision Song Contest.

In late 2021, he participated in The Voice All Stars France, but was eliminated in the semi-final.

The Voice All-Stars performances and results
Round	Song	Original artist(s)	Result
Blind Audition	"Corps"	Yseult	Joined Team Zazie
Cross-Battle	"Smalltown Boy"	Bronski Beat	Advanced
Semi-Final	"Sur un prélude de Bach"	Maurane	Eliminated

In November 2021, Muharremaj was announced as Best Swiss Act at the MTV Europe Music Awards in Budapest. In March 2022, he moved from Switzerland to Paris, but moved back to Switzerland in May 2024 and became an independent artist, after parting ways with his Paris-based label, Jo & Co.

In March 2022, he was one of the 10 juries for the French national final for the Eurovision Song Contest 2022, called; Eurovision France: C’est vous qui décidez!”.

He released his sixth single, "Pure" on 28 October 2022, with the music video being released the following month. This music video includes 11 art-inspired scenes and a short appearance of Geraldine Chaplin.

=== 2023–present: The Game ===
His debut album The Game was released on 28 April 2023.

Gjon was present at the Eurovision Song Contest 2025 in Basel, performing his 2020 Eurovision entry "Répondez-moi" as a part of the interval act in the second semi-final of the 2025 contest, alongside other 2020 contestants Destiny Chukunyere, the Roop, and Samira Efendi, who also performed their respective songs of 2020. Additionally, Gjon also performed his 2021 entry "Tout l'univers" as a part of the interval act in the final, alongside other previous Swiss representatives Luca Hänni, Paola and Peter, Sue and Marc.

== Discography ==
=== Studio albums ===
Title	Details	Peak chart positions
Title	Details	SWI
The Game	Released: 28 April 2023; Label: Jo & Co	11

=== Singles ===
==== As lead artist ====
List of singles as lead artist, with selected chart positions, showing year released and album name
Title	Year	Peak chart positions										Album or EP
Title	Year	SWI	ALB	BEL (FL)	FIN	GER	IRE	NLD	NOR	SWE	UK	Album or EP
"Babi"	2018	—	1	—	—	—	—	—	—	—	—	The Game
"Back in Light"	2018	—	—	—	—	—	—	—	—	—	—	Non-album singles
"Répondez-moi"	2020	42	—	—	—	—	—	—	—	—	—	Non-album singles
"Tout l'univers"	2021	1	—	50	5	86	52	16	36	21	93	The Game
"Silhouette"	2022	—	3	—	—	—	—	—	—	—	—	The Game
"Pure"	2022	—	9	—	—	—	—	—	—	—	—	The Game
"Midnight in Paris"	2023	—	5	—	—	—	—	—	—	—	—	The Game
"Disco"	2023	—	15	—	—	—	—	—	—	—	—	The Game
"Cancer" (with Ibrahim Maalouf)	2023	—	—	—	—	—	—	—	—	—	—	The Game
"Balloons" (with Bart Derylo and Szymon Justyński)	2025	—	—	—	—	—	—	—	—	—	—	Non-album singles
"Oret e fundit" (with Adelina Thaqi)	2025	—	—	—	—	—	—	—	—	—	—	Non-album singles
"Set Me Free"	2025	—	—	—	—	—	—	—	—	—	—	Non-album singles
"L'eclat de Nous" (with Philippine Lavrey)	2025	—	—	—	—	—	—	—	—	—	—	Non-album singles
"Où est mon amour"	2025	—	—	—	—	—	—	—	—	—	—	Non-album singles
"Qui je suis"	2025	—	—	—	—	—	—	—	—	—	—	Non-album singles
"—" denotes a recording that did not chart or was not released in that territory.

==== As featured artist ====
List of singles as featured artist, with selected chart positions, showing year released and album name
Title	Year	Peak chart positions	Album
Title	Year	ALB	Album
"Dance Me" (Arilena Ara featuring Gjon's Tears)	2021	10	Pop Art
"Heavenbound" (Marina Kaye featuring Gjon's Tears; French Version)	2023	—	Non-album singles
"—" denotes a recording that did not chart or was not released in that territory.

== Awards and nominations ==
Year	Award	Nomination	Work	Result
2021	Marcel Bezençon Awards	Composer Award	"Tout l'univers"	Won
2021	MTV Europe Music Awards	Best Swiss Act	Himself	Won
2023	MTV Europe Music Awards	Best Swiss Act	Himself	Won

Awards and achievements
Preceded by Luca Hänni with "She Got Me"	Switzerland in the Eurovision Song Contest; 2020 (cancelled)	Succeeded by Himself with "Tout l'Univers"
Preceded by Himself with "Répondez-moi"	Switzerland in the Eurovision Song Contest; 2021	Succeeded by Marius Bear with "Boys Do Cry"
