= Only One You (Luca Hänni song) =

Single by Luca Hänni
- Released: 28 November 2014
- Recorded: 2014
- Genre: Pop
- Length: 3:39
- Label: Luca Music

Luca Hänni singles chronology
"Good Time" (2014)	"Only One You" (2014)	"Set the World on Fire" (2015)

"Only One You" is a song by Swiss singer-songwriter Luca Hänni. It was released as a digital single on 28 November 2014 by Luca Music. The song peaked at number 56 on the Swiss Singles Chart.

== Music video ==
A music video to accompany the release of "Only One You" was first released onto YouTube on 28 November 2014 at a total length of four minutes and thirty-five seconds.

== Charts ==
Chart (2014)	Peak position
Switzerland (Schweizer Hitparade)	56

== Release history ==
Region	Date	Format	Label
Switzerland	28 November 2014	Digital download	Luca Music
