= Zibbz =

Swiss indie pop duo

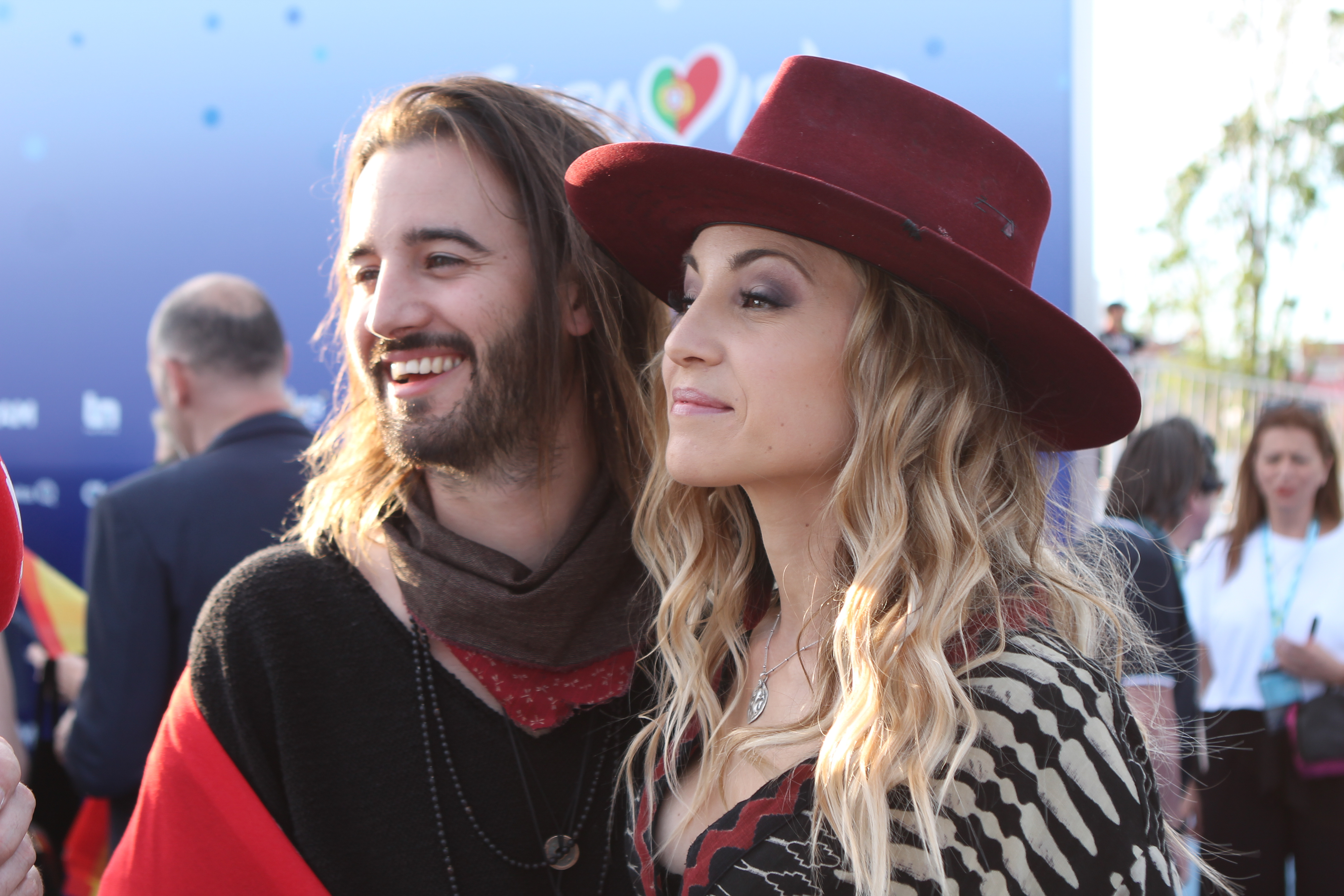
- Zibbz at the Eurovision Song Contest 2018

Background information
- Origin: Gisikon, Switzerland
- Genres: Indie pop
- Years active: 2008–present
- Members: Corinne Gfeller; Stefan Gfeller
- Website: zibbz.com

Zibbz (sometimes stylized as ZiBBZ) is a Swiss duo made of siblings Corinne and Stefan Gfeller. They represented Switzerland in the Eurovision Song Contest 2018 with the song "Stones". They are from Zürich, but are based in Los Angeles.

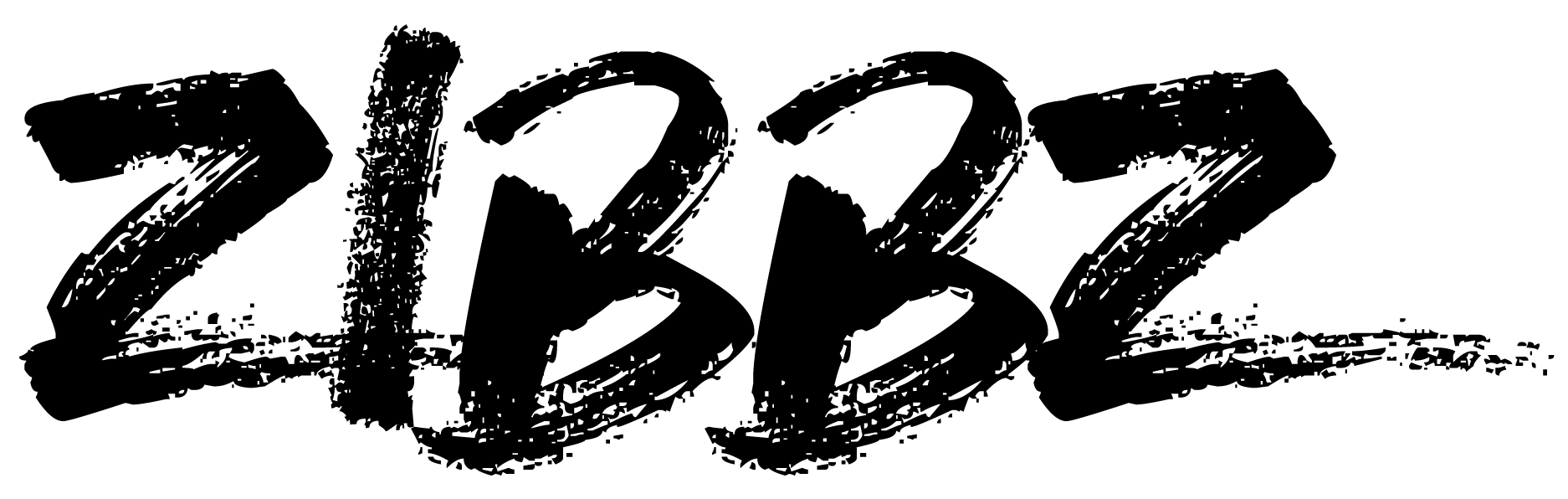

== Biography ==
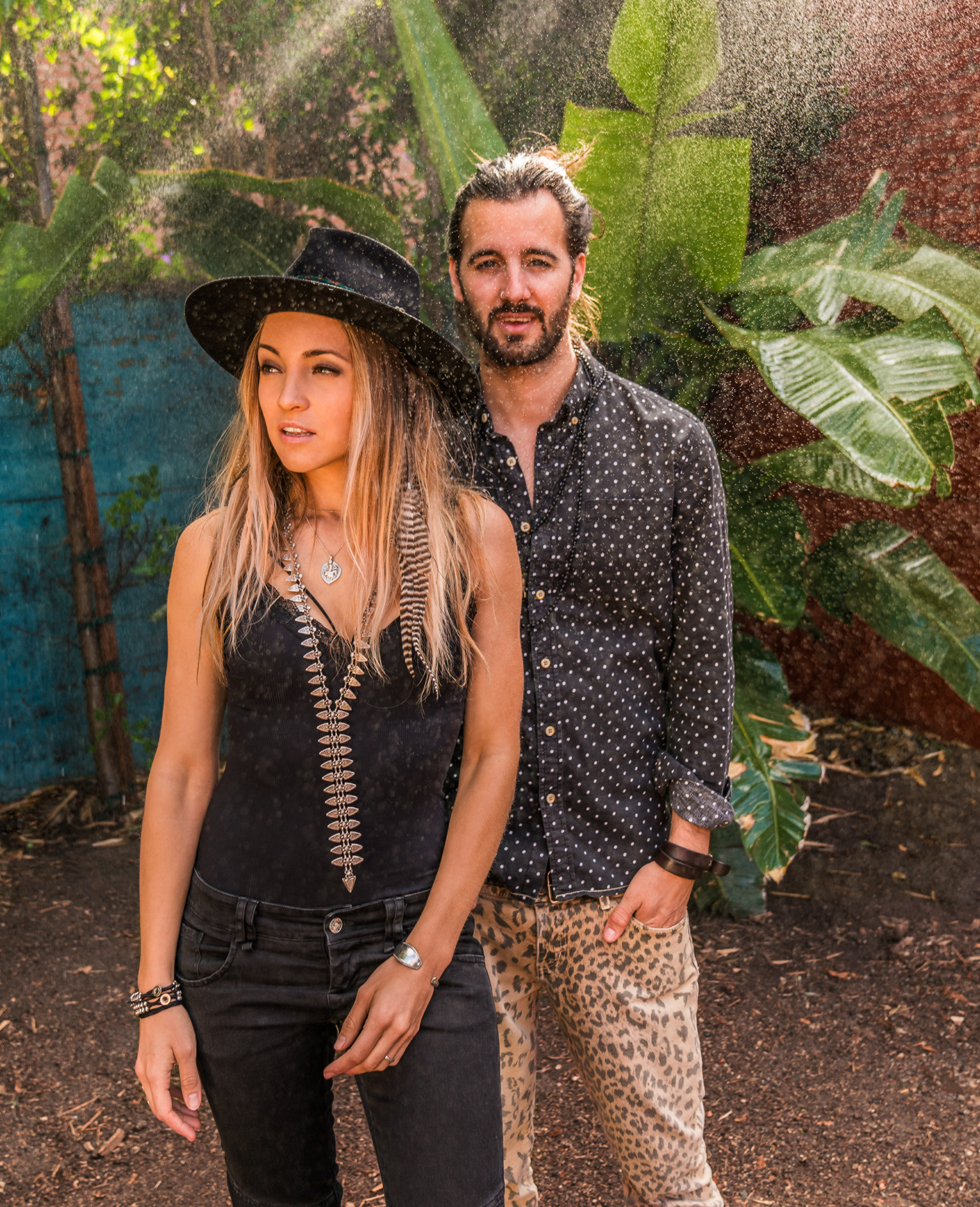
The duo shown in 2018.

Zibbz was founded in 2008 by siblings Corinne "Coco" Gfeller (vocals) and Stefan "Stee" Gfeller (drums, keyboard). The name "zibbz" is a modification of the English word "siblings".

Since 2011, Coco and Stee have split their time between Switzerland and Los Angeles. Between 2011 and 2015, the band had their own weekly reality show about their lives in Los Angeles and the road to success in the music industry on the Swiss television channel Joiz. Their first studio album Ready? Go! was released in 2013 and peaked at number-14 on the official Swiss album charts. In 2017, their second studio album It Takes a Village, which was self-produced, peaked at number-11 on the official Swiss album charts. They have created songs used in commercials for Ragusa and Subaru, and wrote the official theme song for the 2012 Men's World Floorball Championships in Zürich.

In February 2018, Zibbz was chosen to represent Switzerland with their song "Stones" at the Eurovision Song Contest 2018 in Lisbon, however, they failed to advance from the first semi-final, finishing in 13th place.

== Members ==
=== Corinne Gfeller ===
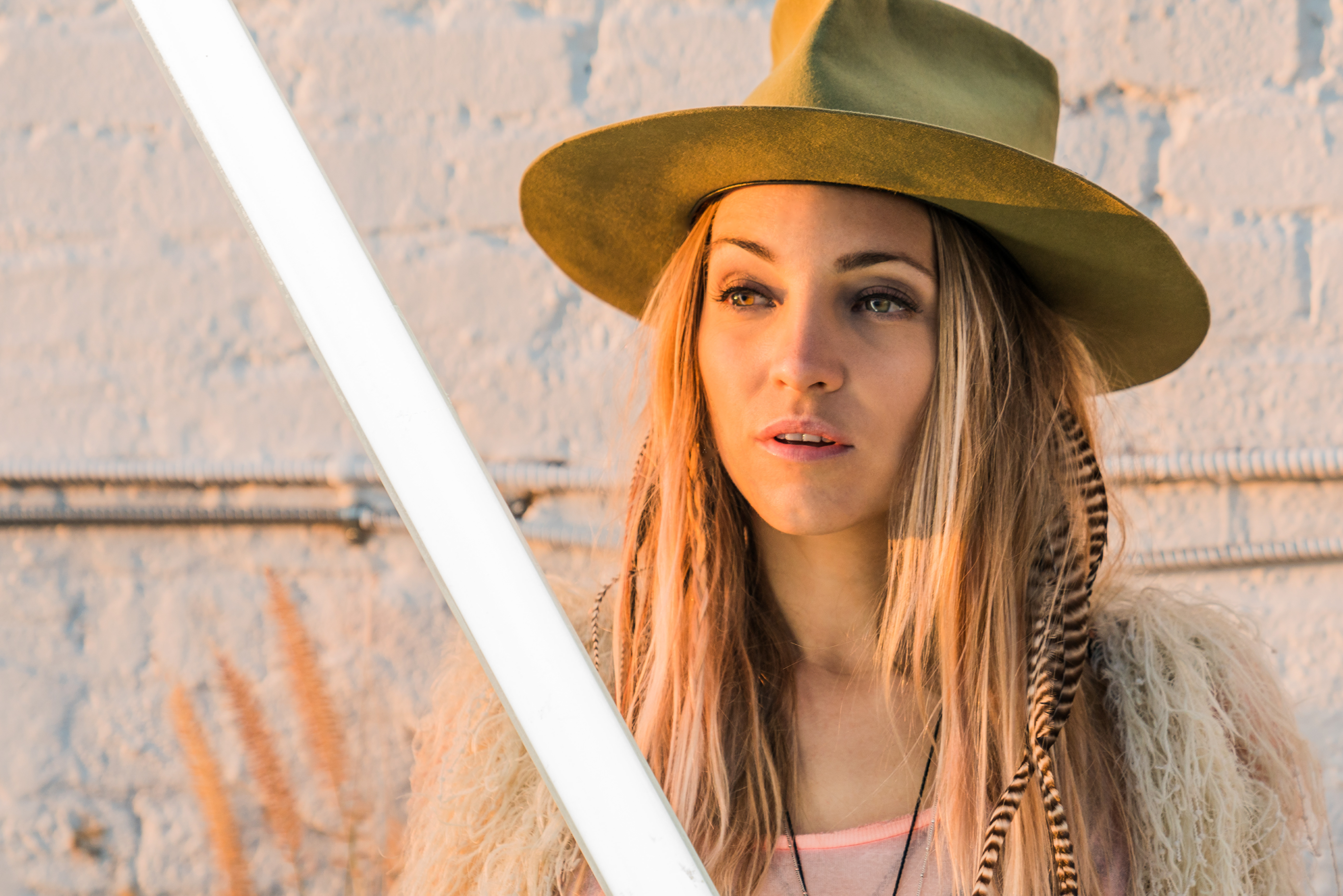
Corinne "Coco" Gfeller

Corinne "Coco" Gfeller, born 6 June 1985 (age 40), is the duo's lead vocalist. She trained at Laine Theatre Arts in London.

Gfeller has also recorded vocals for numerous artists such as Gölä, Bligg, Carlos Leal, Bastian Baker, DJ Antoine, and Bellamy Brothers. She also worked on radio jingles for RTL, FFN, SAW, Radio Munot, Radio Fribourg and has been an integral part of Swiss singer Gölä's band for more than ten years.

Gfeller has performed with multiple high-profile musicians, including Donna Summer, Prince, The Sessions Band, Thirty Seconds to Mars, LP, Marc Storace, Scott Weiland, and was the lead singer for Basel Tattoo 2010 and 2017, Art on Ice, and the European leg of the We Will Rock You: 10th Anniversary Tour by Queen. On 18 May 2019, she gave birth to her son Bowie Leon.

=== Stefan Gfeller ===
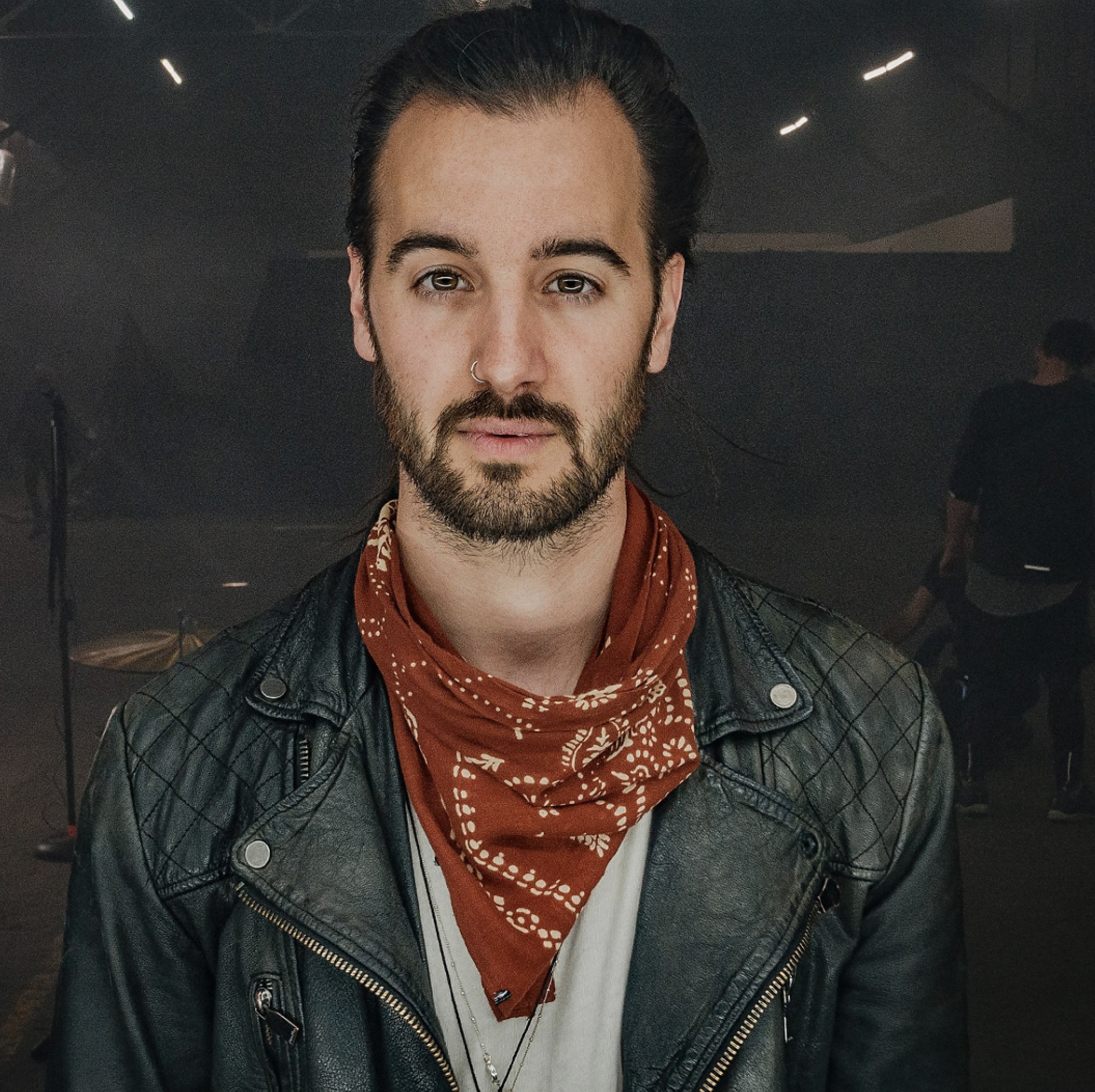
Stefan "Stee" Gfeller

Stefan "Stee" Gfeller, born 3 November 1987 (age 38), is the duo's drummer, keyboardist, and producer. From 2003 to 2007, he studied music in Winterthur where he completed his SMPV Diploma. Outside of Zibbz, Gfeller also worked as a drummer and producer for a range of different artists, including Gölä and Bastian Baker. Furthermore, Gfeller is a member of the punk drum collective Street Drum Corps.

== Discography ==
=== Albums ===
Title	Details	Peak chart positions
Title	Details	SWI
Ready? Go!	Released: 5 April 2013; Label: Phonag Records; Format: Digital download, CD	14
It Takes a Village	Released: 1 September 2017; Label: Phonag Records; Format: Digital download, CD	11

=== Singles ===
Title	Year	Peak chart positions	Album
Title	Year	SWI	Album
"Www.ahh!"	2011	—	Non-album single
"One Shot"	2012	—	Ready? Go!
"Wake Up!"	2013	—	Ready? Go!
"Neonlights"	2013	—	Ready? Go!
"Dynamite Blonde"	2014	—	Non-album single
"Undone"	2014	—	Non-album single
"Run"	2017	—	It Takes a Village
"Stones"	2018	62	Non-album single
"Rich"	2018	—	Non-album single
"Citylights"	2019	—	Non-album single
"—" denotes a single that did not chart or was not released.

Awards and achievements
Preceded by Timebelle with "Apollo"	Switzerland in the Eurovision Song Contest; 2018	Succeeded by Luca Hänni with "She Got Me"
