= I Can't Get No Sleep =

Single by Luca Hänni and Christopher S

from the album Dance Until We Die
- Released: 11 April 2014
- Recorded: 2013
- Genre: Pop
- Length: 3:44
- Label: Future Soundz
- Songwriter(s): Mathias Ramson; Michael Keller; Michel Lüchinger
- Producer(s): Michel Lüchinger

Luca Hänni singles chronology
"Shameless" (2013)	"I Can't Get No Sleep" (2014)	"Good Time" (2014)

"I Can't Get No Sleep" is a song by Swiss singer-songwriter Luca Hänni and DJ Christopher S. It was written by Mathias Ramson, Michael Keller and Michel Lüchinger and produced by the latter for Hänni's third studio album Dance Until We Die (2014). Released as the album's lead single on 11 April 2014, it peaked at number 24 on the Swiss Singles Chart.

== Music video ==
A music video to accompany the release of "I Can't Get No Sleep" was first released onto YouTube on 10 August 2014 at a total length of three minutes and forty-five seconds.

== Charts ==
Chart (2014)	Peak position
Switzerland (Schweizer Hitparade)	24

== Release history ==
Region	Date	Format	Label
Switzerland	11 April 2014	Digital download	Universal Music
