= Wonderful (Luca Hänni song) =

Single by Luca Hänni

from the album When We Wake Up
- Released: 28 August 2015
- Recorded: 2014
- Genre: Pop; country
- Length: 3:23
- Label: Muve
- Songwriter(s): Eric van Tijn; Jochem Fluitsma; Joachim Vermeulen Windsant; Maarten ten Hove; Willem Laseroms; Mark van Tijn; Ramon Marco
- Producer(s): Fabian Egger

Luca Hänni singles chronology
"Set the World on Fire" (2015)	"Wonderful" (2015)	"Powder" (2017)

"Wonderful" is a song by Swiss singer-songwriter Luca Hänni. It was written by Eric van Tijn, Jochem Fluitsma, Joachim Vermeulen Windsant, Maarten ten Hove, Willem Laseroms, Mark van Tijn and Ramon Marco for Hänni's third studio album When We Wake Up (2015), while production was overseen by Egger. It was released on 28 August 2015 by Muve Records, serving as the album's second single. The song peaked at number 58 on the Swiss Singles Chart.

== Music video ==
A music video to accompany the release of "Wonderful" was first released onto YouTube on 8 September 2015 at a total length of three minutes and thirty-five seconds.

== Track listing ==
Digital download
No.	Title	Length
1.	"Wonderful"	3:23

== Charts ==
Chart (2015)	Peak position
Switzerland (Schweizer Hitparade)	58

== Release history ==
Region	Date	Format	Label
Switzerland	28 August 2015	Digital download	Muve
