= Tout l'univers =

2021 song by Gjon's Tears

Single by Gjon's Tears

from the album The Game
- Released: 10 March 2021
- Length: 3:03
- Label: Jo & Co; Sony Music
- Songwriters: Gjon Muharremaj; Nina Sampermans; Wouter Hardy; Xavier Michel
- Producer: Wouter Hardy

Gjon's Tears singles chronology
| "Répondez-moi" (2020) | "Tout l'univers" (2021) | "Dance Me" (2021) |

Music video
- "Tout l'univers" on YouTube

Eurovision Song Contest 2021 entry
- Country: Switzerland
- Artist: Gjon's Tears
- Language: French
- Composers: Gjon Muharremaj; Nina Sampermans; Wouter Hardy; Xavier Michel
- Lyricists: Gjon Muharremaj; Nina Sampermans; Wouter Hardy; Xavier Michel

Finals performance
- Semi-final result: 1st
- Semi-final points: 291
- Final result: 3rd
- Final points: 432

Entry chronology
- ◄ "Répondez-moi" (2020)
- "Boys Do Cry" (2022) ►

"Tout l'univers" (French pronunciation: [tu lynivɛʁ]; transl. "The Whole Universe") is a song by Swiss singer Gjon's Tears released as a single on 10 March 2021 by Jo & Co and Sony Music Entertainment. It was written and composed by the singer himself alongside Nina Sampermans, Wouter Hardy and Xavier Michel. The song represented Switzerland in the Eurovision Song Contest 2021 in Rotterdam, the Netherlands, after being internally selected by the Swiss Broadcasting Corporation (SRG SSR). The song finished in 3rd place, receiving 432 points, the best result for Switzerland since 1993, until the 2024 edition when Nemo claimed victory with The Code. It also won the Composer Award in the 2021 edition of the Marcel Bezençon Awards, voted on by a panel of participating composers in the 2021 contest.

== Release and promotion ==
"Tout l'univers" was made available for digital download and streaming by Jo & Co and Sony Music on 10 March 2021. The accompanying music video premiered on the official YouTube channel of the Eurovision Song Contest simultaneously with the digital release on 10 March 2021 at 16:00 (CET).

== At Eurovision ==
=== Internal selection ===
On 20 March 2020, SRG SSR confirmed that Gjon's Tears would represent Switzerland in the 2021 contest.

=== Rotterdam ===
The 65th edition of the Eurovision Song Contest took place in Rotterdam, the Netherlands and consisted of two semi-finals on 18 May and 20 May 2021, and the grand final on 22 May 2021. According to the Eurovision rules, all participating countries, except the host nation and the "Big Five", consisting of France, Germany, Italy, Spain and the United Kingdom, are required to qualify from one of two semi-finals to compete for the final, although the top 10 countries from the respective semi-final progress to the grand final. On 17 November 2020, it was announced that Switzerland would be performing in the second half of the second semi-final of the contest.

== At The 2022 Winter Olympics ==
The track was used by Georgian figure skater Morisi Kvitelashvili in his short program for 2021–2022 season, which was also presented at 2022 Winter Olympics.

== Track listing ==
Digital download
| No. | Title | Length |
|---|---|---|
| 1. | "Tout l'univers" | 3:03 |

Digital download – Tiery F Remix
| No. | Title | Length |
|---|---|---|
| 1. | "Tout l'univers" (Tiery F Remix) | 3:11 |

== Charts ==
Chart performance for "Tout l'univers"
| Chart (2021–2022) | Peak position |
|---|---|
| Austria (Ö3 Austria Top 40) | 68 |
| Belgium (Ultratop 50 Flanders) | 50 |
| Finland (Suomen virallinen lista) | 5 |
| Germany (GfK) | 86 |
| Global Excl. US (Billboard) | 119 |
| Greece (IFPI) | 27 |
| Iceland (Tónlistinn) | 13 |
| Ireland (IRMA) | 52 |
| Lithuania (AGATA) | 9 |
| Netherlands (Single Top 100) | 16 |
| Norway (VG-lista) | 36 |
| Portugal (AFP) | 118 |
| Sweden (Sverigetopplistan) | 21 |
| Switzerland (Schweizer Hitparade) | 1 |
| UK Singles (Official Charts) | 93 |
| US World Digital Song Sales (Billboard) | 9 |

== Release history ==
Release history and formats for "Tout l'univers"
| Region | Date | Format(s) | Version | Label | Ref. |
|---|---|---|---|---|---|
| Various | 10 March 2021 | Digital download; streaming | Original | Jo & Co; Sony Music | |
| Various | 28 July 2021 | Digital download; streaming | Tiery F Remix | Jo & Co; Sony Music | |
