= Set the World on Fire (Luca Hänni song) =

Single by Luca Hänni

from the album When We Wake Up
- Released: 15 May 2015
- Recorded: 2014
- Genre: R&B; electronic; pop
- Length: 3:39
- Label: Muve
- Songwriters: Gary Pinto; Fabian Egger; Manon Dave; Tushar Apte
- Producer: Manon Dave

Luca Hänni singles chronology
"Only One You" (2014)	"Set the World on Fire" (2015)	"Wonderful" (2015)

"Set the World on Fire" is a song by Swiss singer-songwriter Luca Hänni. It was written by Gary Pinto, Fabian Egger, Manon Dave, and Tushar Apte, and produced by Dave for his fourth studio album When We Wake Up (2015). Muve Recordings released the song as the album's lead single on 15 May 2015 in German-speaking Europe. It peaked at number 35 on the Swiss Singles Chart.

== Music video ==
A music video to accompany the release of "Set the World on Fire" was first released onto YouTube on 11 June 2015 at a total length of four minutes and seven seconds.

== Charts ==
Chart (2015)	Peak position
Switzerland (Schweizer Hitparade)	35

== Release history ==
Region	Date	Format	Label
Switzerland	15 May 2015	Digital download	Muve Recordings
