= Powder (Luca Hänni song) =

- Powder (All Mixes) cover art

Single by Luca Hänni

from the album 110 Karat
- Released: 13 October 2017
- Recorded: 2016
- Genre: Pop
- Length: 3:53
- Label: Muve Recordings
- Songwriter(s): Luca Hänni; Tobias Granbacka; Erik Wigelius
- Producer(s): Erik Wigelius

Luca Hänni singles chronology
"Wonderful" (2015)	"Powder" (2017)	"Signs" (2018)

"Powder" is a song by Swiss singer-songwriter Luca Hänni. It was written by Hänni, Tobias Granbacka and Erik Wigelius and produced by Wigelius. The song was released as a digital single on 13 October 2017 by Muve Recordings. It peaked at number 29 on the Swiss Singles Chart.

== Music video ==
A music video to accompany the release of "Powder" was first released onto YouTube on 13 October 2017 at a total length of four minutes and nine seconds.

== Track listing ==
Digital download
No.	Title	Length
1.	"Powder"	3:53

Digital download (Remixes)
No.	Title	Length
1.	"Powder" (F.K.S Remix)	4:02
2.	"Powder" (Calvis Rainbow Remix)	3:35
3.	"Powder" (Mischkraft Remix)	3:40
4.	"Powder" (Alessio Pras Remix)	4:50
5.	"Powder" (CRIN3S Remix)	3:22

Digital download (All Mixes)
No.	Title	Length
1.	"Powder"	3:52
2.	"Powder" (Orchestral Mix)	4:45
3.	"Powder" (A Cappella mix)	3:53
4.	"Powder" (Alessio Pras Extended Remix)	5:10
5.	"Powder" (Calvis Rainbow Remix)	3:35
6.	"Powder" (CRIN3S Remix)	3:22
7.	"Powder" (F.K.S Remix)	4:02
8.	"Powder" (Mischkraft Remix)	3:40
9.	"Powder" (KayBee Records Remix)	3:06

== Charts ==
Chart (2017–18)	Peak position
Switzerland (Schweizer Hitparade)	29

== Release history ==
Region	Date	Format	Label
Switzerland	13 October 2017	Digital download	Muve
