= Signs (Luca Hänni song) =

Single by Luca Hänni

from the album 110 Karat
- Released: 13 April 2018
- Recorded: 2017
- Genre: Pop; dance-pop; latin pop
- Length: 3:13
- Label: Muve Recordings
- Songwriter(s): Luca Hänni; Rachel Vermeulen
- Producer(s): Mathias Ramson; Erik Wigelius

Luca Hänni singles chronology
"Powder" (2017)	"Signs" (2018)	"She Got Me" (2019)

"Signs" is a song by Swiss singer-songwriter Luca Hänni. It was written by Luca Hänni and Rachel Vermeulen, while production was helmed by Mathias Ramson and Erik Wigelius. The song was released as a digital single on 13 April 2018 by Muve Recordings. It peaked at number 53 on the Swiss Singles Chart.

== Music video ==
A music video to accompany the release of "Signs" was first released onto YouTube on 16 April 2018 at a total length of four minutes and twenty-two seconds.

== Track listing ==
Digital download
No.	Title	Length
1.	"Signs"	3:13

== Charts ==
Chart (2018)	Peak position
Switzerland (Schweizer Hitparade)	53

== Release history ==
Region	Date	Format	Label
Switzerland	13 April 2018	Digital download	Muve Recordings
