= Good Time (Luca Hänni and Christopher S song) =

Single by Luca Hänni and Christopher S

from the album Dance Until We Die
- Released: 13 June 2014
- Recorded: 2013
- Genre: Pop
- Length: 3:23
- Label: Future Soundz
- Songwriter(s): Mathias Ramson; Michael Keller; Michel Lüchinger
- Producer(s): Michel Lüchinger

Luca Hänni singles chronology
"I Can't Get No Sleep" (2014)	"Good Time" (2014)	"Only One You" (2014)

"Good Time" is a song by Swiss musicians Luca Hänni and DJ Christopher S. It was written by Mathias Ramson, Michael Keller and Michel Lüchinger and produced by the latter for Hänni's third studio album Dance Until We Die (2014). The song was released as the album's second single on 13 June 2014. It became the album's second consecutive top thirty entry when it peaked at number 28 on the Swiss Singles Chart.

== Music video ==
A music video to accompany the release of "Good Time" was first released onto YouTube on 17 June 2014 at a total length of three minutes and twenty-nine seconds.

== Track listing ==
Digital download
No.	Title	Length
1.	"Good Time" (Radio Mix)	3:23
2.	"Good Time" (Flava & Stevenson Radio Mix)	3:06
3.	"Good Time" (Extended Mix)	5:17
4.	"Good Time" (Flava & Stevenson Remix)	4:17

== Charts ==
Chart (2014)	Peak position
Switzerland (Schweizer Hitparade)	28

== Release history ==
Region	Date	Format	Label
Switzerland	13 June 2014	Digital download	Universal Music
