= Nebenbei =

Single by Luca Hänni

from the album 110 Karat
- Released: 20 December 2019
- Length: 3:41
- Label: Muve Recordings
- Songwriter(s): Mathias Ramson; Luca Hänni
- Producer(s): Mathias Ramson

Luca Hänni singles chronology
"Bella Bella" (2019)	"Nebenbei" (2019)	"Nie mehr allein" (2020)

"Nebenbei" is a song by Swiss singer Luca Hänni. It was written by Hänni, Mathias Ramson, and Pille Hillebrand. The song was released on 20 December 2019 by Muve Recordings. It peaked at number 64 on the Swiss Singles Chart.

== Background ==
The song is about his relationship with his girlfriend and how important it is to there for each other in good and bad times. It's totally different from his ESC song, but the song itself is even more powerful.

== Track listing ==
Digital download
No.	Title	Length
1.	"Nebenbei"	3:41

== Personnel ==
Credits adapted from Tidal.

- Mathias Ramson – Producer, composer, mixing engineer
- Luca Hänni – Composer

== Charts ==
Chart (2019)	Peak position
Switzerland (Schweizer Hitparade)	64

== Release history ==
Region	Date	Format	Label
Switzerland	20 December 2019	Digital download; streaming	Muve Recordings
