= Shameless (Luca Hänni song) =

Single by Luca Hänni

from the album Living the Dream
- Released: 12 April 2013
- Recorded: 2012
- Genre: Pop
- Length: 3:32
- Label: Universal Music
- Songwriter(s): Allan Eshuijs; Tjeerd Oosterhuis; Matthew Tishler
- Producer(s): Eshuijs; Oosterhuis

Luca Hänni singles chronology
"I Will Die for You" (2012)	"Shameless" (2013)	"I Can't Get No Sleep" (2014)

"Shameless" is a song by Swiss singer-songwriter Luca Hänni. It was written by Allan Eshuijs, Tjeerd Oosterhuis and Matthew Tishler for his second studio album Living the Dream (2013), while production was overseen by Eshuijs and Oosterhuis. Selected as the album's first and only single, the song was released as a digital download on 12 April 2013 by Universal Music. It peaked at number 25 on the Swiss Singles Chart and entered the top fifty in Austria and Germany.

== Music video ==
A music video to accompany the release of "Shameless" was first released onto YouTube on 11 April 2013 at a total length of three minutes and thirty-three seconds.

== Charts ==
Chart (2013)	Peak position
Austria (Ö3 Austria Top 40)	46
Germany (GfK)	49
Switzerland (Schweizer Hitparade)	25

== Release history ==
Region	Date	Format	Label
Switzerland	12 April 2013	Digital download	Universal Music
