= When We Wake Up =

Studio album by Luca Hänni
- Released: 18 September 2015
- Genre: Pop; R&B; electronic; dance-pop; electropop; acoustic
- Label: Muve
- Producer: A-Dee; Tushar Apte; Fabian Egger; Luca Hänni; Archie McKnight; Niko McKnight

Luca Hänni chronology
Dance Until We Die (2014)	When We Wake Up (2015)	110 Karat (2020)

Singles from When We Wake Up
- 1. "Set the World on Fire" Released: 15 May 2015; 2. "Wonderful" Released: 28 August 2015

When We Wake Up is the fourth studio album by Swiss recording artist Luca Hänni. It was released by Muve Recordings on 18 September 2015 in German-speaking Europe. It reached number six on the Swiss Album Charts.

== Track listing ==
No.	Title	Writer(s)	Producer(s)	Length
1.	"Nothing to Lose"	Luca Hänni; Fabian Egger; Niko McKnight; Archie McKnight	Egger	4:24
2.	"Let Go"	Hänni; Egger; N. McKnight; A. McKnight	Egger; N. McKnight	4:07
3.	"Set the World on Fire"	Gary Pinto; Egger; Manon Dave; Tushar Apte	Dave	3:39
4.	"Imma Get You"	A-Dee; Apte; Sam Stone	A-Dee	3:34
5.	"Summer Love"	Egger; Apte; Tori Marshall; Jeremy Thurber	Apte	3:48
6.	"Lady"	Hänni; Egger; A. McKnight	Egger; N. McKnight	3:34
7.	"When We Wake Up"	Hänni; Egger; N. McKnight; A. McKnight	Egger; N. McKnight	4:56
8.	"Lonely Days"	Hänni; Egger; A. McKnight	Egger; A. McKnight	3:58
9.	"Wonderful"	Eric van Tijn; Jochem Fluitsma; Joachim Vermeulen Windsant; Maarten ten Hove; Willem Laseroms; Mark van Tijn; Ramon Marco	Egger	3:23
10.	"All I Want Is You" (featuring Andre Merritt)	Merritt; Hänni	Hänni; Egger	4:24
11.	"Going Home"	Hänni; Egger; N. McKnight; A. McKnight	Egger; N. McKnight	4:11

iTunes bonus track
No.	Title	Length
12.	"More"	3:35

== Charts ==
Chart (2015)	Peak position
Austrian Albums (Ö3 Austria)	47
German Albums (Offizielle Top 100)	81
Swiss Albums (Schweizer Hitparade)	6
