= Stones (Zibbz song) =

2018 song by Zibbz

Single by Zibbz
- Released: 9 January 2018
- Genre: Pop rock
- Length: 2:59
- Label: 6003
- Songwriters: Corinne Gfeller; Stee Gfeller; Laurell Barker
- Producers: Herman Gardarfve; Stee Gfeller

Zibbz singles chronology
"Run" (2017)	"Stones" (2018)	"RICH" (2018)

Music video
- "Stones" on YouTube

Eurovision Song Contest 2018 entry
- Country: Switzerland
- Artist: Zibbz
- Language: English
- Composers: Corinne Gfeller; Stee Gfeller; Laurell Barker
- Lyricists: Corinne Gfeller; Stee Gfeller; Laurell Barker

Finals performance
- Semi-final result: 13th
- Semi-final points: 86

Entry chronology
- ◄ "Apollo" (2017)
- "She Got Me" (2019) ►

"Stones" is a song performed by Swiss duo Zibbz. The song was released as a digital download on 9 January 2018 through 6003 Records, and was written by Zibbz along with Canadian songwriter Laurell Barker. It represented Switzerland in the Eurovision Song Contest 2018.

== Eurovision Song Contest ==
On 9 January 2018, Zibbz was announced as one of the six competitors in the ESC 2018 – Die Entscheidungsshow, the Swiss national final for the Eurovision Song Contest 2018. The final was held on 4 February 2018, and "Stones" was declared the winner after receiving the highest number of points from both the international juries and Swiss public. It represented Switzerland in the Eurovision Song Contest 2018.

The song competed in the first semi-final, held on 8 May 2018 in Lisbon, Portugal. However, they failed to qualify for the final of 12 May.

== Track listing ==
Digital download
No.	Title	Length
1.	"Stones"	2:59

== Charts ==
Chart (2018)	Peak position
Switzerland (Schweizer Hitparade)	62

== Release history ==
Region	Date	Format	Label
Worldwide	9 January 2018	Digital download	6003 Records
