= Living the Dream (Luca Hänni album) =

Studio album by Luca Hänni
- Released: 19 April 2013
- Label: Universal
- Producer: Andre "Brix" Buchmann; Allan Eshuijs; Fluitsma & Van Tijn; TJ Oosterhuis; Mathias Ramson

Luca Hänni chronology
| My Name Is Luca (2012) | Living the Dream (2013) | Dance Until We Die (2014) |

Singles from Living the Dream
- 1. "Shameless" Released: 12 April 2013

Living the Dream is the second studio album by Swiss recording artist Luca Hänni. It was released by Universal Music on 19 April 2013 in German-speaking Europe. It topped the Swiss Album Charts and reached the top ten in Austria.

== Track listing ==
| No. | Title | Writer(s) | Producer(s) | Length |
|---|---|---|---|---|
| 1. | "Shameless" | Allan Eshuijs; Tjeerd Oosterhuis; Matthew Tishler | Eshuijs; Oosterhuis | 3:32 |
| 2. | "Crazy" | Fluitsma & Van Tijn | Fluitsma & Van Tijn | 3:34 |
| 3. | "Hollywood Sky" | Henrik Nordenback; Christian Fast; Andreas Moe | Mathias Ramson; Brix | 3:13 |
| 4. | "Rooftop" | Ivan Peroti; Xerxes Bakker; Bart Janssen | Ramson; Brix | 3:57 |
| 5. | "Running" | Curtis Richa; Cristiaan Hof | Ramson; Brix | 3:37 |
| 6. | "Don't Say It's Too Late" | Daniel Gibson; Han Kooreneef; Allan Eshuijs; Jozien Eshuijs | Ramson; Brix | 3:11 |
| 7. | "Dirty Mind" | Ramson; Kay Bennet Krutoff; Simon Heger | Ramson; Brix | 4:00 |
| 8. | "Don't Dance All Over My Heart" | Brett Detar; Benjamin Romans | Ramson; Brix | 3:30 |
| 9. | "Doctor Gimme Something" | Jörg Weisselberg; Ian Mack; Ramson | Ramson; Brix | 3:47 |
| 10. | "Jump Start the Party" | Andrew Love; Allan Eshuijs; Oosterhuis | Ramson; Brix | 3:21 |
| 11. | "The Best Thing" | Hänni; Ginger Mackenzie | Ramson; Brix | 3:28 |
| 12. | "Closer to You" | Hänni; Mackenzie | Ramson; Brix | 3:45 |
| 13. | "Shameless" (Christopher S Remix Extended Version) | Allan Eshuijs; Oosterhuis; Tishler | Eshuijs; Oosterhuis | 5:55 |

== Charts ==
| Chart (2013) | Peak position |
|---|---|
| Austrian Albums (Ö3 Austria) | 8 |
| German Albums (Offizielle Top 100) | 17 |
| Swiss Albums (Schweizer Hitparade) | 1 |
