= 110 Karat =

Studio album by Luca Hänni
- Released: 9 October 2020
- Genre: Pop; dance-pop; europop; electropop; experimental pop
- Length: 51:43
- Label: Muve
- Producer: Laurell Barker; Jon Hällgren; Lukas Hällgren; Pele Loriano; Mathias Ramson; Erik Wigelius

Luca Hänni chronology
When We Wake Up (2015)	110 Karat (2020)	Live (2020)

Singles from 110 Karat
- 1. "She Got Me" Released: 8 March 2019; 2. "Nebenbei" Released: 20 December 2019; 3. "Nie mehr allein" Released: 6 March 2020; 4. "Diamant" Released: 22 May 2020

110 Karat is the fifth studio album by Swiss singer Luca Hänni. It was released on 9 October 2020 by Muve Recordings. The album marks Hänni's first album to be primarily recorded in German. It reached number two on the Swiss Album Charts.

== Singles ==
"Nebenbei" was released as the lead single from the album on 20 December 2019. The song peaked at number sixty-four on the Swiss Singles Chart. "Nie mehr allein" was released as the second single from the album on 6 March 2020. "Diamant" was released as the third single from the album on 22 May 2020. The song peaked at number sixty-five on the Swiss Singles Chart.

== Track listing ==
Credits adapted from Tidal.

No.	Title	Writer(s)	Producer(s)	Length
1.	"Diamant"	Choukri Gustmann; Lukas Loules; Mathias Ramson; Nebil Latifa	Mathias Ramson	2:59
2.	"Nie mehr allein"	Karo Schrader; Luca Hänni; Ramson	Ramson	3:08
3.	"Ist mir egal"	Choukri Gustmannebil; Loules; Ramson; Tolga Saya Yildrim	Ramson	3:02
4.	"Zeig mir, dass es geht"	Hänni; Ramson; Philipp Klemz	Ramson	3:30
5.	"Wir bleiben wach"	Gustmannebil; Loules; Ramson; Yildrim	Ramson	3:09
6.	"All in"	Ela Steinmetz; Max Kuehn; Yannick Steffen	Ramson	3:24
7.	"Du bist Sonntag"	Johannes Herbst; Hänni; Ramson; Tamara Olorga	Ramson	3:26
8.	"Extrameile"	Hänni; Ramson; Revelle	Ramson	3:06
9.	"Ich frag mich immer wieder"	Hänni; Ramson; Pille Hillebrand	Ramson	3:20
10.	"Zurück zu mir"	Hänni; Ramson; Klemz	Ramson	3:02
11.	"Dieser Moment"	Carolina Bigge; Hänni; Ramson	Ramson	3:00
12.	"Nebenbei"	Hänni; Ramson; Hillebrand	Ramson	3:41

Bonus tracks
No.	Title	Writer(s)	Producer(s)	Length
13.	"Powder"	Erik Wigelius; Hänni; Tobias Granbacka	Erik Wigelius	3:53
14.	"Signs"	Hänni; Rachel Vermeulen	Ramson; Wigelius	3:15
15.	"Bella Bella"	Frazer Mac; Jon Hällgren; Laurell Barker; Lukas Hällgren; Pele Loriano	Jon Hällgren; Laurell Barker; Lukas Hällgren; Pele Loriano	2:56
16.	"She Got Me"	Hänni; Barker; Mac; J. Hällgren; L. Hällgren	J. Hällgren; L. Hällgren	3:00

== Charts ==
=== Weekly charts ===
Chart (2020)	Peak position
German Albums (Offizielle Top 100)	74
Swiss Albums (Schweizer Hitparade)	2

=== Year-end charts ===
Chart (2020)	Position
Swiss Albums (Schweizer Hitparade)	87

== Release history ==
Region	Date	Format(s)	Label	Ref.
Various	9 October 2020	CD; digital download; streaming	Muve	
