= Diamant (song) =

Single by Luca Hänni

from the album 110 Karat
- Released: 22 May 2020
- Genre: Pop; dance-pop; tropical house
- Length: 2:58
- Label: Muve Recordings
- Songwriter(s): Mathias Ramson; Lukas Loules; Nebil Latifa; Choukri Gustmann
- Producer(s): Ramson

Luca Hänni singles chronology
"Nie mehr allein" (2020)	"Diamant" (2020)	"Wo Warst Du" (2021)

"Diamant" (English: Diamond) is a song by Swiss singer Luca Hänni. It was written by Mathias Ramson, Lukas Loules, Nebil Latifa and Choukri Gustmann for his yet-to-be-titled fifth studio album. The song was released as a digital single on 22 May 2020 by Muve Recordings. "Diamant" peaked at number 65 on the Swiss Singles Chart.

== Critical reception ==
Jonathan Vautrey of Wiwibloggs said, "A contemporary pop track with an almost tropical rhythm, Hänni sings to his loved one and compares them to a sparkling diamond."

== Music video ==
A music video to accompany the release of "Diamant" was first released onto YouTube on 11 June 2020. The music video features Christina Luft, Hänni's professional dancing partner from when he finished third in the thirteenth season of the German talent series Let's Dance.

== Track listing ==
Digital download
No.	Title	Length
1.	"Diamant"	2:58

Digital download
No.	Title	Length
1.	"Diamant" (Sunlike Brothers Remix)	2:33
2.	"Diamant"	2:58

Digital download
No.	Title	Length
1.	"Diamant" (Crystal Rock Remix)	3:42
2.	"Diamant" (Sunlike Brothers Remix)	2:33

== Personnel ==
Credits adapted from Tidal.

- Mathias Ramson – Producer, composer, mixing engineer
- Choukri Gustmann – Composer
- Lukas Loules – Composer
- Nebil Latifa – Composer

== Charts ==
Chart (2019)	Peak position
Switzerland (Schweizer Hitparade)	65

== Release history ==
Region	Date	Format	Label
Switzerland	22 May 2020	Digital download; streaming	Muve Recordings
