= Répondez-moi =

2020 song by Gjon's Tears

Single by Gjon's Tears
- Released: 6 March 2020
- Length: 2:59
- Label: Muve
- Songwriters: Gjon Muharremaj; Alizé Oswald; Jeroen Swinnen; Xavier Michel

Gjon's Tears singles chronology
"Back in Light" (2018)	"Répondez-moi" (2020)	"Tout l'univers" (2021)

Music video
- "Répondez-moi" on YouTube

Eurovision Song Contest 2020 entry
- Country: Switzerland
- Artist: Gjon's Tears
- Language: French
- Composers: Gjon Muharremaj; Alizé Oswald; Jeroen Swinnen; Xavier Michel
- Lyricists: Gjon Muharremaj; Alizé Oswald; Jeroen Swinnen; Xavier Michel

Finals performance
- Semi-final result: Contest cancelled

Entry chronology
- ◄ "She Got Me" (2019)
- "Tout l'univers" (2021) ►

"Répondez-moi" (French pronunciation: [ʁepɔ̃demwa]; transl. Answer me) is a song by Swiss singer Gjon's Tears. It was released as a single on 6 March 2020 by Muve. The song was composed and written by the singer himself along Alizé Oswald, Jeroen Swinnen and Xavier Michel. The song was scheduled to represent Switzerland in the Eurovision Song Contest 2020 in Rotterdam, the Netherlands, before the contest's cancellation due to the COVID-19 pandemic.

== Background and composition ==
The subject of the song is personal for Gjon's Tears. He said, "Everyone asks themselves why exactly are we here, where do we come from and where are we going. These are key questions, particularly for people from a migrant background. My parents are from Albania and Kosovo. I grew up in Switzerland and it's my home, these are questions that I think about a lot."

== Release and promotion ==
A music video to accompany the release of "Répondez-moi" was first released onto YouTube on 4 March 2020. Gjon's Tears wanted to do more than just arouse emotion and show impressive shots, he wanted to create his own world of memories, dreams and reality. For this, he took inspiration from the style of one of his favourite filmmakers, Andrei Tarkovsky. He said, "The shooting was more difficult than expected because we wanted to use real elements to create rain, snow and fire. In order to control the fire in the fight scene, we burned 8 curtains for sure." The video was directed by Janine Piguet. The video also features his parents, his brother and grandmother. It was shot in Fribourg Library, amongst other places.

== At Eurovision ==
The song was selected to represent Switzerland in the Eurovision Song Contest 2020 after Gjon's Tears was internally selected by the Swiss broadcaster Swiss Broadcasting Corporation (SRG SSR). On 28 January 2020, an allocation draw was held which placed each country into one of the two semi-finals, as well as which half of the show they would perform in. Switzerland was placed into the second semi-final, to be held on 14 May 2020, and was scheduled to perform in the second half of the show.

== Remake ==
Electronic music duo gardenstate, composed of Marcus Schössow and Matt Felner, remixed the track for their 2021 album Inspirations.

== Track listings ==
- Digital download
1. "Répondez-moi" – 2:59
2. "Répondez-moi" (Karaoke Version) – 2:59
- Digital download - remix
1. "Répondez-moi - Sunlike Brothers Remix" – 2:22

== Charts ==
Chart (2020–2021)	Peak position
Switzerland (Schweizer Hitparade)	42
Switzerland (Charts Romandie)	10

== Release history ==
Region	Date	Format	Label	Ref.
Various	6 March 2020	Digital download; streaming	Muve	
