= Dance Until We Die =

Studio album by Luca Hänni and Christopher S
- Released: 11 April 2014
- Studio: Valicon Studio II
- Label: Future Soundz
- Producer: Michel Lüchinger

Luca Hänni chronology
Living the Dream (2013)	Dance Until We Die (2014)	When We Wake Up (2015)

Singles from Dance Until We Die
- 1. "I Can't Get No Sleep" Released: 11 April 2014; 2. "Good Time" Released: 13 June 2014

Dance Until We Die is the third studio album by Swiss recording artist Luca Hänni and Christopher S. It was released by Future Soundz on 11 April 2014. The album peaked at number 6 on the Swiss Albums Chart, and includes the singles "I Can't Get No Sleep" and "Good Time".

== Track listing ==
No.	Title	Length
1.	"Good Time"	3:23
2.	"I Can't Get No Sleep"	3:44
3.	"Dance Until We Die"	3:01
4.	"Life Is Good"	3:27
5.	"Dirty Bass"	3:23
6.	"Fighters"	3:09
7.	"Living the Dream"	3:36
8.	"The World Is Watching Me"	3:52
9.	"Love Is a Bond"	3:27
10.	"Like There's No Tomorrow" (feat. Nate-Ivity)	3:25
11.	"Rule the World"	3:25
12.	"The Morning"	3:26

== Charts ==
Chart (2014)	Peak position
Austrian Albums (Ö3 Austria)	38
German Albums (Offizielle Top 100)	51
Swiss Albums (Schweizer Hitparade)	6
