= My Name Is Luca =

Studio album by Luca Hänni
- Released: 18 May 2012
- Length: 41:39
- Label: Universal
- Producer: Dieter Bohlen

Luca Hänni chronology
My Name Is Luca (2012)	Living the Dream (2013)

Singles from My Name Is Luca
- 1. "Don't Think About Me" Released: 28 April 2012; 2. "I Will Die for You" Released: 24 August 2012

My Name Is Luca is the debut studio album by Swiss recording artist Luca Hänni, the winner of the ninth season of Deutschland Sucht Den Superstar, the German version of American Idol. It was released by Universal Music on 18 May 2012 in German-speaking Europe. Entirely produced by DSDS judge Dieter Bohlen, the album contains two cover versions which were already performed by Hänni during the DSDS shows, including "The A Team" by Ed Sheeran and "Baby" by Justin Bieber.

== Critical reception ==
Professional ratings
Review scores
Source	Rating
laut.de	1/5 stars

Writing for laut.de, Dani Fromm wrote that My Name Is Luca was a hastily assembled DSDS compilation lacking any distinct artistic profile, stating: "No edges, no corners, no vocal volume. Nothing!" She emphasized its immediate forgettability and criticized Dieter Bohlen's formulaic production and clichéd lyrics, concluding: "No charisma, no unique selling point. Nothing!"

== Commercial performance ==
The album achieved strong commercial success in German-speaking Europe. It reached number one in both Austria and Switzerland, while peaking at number two on the German Albums Chart. In year-end rankings, it placed at number 37 in Austria, number 69 in Germany, and number 26 in Switzerland. The record was certified Gold in both Austria (10,000 units) and Switzerland (15,000 units).

== Track listing ==
All tracks produced by Dieter Bohlen.

My Name Is Luca track listing
No.	Title	Writer(s)	Length
1.	"Don't Think About Me"	Dieter Bohlen	3:43
2.	"The A Team"	Ed Sheeran	3:01
3.	"I Believe"	Bohlen	3:31
4.	"Do You Want to Know a Secret"	Bohlen	3:11
5.	"Baby"	Terius Nash; Christopher Bridges; Christopher Stewart; Justin Bieber; Christina Milian	2:55
6.	"The Two of Us"	Bohlen	4:02
7.	"Allein allein"	Felix Räuber; Philipp Makolies; Christian Grochau; Uwe Pasora; Bernhard Wenzel	3:52
8.	"I'll Be There"	Bohlen	3:20
9.	"Use Somebody"	Caleb Followill; Jared Followill; Matthew Followill; Ivan N. Followill	3:37
10.	"Eiserner Steg"	Philipp Poisel; Frank Pilsl; Florian Ostertag	3:28
11.	"I Will Die for You"	Bohlen	3:28
12.	"The Way You Look Tonight"	Bohlen	3:45
Total length:			41:39

My Name Is Luca – Special edition
No.	Title	Writer(s)	Length
12.	"Das Beste"	Thomas Stolle; Johannes Stolle; Andreas Nowak; Stefanie Kloss	3:46

== Charts ==
=== Weekly charts ===
Weekly chart performance for My Name Is Luca
Chart (2012)	Peak position
Austrian Albums (Ö3 Austria)	1
German Albums (Offizielle Top 100)	2
Swiss Albums (Schweizer Hitparade)	1

=== Year-end charts ===
Year-end chart performance for My Name Is Luca
Chart (2012)	Position
Austrian Albums (Ö3 Austria)	37
German Albums (Offizielle Top 100)	69
Swiss Albums (Schweizer Hitparade)	26

== Certifications ==
Certifications for My Name Is Luca
Region	Certification	Certified units/sales
Austria (IFPI Austria)	Gold	10,000^{*}
Switzerland (IFPI Switzerland)	Gold	15,000^{^}
^{*} Sales figures based on certification alone.^{^} Shipments figures based on certification alone.
