= I Will Die for You =

Single by Luca Hänni

from the album My Name Is Luca
- Released: 24 August 2012
- Recorded: 2012
- Genre: Pop
- Length: 3:28
- Label: Universal Music
- Songwriter(s): Dieter Bohlen
- Producer(s): Dieter Bohlen

Luca Hänni singles chronology
"Don't Think About Me" (2012)	"I Will Die for You" (2012)	"Shameless" (2013)

"I Will Die for You" is a song by Swiss singer-songwriter Luca Hänni. It was written and produced by Dieter Bohlen for from his debut studio album My Name Is Luca (2012). The song was released as the album's second single on 24 August 2012 by Universal Music and peaked at number 37 on the Swiss Singles Chart.

== Music video ==
A music video to accompany the release of "I Will Die for You" was first released onto YouTube on 1 October 2013 at a total length of three minutes and twenty-nine seconds.

== Track listing ==
Digital download
No.	Title	Length
1.	"I Will Die for You"	3:28
2.	"I Will Die for You" (Mike Candys 2012 Radio Edit)	3:29
3.	"I Will Die for You" (Mike Candys 2012 Remix)	5:00
4.	"Oh No No"	3:37

== Charts ==
Chart (2012)	Peak position
Austria (Ö3 Austria Top 40)	46
Germany (GfK)	54
Switzerland (Schweizer Hitparade)	37

== Release history ==
Region	Date	Format	Label
Switzerland	24 August 2012	Digital download	Universal Music
