= Don't Think About Me =

Single by Luca Hänni

from the album My Name Is Luca
- Released: 28 April 2012
- Length: 3:43
- Label: Universal Music Germany
- Songwriter: Dieter Bohlen
- Producer: Dieter Bohlen

Luca Hänni singles chronology
"Don't Think About Me" (2012)	"I Will Die for You" (2012)

"Don't Think About Me" is a song by Swiss recording artist Luca Hänni. Serving as his coronation song from Deutschland sucht den Superstar, the uptempo pop rock song was written and produced by DSDS judge Dieter Bohlen and released as the first single from his debut studio album, My Name Is Luca (2012), on April 28, 2012 in German-speaking Europe. An instant success, it debuted atop the single charts in Austria, Germany, and Switzerland and sold more than 100,000 copies throughout its chart run.

== Music video ==
The music video for "Don't Think About Me" was filmed on April 30, 2012 in Rømø, Denmark.

== Track listings ==
All tracks written and produced by Dieter Bohlen; co-produced by Joachim "Jeo" Mezei.

Digital download
No.	Title	Length
1.	"Don't Think About Me"	3:43
2.	"Don't Think About Me" (A-Team Remix)	3:44

== Charts ==
=== Weekly charts ===
Weekly chart performance for "Don't Think About Me"
Chart (2012)	Peak position
Austria (Ö3 Austria Top 40)	1
Euro Digital Songs (Billboard)	10
Germany (GfK)	1
Switzerland (Schweizer Hitparade)	1

=== Year-end charts ===
Year-end chart performance for "Don't Think About Me"
Chart (2012)	Position
Germany (GfK)	77
Switzerland (Schweizer Hitparade)	48

== Certifications ==
Certifications for "Don't Think About Me"
Region	Certification	Certified units/sales
Switzerland (IFPI Switzerland)	Gold	15,000^{^}
^{^} Shipments figures based on certification alone.

== Release history ==
"Don't Think About Me" release history
Region	Date	Format(s)	Label(s)	Ref.
Various	April 28, 2012	Digital download	Universal Music Germany	
Various	May 2, 2012	CD Single	Universal Music Germany	
