= Bella Bella (song) =

2019 single by Luca Hänni

Single by Luca Hänni

from the album 110 Karat
- Released: 6 September 2019
- Genre: Dance-pop; latin pop; electropop; reggaeton
- Length: 2:56
- Label: Muve Recordings
- Songwriters: Frazer Mac; Jon Hällgren; Laurell Barker; Luca Hänni; Lukas Hällgren; Pele Loriano
- Producers: Jon Hällgren; Lukas Hällgren; Pele Loriano

Luca Hänni singles chronology
"She Got Me" (2019)	"Bella Bella" (2019)	"Nebenbei" (2019)

"Bella Bella" is a song by Swiss singer Luca Hänni. It was written by Hänni alongside Frazer Mac, Jon and Lukas Hällgren, Laurell Barker and Pele Loriano. The song was released on 6 September 2019 by Muve Recordings. A music video to accompany the release of "Bella Bella" was first released onto YouTube on 12 September 2019.

== Track listing ==
Digital download
No.	Title	Length
1.	"Bella Bella"	2:56

== Personnel ==
Credits adapted from Tidal.

- Jon Hällgren – Producer, composer, lyricist, mixer
- Lukas Hällgren – Producer, composer, lyricist
- Pele Loriano – Producer, composer, lyricist, mixer
- Frazer Mac – Composer, lyricist
- Laurell Barker – Composer, lyricist
- Luca Hänni – Composer, lyricist

== Charts ==
Chart (2019)	Peak position
Switzerland (Schweizer Hitparade)	45

== Release history ==
Region	Date	Format	Label
Switzerland	6 September 2019	Digital download; streaming	Muve Recordings
