= Christopher S =

Swiss DJ and producer (born 1969)

- Born: Christopher Spörri; 16 October 1969 (age 56); Bern, Switzerland
- Genres: House; electronic
- Occupations: DJ, producer, songwriter
- Years active: 1996–2016
- Labels: Fuck the DJ!; Wombat Music; Sirup Music

Christopher Spörri (born 16 October 1969), known professionally as Christopher S, is a Swiss DJ, producer and label owner.

== Career ==
Christopher S began his career at the age of 15. He achieved his first success in 2002 with the CD compilation Smell the House Flowers, which reached the top half of the Swiss compilation charts. This was followed by further compilations, including Jetset (2006), V.I.P (2007) and Superstar (2008), which each reached number 1 in the Swiss compilation charts.

His single Star reached number 98 in the German single charts and number 64 in the Swiss charts. This resulted in a contract with the German record label Kontor Records. The later singles One Day, Tear Down the Club and Rock this Club were also successful. In 2014, Christopher S toured Switzerland together with Luca Hänni, the winner of the 9th season of the German reality talent show Deutschland sucht den Superstar. A joint studio album and two singles were released. The album and the two singles achieved good chart positions. His last album Finale was released in 2016 and contained songs from his active DJ days from 1996 to 2016.

With Fuck the DJ! For a short period of time he owned his own house label, which mainly signed Swiss dance and house artists.

== Legal problems ==
When his personal bankruptcy was announced, Spörri withdrew from nightlife and worked for a publishing house until 2018. On 25 November 2016, he was sentenced to six years in prison by the Bern regional court for incitement to arson and attempted insurance fraud. He pleaded innocent and appealed the verdict. On 3 July 2018, he was sentenced in the second instance by the Bern High Court to a prison sentence of four years and a conditional fine of CHF 23,400. In addition, there were compensation payments totaling CHF 142,500. He lodged an appeal against this judgment with the Federal Court. As a final instance, however, the High Court upheld the judgment of the Higher Court on 3 October 2019, meaning that Spörri had to serve a four-year prison sentence. Despite the Federal Court's decision, Spörri continued to fight and filed a complaint with the European Court of Human Rights in Strasbourg. The ECHR also dismissed the complaint and Spörri had to begin his sentence at the beginning of 2022 - delayed due to the COVID-19 pandemic - in the Witzwil Correctional Facility in the canton of Bern.

== Discography ==
=== Studio albums ===
- 2010: Fabulous
- 2010: Houseclass
- 2011: Glorious
- 2011: Sincere
- 2014: Dance Until We Die (with Luca Hänni)

=== Compilation albums ===
- 1999: Nation to Nation
- 2000: Ugly House 8
- 2001: Double House Vol. 2
- 2001: Official Radio Street Parade 2001
- 2001: Houseflowers
- 2002: Double House Vol. 3
- 2002: Double House Vol. 4
- 2002: Smell the House Flowers
- 2003: House Boulevard
- 2004: Double House Vol. 6
- 2005: Lifestyle
- 2006: Luxury
- 2006: Energy 2006 House
- 2006: Jet Set
- 2007: F.A.M.O.U.S.
- 2007: Energy 2007 House
- 2007: V.I.P
- 2008: Energy 2008 House
- 2008: Superstar
- 2008: Champions
- 2009: Fuck the DJ
- 2009: Energy 2009 House
- 2009: Highlight
- 2009: Fuck the DJ Pt.2
- 2010: Fuck the DJ Pt. 3
- 2010: Energy 2010 House
- 2010: Fuck the DJ Pt. 4
- 2011: Fuck the DJ Pt. 5
- 2012: Fuck the DJ Pt. 6
- 2012: Fuck the DJ Pt. 7
- 2012: Tear Down the Club
- 2013: Fuck the DJ Vol. 8
