= She Got Me =

2019 song by Luca Hänni

Single by Luca Hänni

from the album 110 Karat
- Released: 8 March 2019
- Genre: Pop; dance-Pop; latin pop; europop; tropical house
- Length: 3:01
- Label: Muve
- Songwriter(s): Laurell Barker; Frazer Mac; Luca Hänni; Jon Hällgren; Lukas Hällgren
- Producer(s): Jon Hällgren; Lukas Hällgren

Luca Hänni singles chronology
"Signs" (2018)	"She Got Me" (2019)	"Bella Bella" (2019)

Music video
- "She Got Me" on YouTube

Eurovision Song Contest 2019 entry
- Country: Switzerland
- Artist(s): Luca Hänni
- Language: English
- Composer(s): Laurell Barker; Frazer Mac; Luca Hänni; Jenson Vaughan; Jon Hällgren; Lukas Hällgren
- Lyricist(s): Laurell Barker; Frazer Mac; Luca Hänni; Jenson Vaughan; Jon Hällgren; Lukas Hällgren

Finals performance
- Semi-final result: 4th
- Semi-final points: 232
- Final result: 4th
- Final points: 364

Entry chronology
- ◄ "Stones" (2018)
- "Répondez-moi" (2020) ►

"She Got Me" is a song recorded by Swiss singer Luca Hänni. It was written by Hänni, Laurell Barker, Frazer Mac, Jenson Vaughan, Jon Hällgren, and Lukas Hällgren, while production was helmed by the latter two. It was released for digital download as a single on 8 March 2019. "She Got Me" represented Switzerland in the Eurovision Song Contest 2019 in Tel Aviv, finishing in fourth place with 364 points.

== Eurovision Song Contest ==
The song represented Switzerland in the Eurovision Song Contest 2019, after Luca Hänni was internally selected by the Swiss broadcaster. On 28 January 2019, a special allocation draw was held which placed each country into one of the two semi-finals, as well as which half of the show they would perform in. Switzerland was placed into the second semi-final, to be held on 16 May 2019, and was scheduled to perform in the first half of the show. Once all the competing songs for the 2019 contest had been released, the running order for the semi-finals was decided by the show's producers rather than through another draw, so that similar songs were not placed next to each other. Switzerland performed in position 4. It qualified for the final, which took place on 18 May 2019. It finished in fourth place with 364 points. It became Switzerland's first Top 5 finish since 1993.

== Track listing ==
Digital download
No.	Title	Length
1.	"She Got Me"	3:01
2.	"She Got Me" (instrumental)	3:02

== Charts ==
=== Weekly charts ===
Chart (2019)	Peak position
Austria (Ö3 Austria Top 40)	26
Belgium (Ultratip Bubbling Under Flanders)	20
Estonia (Eesti Tipp-40)	5
Euro Digital Songs (Billboard)	6
Finland Digital Song Sales (Billboard)	3
Germany (GfK)	62
Greece International Digital Singles (IFPI)	10
Iceland (Tónlistinn)	3
Ireland (IRMA)	77
Lithuania (AGATA)	4
Netherlands (Single Top 100)	47
Norway (VG-lista)	38
Poland (Polish Airplay Top 100)	42
Scotland (OCC)	45
Spain (PROMUSICAE)	65
Sweden (Sverigetopplistan)	35
Switzerland (Schweizer Hitparade)	1
Switzerland (Media Control Romandy)	1
UK Indie (OCC)	18
UK Singles Downloads (OCC)	32
UK Singles Sales (OCC)	33

=== Year-end charts ===
Chart (2019)	Position
Iceland (Tónlistinn)	47
Switzerland (Schweizer Hitparade)	10

== Certifications ==
Region	Certification	Certified units/sales
Switzerland (IFPI Switzerland)	Platinum	20,000^{‡}
^{‡} Sales+streaming figures based on certification alone.

== Release history ==
Region	Date	Format	Label	Ref.
Various	8 March 2019	Digital download	Muve Recordings	
