= Luca Hänni =

Swiss singer (born 1994)

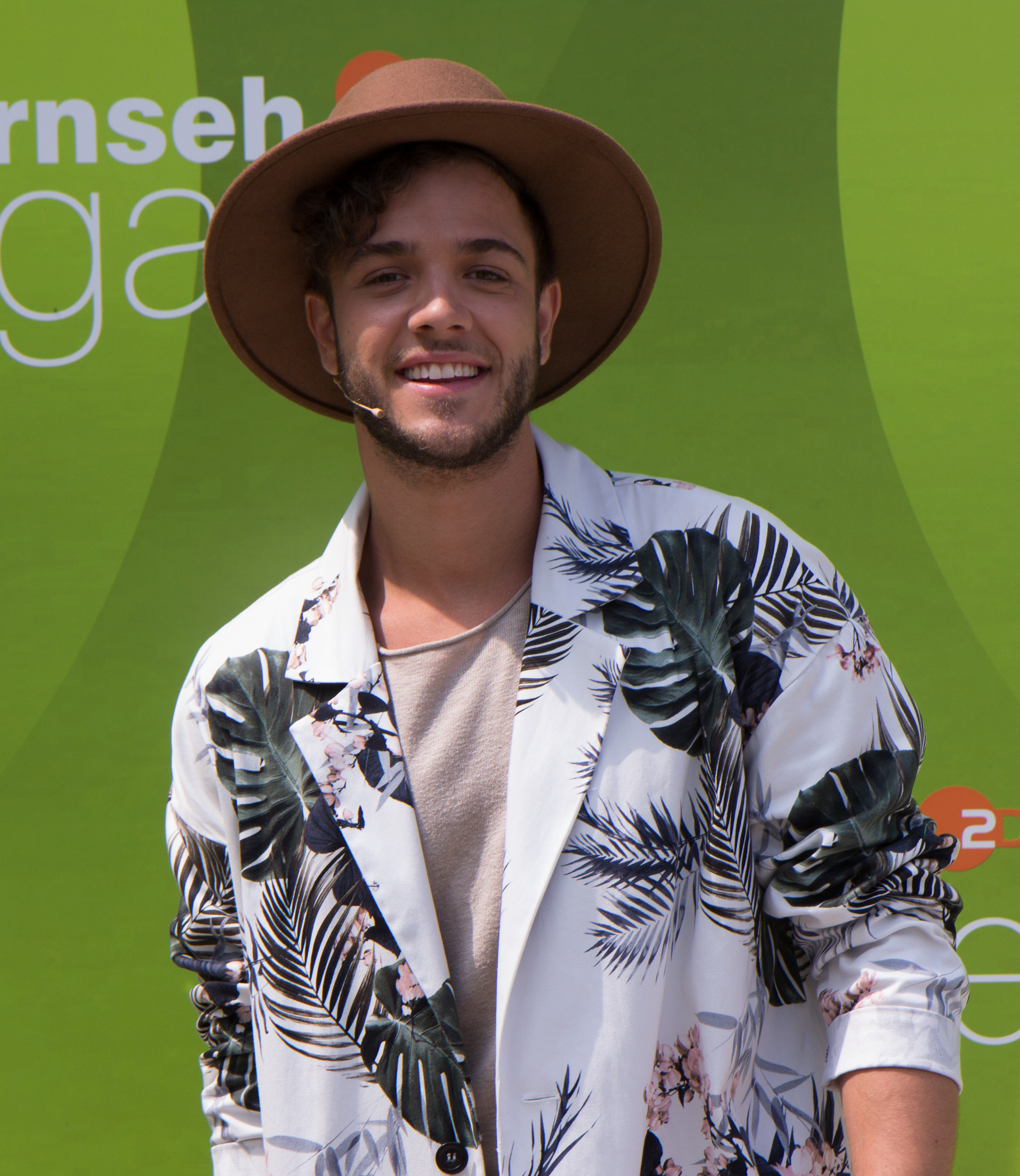
- Hänni in 2018

Background information
- Born: 8 October 1994 (age 31); Bern, Switzerland
- Genres: Pop; Eurodance
- Occupations: Singer; television personality
- Years active: 2012–present
- Label: Universal Music Germany
- Spouse: Christina Luft (m. 2023)
- Website: lucamusic.ch/en

Luca Hänni (born 8 October 1994) is a Swiss singer and television personality. He rose to fame in 2012 after winning the ninth season of Deutschland sucht den Superstar, the German version of the Idol franchise. He was the first non-German to do so and also the youngest ever winner of the show. Hänni's debut single, "Don't Think About Me", topped the singles charts in Austria, Germany, and Switzerland. It was followed by the release of his debut album, My Name Is Luca (2012), which debuted atop the Austrian and Swiss Albums Charts and became a gold-seller in both countries. His second studio album, Living the Dream, released in 2013, became his second consecutive number-one album in Switzerland.

Hänni decided to part ways with DSDS management and collaborated with Swiss DJ Christopher S on his third album, Dance Until We Die (2014). Following the termination of the project, he took further creative control for his fourth album When We Wake Up (2015), which saw him shifting to R&B music and became his fourth consecutive top ten album in Switzerland. Hänni's popularity was further enhanced by his participation in the SRF musical talent show Kampf der Orchester as well as the RTL competitive dancing talent show Dance Dance Dance, both of which he won in 2014 and 2017, respectively. In 2019, Hänni represented Switzerland in the Eurovision Song Contest 2019 with the song "She Got Me", finishing in fourth place.

== Personal life ==
Hänni was born in Bern, Switzerland. During kindergarten he received drumming lessons. At the age of nine he taught himself to play the guitar and piano. After finishing school he began training as a bricklayer, which he later stopped in 2012, two years in, in favour of his music career.

Since 2020 he is in a relationship with his Let's Dance dancing partner Christina Luft. In August 2023, the couple got married. In December 2023, the couple announced that they were expecting their first child. In June 2024 they became parents to a daughter.

== Career ==
=== 2012–2013: DSDS and subsequent success ===
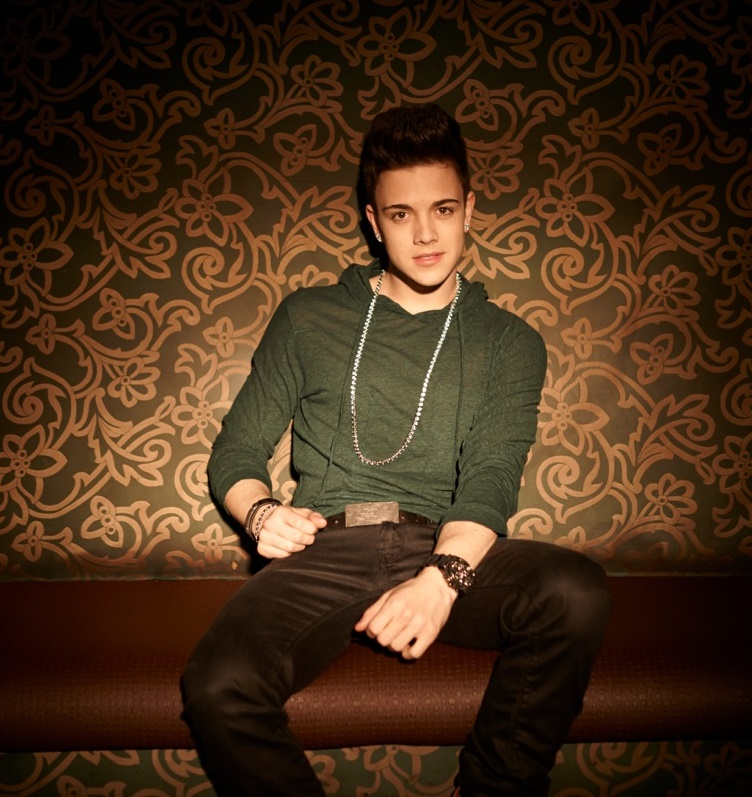
Hänni in 2013

In 2012, Hänni applied in the ninth season of the RTL singing talent show Deutschland sucht den Superstar, the German adaption of the Idol franchise. On 28 April 2012, he reached the final. There he competed against Daniele Negroni and won the show with 52.85 percent of the audience votes. At that time, Hänni became the only minor, moreover the first non-German DSDS-winner. As a prize he received 500,000 Euros and a recording contract with Universal Music Group. Additionally, he and runner up Negroni received a car and driver education courses. Hänni's debut single and coronation song "Don't Think About Me" was released on 2 May 2012. An instant success, the single reached gold status in Switzerland within its first four days of release and debuted atop the single charts in Austria, Germany, and Switzerland. This made Hänni the first Swiss citizen to reach number one on the German Singles Charts after 52 years. "Don't Think About Me" sold more than 100,000 copies throughout its chart run.

Hänni's debut album My Name Is Luca, chiefly produced Deutschland sucht den Superstar judge Dieter Bohlen, was released on 18 May 2012. Comprising a set of previously unreleased recordings as well as cover versions of Ed Sheeran, Justin Bieber and Kings of Leon and several other songs that he had sung on the show, it debuted at number one on the Austrian and Swiss Albums Chart, while reaching number two in Germany. Album cuts "Allein, allein" and "The A Team" moreover entered the Swiss Singles Chart. By August 2012, My Name Is Luca had been certified gold by the International Federation of the Phonographic Industry (IFPI) in Austria and Switzerland and spawned a second single, "I Will Die for You". In June 2012, Swiss trading company Migros engaged Hänni for its men's underwear brand Nick Tyler as a testimonial. In this context Migros published a series of underwear for men with the name Nick Tyler by Luca, for which Hänni worked as a model.

In August 2012, he opened the auditions to tenth season of Deutschland sucht den Superstar in his native city Bern, for which he was seen in an advertising campaign since July 2012. Hänni's first concert tour, Luca Hänni & Band – Live on Tour, began in Hoyerswerda on 1 October 2012. It included 32 concerts in Germany, Austria and Switzerland and ended in Dresden on 20 November. Due to high demand in Switzerland additional concerts in Zürich, Uetendorf and Amriswil were recognized. In December 2012, Hänni presented the RTL II program BRAVO The Hits 2012 – The Show. In 2013, Hänni received the Swiss Music Award for Best Breaking Act National as well as the Nickelodeon Kids' Choice Award in the category Favorite Star: Germany, Austria, and Switzerland. In addition, he received two nominations for the Prix Walo, winning both, and earned an ECHO Award nomination for Newcomer International.

=== 2014–2016: Dance Until We Die and When We Wake Up ===
Hänni collaborated with Swiss DJ Christopher S on his third album Dance Until We Die. Taking his work further into the dance pop genre, it was released on Future Soundz, a division of K-tel International under exclusive license from Hänni's own Luca Music, following his departure from Universal. The album debuted and peaked at number six in the Swiss Albums Chart, becoming his third consecutive top ten album to do so, and produced the singles "I Can't Get No Sleep" and "Good Time", both of which entered the top thirty of the Swiss Singles Chart. The project had several club appearances and toured through Germany, Austria and Switzerland. Promotion on the album was discontinued in August 2014 following a fall out between Hänni and Christopher S, regarding the share-out of Dance Until We Die's and merchandising profits.

In close cooperation with the DKMS, a German charity that works in the areas of blood cancer and hematopoietic stem cell transplantation, which he supports, Hänni wrote and released the song "Only One You" in November 2014. The same month, he collaborated with a variety of Swiss musicians, including Noëmi Nadelmann, Pepe Lienhard, Francine Jordi, Sebalter and Melanie Oesch, on Migros's charity Christmas song "Ensemble" which supports the needy in Switzerland. Inspired by charity supergroup Band Aid and their 1984 hit single "Do They Know It's Christmas?", it debuted atop the Swiss Singles Chart and reached platinum status. Also in fall 2014, Hönni participated in the SRF musical talent show Kampf der Orchester, serving as a full-fledged team-member of the Lucerne formation BML Talents. He won the title.

From mid-January to February 2015 Hänni relocated to Los Angeles where he recorded his fourth studio album When We Wake Up along with Swiss music producer Fabian Egger. Songwriters such as Gary Pinto, Andre Merritt, James Fauntleroy, and Tushar Apte contributed to the album, which documented his foray into R&B and electronic music, departing from the predominant pop and dance pop sound established from her previous studio releases. Released by Muve Recordings in September 2015, it debuted at number six on the Swiss Albums Chart, becoming his fourth consecutive top ten album in Switzerland, and produced the top forty single "Set the World on Fire." In 2016, he was a member of the Swiss jury in the Eurovision Song Contest 2016. In fall 2016, Hänni launched his own fashion label SVSL and had a minor role as a voice actor in the German version of the American animated musical film Sing.

=== 2017–present: Eurovision Song Contest, Dance, Dance, Dance and Let's Dance ===
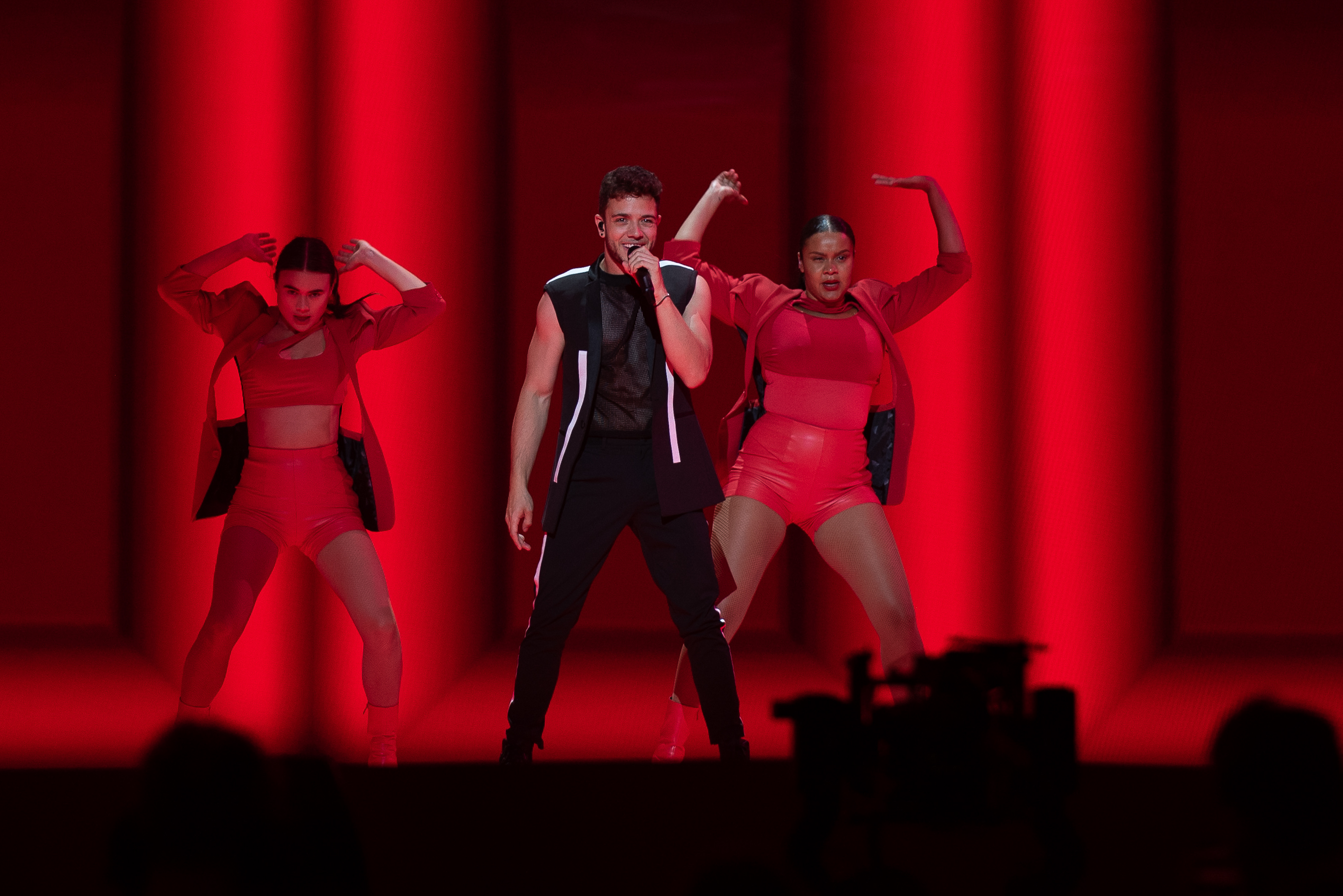
Hänni representing Switzerland with the song "She Got Me" in the Eurovision Song Contest 2019 in Tel Aviv.

In 2017, Hänni served as Switzerland's voting spokesperson in the Eurovision Song Contest 2017 which took place in Kyiv, Ukraine. The same year, he appeared as a contestant on the second season of the RTL competitive dancing talent show Dance Dance Dance, partnered with fellow Deutschland sucht den Superstar winner Prince Damien. Considered one of the show's frontrunners throughout the entire competition, he ultimately placed first in the competition in October 2017. In December 2018, he released the single "Bei mir" which he promoted with a dancing performance at the Helene Fischer Show the same month. The song failed to chart.

In March 2019, Hanni was announced as Switzerland's representative at Eurovision Song Contest 2019 in Tel-Aviv, Israel. Selected by Swiss broadcaster SRG SSR through an internal selection process, he performed the song "She Got Me", a dance pop song that combines rhythmic and Middle Eastern elements and was penned together with a team of national and international composers at a Swiss songwriting camp. On 16 May 2019, Hänni participated in the second semi-final of the Eurovision Song Contest, placing fourth in the semi-final with 232 points and qualifying for the final on 18 May. In the final, he placed fifth with televoters and seventh with international juries, amassing 364 points in total and coming in fourth. This marked Switzerland's highest result since Annie Cotton's "Moi, tout simplement" at the Eurovision Song Contest 1993. Also, "She Got Me" became Hänni's second number-one hit in Switzerland.

In September 2019, Hänni released the single "Bella Bella" which peaked at number 45 on the Swiss Singles Chart. In December 2019, he released the single "Nebenbei", followed by his 2020 single "Nie mehr allein." In February 2020, he won Best Male Act at the 13th Swiss Music Awards. Also that year, he finished third in the thirteenth season of the German talent series Let's Dance. His professional partner was Christina Luft. In May 2020, he released the single "Diamant," the lead single from his fifth studio album 110 Karat which was released in October 2020.

== Discography ==
- My Name Is Luca (2012)
- Living the Dream (2013)
- Dance Until We Die (2014)
- When We Wake Up (2015)
- 110 Karat (2020)

Awards and achievements
Preceded by Pietro Lombardi	Deutschland sucht den Superstar; Winner; Season 9 (2012)	Succeeded by Beatrice Egli
Preceded by Zibbz with "Stones"	Switzerland in the Eurovision Song Contest; 2019	Succeeded by Gjon's Tears with "Répondez-moi"
