= Darude discography =

Recordings by Finnish DJ and producer

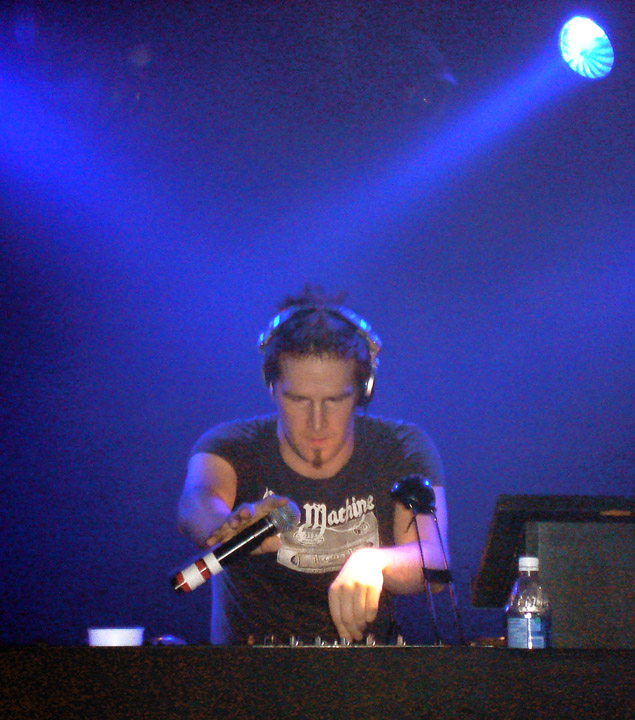
- Darude performing in Toronto, 2007
- Studio albums: 5
- Extended plays: 4
- Singles: 18
- Music videos: 7

The discography of Finnish DJ and music producer Darude consists of five studio albums, fourteen singles, and a multitude of remixes and other productions. His debut single, "Sandstorm", was an international breakthrough hit, peaking within the top ten in several countries. It has also gained recognition for its significant amount of usage in sporting events and popularity within internet meme culture. His second single, "Feel the Beat", was also a commercial success, peaking in the top twenty in multiple countries. Darude's debut studio album, Before the Storm, was released on 5 September 2000 and was a commercial success, as well. Darude released four studio albums following Before the Storm: Rush (2003), Label This! (2007), Moments (2015), and Together (2023).

== Albums ==
=== Studio albums ===
Title	Album details	Peak chart positions										Certifications
Title	Album details	FIN	AUS	CAN	FRA	GER	NOR	SWE	UK	US Dance	US Indie	Certifications
Before the Storm	Release date: 18 September 2000; Label: 16 Inch Records; Formats: CD, CS, digital download	1	36	18	34	35	14	9	— (Note: Before the Storm did not enter the UK Albums Chart, but peaked at number 47 on the Official Independent Albums Chart)	6	11	IFPI FIN: Platinum
Rush	Release date: 15 July 2003; Label: 16 Inch Records; Formats: CD, digital download	4	—	—	—	—	—	—	—	11	—	
Label This!	Release date: 27 October 2007; Label: Helsinki Music Company; Formats: CD, digital download	—	—	—	—	—	—	—	—	—	—	
Moments	Release date: 14 August 2015; Label: Warner Music Finland; Formats: CD, digital download	31	—	—	—	—	—	—	—	—	—	
Together	Release date: 3 November 2023; Label: Vibing Out; Formats: CD, digital download	—	—	—	—	—	—	—	—	—		
"—" denotes releases that did not chart

== Singles ==
Title	Year	Peak chart positions										Certifications	Album
Title	Year	FIN	AUS	AUT	FRA	GER	NLD	NOR	SWE	UK	US	Certifications	Album
"Sandstorm"	1999	3	40	13	14	6	8	1	6	3	83	IFPI FIN: Platinum; BPI: 3× Platinum; BVMI: Platinum; IFPI SWE: Gold; RIAA: Platinum	Before the Storm
"Feel the Beat"	2000	1	20	24	25	18	19	18	18	5	—	ARIA: Gold	Before the Storm
"Out of Control (Back for More)"	2001	12	45	50	72	42	—	—	52	13	—		Before the Storm
"Music"	2003	1	—	—	—	77	88	—	51	—	—		Rush
"Next to You"	2003	1	—	—	—	—	—	—	—	—	—		Rush
"Tell Me"	2007	1	—	—	—	—	—	—	—	—	—		Label This!
"My Game"	2007	4	—	—	—	—	—	—	—	—	—		Label This!
"In the Darkness"	2008	—	—	—	—	—	—	—	—	—	—		Label This!
"Selfless" (featuring Blake Lewis)	2008	—	—	—	—	—	—	—	—	—	—		Dance4Life
"I Ran (So Far Away)" (featuring Blake Lewis)	2008	—	—	—	—	—	—	—	—	—	—		Label This! (US Edition)
"Beautiful Alien" (featuring AI AM)	2015	—	—	—	—	—	—	—	—	—	—		Moments
"Moments" (featuring Sebastian Rejman)	2016	—	—	—	—	—	—	—	—	—	—		Moments
"Singularity" (with Zac Waters featuring Enya Angel)	2017	—	—	—	—	—	—	—	—	—	—		Non-album singles
"Surrender" (with Ashley Wallbridge featuring Foux)	2018	—	—	—	—	—	—	—	—	—	—		Non-album singles
"Timeless" (featuring Jvmie)	2018	—	—	—	—	—	—	—	—	—	—		Non-album singles
"Release Me" (featuring Sebastian Rejman)	2019	—	—	—	—	—	—	—	—	—	—		Uuden Musiikin Kilpailu 2019
"Superman" (featuring Sebastian Rejman)	2019	—	—	—	—	—	—	—	—	—	—		Uuden Musiikin Kilpailu 2019
"Look Away" (featuring Sebastian Rejman)	2019	—	—	—	—	—	—	—	—	—	—		Uuden Musiikin Kilpailu 2019
"Hide" (with Audioventura & Jvmie)	2019	—	—	—	—	—	—	—	—	—	—		Non-album single
"—" denotes a single that did not chart or was not released in that territory.

== Official remixes and other productions ==
The following is an incomplete list of official remixes released by Darude, with year of remix release, original artist(s), and remix name.

- 2000: Rising Star – "Touch Me (Darude Remix)"
- 2000: Rising Star – "Touch Me (Darude's Sandstorm Mix)"
- 2000: Blank & Jones – "Beyond Time" (Darude vs. JS16 Remix)
- 2000: Boom! – "Boy Versus Girls" (Darude vs. JS16 Remix)
- 2000: Barcode Brothers – "Dooh Dooh" (Darude vs. JS16 Remix)
- 2000: JDS – "Nine Ways" (Darude vs. JS16 Remix)
- 2000: Waldo's People – "No-Man's-Land" (Darude vs. JS16 Remix)
- 2000: Waldo's People – "1000 Ways" (Darude vs. JS16 Remix)
- 2000: ATB featuring York – "The Fields of Love" (Darude vs. JS16 Remix)
- 2000: Safri Duo – "Played-A-Live (The Bongo Song) (Darude vs. JS16 Remix)
- 2000: The Thrillseekers – "Synaesthesia (Darude vs. JS16 Remix)
- 2001: Bleachin' – "Peakin'" (Darude vs. JS16 Short Version)
- 2001: Bleachin' – "Peakin'" (Darude vs. JS16 Long Version)
- 2001: JS16 – "Stomping System" (Darude vs. JS16 Remix)
- 2002: DJ Aligator – "Lollipop" (Darude vs. JS16 Remix)
- 2003: Gizelle – "Falling Over You" (Darude vs. JS16 Remix)
- 2004: Klamydia – "Darude's Aleksi Mutation"
- 2008: Kenneth Thomas – "Stronger Creature" (Darude Remix)
- 2009: Randy Boyer and Kristina Sky feat. Cari Golden – "No Limit" (Darude Remix)
- 2009: Alex Kunnari – "Eternity" (Darude Remix)
- 2010: J. Nitti featuring Rowetta – "No More Comin' Down" (Darude Remix)
- 2010: Darude and Weirdness featuring Jo Angel – "Katson Autiota Hiekkarantaa"
- 2010: 2AM and Darude featuring Georgia Haege – "Crazy World"
- 2011: Paul Corson – "Midnight Train" (Darude Original Mix)
- 2011: Paul Corson – "Midnight Train" (Darude Alternative Mix)
- 2011: Randy Boyer – "Brain Dysfunction" (Darude Remix)
- 2011: Weirdness featuring Amy Hamblin – "Rain Falls On Me" (Darude Remix)
- 2011: Kristina Sky and Randy Boyer featuring ShyBoy – "Welcome To The Future" (Darude and Randy Boyer Remix)
- 2011: Randy Boyer featuring Cari Golden – "Fragile" (Weirdness and Darude Remix)
- 2011: Randy Boyer, 2AM and Darude featuring Georgia Haege – "Monster" vs. "Crazy World" (Darude Mash-up)
- 2011: Weirdness – "Morning After" (Darude Remix)
- 2012: Jonas Hornblad – "A Minor Thing" (Weirdness and Darude Remix)
- 2012: Miss Thunderpussy - "Rub Me" (EMM Progressive Remix) (with Randy Boyer and Weirdness)
- 2013: Lowland & Orkidea - "Blackbird" (Darude Remix)
- 2014: Robin - "Erilaiset" (Darude 'Maxed' Remix)
- 2016: Andain - "Beautiful Things" (Heikki L and Darude Remix)
- 2016: Ari Pulkkinen - "Mighty League Anthem" (Sandstorm Remix)
- 2017: Max Millian - "You Are The One" (Darude Remix)
- 2019: Paenda - "Limits" (Darude Remix)
