= Label This! =

Studio album by Darude
- Released: 27 October 2007
- Recorded: 2005–2007
- Genre: EDM
- Length: 78:15
- Label: Helsinki Music Company

Darude chronology
Rush (2003)	Label This! (2007)	Moments (2015)

Label This! is the third studio album from Finnish trance DJ Darude. Released on 24 October 2007 in Finland and on 27 October in Europe, the American edition was released in 2008, with the notable inclusion of Darude's newest single, "I Ran (So Far Away)" featuring Blake Lewis, as the third track on the album. The tech mix of "Stars" has also been cut, keeping the number of tracks at 12. Unlike Darude's two previous album releases, this one did not chart, though the reviews were positive, with Gawker writing that the album's single "In the Darkness" "is a floating, gossamer piece of trance music of the kind AraabMuzik spun into such magic on Electronic Dream. Like 'Sandstorm,' it's tightly composed, easy to dance to, and has a soaring, undeniable hook."

== Track listing ==
=== Europe ===
1. "My Game" – 4:30
2. "Tell Me" – 6:39
3. "Stars (Here with Me)" – 6:27
4. "Good Grooves" – 5:35
5. "In the Darkness" (Tech Mix) – 7:08
6. "Bad" – 6:21
7. "Label This!" – 4:49
8. "Lost" – 5:30
9. "For Those I Love" – 8:02
10. "Dreams" – 7:00
11. "Stars (Here with Me)" (Tech Mix) – 8:08
12. "In the Darkness" (Trance Mix) – 8:06

=== American ===
1. "My Game" – 4:30
2. "Tell Me" – 6:41
3. "I Ran (So Far Away)" (featuring Blake Lewis) – 6:19
4. "Stars (Here with Me)" (Tech mix) – 6:12
5. "Good Grooves" – 5:33
6. "In the Darkness" (Tech Mix) – 7:07
7. "Bad" – 6:21
8. "Label This!" – 4:49
9. "Lost" – 5:30
10. "For Those I Love" – 8:02
11. "Dreams" – 6:58
12. "In the Darkness" (Trance Mix) – 8:07
