= Darude =

Finnish DJ and producer (born 1975)

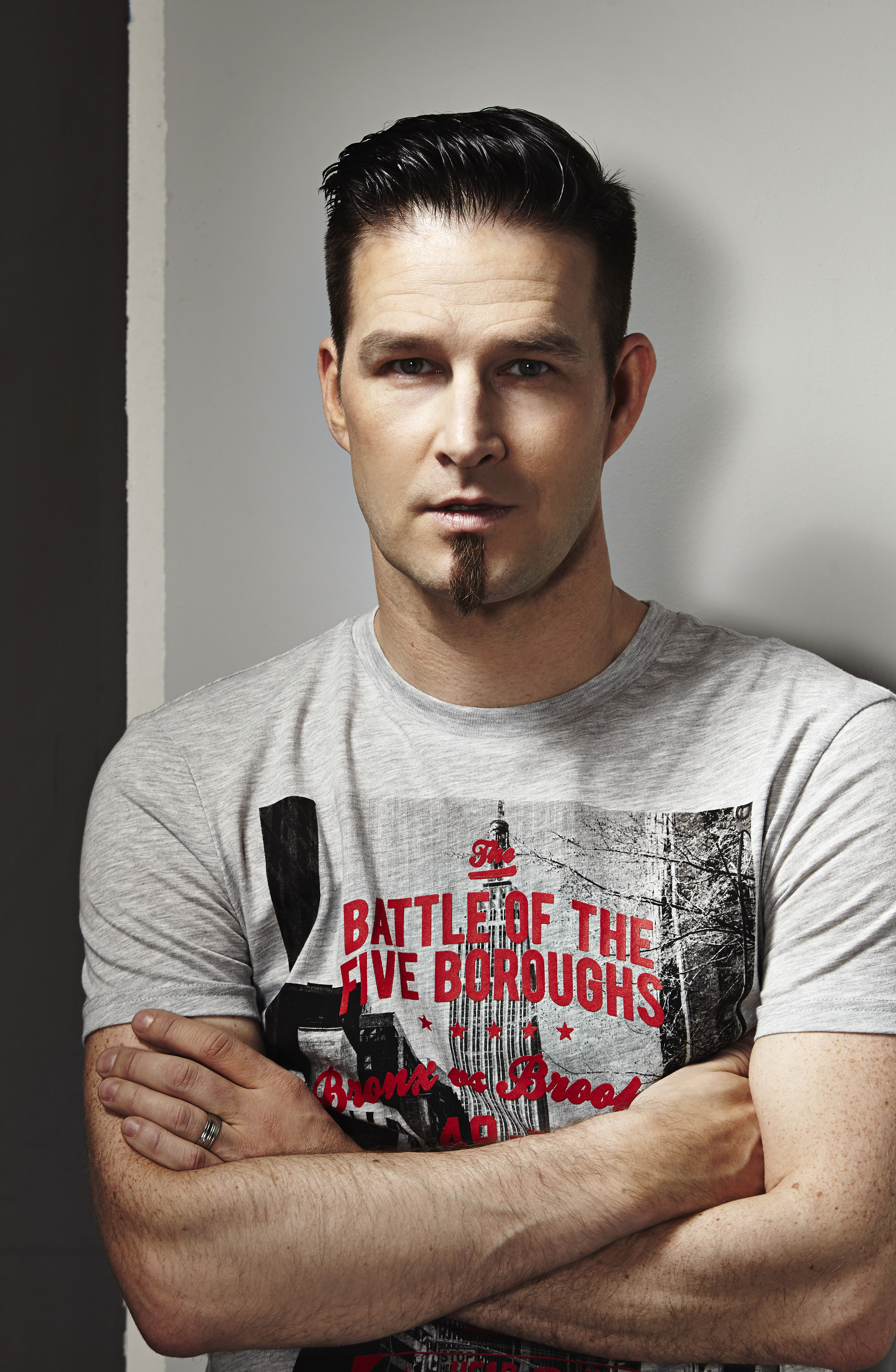
- Darude in 2014

Background information
- Also known as: Rude Boy; Da Rude
- Born: Toni-Ville Henrik Virtanen; 17 July 1975 (age 51); Eura, Satakunta, Finland
- Origin: Turku, Finland
- Genres: EDM; trance; house
- Occupations: DJ; record producer
- Years active: 1997–present
- Labels: Vibing Out; EnMass; Warner Finland; Helsinki; 16 Inch; Robbins; Sony Music
- Website: darude.com

Toni-Ville Henrik Virtanen (Finnish: [ˈtoniˌʋilːe ˈhenrik ˈʋirtɑnen]; born 17 July 1975), better known by his stage name Darude (/dəˈruːd/), is a Finnish DJ and record producer from Eura, Satakunta. His music is characterised by its progressive/uplifting style. He started making music in 1995 and released the platinum-selling hit single "Sandstorm" in late 1999. His debut studio album, Before the Storm, was released on 18 September 2000, and sold 800,000 copies worldwide, earning Darude three Finnish Grammy Awards. It peaked at number one on Finland's Official List and number 6 on the Billboard Dance/Electronic Albums chart in the United States. Darude's second studio album, Rush, reached number 11 on the Billboard dance chart in 2003 and number 4 on weekly album chart in Finland.

His third studio album, Label This! was released in 2007. Though it did not chart as high as his previous albums, Gawker praised the album's single "In the Darkness" as "a floating, gossamer piece of trance music... it's tightly composed, easy to dance to, and has a soaring, undeniable hook." In 2011, he co-founded the record label EnMass Music, through which he has released a number of mix compilations related to his radio show Salmiakki Sessions. After performing at festivals such as the tenth anniversary of Tomorrowland in 2014 and Future Music Festival in 2015, he released his most recent studio album, Moments, on August 14, 2015, followed by a tour of the United States and Canada in September 2015. He represented Finland in the Eurovision Song Contest 2019, alongside singer Sebastian Rejman, with the song "Look Away".

== Career ==
=== 1990s: Early years and "Sandstorm" ===
Toni-Ville Henrik Virtanen was born on 17 July 1975, in the Finnish village of Hinnerjoki in Eura. Virtanen started his career as a musician while studying at Turku Polytechnic, making music using his PC's tracker software. As his interest in music production rapidly grew, he moved on to more serious production techniques. While at a classmate's party, Virtanen played the song "Rude Boy" (written by Swedish artist Leila K) several times in a row. This earned him the nickname "Rude Boy," which gradually morphed into "Da Rude" and then "Darude". Active in the Finnish music trance and house scene since 1995, Virtanen continued producing music into the 1990s. He began occasionally releasing demos to radio stations beginning in 1997, and offering his music for download on MP3.com, making him an early adopter of online file sharing for music promotion.

In 1999, he gave a demo for the track "Sandstorm" to his producer, JS16 (Jaakko Salovaara). Virtanen signed on with JS16's 16 Inch Records label, and shortly thereafter, "Sandstorm" was released as a single. "Sandstorm" was a hit internationally, selling platinum and holding the No. 1 spot on the Finnish Dance Chart for seventeen consecutive weeks. After becoming the No. 3 single in the United Kingdom (becoming the first record by a Finnish artist to do so), "Sandstorm" eventually sold 2 million units worldwide, and was the world's biggest selling 12-inch single in 2000. The song went on to be widely featured in the media, particularly at sporting events and on soundtracks for video games and television shows. Various videos and live streams of "Sandstorm" had gathered some 60 million hits by December 2014, and in October 2015, the track achieved platinum sales status in the UK as it surpassed 600,000 sales in the UK.

His first live gig was on 5 December 1999, in Tampere, Finland.

=== 2000–06: Before the Storm and Rush ===
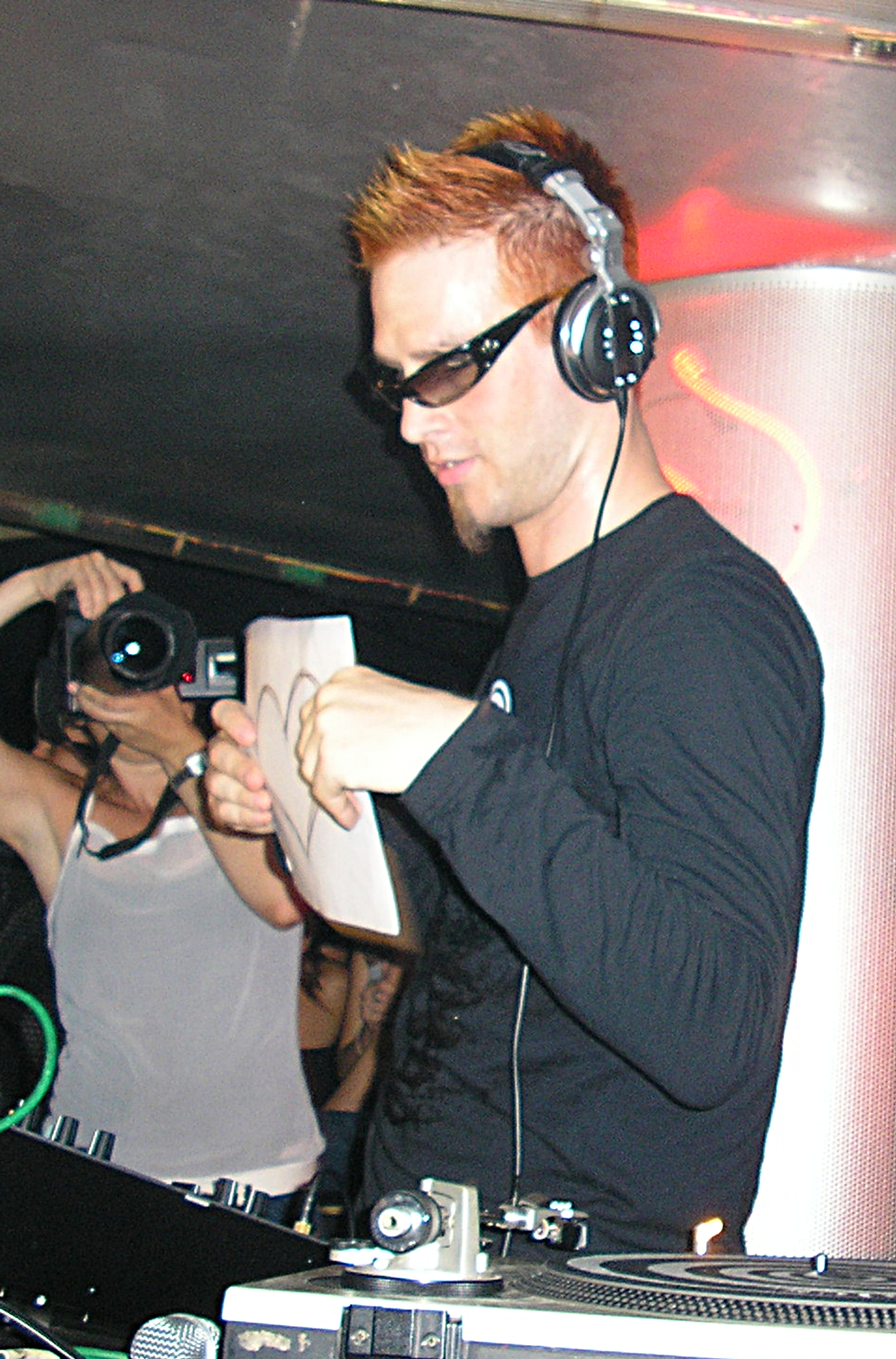
Darude in 2004

Darude's debut studio album Before the Storm was produced by JS16 (Jaakko Salovaara), and features two of JS16's remixes. The album includes several singles, including "Sandstorm." The second single "Feel the Beat" had replicated the success of "Sandstorm", reaching No. 1 on the singles charts in Finland for 2 weeks and No. 5 on the UK Singles Chart. Before the Storm was released on September 5, 2000, and sold 800,000 copies worldwide, earning Darude three Finnish Grammy awards. It also peaked on a number of charts, including No. 1 on Finland's Official List for albums, No. 6 on the Billboard Dance/Electronic Albums chart and No. 11 on the US Independent Albums chart. It also charted at No. 9 in Sweden, No. 14 in Norway, and No. 18 in Canada, among other rankings. Shortly after the album's release, Darude created a vocal edit of "Out of Control", and released it as a single; "Out of Control (Back for More)". This single also charted in major countries and was re-released on several editions of the album.

Darude began a world tour in 2001, releasing Before the Storm: Australian Tour Edition in the process. 2002 saw the release of Before the Storm: Special Edition, featuring a collection of remixes of Darude's work.

After releasing the singles "Music" and "Next to You" in early 2003, in July of that year both tracks were included on Darude's second album, Rush. The album reached No. 11 on the Billboard Top Electronic Albums chart and No. 4 on weekly album chart in Finland, while "Next to You" charted at No. 1 on the Finnish singles chart. MacKenzie Wilson of Allmusic criticized the lack of variety between tracks but praised the release in general, writing that Darude "builds upon the dynamics of Before the Storm, raises the pressure, and fuels the flame for an electrifying dozen-track set. Darude's talent in keeping the energy at an elevated level without losing touch with the album's overall ambience is what makes him a star and an integral part of the new-millennium dance scene. His classy of[sic] mix of techno and trance is perfected into a fashionably slick spiral of synthesized heat." After the release of Rush Darude maintained a heavy touring schedule, particularly the United States and Eastern Europe.

=== 2007–12: Label This! and EnMass Music ===
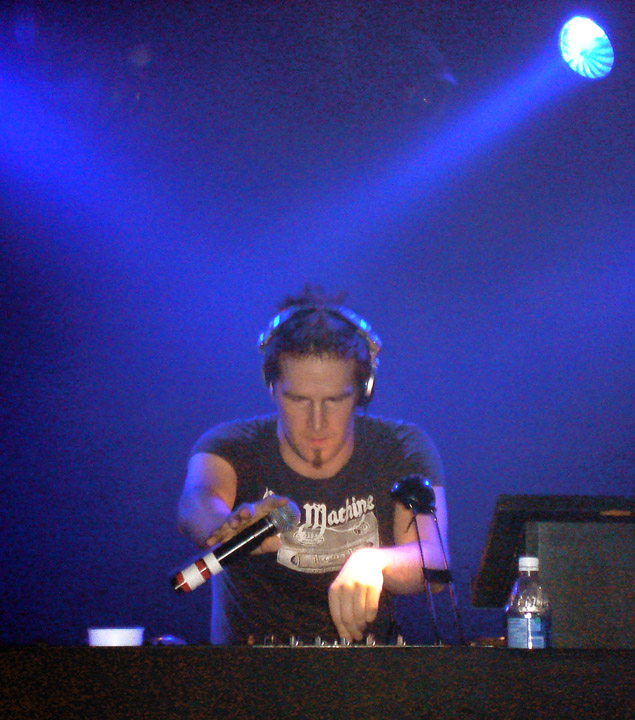
Darude in Toronto, 2007

His single "Tell Me" was released in Finland on April 11, 2007, and "My Game" on September 19, 2007. Label This! is the third studio album from Darude. Released on October 24, 2007, in Finland and on October 27 in Europe, the American edition was released in 2008, with the notable inclusion of Darude's newest single, "I Ran (So Far Away)" featuring Blake Lewis, as the third track on the album. The album did not chart as high as Darude's two previous album releases, though Gawker wrote that the album's single "In the Darkness" "is a floating, gossamer piece of trance music of the kind AraabMuzik spun into such magic on Electronic Dream. Like 'Sandstorm,' it's tightly composed, easy to dance to, and has a soaring, undeniable hook."

Darude was ranked No. 96 on the DJ List as of December 11, 2010 and No. 314 in the DJ Mag Top 100. He has also recently completed remixes for artists such as ATB and The Thrillseekers, with radio play from Radio 1 personalities such as Pete Tong, Judge Jules, Ferry Corsten, and Paul Oakenfold. Darude co-founded the record label EnMass Music in 2011. Through EnMass Music, Darude released a DJ mix compilation titled Salmiakki Sessions Vol. 1 on December 20, 2011. The compilation is a reflection of his namesake radio mix show, and includes ten of his recent remix productions and eight of his track redone by Finnish artists and producers. Five of the tracks are previously unreleased exclusives for the compilation. He took part in a label showcase for EnMasse in Amsterdam in October 2012.

=== 2013–15: Touring and Moments ===
External videos
- Darude feat. AI AM - "Beautiful Alien" Official Music Video on YouTube (March 31, 2015)

Darude continued to tour into 2013, performing that year at the Groove Cruise out of Miami and playing two days of Tomorrowland in July 2014 in Belgium. In March 2015 he performed at Future Music Festival in Australia, playing at all five festival dates in Sydney, Melbourne, Brisbane, Adelaide and Perth, also playing a variety of sideshows at clubs as part of the festival.

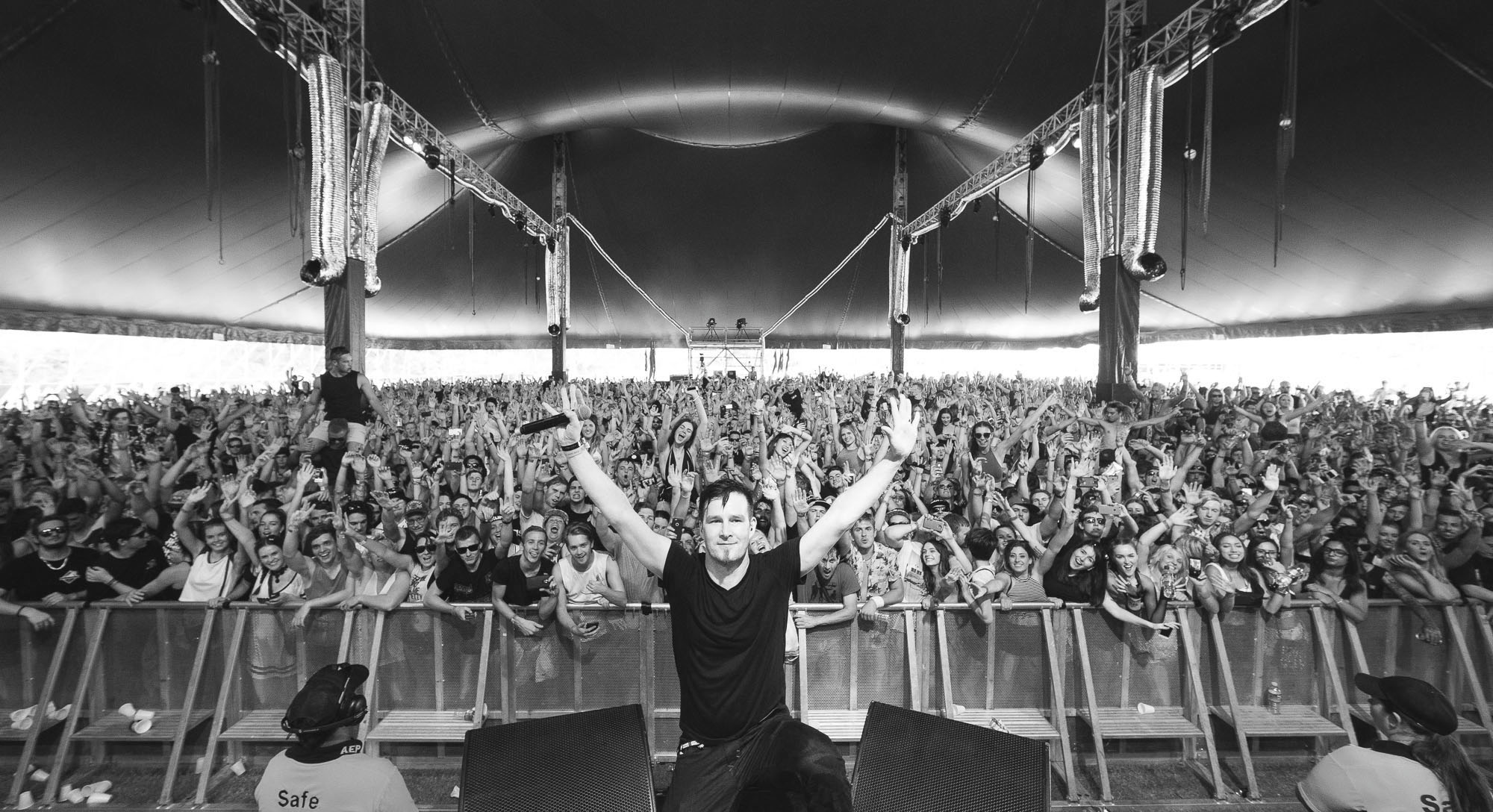
Darude performing at Future Music Festival in Perth in 2015

Darude's most recent studio album, Moments, was his first full-length release in eight years. Guest artists included Caater and string band Apocalyptica, among others. The lead single from the album, "Beautiful Alien," had previously charted at No. 1 on the Finnish iTunes charts, with a music video released as well in March 2015. Moments was officially released on August 14, 2015, through Warner Music Finland in Europe and overseas.

The album blends genres such as electro, progressive house, and We Rave You wrote that "Darude's ability is once again proven filling the spectrum from big-room to trance to dubstep-infused depth." The album's mixing of genres was generally well-received, and Dancing Astronaut praised the release, writing that "Darude’s return is a clear departure from what once defined him. In Moments, he steps outside the proverbial EDM box by toying around with a multitude of different styles, several of which appear simultaneously in each track." YourEDM opined that the album was "gorgeous," explaining that it "features a wide variety of influences and sounds" with "great production, atmospheres, and melodies riding alongside quaintly catchy vocals."

Shortly following the album's release in September 2015, Darude embarked on a ten date tour of the United States and Canada, culminating in a performance at the inaugural TwitchCon, a gaming and tech convention organised by video streaming platform Twitch and held in San Francisco on September 25 and 26, 2015. With over 20,000 attendees over the weekend, Darude appeared as the headline DJ at the official afterparty, held in the Bill Graham Civic Auditorium on September 26, 2015, and also featuring a performance from Deadmau5. In the run up to the event, Darude appeared as a guest in the Deadmau5 Coffee Run series, chatting to the Canadian DJ about various topics while being driven in Deadmau5's Lamborghini Huracán supercar. Deadmau5 noted that "You [Darude] and a very select few others are responsible for the influx of electronic music into North America. It was 'Sandstorm' – I'm totally being serious... that's what all the clubs were hitting on. That's the first time [electronic music] became less 'underground and cool'... there wasn't anything before that".

=== 2019: Eurovision Song Contest ===
On January 29, 2019, Darude was announced as the Finnish representative for the Eurovision Song Contest 2019 in Tel Aviv, Israel. He performed alongside Sebastian Rejman, and his entry "Look Away" was decided in a special edition of Uuden Musiikin Kilpailu. They performed third in the first semi-final at Eurovision, but was placed last among the 17 countries competing in the semi-final, thus failing to qualify for the grand final.

== Awards and nominations ==
Selected awards won by Darude
Year	Award	Nominated work	Category	Result
2000	Finnish Grammy Awards	Darude	Best Dance / Hip Hop Newcomer	Won
2000	Finnish Grammy Awards	Before the Storm	Best Debut Album	Won
2000	Finnish Grammy Awards	"Sandstorm"	Song of the Year	Won
2000	NRJ Radio Award (Sweden)	"Sandstorm"	Best Dance Track of the Year	Won
2000	German Dance Awards	"Sandstorm"	Dance Hit of the Year	Won
2000	German Dance Awards	Darude	Best International Single Act	Won
2001	Dance Star (UK)	Darude	Breakthrough Act of the Year	Won
2002	Golden Turntable DJ Awards	"Sandstorm"	Best Single	Won

== Discography ==
Studio albums

- Before the Storm (2000)
- Rush (2003)
- Label This! (2007)
- Moments (2015)
- Together (2023)

== Personal life ==
Darude has a son (born 2009) and a daughter (born 2017) with his American wife, Michelle. He lived in Atlanta, in the United States, from the late 2000s to 2013. As of 2013, Darude has lived in Salo, Finland, with his family.

== See also ==
- List of trance musicians

Awards and achievements
Preceded by Saara Aalto with "Monsters"	Finland in the Eurovision Song Contest; 2019	Succeeded by Aksel Kankaanranta with "Looking Back"
