= Kankaanranta =

Kankaanranta is a Finnish surname. It may refer to:

- Aksel Kankaanranta (born 1998), Finnish singer who would've represented Finland in the Eurovision Song Contest 2020
- Tellervo Kankaanranta, birthname of Tellervo Koivisto (born 1929), Finnish politician, former First Lady of Finland from 1982 to 1994
