= Out of Control (Back for More) =

2001 single by Darude

Single by Darude

from the album Before the Storm
- B-side: "Remixes"
- Released: 1 February 2001
- Length: 5:00 (original); 3:38 ("Back for More")
- Label: 16 Inch (Finland); Neo (UK); Urban (Germany)
- Songwriter(s): Jaakko Salovaara
- Producer(s): Ville Virtanen; Jaakko Salovaara

Darude singles chronology
"Feel the Beat" (2000)	"Out of Control (Back for More)" (2001)	"Music" (2003)

Music video
- "Out of Control (Back for More)" on YouTube

"Out of Control (Back for More)" is a song by Finnish DJ and record producer Darude. The song is a vocal edit of "Out of Control", an instrumental from his debut studio album Before the Storm. The edit was released on many re-releases of Before the Storm, and was included as the opening track on the 2001 special edition.

The song failed to reach number one in Finland, unlike his previous single "Feel the Beat", however it saw success regardless and charted internationally, reaching number 13 in the UK Singles Chart.

== Music video ==
A music video was filmed for "Out of Control (Back for More)". The video was produced by Filmitalli and directed by Misko Iho. It was filmed in Helsinki at Yrjönkadun Uimahalli. The video features female swimmers in a swimming pool, and also features Darude sitting in a chair under the water. The video ends with a reversed shot of Darude rising out of the pool.

== Track listings ==
"Out of Control" – CD single
No.	Title	Length
1.	"Out of Control" (Radio Version)	3:24
2.	"Out of Control" (Extended Version)	7:09
3.	"Out of Control" (Bostik Remix)	8:39

"Out of Control (Back for More)" – CD single
No.	Title	Length
1.	"Out of Control (Back for More)" (Radio Edit)	3:38
2.	"Out of Control (Back for More)" (Extended Version)	6:12
3.	"Out of Control (Back for More)" (JS16 Remix)	7:07
4.	"Sandstorm" (Jan Driver Remix)	6:52

"Out of Control (Back for More)" – 12" single
No.	Title	Length
1.	"Sandstorm" (Superchumbo's Sandy Sandstorm)	3:24
2.	"Sandstorm" (Jan Driver Remix)	7:09
3.	"Out Of Control (Back For More)" (Radio Edit)	8:39

== Charts ==
Chart (2001)	Peak position
Australia (ARIA)	45
Austria (Ö3 Austria Top 40)	50
Denmark (Tracklisten)	76
Finland (Suomen virallinen lista)	12
France (SNEP)	72
Germany (GfK)	42
Ireland (IRMA)	44
Ireland Dance (IRMA)	7
Scotland (OCC)	8
Spain (PROMUSICAE)	19
Sweden (Sverigetopplistan)	52
UK Singles (OCC)	13
UK Dance (OCC)	9
UK Indie (OCC)	2
