= Moments (Darude album) =

Studio album by Darude
- Released: 14 August 2015
- Genre: Electro house; electronic dance music
- Length: 52:32
- Label: Warner Music Finland
- Producer: Darude

Darude chronology
Label This! (2007)	Moments (2015)	Together (2023)

Singles from Moments
- 1. "Beautiful Alien" Released: March 20, 2015; 2. "Moments" Released: May 11, 2016

Moments is the fourth studio album from Finnish record producer and DJ Darude. It was released on August 14, 2015, through Warner Music Finland. His first album release in eight years, the album and its mixing of genres met with praise from music critics, with Dancing Astronaut writing that Darude "steps outside the proverbial EDM box by toying around with a multitude of different styles, several of which appear simultaneously in each track."

== Production and release ==
The release marked Darude's first full-length album release in eight years. The lead single from the album, "Beautiful Alien", had previously charted at No. 1 on the Finnish iTunes charts. A music video for the track was released as well. On August 13, the entire album streamed live on the website Dancing Astronaut. It was officially released on August 14, 2015, through Warner Music Finland. It was immediately made available in Canada, United States, United Kingdom, Japan, Europe, and other countries via iTunes.

== Reception ==
YourEDM wrote in a mixed review that the album was "gorgeous", explaining that it "features a wide variety of influences and sounds" with "great production, atmospheres, and melodies riding alongside quaintly catchy vocals." The album's mixing of genres was generally well-received, and Dancing Astronaut praised the release, with reviewer Christina Hernandez writing that "Darude’s return is a clear departure from what once defined him. In Moments, he steps outside the proverbial EDM box by toying around with a multitude of different styles, several of which appear simultaneously in each track."

His mixing of genres also received praise from music publication The Music Essentials, which writes that "his latest LP includes tracks from genres like electro and progressive house." We Rave You wrote that "Darude’s ability is once again proven filling the spectrum from big-room to trance to dubstep-infused depth."

In 2015, the popular online video game Counter-Strike: Global Offensive made by Valve added a music kit allowing players to replace the current music in the game with songs from Moments.

== Track listing ==
All music is composed by Darude.

No.	Title	Length
1.	"Beautiful Alien" (radio edit) (featuring AI AM)	3:18
2.	"Be with You Tonight" (featuring Will Sly)	3:17
3.	"Coming Home" (featuring Mahan Moin)	3:16
4.	"Moments" (featuring Sebastian Reyman)	3:44
5.	"Warrior"	4:01
6.	"Supersized" (with Caater)	5:56
7.	"One Lifetime" (featuring Sebastian Reyman)	4:07
8.	"Turn the Light On" (featuring Will Sly)	6:03
9.	"Till I Could Find" (with Weirdness)	6:57
10.	"Peace Revisited" (with Apocalyptica)	7:20
11.	"No More Tears to Cry" (featuring Kristina Wheeler)	4:33
Total length:		52:32

== Charts ==
Chart (2015)	Peak position
Finnish Albums (Suomen virallinen lista)	31
