= The Remixes, Vol. 1 =

Compilation album by AraabMuzik
- Released: July 9, 2013
- Genre: Electronic, dance
- Label: Ultra Records

AraabMuzik chronology
For Professional Use Only (2013)	The Remixes, Vol. 1 (2013)

Professional ratings
Aggregate scores
Source	Rating
Metacritic	66/100
Review scores
Source	Rating
Pitchfork	7.2/10

The Remixes, Volume 1 is a compilation album by musician AraabMuzik. It was released in July 2013 under Ultra Records.

== Track list ==
No.	Title	Artist	Length
1.	"Sierra Leone" (featuring Freshlyground)	Mt Eden	2:45
2.	"Bad Habits"	Brass Knuckles	2:41
3.	"Cudi the Kid" (featuring Kid Cudi & Travis Barker)	Steve Aoki	3:29
4.	"Keep In Motion"	AraabMuzik	4:37
5.	"Still My Baby" (featuring Omarion)	Wolfgang Gartner	3:06
6.	"Cinema" (featuring Skrillex)	Benny Benassi	4:04
7.	"Cognitive Dissonance"	Wolfgang Gartner	2:45
8.	"Chronicles of a Fallen Love" (featuring Greta Svabo Bech)	The Bloody Beetroots	5:24
9.	"Darkside"	AraabMuzik	3:38
10.	"Heartbeat"	Taana Gardner	3:24
11.	"Keep In Motion" (featuring Chase N. Cashe)	AraabMuzik	4:00
