= Aksel Kankaanranta =

Finnish singer

Aksel
- Born: Aksel Kankaanranta; 28 January 1998 (age 28); Turku, Finland
- Occupation: Singer
- Instrument: Vocals
- Years active: 2017–present

Aksel Kankaanranta (born 28 January 1998) is a Finnish singer. He was due to represent Finland in the Eurovision Song Contest 2020 in Rotterdam with the song "Looking Back", before the event was cancelled due to the COVID-19 pandemic. In 2017, he finished second in The Voice of Finland. He was born in Turku.

== Eurovision Song Contest ==
Aksel Kankaanranta was scheduled to represent Finland at the Eurovision Song Contest 2020 in Rotterdam with the song "Looking Back" after winning the Finnish national selection Uuden Musiikin Kilpailu, but then on 18 March, it was cancelled because of the Coronavirus pandemic. Later that month, the Finnish national broadcaster, Yle, announced they would not internally select Aksel, and he would have to participate in UMK 2021. In episode 2 of Eurovision Home Concerts, Kankaanranta confirmed that he would audition for the 2021 edition of the national selection.

Aksel participated in the national selection for Finland in the Eurovision Song Contest 2021 with his song "Hurt". This time, he finished 5th in the final.

Kankaanranta announced the Finnish jury votes at the Eurovision Song Contest 2022.

== Discography ==
=== Studio albums ===
Title	Details
Mustarastas	Released: 30 January 2026; Label: Playground Music; Formats: Digital download, streaming

=== Singles ===
==== As lead artist ====
Title	Year	Peak chart positions	Album or EP
Title	Year	FIN	Album or EP
"Looking Back"	2020	25	Non-album singles
"Muista kuka oot"	2020	30	Non-album singles
"Hurt"	2021	100	Non-album singles
"Sydän paareilla"	2021	—	Non-album singles
"Vielä sä löydät mun luo"	2022	—	Non-album singles
"Ilman sua"	2023	—	Non-album singles
"Mad World" (with Akras)	2023	—	Non-album singles
"Adoring You" (with s m s n)	2024	—	Non-album singles
"Hajonneet"	2024	—	Mustarastas
"Valonsäteet"	2024	—	Mustarastas
"Elää ikuisesti"	2025	—	Mustarastas
"Helpottaa"	2025	—	Mustarastas
"—" denotes a recording that did not chart or was not released in that territory.

==== As featured artist ====
Title	Year	Peak chart positions	Album or EP
Title	Year	FIN	Album or EP
"Jättiläinen" (Pyhimys featuring Aksel Kankaanranta)	2018	16	Tapa poika
"Kaupunki ei tiedä mun nimee" (Prinssi Rohkea ja Erämaan Rotat featuring Aksel Kankaanranta)	2019	—	Yhä unessa
"Matkustaja" (Ahti featuring Aksel Kankaanranta)	2021	11	Non-album single
"Joka päivä ja joka ikinen yö" (Heikki Kuula featuring Aksel Kankaanranta)	2023	—	0 tykkää tästä
"—" denotes a recording that did not chart or was not released in that territory.

Awards and achievements
Preceded by Darude feat. Sebastian Rejman with "Look Away"	Finland in the Eurovision Song Contest; 2020 (cancelled)	Succeeded by Blind Channel with "Dark Side"
