= Rush (Darude album) =

Studio album by Darude
- Released: July 15, 2003
- Recorded: 2000–2003
- Genre: Trance; EDM
- Length: 70:00
- Label: 16 Inch

Darude chronology
Before the Storm (2000)	Rush (2003)	Label This! (2007)

Singles from Rush
- 1. "Music" Released: 2003; 2. "Next to You" Released: April 11, 2003

Rush is the second studio album by Finnish DJ and record producer Darude. It was released on July 15, 2003. It peaked at number four on The Official Finnish Charts.

== Reception ==
Professional ratings
Review scores
Source	Rating
Allmusic	2/5 stars

MacKenzie Wilson of Allmusic praised the release in general, writing that Darude "builds upon the dynamics of Before the Storm, raises the pressure, and fuels the flame for an electrifying dozen-track set. Darude's talent in keeping the energy at an elevated level without losing touch with the album's overall ambience is what makes him a star and an integral part of the new-millennium dance scene. His classy mix of techno and trance is perfected into a fashionably slick spiral of synthesized heat." However, the review criticized the lack of variety between tracks, and gave it a generally low score of 2/5.

== Track listing ==
No.	Title	Writer(s)	Length
1.	"Music"	Darude	3:30
2.	"Next to You"	Darude	3:56
3.	"Bitter Sweet"	Darude	6:06
4.	"Serendipity"	Darude	6:09
5.	"Healing"	Darude	6:56
6.	"Rush"	Darude	6:14
7.	"Drive"	Darude	5:06
8.	"Passing By"	Darude	5:50
9.	"Obsession"	Darude	6:25
10.	"Ranta"	Darude	5:17
11.	"Music (Original Mix)"	Darude	7:17
12.	"Next to You (Vocal Mix)"	Darude	7:39

== Charts ==
Chart (2003)	Peak position
Finnish Albums (Suomen virallinen lista)	4
US Dance/Electronic Albums (Billboard)	11
