= Look Away (Darude song) =

2019 single by Darude and Sebastian Rejman

Single by Darude feat. Sebastian Rejman
- Language: English
- Released: 22 February 2019
- Length: 3:00
- Label: Armada Music
- Composers: Sebastian Rejman; Ville Virtanen

Darude singles chronology
"Superman" (2019)	"Look Away" (2019)	"Hide" (2019)

Music video
- "Look Away" on YouTube

Eurovision Song Contest 2019 entry
- Country: Finland

Finals performance
- Semi-final result: 17th
- Semi-final points: 23
- Final result: {{{place}}}

Entry chronology
- ◄ "Monsters" (2018)
- "Looking Back" (2020) ►

Official performance video
- "Look Away" (First Semi-Final) on YouTube

"Look Away" is a 2019 single by Darude and Sebastian Rejman. The song represented Finland in the Eurovision Song Contest 2019 in Tel Aviv, Israel after winning Uuden Musiikin Kilpailu 2019, Finland's national final for the Eurovision Song Contest. The song did not progress to the final, only earning 23 points in the first semi-final.

== Background ==
The song, according to Sebastian Rejman, was meant to describe the disbelief about how many in the West "look away" at the millions of people in the world living in harsh conditions and poverty. The song was inspired during a trip to New Delhi while Rejman was suffering the flu. While stuck in his hotel room, he was shocked at the conditions outside of the hotel. He reported that it "looked like a sky fight movie after [a] nuclear war." He then later reported that "it was quite a shock to me as a western person to go in Delhi in the city at night when people were sleeping on the streets and living on the streets."

== Eurovision Song Contest ==
=== Uuden Musiikin Kilpailu 2019 ===
Yle announced that they had internally selected DJ Darude and singer Sebastian Rejman to represent Finland in Tel Aviv during a live streamed press conference on 29 January 2019, hosted by 2013 Finnish Eurovision entrant Krista Siegfrids, Mikko Silvennoinen and Christoffer Strandberg. It was also announced during the press conference that the song would be selected through Uuden Musiikin Kilpailu 2019 with three songs competing. The three competing songs along with their promotional music videos were presented on 8, 15 and 22 February 2019, respectively, while the final took place on 2 March 2019 at the Logomo in Turku. All three competing songs were performed by Darude and Sebastian Rejman and "Look Away" was selected as the winning song by a 50/50 combination of public votes and eight international jury groups from the United Kingdom, Norway, Spain, Czech Republic, Sweden, Ireland, Denmark and Israel. The viewers and the juries each had a total of 240 points to award. Each jury group distributed their points as follows: 8, 10 and 12 points. The viewer vote was based on the percentage of votes each song achieved through the following voting methods: telephone, SMS and online voting. For example, if a song gained 10% of the viewer vote, then that entry would be awarded 10% of 240 points rounded to the nearest integer: 24 points.

"Look Away" would dominate both the jury and the televote, winning by a wide margin with a total of 244 points.

=== At Eurovision ===
On 28 January 2019, a special allocation draw was held which placed each country into one of the two semi-finals, as well as which half of the show they would perform in. Finland was placed into the first semi-final, to be held on 14 May 2019, and was scheduled to perform in the first half of the show. Once all the competing songs for the 2019 contest had been released, the running order for the semi-finals was decided by the show's producers rather than through another draw, so that similar songs were not placed next to each other. Finland performed in position 3. It did not qualify for the final.

== Track listing ==
Digital download
No.	Title	Length
1.	"Look Away" (featuring Sebastian Rejman)	2:59
