= Before the Storm (Darude album) =

Studio album by Darude
- Released: 18 September 2000
- Recorded: 1998–2000
- Length: 61:35
- Labels: 16 Inch; BMG
- Producers: Ville Virtanen; Jaakko Salovaara

Darude chronology
Before the Storm (2000)	Rush (2003)

Singles from Before the Storm
- 1. "Sandstorm" Released: 26 October 1999; 2. "Feel the Beat" Released: 20 November 2000; 3. "Out of Control (Back for More)" Released: 1 February 2001

Alternate cover
- Digital download cover

Before the Storm is the debut studio album by Finnish DJ and record producer Darude. It was released on 18 September 2000 by 16 Inch Records. The album sold 800,000 copies worldwide. It also peaked number one on the Finland's Official List for albums.

== Production and singles ==
Before the Storm was produced by JS16 (Jaakko Salovaara), and features two of JS16's remixes. The album includes several singles, the first of which, "Sandstorm", had been released prior to the album in 1999 to great success. Darude's second single, "Feel the Beat", followed the success of "Sandstorm", reaching number one on the singles charts in Finland for 2 weeks and number 5 on the UK Singles Chart. Shortly after the album's release, Darude created a vocal edit of "Out of Control", and released it as a single; "Out of Control (Back for More)". This single also charted in major countries and was re-released on several editions of the album.

== Release and reception ==
Professional ratings
Review scores
Source	Rating
AllMusic	2/5 stars

The album sold 800,000 copies worldwide and earned Darude three Finnish Grammy Awards. It also peaked on a number of charts, including number one on the Finland's Official List for albums, number 6 on the Billboard Dance/Electronic Albums chart and number 11 on the US Independent Albums chart. It also charted high on album charts in a number of other countries, including number 9 in Sweden, number 14 in Norway, number 18 in Canada, number 36 in Australia, and number 34 in France.

Contrary to its chart success, Before the Storm received mixed reviews from critics. AllMusic reviewer Antti J. Ravelin praised the album's singles, but criticised its "monotonality", claiming "Before the Storm may work well on the dancefloor, but it is virtually impossible to listen to the whole album at home".

== Track listing ==
=== Original release ===
No.	Title	Writer(s)	Producer(s)	Length
1.	"Sandstorm"	Ville Virtanen	Ville Virtanen; Jaakko Salovaara	3:45
2.	"Burning"	Jaakko Salovaara; Marko Humpula; Mikko Kivari	Virtanen; Salovaara	7:10
3.	"Feel the Beat"	Salovaara	Virtanen; Salovaara	4:18
4.	"Out of Control"	Salovaara	Virtanen; Salovaara	5:02
5.	"Touch Me Feel Me"	Salovaara	Virtanen; Salovaara	6:14
6.	"Calm Before the Storm"	Virtanen; Salovaara	Virtanen; Salovaara	4:53
7.	"Let the Music Take Control"	Virtanen; Salovaara	Virtanen; Salovaara	5:45
8.	"Drums of New York"	Salovaara	Virtanen; Salovaara	6:04
9.	"The Flow"	Virtanen; Toni Lahde	Virtanen; Salovaara	3:52
10.	"Sandstorm" (JS16 Remix)	Virtanen	Virtanen; Salovaara	7:22
11.	"Feel the Beat" (JS16 Dark Mix)	Salovaara	Virtanen; Salovaara	7:06
Total length:				61:35

iTunes bonus tracks
No.	Title	Length
11.	"Sandstorm" (Superchumbo Sandy Storm Remix)	4:16
12.	"Sandstorm" (Darude vs. Orgy Astro American Remix)	4:36
13.	"Feel the Beat" (JS16 Dark Mix)	7:05
14.	"Out of Control (Back for More)"	3:35
15.	"Out of Control" (Spectro Mix)	4:19
Total length:		78:21

=== Special edition ===
In 2001, 16 Inch Records re-released Before the Storm as a two-disc "Special edition".

Disc one
No.	Title	Length
1.	"Out of Control (Back for More)"	3:37
2.	"Burning"	7:10
3.	"Feel the Beat"	4:18
4.	"Sandstorm"	3:45
5.	"Touch Me Feel Me"	6:14
6.	"Calm Before the Storm"	4:53
7.	"Let the Music Take Control"	5:45
8.	"Drums of New York"	6:04
9.	"The Flow"	3:52
10.	"Out of Control (Back for More)" (JS16 remix)	7:05

Disc two
No.	Title	Length
1.	"Sandstorm" (Terpsichord remix)	7:02
2.	"Sandstorm" (JS16 remix)	7:21
3.	"Sandstorm" (Ariel remix)	6:41
4.	"Feel the Beat" (JS16 Dark mix)	7:06
5.	"Feel the Beat" (Rocco & Heist remix)	9:02
6.	"Feel the Beat" (Missing Link remix)	4:55
7.	"Feel the Beat" (Soundfreak remix)	5:38
8.	"Out of Control (Back for More)" (Spectro remix)	6:54
9.	"Out of Control" (Bostik remix)	8:41
10.	"Calm Before the Storm" ('99 remix)	6:32

== Personnel ==
Adapted from CD liner notes.

- Ville Virtanen (Darude) – writing, production, arrangement
- Jaakko Salovaara (JS16) – writing, production, arrangement, remix, additional production, mixing
- Marko Humpula – writing (track 2)
- Mikko Kivari – writing (track 2)
- Toni Lahde – writing (track 9)
- Pauli Saastamoinen – mastering
- Sampo Hanninen – artwork, cover design

== Charts ==
=== Weekly charts ===
Weekly chart performance for Before the Storm
Chart (2000–2001)	Peak position
Australian Albums (ARIA)	36
Canadian Albums (Billboard)	18
Danish Albums (Hitlisten)	28
Dutch Albums (Album Top 100)	74
Finnish Albums (Suomen virallinen lista)	1
French Albums (SNEP)	34
Norwegian Albums (VG-lista)	14
Swedish Albums (Sverigetopplistan)	9
US Top Dance Albums (Billboard)	6
US Independent Albums (Billboard)	11

=== Year-end charts ===
Year-end chart performance for Before the Storm
Chart (2001)	Position
Canadian Albums (Nielsen SoundScan)	128

== Certifications ==
Certifications for Before the Storm
Region	Certification	Certified units/sales
Finland (Musiikkituottajat)	Platinum	78,000

== See also ==
- 2000 in music
- List of number-one albums (Finland)
- List of best-selling albums in Finland
