= Groove Cruise =

Electronic music festival

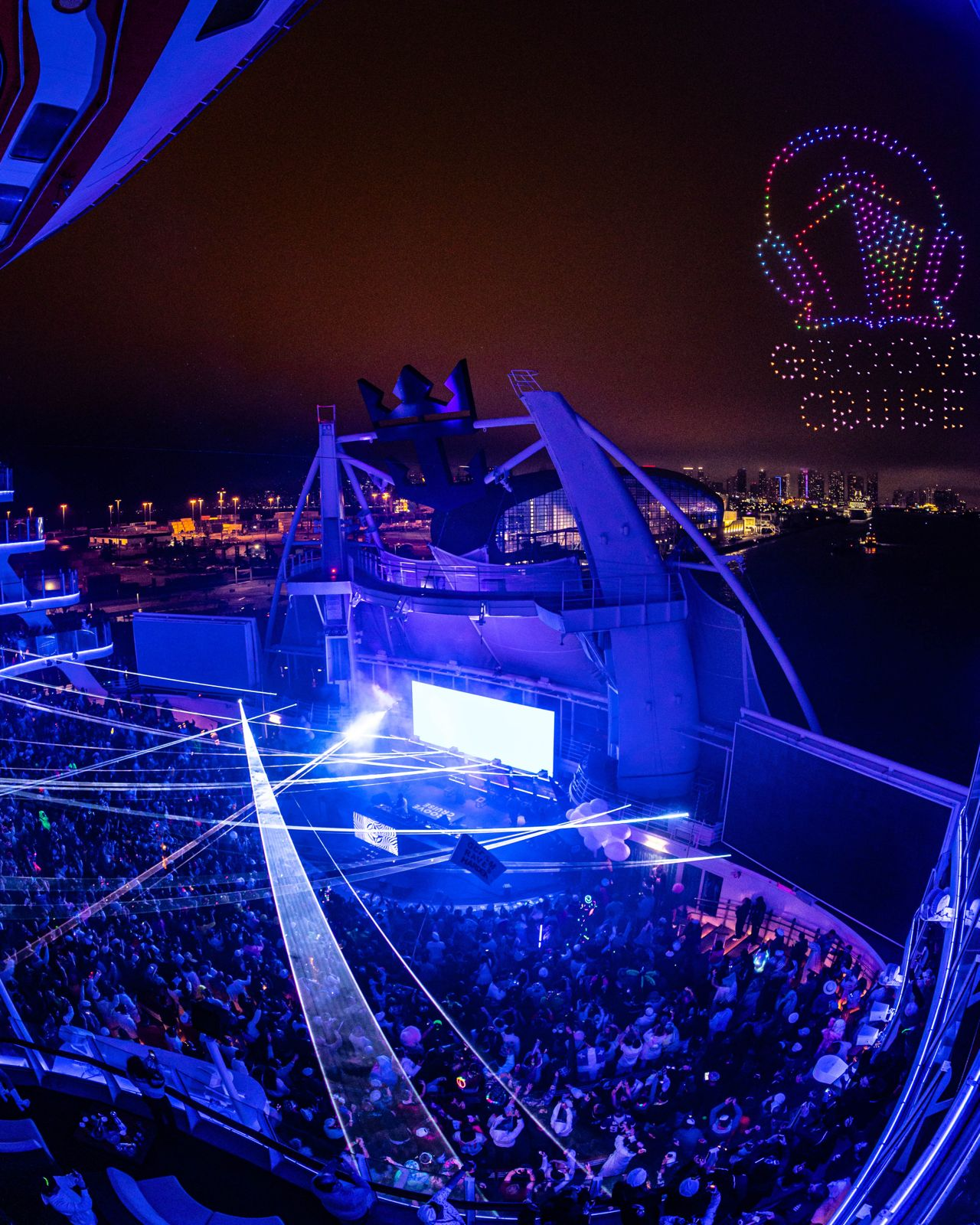
- Drone show during sail away party on Groove Cruise Miami 2025
- Genre: EDM, house music, techno, trance music, melodic dubstep, drum & bass
- Locations: Miami, Los Angeles, Orlando, San Diego, New York
- Years active: 2004 - present
- Founder: Jason Beukema
- Next event: Groove Cruise Miami - January 21 - 25, 2027
- Website: http://groovecruise.com

Groove Cruise is an Electronic dance music cruise festival that sets sail from various U.S. ports, offering an experience that combines, music, dance, travel and philanthropy. It was founded in 2004 and is known for its performances by well known DJs and producers within the EDM community. It is the world's longest running dance music cruise and as of 2026, it is the world's largest music cruise based on attendance.

== History ==
Groove Cruise was founded in 2004 by Jason Beukema. The event initially started as a small gathering of 125 electronic music enthusiasts; but by 2011, the event had grown large enough to charter an entire cruise ship, making Jason the youngest person to single-handedly do so. Since then, Groove Cruise has chartered over 20 cruise ships.

Whet Travel, the parent company of Groove Cruise, has received Partner of the Year Awards from both Norwegian and Carnival Cruise Lines, been in the Inc 5000 list three times and been featured in media such as USA Today, The New York Times, Travel Channel, MTV, NBC, Wall Street Journal, Rolling Stone, Billboard, Mixmag, and Forbes. In 2026, Whet Travel remains the largest independent music cruise company.

Groove Cruise was ranked among the world's Top 100 Festivals by DJ Mag in 2023, 2024, and 2025.

Over the years, Groove Cruise has hosted events out of ports in Miami, Orlando, Florida, Los Angeles, and San Diego. The destinations have included The Bahamas, Haiti, Mexico, Key West and Santa Catalina Island (California), and the cruise has featured performances by Kaskade, Tiësto, Eric Prydz, Green Velvet, Deadmau5, Oliver Heldens and John Summit.

== Concept and format ==
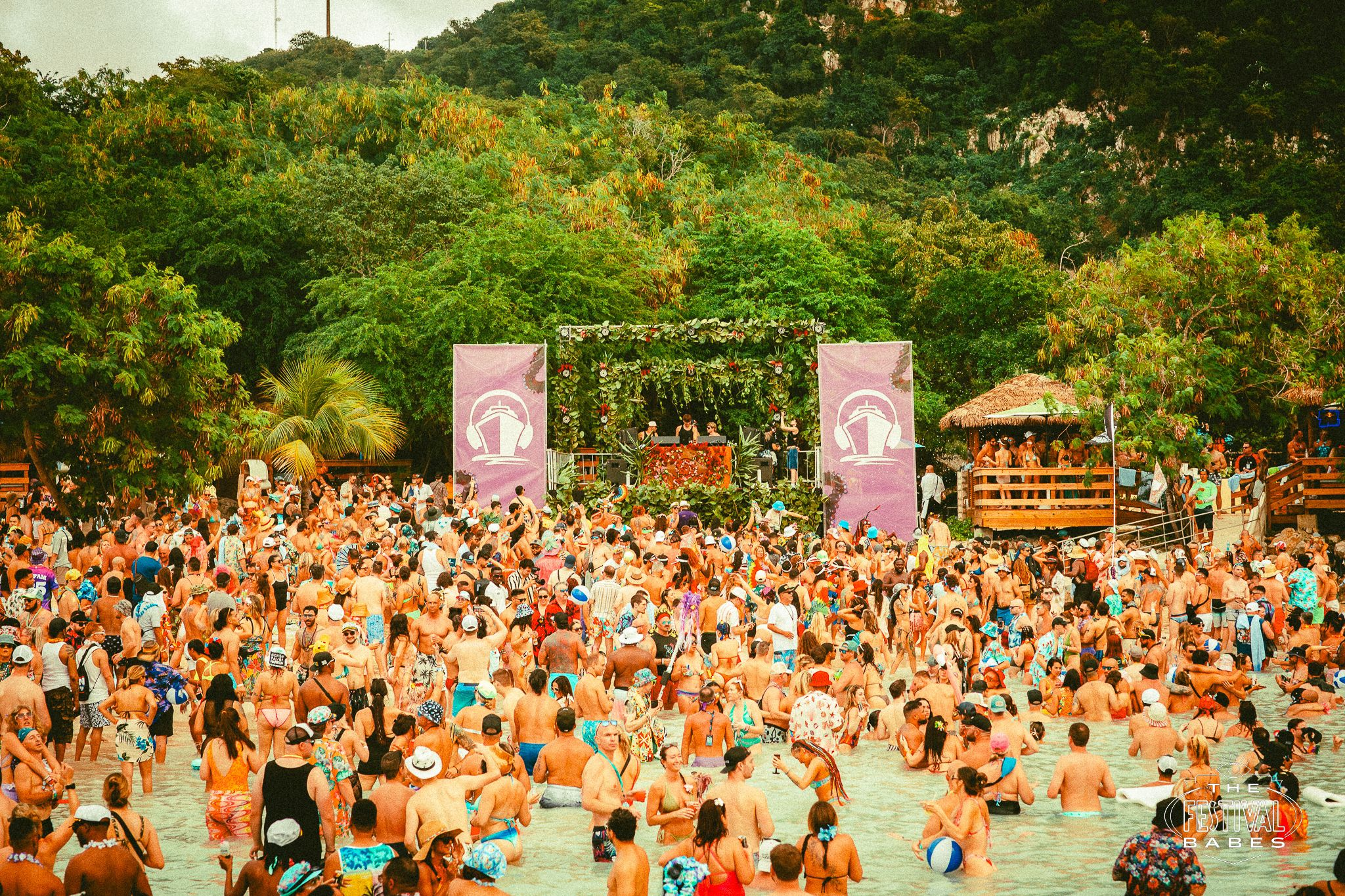
Beach party in Labadee during Groove Cruise Miami 2025

Each Groove Cruise event features an extensive lineup of DJs, live performances, daily themed parties, and curated activities for attendees. The festival offers a multi-day experience aboard cruise ships, where passengers have access to events, beach parties, and private island stops.

Groove Cruise offers 24 hour music and performance programming during the duration of the entire cruise, across 10 or more stages in various locations on the ship. The event mainly features dance music, but has also included a variety of other genres such as emo music, country music, and throwback hip-hop. Pop music was introduced on the 2025 sailing in the form of a Taylor Swift tribute party.

Attendees also have the opportunity to interact with the DJs on board through artist-hosted activities. Past activities have included dinners, blackjack tournaments, scavenger hunts, pickleball, wine tasting, hot wing eating contests, jet ski tours, roller coaster rides, ziplining, and kayaking. The proceeds of paid artist activities benefit Whet Foundation, Whet Travel's 501c3 that offers programs and initiatives to children in South Florida, the Caribbean, and Mexico.

Additional cruise activities include:

- Celebration of Life, a ceremony to honor loved ones who have died, in which participants have the opportunity to share their stories.
- Volunteer opportunities at the cruise destinations in partnership with Whet Foundation as part of the Destination Donation Initiative, such as reconstructing schools and churches, engaging in music and arts activities with local children, and delivering supplies. All festival attendees are encouraged to pack essential items to be donated to underprivileged children. Financial donations are encouraged as well.
- Mental health talks and workshops.
- Music industry panels and demo listening sessions.

== Venues and locations ==
The event typically departs from major U.S. cities like Miami, and Los Angeles and travels to destinations such as the Caribbean islands, The Bahamas, and Mexico.

=== List of events ===
Event	Dates	Cruise Ship	Destination
Groove Cruise 2004	November 7–14, 2004	Royal Caribbean Explorer of the Seas	Belize, Cozumel, Mexico and Cayman Islands
Groove Cruise 2005	May 20–23, 2005	Royal Caribbean Monarch of the Seas	Catalina Island, California and Ensenada, Mexico
Groove Cruise Armada 2006	May 2006	Royal Caribbean Freedom of the Seas	Coco Cay and Nassau, Bahamas
Groove Cruise Los Angeles 2006	July 21–24, 2006	Royal Caribbean Monarch of the Seas	Ensenada, Mexico
Groove Cruise Miami 2006	November 12–19, 2006	Royal Caribbean Monarch of the Seas	Cozumel, Grand Cayman, Montego Bay, and Labadee
Groove Cruise Miami 2007	May 11–14, 2007	Royal Caribbean Majesty of the Seas	Coco Cay and Nassau, Bahamas
Groove Cruise Los Angeles 2007	July 20–23, 2007	Royal Caribbean Monarch of the Seas	Ensenada, Mexico
Groove Cruise Miami 2008	January 21–24, 2008	Royal Caribbean Majesty of the Seas	Coco Cay and Nassau, Bahamas
Groove Cruise Los Angeles 2008	July 25–28, 2008	Royal Caribbean Monarch of the Seas	Ensenada, Mexico
Groove Cruise Miami 2009	January 23–26, 2009	Royal Caribbean Majesty of the Seas	Nassau and Coco Cay, Bahamas
Groove Cruise San Diego 2009	October 1–5, 2009	Carnival Elation	Cabo San Lucas, Mexico
Groove Cruise Miami 2010	January 29-February 1, 2010	Norwegian Sky	Great Stirrup Cay and Nassau, Bahamas
Groove Cruise New York City 2010	August 4–9, 2010	Carnival Glory	St. John's, Newfoundland and Labrador
Groove Cruise Miami 2011	January 21–24, 2011	Norwegian Sky	Great Stirrup Cay and Nassau, Bahamas
Groove Cruise Miami 2012	January 27–30, 2012	Norwegian Sky	Great Stirrup Cay and Nassau, Bahamas
Groove Cruise Miami 2013	January 25–28, 2013	Norwegian Sky	The Bahamas
Groove Cruise Los Angeles 2013	September 27–30, 2013	Carnival Inspiration	Mexico
Groove Cruise Miami 2014	January 30-February 3, 2014	Norwegian Pearl	Cozumel, Mexico
Groove Cruise Los Angeles 2014	October 2–5, 2014	Princess Cruises Golden Princess	Catalina Island, California and Mexico
Groove Cruise Miami 2015	January 28-February 1, 2015	Norwegian Pearl	The Bahamas
Groove Cruise Los Angeles 2015	October 2–5, 2015	Carnival Inspiration	Catalina Island, California and Ensenada, Mexico
Groove Cruise Miami 2016	January 22–26, 2016	Norwegian Pearl	Jamaica
Groove Cruise Cabo 2016	October 28-November 2, 2016	Norwegian Sun	Cabo San Lucas, Mexico
Groove Cruise Miami 2017	January 23–27, 2017	Carnival Victory	Caribbean, Grand Turk Island
Groove Cruise Los Angeles 2017	October 6–9, 2017	Carnival Inspiration	Ensenada, Mexico
Groove Cruise Miami 2018	January 26–29, 2018	Royal Caribbean Enchantment of the Seas	Coco Cay and Nassau, Bahamas
Groove Cruise Cabo 2018	October 10–14, 2018	Norwegian Pearl	Cabo San Lucas, Mexico
Groove Cruise Miami 2019	January 10–14, 2019	Celebrity Infinity	Key West and Cozumel, Mexico
Groove Island 2019	September 29–30, 2019	N/A	Catalina Island, California
Groove Cruise Miami 2020	January 9–13, 2020	Celebrity Infinity	Costa Maya, Mexico
Groove Cruise Los Angeles 2020 (Cancelled due to the COVID-19 pandemic)	October 2020	Norwegian Bliss	Mexico
Groove Cruise Miami 2021 (Cancelled due to the COVID-19 pandemic)	January 7–11, 2021	Celebrity Infinity	Costa Maya, Mexico
Groove Cruise Orlando 2022	January 20–24, 2022	Royal Caribbean Mariner of the Seas	Free Port, The Bahamas
Groove Cruise Cabo 2022	October 19–24, 2022	Norwegian Jewel	Cabo San Lucas, Mexico
Groove Cruise Miami 2023	January 19–23, 2023	Celebrity Summit	Labadee, Haiti
Groove Cruise Miami 2024	January 24–28, 2024	Norwegian Encore	Great Stirrup Cay, Bahamas
Groove Cruise Miami 2025	January 23–27, 2025	Royal Caribbean Allure Of The Seas	Labadee, Haiti
Groove Cruise Miami 2026	January 22–26, 2026	Royal Caribbean Wonder Of The Seas	Nassau, Bahamas
Groove Cruise Miami 2027	January 21–25, 2027	Royal Caribbean Allure of The Seas	Paradise Island, Bahamas

== Artists and lineups ==
Groove Cruise has hosted EDM artists such as Kaskade, Tiësto, Eric Prydz, Green Velvet, Claude Von Stroke, Markus Schulz, Seven Lions, James Hype, Deadmau5, Oliver Heldens and John Summit. The festival's lineup includes over 100 artists on each cruise and encompasses multiple sub-genres of EDM, including house music, techno, trance music, melodic dubstep and drum & bass.

Groove Cruise also provides aspiring artists the opportunity to play on board by competing in a DJ contest. Cruising For Kindness, which also includes a charity component that raised over $23,000 for the Whet Foundation Hurricane Relief Fund in 2024.

The cruise is notable for its efforts to support diverse talent representation, with over 40 female artists on the lineup for the 2026 sailing.

== Reception and impact ==
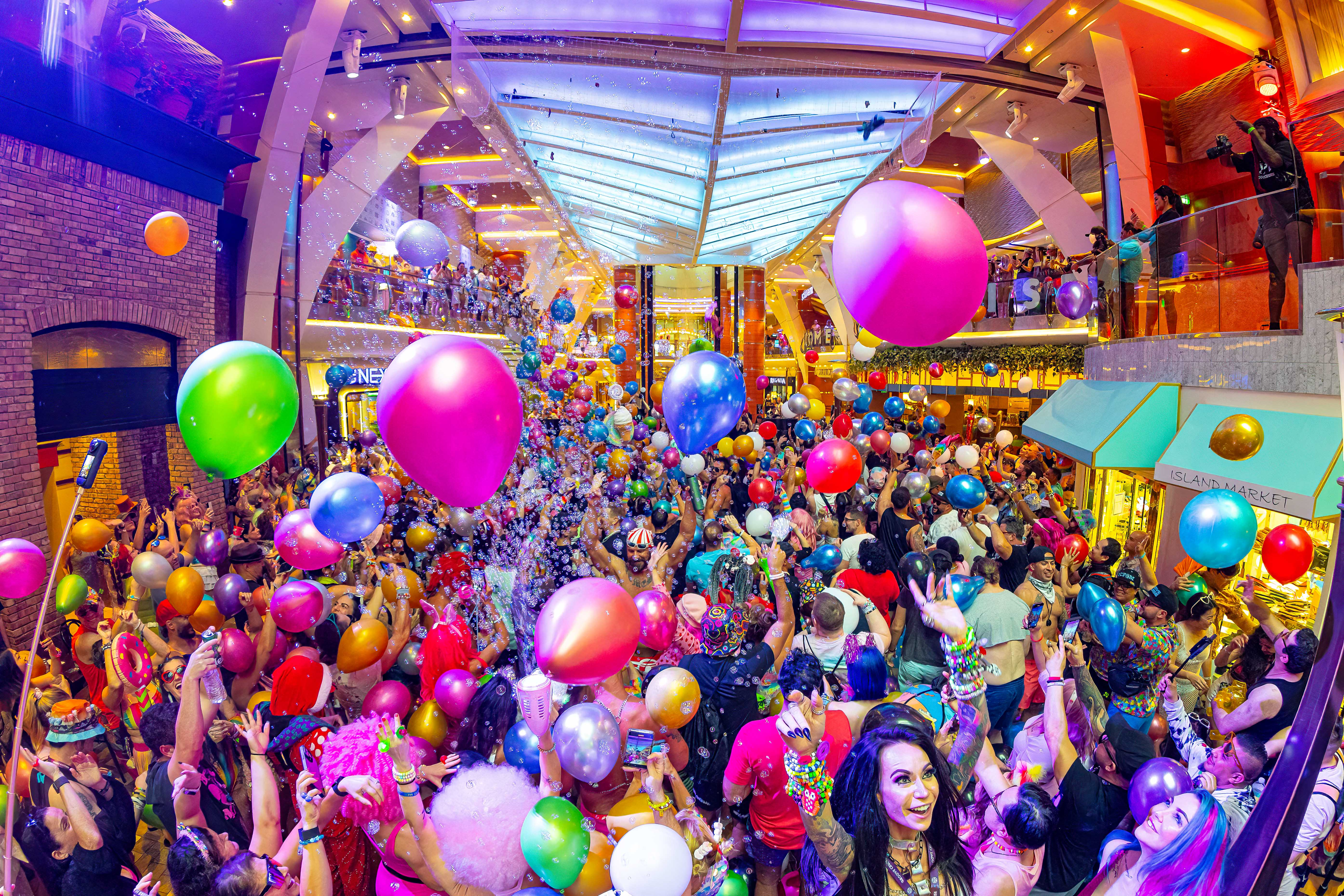
Balloon drop during Groove Cruise Miami 2025

Groove Cruise has received acclaim for its immersive music festival experience, with fans praising the atmosphere and DJ performances. According to Billboard, the event has significantly contributed to the growing popularity of EDM festivals and the crossover between music and travel.

In 2020, the Whet Foundation raised over $50,000 for the COVID-19 Relief Fund through the Groove Cruise Virtual Sail Always live streams on Twitch and Groove Cruise has raised over $104,000 for various charities and initiatives since 2020.

Groove Cruise has been sponsored by brands such as Red Bull, Bacardi, Pernod Ricard, Jameson, and Molson Coors.

== Future and developments ==
Groove Cruise Miami 2027 set sail to Nassau, Bahamas from January 21–25, 2027 aboard Royal Caribbean Allure Of The Seas.

In upcoming years, Groove Cruise plans to expand its offerings by exploring new cruise routes and incorporating more international destinations to provide a global EDM experience.

== See also ==
- List of electronic music festivals
- Rave
