= Feel the Beat (Darude song) =

2000 single by Darude

Single by Darude

from the album Before the Storm
- B-side: "Remix"
- Released: 20 November 2000
- Genre: Trance
- Length: 8:36 (original mix); 4:18 (radio edit)
- Label: 16 Inch (FIN); Neo (UK); Robbins (US)
- Songwriters: Jaakko Salovaara; Ville Virtanen
- Producers: Jaakko Salovaara, Darude

Darude singles chronology
"Sandstorm" (1999)	"Feel the Beat" (2000)	"Out of Control (Back for More)" (2001)

Music video
- "Feel the Beat" on YouTube

"Feel the Beat" is a song by Finnish DJ and record producer Darude. It was released as the second single from his debut studio album Before the Storm. It shares many similar musical elements to the first single, "Sandstorm", and achieved success throughout Europe, Oceania, and North America. It topped the singles charts in Finland and was a top ten hit in the UK, Ireland, Canada, and on the US (Billboard Hot Dance Club Play).

== Music video ==
A music video was filmed for "Feel the Beat". In the video, Darude appears holding a briefcase and riding a Razor scooter. He gets into a Dodge Viper with a young woman and drives through the countryside, eventually stopping to meet a helicopter. The helicopter flies them to a dance party. Darude opens the briefcase to reveal a golden LP labeled "DARUDE – FEEL THE BEAT", which he proceeds to play on a turntable.

== Track listings ==
These are the formats and track listings of major single releases of "Feel the Beat".

CD maxi – Europe

1. "Feel the Beat" (Radio Version) — 4:18
2. "Feel the Beat" (Original Version) — 8:36
3. "Feel the Beat" (JS16 Dark Mix) — 7:06
4. "Feel the Beat" (Soundfreak Remix) — 5:35
5. "Feel the Beat" (Missing Link Remix) — 4:54

CD maxi – Asia

1. "Feel the Beat" (Radio Edit) — 3:18
2. "Feel the Beat" (Original Mix) — 8:36
3. "Feel the Beat" (JS16 Dark Remix) — 7:19
4. "Feel the Beat" (Rocco & Heist Remix 1) — 7:19
5. "Feel the Beat" (Rocco & Heist Remix 2) — 8:50

12" maxi – Europe

1. "Feel the Beat" (original mix) — 8:36
2. "Feel the Beat" (JS16 dark mix) — 7:06

12" maxi – UK

1. "Feel the Beat" (Original Mix) — 8:36
2. "Feel the Beat" (JS16 Dark Mix) — 7:06
3. "Feel the Beat" (Rocco & Heist Remix 1) — 7:19

12" maxi – America

1. "Feel the Beat" (Original Club Mix) — 8:36
2. "Feel the Beat" (Missing Link Remix) — 4:54
3. "Feel the Beat" (JS16 Dark Mix) — 7:06
4. "Feel the Beat" (Soundfreak Remix) — 5:35

CD single

1. "Feel the Beat" (Edit) — 4:18
2. "Feel the Beat" (Original Mix) — 8:36
3. "Feel the Beat" (JS16 Dark Mix) — 7:06

Cassette

1. "Feel the Beat" (Radio Edit) — 4:18
2. "Feel the Beat" (Radio Edit) — 4:18

== Charts ==
=== Weekly charts ===
Chart (2000–2001)	Peak position
Australia (ARIA)	20
Australian Dance (ARIA)	5
Austria (Ö3 Austria Top 40)	24
Belgium (Ultratop 50 Flanders)	12
Belgium (Ultratop 50 Wallonia)	42
Canada (Nielsen SoundScan)	7
Finland (Suomen virallinen lista)	1
France (SNEP)	25
Germany (Media Control Charts)	18
Greece (IFPI)	8
Ireland (IRMA)	10
Ireland Dance (IRMA)	1
Netherlands (Mega Top 100)	19
New Zealand (RIANZ)	26
Norway (VG-lista)	18
Scotland Singles (OCC)	3
Sweden (Sverigetopplistan)	18
Switzerland (Schweizer Hitparade)	34
UK Singles (Official Charts Company)	5
UK Dance (OCC)	2
UK Indie (OCC)	1
US Billboard Hot Dance Club Play	5

=== Year-end charts ===
Chart (2000)	Position
UK Singles (OCC)	125

Chart (2001)	Position
Canada (Nielsen SoundScan)	48

== Certification ==
Region	Certification	Certified units/sales
Australia (ARIA)	Gold	35,000^{^}
^{^} Shipments figures based on certification alone.

== See also ==
- List of number-one singles (Finland)
