= Next to You (Darude song) =

Single by Darude featuring Elena Mady

from the album Rush
- Released: April 11, 2003
- Recorded: 2003
- Genre: Trance
- Length: 3:55 (radio edit)
- Label: 16 Inch Records; RCA Records; BMG Finland
- Songwriter(s): Ville Virtanen
- Producer(s): Heikki Liimatainen

Darude singles chronology
"Music" (2003)	"Next to You" (2003)	"Tell Me" (2007)

Music video
- "Next to You" on YouTube

"Next to You" is a song by the Finnish DJ Darude, featuring Elena Mady on vocals. It was released on 11 April 2003 as the second and final single from his second studio album, Rush (2003). The song was his third number-one single on Suomen virallinen lista.

== Commercial performance ==
"Next To You" debuted at number one on the Finnish singles chart, but it only stayed four weeks in the chart. It also failed to reach other charts.

== Track listing ==
Finnish release only

=== CD ===
All tracks are written by Ville Virtanen.

No.	Title	Length
1.	"RMX Radio Edit"	3:55
2.	"RMX"	8:19
3.	"Original"	7:35
4.	"RMX Dub"	8:20

== Charts ==
=== Weekly charts ===
Chart (2003)	Peak position
Finland (Suomen virallinen lista)	1

== See also ==
- List of number-one singles (Finland)
