= Electronic Dream =

2011 album by AraabMuzik

Studio album by AraabMuzik
- Released: June 14, 2011
- Genre: Hip hop; electronica; trance
- Length: 36:00 (Standard); 56:22 (Deluxe)
- Label: Duke
- Producer: Abraham Orellana

Alternative cover
- Deluxe Artwork

Electronic Dream is the debut studio album by American producer AraabMuzik, released digitally on June 14, 2011, by Duke Productions LP. The album features AraabMuzik's signature MPC-driven hip-hop beats over heavily sampled popular trance and progressive house tracks from the era.

== Reception ==
Professional ratings
Review scores
Source	Rating
Beats per Minute	84%
Consequence of Sound	3.5/5 stars
Fact	4/5 stars
Pitchfork	8.2/10
Resident Advisor	3.5/5
Rolling Stone	3.5/5 stars

Electronic Dream received positive reviews gaining an average rating of 80 from Metacritic which normalizes critic scores out of 100. Pitchfork's Tom Breihan gave the album 8.2/10, earning it a "Best New Music" accolade, writing, "There's something truly fascinating about the entire LP: An up-and-coming hardcore rap producer leaving his genre behind so that he can twist and scramble this hands-in-the-air big-room sound. And in peeling back its excesses and substituting in his own eccentricities, Araab uncovers a primal emotional force in this music, one that fits beautifully with his own air-raid siren aesthetic." Tom Lea of FACT rated the album a 4 out of 5 and, while admitting there is "nothing 'cool'" about Electronic Dream, states that it's "a thousand times more vital and full of life than the majority of the overproduced, diva-for-hire vocal tracks coming out of the UK." The song "Streetz Tonight" came under fire from trance producer Adam K, whose remix of Kaskade's "4AM" was sampled for the song. The track was later removed from the standard edition as well as subsequent deluxe editions of the album.

Pitchfork placed the album at number 40 on its list of the "Top 50 albums of 2011".

== Track listing ==
All music is composed by AraabMuzik.

Standard Edition
No.	Title	Length
1.	"Electronic Dream"	2:32
2.	"Streetz Tonight" (originally released but now absent from streaming services)	3:34
3.	"Golden Touch"	3:48
4.	"Free Spirit"	3:01
5.	"Underground Stream"	3:15
6.	"Make It Happen"	2:05
7.	"Lift Off"	2:44
8.	"AT2"	4:52
9.	"Let It Go"	3:09
10.	"Feelin' So Hood"	3:41
11.	"Lost in a Maze"	3:13
Total length:		36:00

Deluxe Edition
No.	Title	Length
1.	"Electronic Dream"	2:32
2.	"Golden Touch"	3:48
3.	"Free Spirit"	3:01
4.	"Underground Stream"	3:15
5.	"Make It Happen"	2:05
6.	"Lift Off"	2:44
7.	"AT2"	4:52
8.	"Let It Go"	3:09
9.	"Feeling So High"	3:41
10.	"Lost in a Maze"	3:13
11.	"I Remember" (announced and released but later removed, no longer appears on most editions)	4:07
12.	"I'm Waitin' for You"	4:07
13.	"I Live My Life"	4:25
14.	"Outer Space"	3:47
15.	"Silent World"	4:17
16.	"Not Afraid to Die"	3:12
17.	"DoomsDay" (eMusic exclusive)	2:55
Total length:		59:19*

== Samples ==
- "Electronic Dream" samples "Satellite" by OceanLab
- "Streetz Tonight" samples "4 AM (Adam K & Soha Remix)" by Kaskade
- "Golden Touch" samples "Right in the Night" by Jam & Spoon and "Follow Your Heart" by Favretto ft. Naan
- "Free Spirit" samples "Why Don't You Dance With Me" by Future Breeze
- "Underground Stream" samples "Underground Stream" by DJ Nosferatu
- "Make It Happen" samples "Your Eyes" by Dogzilla
- "Lift Off" samples "Castles in the Sky (Peter Luts remix)" by Ian van Dahl
- "AT2" samples "Heart (Temple One presents Tu Casa remix)" by Espen Lorentzen feat. Simon Latham
- "Let It Go" samples "All the Way" by Ronski Speed
- "Feeling So High" samples "So High (Martin Roth remix)" by Starchaser feat. Lo-Fi Sugar
- "Lost in a Maze" samples "5 Million Miles" by Hiver & Hammer ft. Javah
- "I Remember" samples "I Remember" by Deadmau5 & Kaskade
- "I Live My Life" samples "All of My Life (Airpanel Remix)" by Aluna
- "Outer Space" samples "The Greater Good (Marcus Schössow remix)" by Judge Jules
- "Silent World" samples "We Are in Words" by Moonbeam feat. Avis Vox
- "Not Afraid to Die" samples "Everything to Lose (Armin van Buuren remix)" by Dido
