= Sandstorm (instrumental) =

1999 single by Darude

Single by Darude

from the album Before the Storm
- Released: 26 October 1999
- Recorded: September–October 1999
- Studio: JS16 (Finland)
- Genre: Eurodance; trance
- Length: 7:26 (original mix); 3:45 (radio edit)
- Label: 16 Inch
- Songwriter: Ville Virtanen
- Producers: JS16; Ville Virtanen

Darude singles chronology
"Sandstorm" (1999)	"Feel the Beat" (2000)

Audio sample
- "Sandstorm": file; help

Music video
- "Sandstorm" on YouTube

"Sandstorm" is an instrumental by Finnish DJ and record producer Darude, released as the lead single from his debut studio album, Before the Storm (2000). It was initially released in Finland on 26 October 1999 by 16 Inch Records and was released worldwide throughout 2000. The track was uploaded to MP3.com, where it gained global recognition. It has also gained recognition for its usage in sports and popularity in internet meme culture. Its music video was directed by Juuso Syrjä, a.k.a. Uzi, and filmed on site in Helsinki.

"Sandstorm" topped the charts of Canada and Norway and was certified platinum in the United States by the Recording Industry Association of America (RIAA) for sales of over one million. On the centenary of Finland's independence in 2017, celebrations in Helsinki included Darude as one of the main performers with his "Sandstorm". In 2025, Billboard magazine ranked "Sandstorm" among "The 100 Best Dance Songs of All Time".

== Background ==
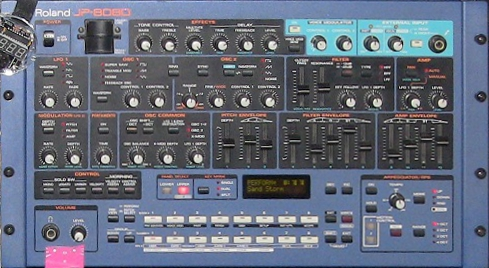
The Roland JP-8080 synthesizer used in "Sandstorm" (pictured); displaying "sand storm" on its screen, from which the title is derived.

Darude first started making happy hardcore with a music tracker program on his computer, playing gigs as "Rudeboy". He then performed with Wille "Weirdness" Heikkilä as "Position 1", making light Eurodance tunes, and he paired with other DJs on other projects. In September and October 1999, as Darude, he began collaborating with Jaakko "JS16" Salovaara, known as the producer of the Bomfunk MC's. "Sandstorm" was the first product of the collaboration, ready after about a week of work. JS16 signed Darude as the first artist on JS16's new label 16 Inch Records.

Darude had been uploading various pieces of his trance experimentation on the website MP3.com, where he was building a following, and he also uploaded the full-length demo of "Sandstorm". This exposure was responsible for worldwide interest in "Sandstorm". In 2000, Darude reported on his mp3.com artist's page that he had "removed the full-length tracks" of "Sandstorm" at the request of his record company.

The title of the instrumental originates from the Roland JP-8080 synthesizer used in the song, which displays the text "sand storm" on startup.

== Composition ==
"Sandstorm" is an instrumental trance composition. According to Darude, the hardware and software used to make the track are as follows: P2, Cubase VST 32, FastTracker 2, ReBirth, Korg TR-Rack. Then with JS16 in his studio: Cubase on Atari 1040ST, Ensoniq ASR-10 sampler, Roland JP8080, NordLead2, Roland JV2080, Ensoniq DP4, Mackie 24/8, Behringer rack compressor.

It was composed with a tempo of 136 beats per minute in the key of E minor.

== Chart performance ==
Soon after its release, "Sandstorm" became popular on pop radio stations, reaching number one in Norway. Its sales worldwide eventually reached two million, and it was featured on 200 compilations.

== Music video ==
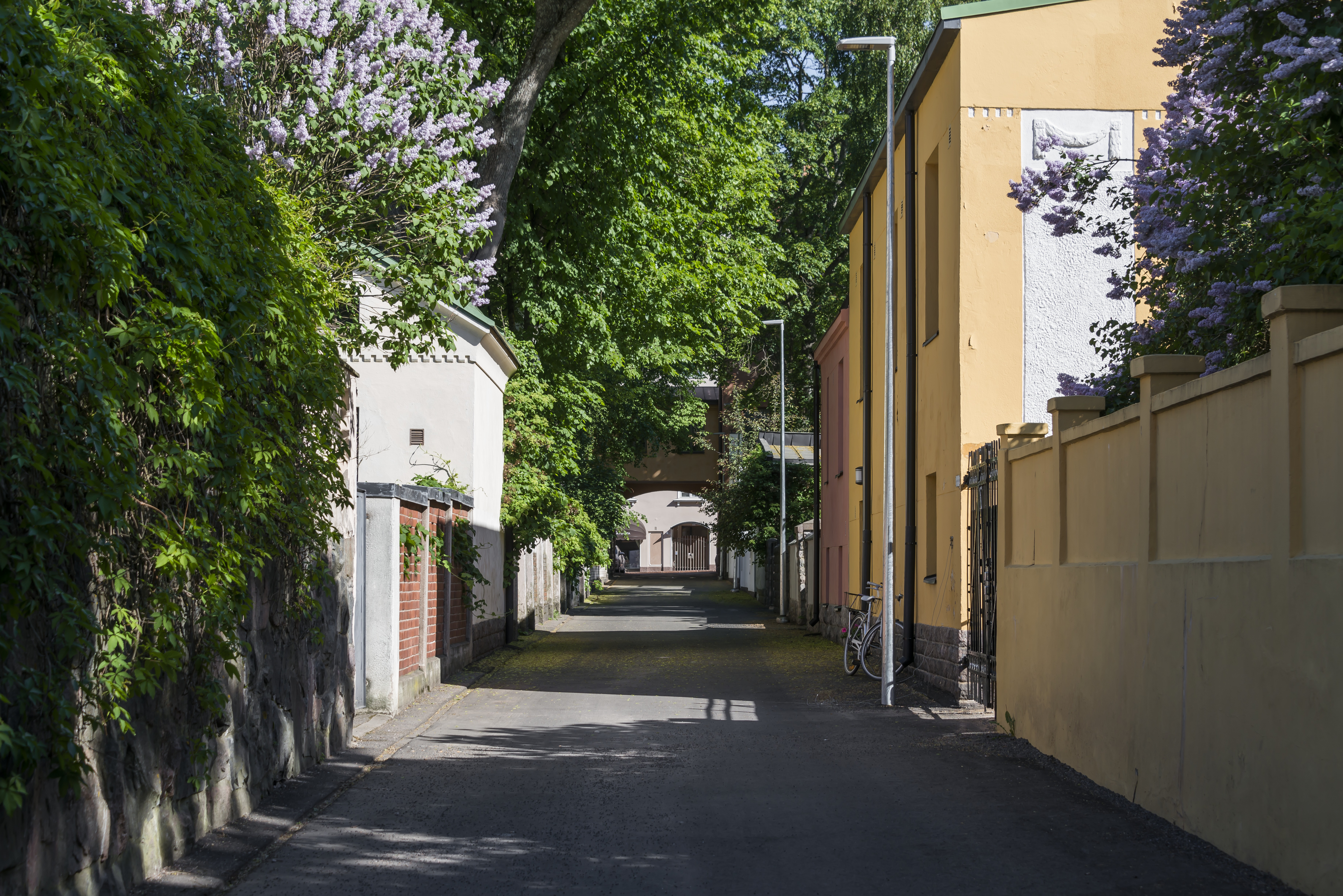
Huvilakuja in Ullanlinna, one of the streets seen in the video

The accompanying music video for "Sandstorm" features Darude with headphones viewing two armed security guards (a man and a woman) chasing a woman with a case. Darude seems to appear sitting calmly at every place where the pursuers and the pursued go. Near the end, the woman with the case stumbles and one of her pursuers (the other woman) betrays her partner, knocking him out. The two women take the case onto a boat with Darude.

The video was directed by Juuso Syrjä, a.k.a. Uzi, and was shot in various places in Helsinki, including the Helsinki Cathedral and the Senate Square. It became the first Finnish music video shown on MTV in the US and it received several awards in Finland and on MTV.

== Legacy ==
In March 2025, Billboard magazine ranked "Sandstorm" number 65 in their list of "The 100 Best Dance Songs of All Time".

== Track listings ==
Finnish CD single
No.	Title	Length
1.	"Sandstorm" (radio edit)	3:45
2.	"Sandstorm" (original mix)	7:21

UK CD and 12-inch single
No.	Title	Length
1.	"Sandstorm" (radio edit)	3:45
2.	"Sandstorm" (original mix)	7:21
3.	"Sandstorm" (JS16 Remix)	7:24

UK cassette single
No.	Title	Length
1.	"Sandstorm" (radio edit)	3:45

US CD single
No.	Title	Length
1.	"Sandstorm" (radio edit)	3:46
2.	"Sandstorm" (original mix)	7:24
3.	"Sandstorm" (JS16 Remix)	7:19
4.	"Sandstorm" (Ariel Remix)	6:43

US 12-inch single
No.	Title	Length
1.	"Sandstorm" (original mix)	7:24
2.	"Sandstorm" (JS16 Remix)	7:19
3.	"Sandstorm" (Ariel Remix)	6:43
4.	"Sandstorm" (Terpsichord Remix)	7:01

Australian CD single
No.	Title	Length
1.	"Sandstorm" (radio edit)	2:55
2.	"Sandstorm" (original mix)	7:24
3.	"Sandstorm" (JS16 Remix)	7:21

Sandstorm (The Remixes) – EP
No.	Title	Length
1.	"Sandstorm" (radio edit)	3:49
2.	"Sandstorm" (extended)	7:26
3.	"Sandstorm" (Dallas Superstars Remix)	8:24
4.	"Sandstorm" (Komytea radio remix)	3:54
5.	"Sandstorm" (Komytea Remix)	7:40
6.	"Sandstorm" (DJ Ray Aka Tom Hafman Remix)	7:13
7.	"Sandstorm" (Superchumbo's Sandy Storm)	8:38
8.	"Sandstorm" (Jan Driver Remix)	6:16

== Charts ==
=== Weekly charts ===
Weekly chart performance for "Sandstorm"
Chart (1999–2001)	Peak position
Australia (ARIA)	40
Austria (Ö3 Austria Top 40)	13
Belgium (Ultratop 50 Flanders)	14
Belgium (Ultratop 50 Wallonia)	36
Canada (Nielsen SoundScan)	1
Denmark (IFPI)	3
Europe (Eurochart Hot 100)	8
Finland (Suomen virallinen lista)	3
France (SNEP)	14
Germany (GfK)	6
Greece (IFPI)	3
Ireland (IRMA)	3
Ireland Dance (IRMA)	1
Italy (FIMI)	49
Netherlands (Dutch Top 40)	14
Netherlands (Single Top 100)	8
New Zealand (Recorded Music NZ) with "Feel the Beat"	26
Norway (VG-lista)	1
Scottish Singles Sales (Official Charts)	2
Spain (Promusicae)	13
Sweden (Sverigetopplistan)	6
Switzerland (Schweizer Hitparade)	8
UK Singles (Official Charts)	3
UK Dance (Official Charts)	1
UK Indie (Official Charts)	1
US Billboard Hot 100	83
US Dance Club Songs (Billboard) The Remixes	5
US Dance Singles Sales (Billboard) The Remixes	11
US Rhythmic Airplay (Billboard)	36
US Top 40 Tracks (Billboard)	38

=== Year-end charts ===
2000 year-end chart performance for "Sandstorm"
Chart (2000)	Position
Belgium (Ultratop 50 Flanders)	69
Europe (Eurochart Hot 100)	29
France (SNEP)	93
Germany (Media Control)	38
Ireland (IRMA)	10
Netherlands (Dutch Top 40)	47
Netherlands (Single Top 100)	48
Romania (Romanian Top 100)	34
Sweden (Hitlistan)	58
Switzerland (Schweizer Hitparade)	52
UK Singles (OCC)	26

2001 year-end chart performance for "Sandstorm"
Chart (2001)	Position
Canada (Nielsen SoundScan)	8
US Maxi-Singles Sales (Billboard)	22

Chart (2002)	Position
Canada (Nielsen SoundScan)	158

== Certifications ==
Certifications and sales for "Sandstorm"
Region	Certification	Certified units/sales
Denmark (IFPI Danmark)	Platinum	90,000^{‡}
Finland (Musiikkituottajat)	Platinum	13,025
Germany (BVMI)	Platinum	600,000^{‡}
New Zealand (RMNZ)	3× Platinum	90,000^{‡}
Spain (Promusicae)	Gold	30,000^{‡}
Sweden (GLF)	Gold	15,000^{^}
United Kingdom (BPI)	3× Platinum	1,800,000^{‡}
United States (RIAA)	Platinum	1,000,000^{‡}
^{^} Shipments figures based on certification alone.^{‡} Sales+streaming figures based on certification alone.

== Release history ==
Release dates and formats for "Sandstorm"
Region	Date	Format(s)	Label(s)	Ref.
Finland	26 October 1999	CD	16 Inch	
Sweden	17 April 2000	CD	16 Inch	
United Kingdom	5 June 2000	12-inch vinyl; CD; cassette	Neo	
Spain	23 June 2000	12-inch vinyl	Insolent	
United States	2000	12-inch vinyl; CD	Groovilicious	

== Usage in media ==
=== In film and television ===
"Sandstorm" appeared on the pilot episode of popular Showtime series Queer as Folk, which first aired on 3 December 2000. "Sandstorm" was also used in the 2001 Finnish film Tango Cabaret (Tango Kabaree). In the third installment of the Johnny English film series, Johnny English Strikes Again, the title character, played by Rowan Atkinson, dances to the beat of "Sandstorm" in a dance-club scene.

In 2025, Tesco Clubcard celebrated its 30th anniversary with an advert featuring a middle-aged couple dancing to the track in clothing associated with dance festivals before a till bleep brings them back to reality.

=== In sports ===
In the late 2000s, Eric Nichols, a marketing executive for the University of South Carolina, added "Sandstorm" to the playlist of music at Williams-Brice Stadium during a Gamecocks football game. In a 2021 ESPN story, Nichols recalled that he had tried playing the song when he was employed at Vanderbilt University, but the Vanderbilt fanbase was somewhat cool toward it. After moving to South Carolina, he played it at one football game, and received a fan reaction good enough that he decided to save it for a key moment in a later game. That moment would come in the last two minutes of a 2009 game against Ole Miss, when "Sandstorm" was played before back-to-back Gamecocks defensive plays that sealed an upset win over Ole Miss. Since that game, it has become a rallying anthem for South Carolina fans. The song has been used at other Gamecock sporting events, and has become so iconic among Gamecocks fans that some have even used it at their weddings. On November 18, 2023, Darude made an appearance at a Gamecocks football game against Kentucky, performing a set during pre-game festivities as well as manning a booth during the game. South Carolina won 17–14.

Professional wrestlers Toru Owashi and Session Moth Martina as well as mixed martial artist Wanderlei Silva and baseball pitcher Koji Uehara use "Sandstorm" as entrance music. It was also played at the 2006 Winter Olympics, and during the Ice Hockey World Championships. Nike used the composition in an advertisement series featuring the basketball opponents Kobe Bryant and LeBron James. Kansas State University briefly used "Sandstorm" at men's basketball games, but banned it after the school's student section punctuated the track with chants of "F*** KU!" during games against archrival Kansas; the school has more recently tried reintroducing it.

Premier League football club Nottingham Forest plays the song before the start of second half during home games at the City Ground. The song was used as the main theme song for the 2024 Copa América football tournament, with it playing before the start of every match.

=== Internet phenomenon ===
The popularity of "Sandstorm" as background music for those who stream their video gaming on the Twitch platform led to a meme that any question asking for the name of any song was replied to with the comment "Darude – Sandstorm".

As an April Fools' Day joke on 1 April 2015, YouTube displayed the message "Did you mean: Darude – Sandstorm by Darude" for all video search queries that involve music, in addition to adding a button which played the song during a video.

== Sandstorm Run 2025 ==
To mark the 25th anniversary of the song, the Sandstorm Run took place in Helsinki on 31 August 2025, following the original route of the music video. The route stretched over 6.7 kilometres (4.2 mi) and could be completed as a walk, a fun run, or a race. Darude cheered on the participants. A quarter of the proceeds were donated to the youth work of the Suomen Urheiluliitto, the Finnish Athletics Federation.

== See also ==
- List of number-one songs in Norway
- Music of Finland
