= Sebastian Rejman =

Finnish musician and actor (born 1978)

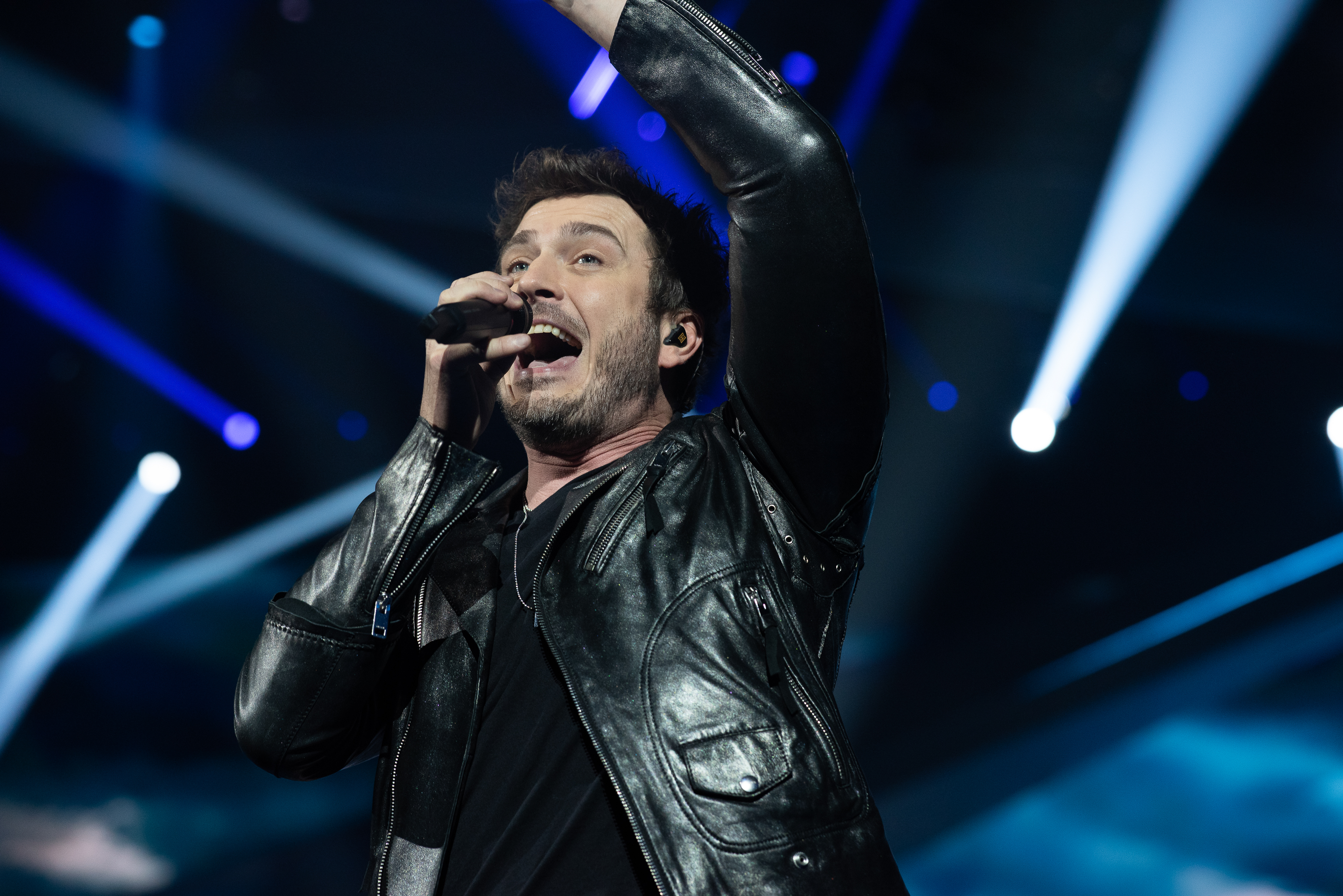
- Rejman in 2019

Background information
- Born: Sebastian Rejman; 13 January 1978 (age 48); Helsinki, Finland
- Genres: Pop
- Occupations: Singer; actor; television host
- Instruments: Vocals; guitar
- Years active: 2005–present

Sebastian Rejman (born 13 January 1978) is a Finnish singer, actor, and television host. He is the singer and guitarist of the band The Giant Leap. While Giant Leap has been on hiatus, Rejman founded a new band called Sebastian & The 4th Line Band.

He represented Finland in the Eurovision Song Contest 2019 along with Darude. After performing 3rd in the 1st semi-final they didn't receive enough votes to place in the top 10 and failed to qualify for the Grand final.

He has appeared in the medical television drama Syke.

== Personal life ==
Rejman was born into a bilingual family, speaking both Finnish and Swedish. He has a son (born 2016) and a daughter (born 2019) with actress Iina Kuustonen.

== Discography ==
Awards and achievements
Preceded by Saara Aalto with "Monsters"	Finland in the Eurovision Song Contest; 2019	Succeeded by Aksel Kankaanranta with "Looking Back"
