= Destiny (singer) =

Maltese singer (born 2002)

Destiny M.Q.R.
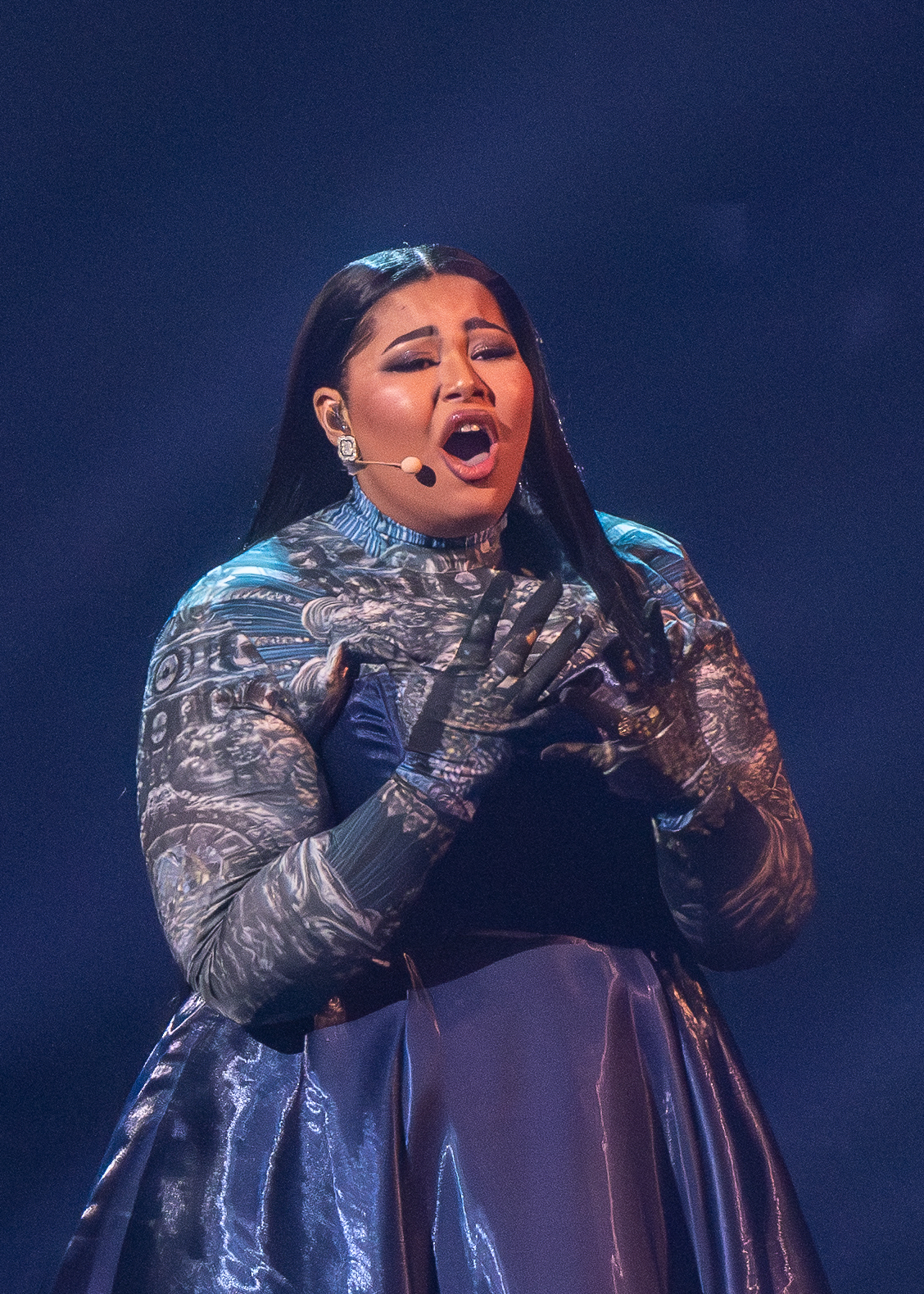
- Destiny in 2025

Background information
- Also known as: Destiny
- Born: Destiny Chukunyere; 29 August 2002 (age 24); Birkirkara, Malta
- Genres: Pop; R&B; soul; funk
- Occupation: Singer
- Instrument: Vocals
- Years active: 2013–present
- Website: destiny.mt

Destiny Chukunyere M.Q.R. (born 29 August 2002), known mononymously as Destiny, is a Maltese singer. She won the Junior Eurovision Song Contest 2015, where she represented Malta with the song "Not My Soul".

In 2017, she participated in the eleventh series of Britain's Got Talent and finished 6th in the second semi-final and thus was eliminated. She won the second season of the Maltese version of The X Factor and was chosen to represent Malta in the Eurovision Song Contest 2020 in Rotterdam with the song "All of My Love" before the contest was canceled due to the COVID-19 pandemic. Instead, Destiny represented Malta in the Eurovision Song Contest 2021, this time with the song "Je me casse", where she finished in 7th place with 255 points.

== Early life ==
Chukunyere was born on 29 August 2002. She lives in Birkirkara and attended a secondary school in Ħamrun. Her father is Igbo Nigerian former footballer Ndubisi Chukunyere, while her mother is Maltese. She has two younger siblings; a sister named Melody and a brother named Isaiah.

== Career ==
Prior to her participation in the Junior Eurovision, Chukunyere participated in various singing competitions including Festival Kanzunetta Indipendenza 2014 in which she placed third with the song "Festa t'Ilwien"; and won the Asterisks Music Festival, and SanRemo Junior in Italy.

=== 2015–2017: Junior Eurovision Song Contest ===
On 11 July 2015, Chukunyere won the Maltese national final held at the Mediterranean Conference Centre in Valletta. She represented Malta at the Junior Eurovision Song Contest 2015, in Sofia, Bulgaria on 21 November.

Chukunyere won the live national final with the Aretha Franklin song "Think", enabling her to represent Malta; her Junior Eurovision entry called "Not My Soul" was composed by Elton Zarb and written by Muxu with her involvement. Chukunyere won the contest with 185 points breaking the previous record score set by María Isabel in 2004.

On 13 December 2015, Chukunyere and her team were awarded the Midalja għall-Qadi tar-Repubblika.

=== 2017–2019: Britain's Got Talent ===
In early 2017, Chukunyere auditioned for series 11 of ITV's Britain's Got Talent singing "Think", by Aretha Franklin, where she was given four yeses. Her audition was aired on 20 May. She has received praise from established music critic Simon Cowell and international renowned tenor Joseph Calleja. After listening and watching her perform, Cowell told to the rest of the judges that they "have been waiting for someone to come out who ... could be a star, and Destiny may be the one." On 27 May, she was announced as one of the qualifiers to the live shows and performed in the second semi-final on 30 May. She placed 6th in the semi-final and thus was eliminated.

Britain's Got Talent Performances
	Song	Original Artist
Audition	"Think"	Aretha Franklin
Semi-final	"Respect"	Otis Redding

=== 2019–2020: X Factor Malta ===
In 2019, Chukunyere appeared in the Eurovision Song Contest 2019 in Tel Aviv, Israel as a backing singer for the Maltese entrant's, Michela Pace, song "Chameleon". The song qualified for the final, finishing in 14th place with 107 points.

In 2019, Chukunyere was revealed to be taking part in the second season of X Factor Malta. She was placed in the Girls category, mentored by Ira Losco, and advanced to the live shows. On 8 February 2020, she won the competition.

X Factor Malta Performances
	Song	Original Artist(s)	Notes
Audition	"Giving Myself"	Jennifer Hudson	4 "Yes" votes
Bootcamp	"The Voice Within"	Christina Aguilera	
Six Chair Challenge	"Don't Call Me Up"	Mabel	
Judges' House	"It's a Man's Man's Man's World"	James Brown	
Live Shows	"Higher Love"	Steve Winwood	
Live Shows	"I Will Survive"	Gloria Gaynor	
Live Shows	"He Lives in You"	Lebo M	
Semi-final	"And I Am Telling You I'm Not Going"	Jennifer Holliday	
Semi-final	"This Is Me"	Keala Settle and The Greatest Showman Ensemble	
Final	"Save the Hero"	Destiny Chukunyere	
Final	"River Deep – Mountain High"	Ike & Tina Turner	Duet with Amelia Lily
Final	"Fejn Staħbejtli"	Ira Losco	
Final	"He Lives in You"	Lebo M	

=== 2020–2021: Eurovision Song Contest ===
Due to her X Factor Malta win, Chukunyere was to represent Malta in the Eurovision Song Contest 2020, taking place in Rotterdam, Netherlands. Her entry song, "All of My Love", was released on 9 March 2020. However, on 18 March, the event was cancelled due to the COVID-19 pandemic. On 16 May 2020, it was confirmed that Chukunyere would represent Malta at the 2021 contest with the song "Je me casse". Her 2021 entry was released on 15 March 2021 on the official YouTube channel of the Eurovision Song Contest. "Je me casse" was released on all major streaming services on 22 March 2021. She placed seventh in the final with 255 points, receiving 208 points from the juries and 47 points from the public.

=== 2022–present: The Voice Kids Malta ===
On 15 July 2022, it was announced that Chukunyere would be featured as a coach on the first season of The Voice Kids Malta.

On 15 May 2025, she performed alongside Gjon's Tears, Samira Efendi and The Roop during an interval act of the second semi-final of the Eurovision Song Contest 2025 dedicated to songs of the 2020 contest that couldn't be performed due to the contest's cancellation.

In the latter half of 2025, Destiny returned for the second season of The Voice Kids Malta as a coach; her artist Eliza Borg won the final on 18 October 2025, making Destiny the winning coach.

== Musical style and influences ==
Chukunyere has named Aretha Franklin, Beyoncé, and Lizzo as her biggest idols and inspirations.

== Discography ==
=== Singles ===
Title	Year	Peak chart positions							Album
Title	Year	MLT	BEL (FL)	IRE	NLD	SWE	SWI	UK Down.	Album
"All of My Love" (with B-Ok)	2020	—	—	—	—	—	—	—	Non-album singles
"Je me casse"	2021	1	48	79	36	31	83	41	Non-album singles
"I Promise"	2026	—	—	—	—	—	—	—	Non-album singles
"—" denotes items which were not released in that country or failed to chart.

==== Promotional singles ====
Title	Year	Album
"Festa t'Ilwien"	2014	Non-album singles
"Embrace"	2016	Non-album singles
"Fast Life (Ladidadi)"	2016	Non-album singles

Awards and achievements
Preceded by Federica Falzon with "Diamonds"	Malta in the Junior Eurovision Song Contest; 2015	Succeeded by Christina Magrin with "Parachute"
Preceded by (Italy) Vincenzo Cantiello with "Tu primo grande amore"	Winner of the Junior Eurovision Song Contest; 2015	Succeeded by (Georgia (country)) Mariam Mamadashvili with "Mzeo"
Preceded by Michela Pace with "Chameleon"	Malta in the Eurovision Song Contest; 2020 (cancelled)	Succeeded by Herself with "Je me casse"
Preceded by Herself with "All of My Love"	Malta in the Eurovision Song Contest; 2021	Succeeded by Emma Muscat with "I Am What I Am"

Preceded by (Georgia (country)) David Aladashvili and Liza Tsiklauri	Junior Eurovision Song Contest presenter 2026; With: Gaia Cauchi and Keane Cutajar	Succeeded by Incumbent
