= Malta in the Eurovision Song Contest 2020 =

- Eurovision Song Contest 2020
- Participating broadcaster: Public Broadcasting Services (PBS)
- Country: Malta
- Selection process: Artist: X Factor Malta; Song: Internal selection
- Selection date: Artist: 8 February 2020; Song: 9 March 2020

Competing entry
- Song: "All of My Love"
- Artist: Destiny
- Songwriters: Bernarda Brunović; Borislav Milanov; Sebastian Arman; Dag Lundberg; Joacim Persson; Cesár Sampson

Placement
- Final result: Contest cancelled

Participation chronology

Malta was set to be represented at the Eurovision Song Contest 2020 with the song "All of My Love", written by Bernarda Brunović, Borislav Milanov, Sebastian Arman, Dag Lundberg, Joacim Persson, and Cesár Sampson, and performed by Destiny. The Maltese participating broadcaster, Public Broadcasting Services (PBS), selected its performer through the second season of the music competition X Factor Malta, after which the song was internally selected. The competition concluded with a final on 8 February 2020 where Destiny eventually emerged as the winner. Her song for Eurovision, "All of My Love", was internally selected later and was released to the public on 9 March. Destiny had represented Malta at the Junior Eurovision Song Contest 2015, which won with the song "Not My Soul". Songwriter Cesár Sampson had represented Austria in 2018 where he achieved third place with the song "Nobody but You".

Malta was drawn to compete in the first semi-final of the Eurovision Song Contest which was to take place on 12 May 2020. However, the contest was cancelled due to the COVID-19 pandemic.

== Background ==
Prior to the 2020 contest, the Maltese Broadcasting Authority (MBA) until 1975, and the Public Broadcasting Services (PBS) since 1991, had participated in the Eurovision Song Contest representing Malta thirty-two times since MBA's first entry in 1971. MBA briefly competed in the contest in the 1970s before withdrawing for sixteen years. PBS had, to this point, competed in every contest since returning in 1991. Their best placing in the contest thus far was second, which it achieved on two occasions: in 2002 with the song "7th Wonder" performed by Ira Losco and in the 2005 with the song "Angel" performed by Chiara. In 2019, "Chameleon" performed by Michela Pace qualified to the final and placed 14th.

As part of its duties as participating broadcaster, PBS organises the selection of its entry in the Eurovision Song Contest and broadcasts the event in the country. The broadcaster confirmed its intentions to participate in the 2020 contest on 25 September 2019. In 2019, PBS utilised the newly created talent show format X Factor Malta, a method that was continued for their 2020 participation, which resulted in the selection of a winning performer that would subsequently be given an internally selected song to perform at Eurovision.

== Before Eurovision ==
=== X Factor Malta ===
The Maltese artist for the Eurovision Song Contest 2020 was selected through the second season of X Factor Malta, the Maltese version of the British television reality music competition The X Factor created by Simon Cowell. The second season premiered on 6 October 2019 and concluded with a final on 8 February 2020. In addition to selecting the Maltese Eurovision entrant, the winner also secured a record contract with Sony Music Italy. All shows in the competition were hosted by actor Ben Camille and broadcast on Television Malta (TVM) as well on the broadcaster's website tvm.com.mt.

==== Selection process ====
Acts of 15 years of age and over were able to submit their applications starting from 20 January 2019 by WhatsApp messaging a video audition. The chosen auditionees as determined by the show's producers to progress through the selection process were invited to the last set of auditions that took place in front of the judges between 24 and 27 June 2019 at the Esplora Interactive Science Centre in Kalkara. The four judges were:

- Ira Losco – Singer-songwriter, represented Malta in 2002 and in 2016
- Howard Keith Debono – Music producer
- Ray Mercieca – Singer-songwriter and musician, lead singer of the band The Rifffs
- Alexandra Alden – Singer-songwriter

120 contestants were selected by the judges to progress to the bootcamp round, which they were split into the four category groups - Boys, Girls, Overs and Groups, and were given one song to sing a cappella. 30 acts were eliminated and the remaining 90 acts each selected a song from the Wall of Songs, which they had to perform with three others who had selected the same song. In the final challenge, the remaining acts, including newly formed groups, performed a song of their own choice and the judges selected a total of 37 acts to go through to the Six Chair Challenge filmed at the Malta Fairs & Conventions Centre in Attard on 20 and 21 September 2019. 24 acts advanced to the Judges' Houses, broadcast on 22 and 29 December 2019, during which the four judges eliminated 3 acts from each category with a total of 12 acts advancing to the live shows.

==== Live shows ====
Key:

– Winner
– Runner-up
– Third Place

Category (mentor)	Acts		
Boys (Mercieca)	Kyle Cutajar	Dav. Jr	Karl Schembri
Girls (Losco)	Jasmine Abela	Destiny Chukunyere	Justine Shorfid
Overs (Alden)	Ed Abdilla	Celine Agius	Paul Anthony
Groups (Debono)	Bloodline	F.A.I.T.H	Yazmin and James

=== Song selection ===
On 9 March 2020, PBS announced that Destiny would perform the song "All of My Love" at the Eurovision Song Contest 2020. "All of My Love" was written by members of the songwriting team Symphonix International: Bernarda Brunović, Borislav Milanov, Sebastian Arman, Dag Lundberg, Joacim Persson and former Eurovision entrant Cesár Sampson who represented Austria in 2018. The release of the song and official music video was made available online on the broadcaster's website tvm.com.mt and the official Eurovision Song Contest's YouTube channel.

== At Eurovision ==
According to Eurovision rules, all nations with the exceptions of the host country and the "Big Five" (France, Germany, Italy, Spain and the United Kingdom) are required to qualify from one of two semi-finals in order to compete for the final; the top ten countries from each semi-final progress to the final. The European Broadcasting Union (EBU) split up the competing countries into six different pots based on voting patterns from previous contests, with countries with favourable voting histories put into the same pot. On 28 January 2020, an allocation draw was held which placed each country into one of the two semi-finals, as well as which half of the show they would perform in. Malta was placed into the first semi-final, to be held on 12 May 2020, and was scheduled to perform in the second half of the show. However, due to the COVID-19 pandemic, the contest was cancelled.

Prior to the Eurovision Song Celebration YouTube broadcast in place of the semi-finals, it was revealed that Malta was set to perform in position 10, following the entry from Belgium and before the entry from Croatia.
