= Je me casse =

2021 single by Destiny Chukunyere

Single by Destiny
- Language: English
- Released: 15 March 2021
- Genre: Dance-pop, Electro-swing
- Length: 2:58
- Label: Jagged House, Sony Music Sweden
- Songwriter(s): Amanuel Dermont; Malin Christin; Nicklas Eklund; Pete Barringer

Destiny singles chronology
| "All of My Love" (2020) | "Je me casse" (2021) |

Music video
- "Je me casse" on YouTube

Eurovision Song Contest 2021 entry
- Country: Malta
- Artist(s): Destiny Chukunyere
- As: Destiny
- Language: English
- Composer(s): Amanuel Dermont; Malin Christin; Nicklas Eklund; Pete Barringer
- Lyricist(s): Amanuel Dermont; Malin Christin; Nicklas Eklund; Pete Barringer

Finals performance
- Semi-final result: 1st
- Semi-final points: 325
- Final result: 7th
- Final points: 255

Entry chronology
- ◄ "All of My Love" (2020)
- "I Am What I Am" (2022) ►

"Je me casse" (pronounced [ʒə mə kɑs, - kas]; French for 'I'm out of here', lit. 'I'm breaking off') is a song by Maltese singer Destiny Chukunyere that represented Malta in the Eurovision Song Contest 2021. The song was written and composed by Amanuel Dermont, Malin Christin, Nicklas Eklund and Pete Barringer.

== Eurovision Song Contest ==
The song was selected to represent Malta in the Eurovision Song Contest 2021, after Destiny was internally selected by the national broadcaster. The semi-finals of the 2021 contest featured the same line-up of countries as determined by the draw for the 2020 contest's semi-finals. Malta was placed into the first semi-final, held on 18 May 2021, and performed in the second half of the show.

== Release and promotion ==
"Je me casse" was made available for digital download and streaming by Jagged House on 22 March 2021.

== Charts ==
Chart performance for "Je me casse"
| Chart (2021) | Peak position |
|---|---|
| Belgium (Ultratop 50 Flanders) | 48 |
| Greece (IFPI) | 28 |
| Iceland (Tónlistinn) | 8 |
| Ireland (IRMA) | 79 |
| Lithuania (AGATA) | 17 |
| Malta Airplay (Radiomonitor) | 1 |
| Netherlands (Single Top 100) | 36 |
| Poland (Polish Airplay Top 100) | 52 |
| Sweden (Sverigetopplistan) | 31 |
| Switzerland (Schweizer Hitparade) | 83 |
| UK Singles Downloads (OCC) | 41 |

== Release history ==
Release history and formats for "Je me casse"
| Region | Date | Format(s) | Label | Ref. |
|---|---|---|---|---|
| Various | 22 March 2021 | Digital download; streaming | Jagged Music; Sony Music | |
