= Michela Pace =

Maltese singer (born 2001)

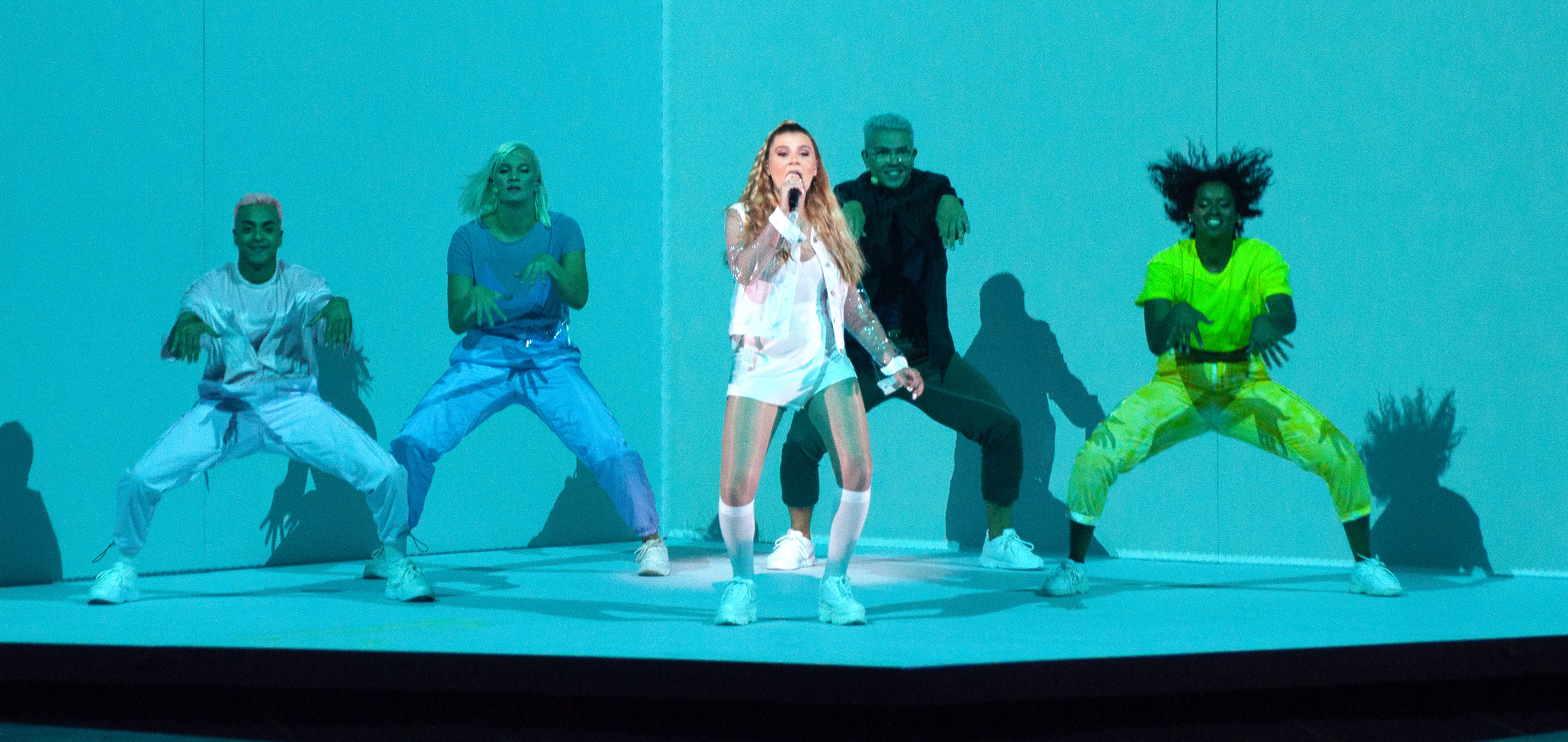

Background information
- Born: 25 January 2001 (age 25); Gozo, Malta
- Genre: Pop
- Occupation: Singer
- Years active: 2017–present
- Label: Sony Italy
- Website: https://michela.mt/

Michela Pace (Maltese pronunciation: [mɪˈkɛːlɐ ˈpɐːt͡ʃ]; born 25 January 2001) is a Maltese singer who won the inaugural season of Malta's version of The X Factor in 2019. As a prize for her win, she represented Malta at the Eurovision Song Contest 2019 with the song "Chameleon" written by Joacim Persson; Paula Winger; Borislav Milanov and Johan Alkenäs, where she finished in 14th place with 107 points. Pace has also secured a contract with Sony Music Italy. She is of Greek and Italian descent.

== Discography ==
=== Singles ===
Title	Year	Peak chart positions								Album
Title	Year	MLT Dom. Air.	EST	GRE	NLD	ICE	LTU	SCO	SWE	Album
"Chameleon"	2019	7	29	65	73	38	23	86	69	Non-album singles
"Say It First"	2020	—	—	—	—	—	—	—	—	Non-album singles
"Ritrova te stesso"	2020	—	—	—	—	—	—	—	—	Non-album singles
"Lost in the Shadows"	2022	—	—	—	—	—	—	—	—	Non-album singles
"—" denotes a recording that did not chart or was not released in that territory.

=== Featured singles ===
List of singles as featured artist, with selected chart positions, showing year released and album name
Title	Year	Peak chart positions	Album
Title	Year	MLT Dom. Air.	Album
"Cannonball" (Ira Losco featuring Michela)	2019	—	Non-album singles
"Say It First" (B-OK featuring Michela)	2020	—	Non-album singles
"One More" (The New Victorians featuring Michela)	2021	—	Non-album singles
"Skin Deep" (Maxine featuring Destiny, Michela, and Gaia Cauchi)	2022	—	Non-album singles
"Welcome Here" (Fr Rob Galea featuring Michela)	2022	—	Non-album singles
"Tridx tkun tiegħi dan il-milied?" (The Travellers featuring Ira Losco, Gianluca, and Michela)	2023	—	Non-album singles
"Under Pressure" (Matthew James featuring Michela)	2024	4	Non-album singles
"—" denotes a recording that did not chart or was not released in that territory.

=== Awards ===
- 2019: Lovin Music Awards - Best Upcoming Female & Best Music Video (Chameleon)
- 2020: Malta Music Awards - Breakthrough Artist & Best Video (Chameleon), nominated: Best Song (Chameleon & Cannonball)
- 2020: Bay Music Awards - Best Music Video (Cannonball), nominated: Best Female & Best Song (Cannonball & Say it first)

== Personal life ==
Pace became engaged to be married to long-term boyfriend Daniel Farrugia on 1 January 2023. Their wedding took place at Ta' Pinu National Shrine and Sanctuary in Gozo on 5 July 2025.

Preceded by Christabelle with "Taboo"	Malta in the Eurovision Song Contest; 2019	Succeeded by Destiny Chukunyere with "All of My Love"
