= X Factor Malta =

- Genre: Reality competition
- Created by: Simon Cowell
- Directed by: Joe Azzopardi; Mark Vassallo
- Creative director: Space Studios Gary Bugeja
- Presented by: Gianni Zammit (4–); Ben Camille (1–3)
- Judges: Howard Keith Debono; Philippa Naudi (3, 5–); Amber Bondin (4–); Aleandro Spiteri Monsigneur (5–); Ira Losco (1–4); Ray Mercieca (1–2); Alexandra Alden (1–2); Ivan Grech (3); Gianluca Bezzina (4)
- Country of origin: Malta
- Original languages: English; Maltese
- No. of seasons: 5

Production
- Executive producers: Anton Attard; Mark Grech
- Producer: Annaliz Azzopardi
- Editors: Space Studios; Joe Azzopardi; Gary Bugeja; Kristina Azzopardi

Original release
- Network: TVM
- Release: October 7, 2018 – present

Related
- Malta's Got Talent

X Factor Malta is the Maltese version of the British television music competition The X Factor, created by Simon Cowell. The first season premiered on 7 October 2018 and has since been broadcast on Television Malta. The show was used to determine the artist that would represent Malta in the Eurovision Song Contest in 2019 and 2020. In July 2020, it was announced that the show would be replaced by Malta's Got Talent, but after a one-year hiatus, a third season began in October 2021. Season four started on 8 October 2023.

== Season summary ==
To date, five seasons have been broadcast, as summarised below.

Contestant in "Ray Mercieca"
Contestant in "Alexandra Alden"
Contestant in "Howard Keith Debono"
Contestant in "Ira Losco"
Contestant in "Ivan Grech"
Contestant in "Philippa Naudi"
Contestant in "Gianluca Bezzina"
Contestant in "Amber Bondin"
Contestant in "Aleandro Spiteri Monsigneur"

Season	Start	Finish	Winner	Runner-up	Third place	Fourth place	Winning mentor	Main host	Main judges
1	7 October 2018	26 January 2019	Michela Pace	Owen Leuellen	Nicole Frendo	Petra Zammit	Howard Keith Debono	Ben Camille	Howard Keith Debono; Ira Losco; Alexandra Alden; Ray Mercieca
2	6 October 2019	8 February 2020	Destiny Chukunyere	Justine Shorfid	F.A.I.T.H	Kyle Cutajar	Ira Losco	Ben Camille	Howard Keith Debono; Ira Losco; Alexandra Alden; Ray Mercieca
3	3 October 2021	12 February 2022	Ryan Hili	Lisa Gauci	Aidan Drakard	Cheryl Balzan	Howard Keith Debono	Ben Camille	Howard Keith Debono; Ira Losco; Ivan Grech; Philippa Naudi
4	8 October 2023	11 February 2024	Richard Aquilina	Lapes u Nadine	Shanice Micallef	Amelia Kalabic	Howard Keith Debono	Gianni Zammit	Howard Keith Debono; Ira Losco; Gianluca Bezzina; Amber Bondin
5	11 January 2026	21 February 2026	Lisa Gauci	Miguel Bonello	Jasmine Abela	Amelia Kalabic	Philippa Naudi	Gianni Zammit	Howard Keith Debono; Philippa Naudi; Amber Bondin; Aleandro Spiteri Monsigneur

== Judges' categories and their contestants ==
In each season, each judge is allocated a category to mentor and chooses three acts to progress to the live finals. This table shows, for each series, which category each judge was allocated and which acts he or she put through to the live finals.

Key:

– Winning judge/category. Winners are in bold, eliminated contestants in small font.

Season	Howard Keith Debono	Ira Losco	Alexandra Alden	Ray Mercieca
**1**	**Girls**; **Michela Pace**; Nicole Frendo; Kelsey Bellante	**Boys**; Owen Leuellen; Luke Chappell; Norbert Bondin	**Groups**; 4th Line; Xtreme; Kayati	**Overs**; Petra Zammit; Ben Purplle; Franklin Calleja
**2**	**Groups**; F.A.I.T.H; Bloodline; Yazmin & James	**Girls**; **Destiny Chukunyere**; Justine Shorfid; Jasmine Abela	**Overs**; Celine Agius; Paul Anthony; Ed Abdilla	**Boys**; Kyle Cutajar; Karl Schembri; Dav. Jr
Season	Howard Keith Debono	Ira Losco	Philippa Naudi	Ivan Grech
**3**	**Boys**; **Ryan Hili**; Aidan Drakard; Kevin Paul	**Overs**; Cheryl Balzan; Audrienne Fenech; Jimmy Tyrrell	**Groups**; Ceci & Kriss; Soul Tide; Beyond	**Girls**; Lisa Gauci; Timea Farr; Shauna Vassallo
Season	Howard Keith Debono	Ira Losco	Amber Bondin	Gianluca Bezzina
**4**	**Overs**; **Richard Aquilina**; Rose Marielle Mamaclay; Sean Kamati	**Groups**; Lapes & Nadine; XO; Kelsie & Martina	**Boys**; Isaac Tom; Kodin Camilleri; Mattia Adduocchio	**Girls**; Shanice Micallef; Amelia Kalabic; Kristy Spiteri
Season	Howard Keith Debono	Philippa Naudi	Amber Bondin	Aleandro Spiteri Monsigneur
**5**	Miguel Bonello; Amelia Kalabic; Lapes & Nadine	**Lisa Gauci**; Bloodline; Maya Sesay	Owen Leuellen; Kyle George Cutajar; Mamaclay	Jasmine Abela; Shanice Micallef; Shauna Vassallo

== Presenter and judges ==
On 2 July 2018, it was announced that Ben Camille was selected to host the show. From Season 4, Gianni Zammit hosted the show instead after Ben Camille's 3 seasons hosting the program.

The full judges' panel was revealed on 31 July 2018, and was composed of music producer Howard Keith Debono, The Rifffs' frontman Ray Mercieca, Maltese singer and songwriter Alexandra Alden, and singer/star Ira Losco.

== Season 1 ==
=== Pre-auditions ===
The first appeal for applicants was made on 26 June 2018, with the launch of the online submission form. Auditioning artists were also able to send a video audition via the WhatsApp messaging platform. In addition, a number of pop-up booths were set up around Malta in early July to encourage people to enter.

Producers auditions were held from 13 to 15 July at Fort St Elmo. There the show's producers assessed the auditioning acts and determined who would progress to the judges auditions.

=== Judges' auditions ===
The auditionees chosen by the producers were invited back to the last set of auditions that took place in front of the judges. These auditions were filmed at Fort St Angelo from 1 to 8 August and broadcast from 7 October, as well as short daily extra auditions on the X Factor Malta YouTube channel and on the Facebook page of Vodafone Malta.

The 120 successful contestants then progressed to the bootcamp round.

=== Bootcamp ===
The bootcamp round was filmed at the Hilton Malta Conference Centre from 9 to 12 September and broadcast on 11 and 18 November.

Contestants were given three performance challenges. On the first day, the 120 contestants were split into the four category groups - Boys, Girls, Overs and Groups. Acts in each category were given one song to sing a cappella: "A Million Reasons" (Girls), "See You Again" (Boys), "Don’t Let the Sun Go Down On Me" (Overs) "My Girl" (Groups). After the performances, the judges sent home 30 acts.

For the second challenge, the remaining acts each selected a song from the Wall of Songs, which they had to perform with three others who had selected the same song. Contestants were either put through to the next stage, or went to the Waiting Room, where they later had the possibility of being called on to be part of a newly formed group.

In the final challenge, the remaining acts - including newly formed groups - performed a song of their own choice. The jury then selected 12 participants from each category to go through to the Six Chair Challenge.

=== Six Chair Challenge ===
The Six Chair Challenge was filmed at the Malta Fairs & Conventions Centre (MFCC) in Attard on 11 and 12 October 2018.

The 24 successful acts were:

- Boys: Mark Anthony Bartolo, Norbert Bondin, Aidan Cassar, Luke Chappell, Owen Leuellen, Claudio Zammit
- Girls: Kelsey Bellante, Karin Duff, Nicole Frendo, Danica Muscat, Michela Pace, Jade Vella
- Overs: Anna Azzopardi, Franklin Calleja, Anna Faniello, Ben Purplle, Vanessa Lee Sultana, Petra Zammit
- Groups: 4th Line, Horizon, Kayati, Prism, Systm12, Xtreme

=== Judges' Houses ===
The Judges' Houses episodes were broadcast on 23 and 30 December 2018.

Summary of Judges' Houses
Judge	Category	Assistant	Contestants eliminated
Losco	Boys	Joseph Calleja	Mark Anthony Bartolo, Aidan Cassar, Claudio Zammit
Debono	Girls	Mike Hedges	Karin Duff, Danica Muscat, Jade Vella
Mercieca	Overs	Matthew James Borg	Anna Azzopardi, Anna Faniello, Vanessa Lee Sultana
Alden	Groups	Carlo Borg Bonaci	Horizon, Prism, Systm12

=== Contestants ===
Key:

– Winner
– Runner-up
– Third Place

Category (mentor)	Acts		
Boys (Losco)	Norbert Bondin	Luke Chappell	Owen Leuellen
Girls (Debono)	Kelsey Bellante	Nicole Frendo	Michela Pace
Overs (Mercieca)	Franklin Calleja	Ben Purplle	Petra Zammit
Groups (Alden)	4th Line	Kayati	Xtreme

=== Live shows ===
The live shows began on Sunday, 6 January 2019. They were filmed at the Malta Fairs & Conventions Centre (MFCC) in Attard, Malta. Dance groups contracted for all live shows were The Unit Collective (Deedee Clark, Kimberly Lowell, Nicole Schembri), Southville Dancers (Christian Scerri), Kinetic Dance Academy (Clayton Mifsud, Daphne Gatt) and Annalise Dance Studio (Annalise Ellul).

=== Results summary ===
Colour key
– Contestant in the bottom three and had to perform in the Sing-Off
– Contestant was in the bottom three but received the fewest votes and was immediately eliminated
– Contestant received the fewest public votes and was immediately eliminated (no final showdown)

Contestant	Week 1	Week 2	Week 3		Week 4		
Contestant	Week 1	Week 2	Round One	Round Two	Round One	Round Two	Round Three
Michela Pace	Safe	Safe	Safe	Safe	Safe	Safe	Winner
Owen Leuellen	Safe	Safe	Safe	4th	Safe	Safe	Runner-Up
Nicole Frendo	Safe	Safe	Safe	Safe	Safe	3rd	Eliminated (week 4)
Petra Zammit	Safe	Safe	Safe	Safe	4th	Eliminated (week 4)	
Luke Chappell	Safe	Safe	Safe	5th	Eliminated (week 3)		
Norbert Bondin	Safe	Safe	Safe	6th	Eliminated (week 3)		
Ben Purplle	Safe	8th	7th	Eliminated (week 3)			
Kelsey Bellante	Safe	Safe	8th	Eliminated (week 3)			
4th Line	Safe	9th	Eliminated (week 2)				
Xtreme	Bottom three	10th	Eliminated (week 2)				
Franklin Calleja	Bottom three	Eliminated (week 1)					
Kayati	12th	Eliminated (week 1)					
Sing-Off	Franklin Calleja, Xtreme	4th Line, Ben Purplle	No Sing Off or Judges Vote. The two acts with the fewest votes will leave the competition.	Owen Leuellen, Luke Chappell	No Sing Off or Judges Vote, the public votes decide who wins.		
Alden's vote to eliminate	Franklin Calleja	Ben Purplle	No Sing Off or Judges Vote. The two acts with the fewest votes will leave the competition.	Owen Leuellen	No Sing Off or Judges Vote, the public votes decide who wins.		
Debono's vote to eliminate	Franklin Calleja	Ben Purplle	No Sing Off or Judges Vote. The two acts with the fewest votes will leave the competition.	Owen Leuellen	No Sing Off or Judges Vote, the public votes decide who wins.		
Losco's vote to eliminate	Franklin Calleja	4th Line	No Sing Off or Judges Vote. The two acts with the fewest votes will leave the competition.	Luke Chappell	No Sing Off or Judges Vote, the public votes decide who wins.		
Mercieca's vote to eliminate	Xtreme	4th Line	No Sing Off or Judges Vote. The two acts with the fewest votes will leave the competition.	Luke Chappell	No Sing Off or Judges Vote, the public votes decide who wins.		
Eliminated	Kayati; Public vote Franklin Calleja; 3 of 4 votes Majority	Xtreme; Public vote 4th Line; 2 of 4 votes Deadlock	Kelsey Bellante; Public vote Ben Purplle; Public vote	Norbert Bondin; Public vote Luke Chappell; 2 of 4 votes Deadlock	Michela Pace		
Eliminated	Kayati; Public vote Franklin Calleja; 3 of 4 votes Majority	Xtreme; Public vote 4th Line; 2 of 4 votes Deadlock	Kelsey Bellante; Public vote Ben Purplle; Public vote	Norbert Bondin; Public vote Luke Chappell; 2 of 4 votes Deadlock	Owen Leuellen		
Eliminated	Kayati; Public vote Franklin Calleja; 3 of 4 votes Majority	Xtreme; Public vote 4th Line; 2 of 4 votes Deadlock	Kelsey Bellante; Public vote Ben Purplle; Public vote	Norbert Bondin; Public vote Luke Chappell; 2 of 4 votes Deadlock	Nicole Frendo		
Eliminated	Kayati; Public vote Franklin Calleja; 3 of 4 votes Majority	Xtreme; Public vote 4th Line; 2 of 4 votes Deadlock	Kelsey Bellante; Public vote Ben Purplle; Public vote	Norbert Bondin; Public vote Luke Chappell; 2 of 4 votes Deadlock	Petra Zammit		

=== Live show details ===
==== Week 1 (6 Jan) ====
- Theme: This is Me

Contestants' performances on the first live show
Act	Order	Song	Result
4th Line	1	"Survivor"	Safe
Luke Chappell	2	"Overthinking" (original song)	Safe
Nicole Frendo	3	"Too Good at Goodbyes"	Safe
Franklin Calleja	4	"Jealous"	Bottom three
Xtreme	5	"Side to Side"/"Woman Like Me"	Bottom three
Michela Pace	6	"Lost on You"	Safe
Norbert Bondin	7	"Say Something"	Safe
Kayati	8	"Nobody's Perfect"	Eliminated
Ben Purplle	9	"Dancing On My Own"	Safe
Owen Leuellen	10	"Can't Hold Us"	Safe
Petra Zammit	11	"What's Up?"	Safe
Kelsey Bellante	12	"Chained to the Rhythm"	Safe
Final showdown details
Act	Order	Song	Result
Franklin Calleja	1	"Clown"	Eliminated
Xtreme	2	"Take Me Home"	Safe

Judges' vote to eliminate

- Mercieca: Xtreme
- Alden: Franklin Calleja
- Losco: Franklin Calleja
- Debono: Franklin Calleja

==== Week 2 (13 Jan) ====
- Theme: Throwbacks

Contestants' performances on the second live show
Act	Order	Song	Result
Xtreme	1	"They Don't Care About Us"	Eliminated
Kelsey Bellante	2	"Could You Be Loved"	Safe
Owen Leuellen	3	"Boom! Shake the Room"	Safe
Ben Purplle	4	"Yesterday"	Bottom three
4th Line	5	"It's Raining Men"	Bottom three
Petra Zammit	6	"I Just Want to Make Love to You"	Safe
Luke Chappell	7	"Hey There Delilah"	Safe
Nicole Frendo	8	"Purple Rain"	Safe
Norbert Bondin	9	"The Wild Boys"	Safe
Michela Pace	10	"The Power of Love"	Safe
Final showdown details
Act	Order	Song	Result
Ben Purplle	1	"Iris"	Safe
4th Line	2	"Queen of the Night"	Eliminated

Judges' vote to eliminate

- Mercieca: 4th Line
- Alden: Ben Purplle
- Losco: 4th Line
- Debono: Ben Purplle

With the acts in the sing-off receiving two votes each, the result went to deadlock and reverted to the earlier public vote. 4th Line was eliminated as the act with the fewest public votes.

==== Week 3: Semi-Final (20 Jan) ====
- Theme: Movie Spectacular, Jukebox

Contestants' performances on the third live show
Act	Order	First Song	Result	Order	Second Song	Result
Owen Leuellen	1	"Gangsta's Paradise"	Safe	13	"What Did You Expect" (original song)	Bottom three
Ben Purplle	2	"Oh, Pretty Woman"	Eliminated	N/A (Already eliminated)		
Nicole Frendo	3	"Skyfall"	Safe	14	"Scared to Be Lonely"	Safe
Norbert Bondin	4	"Never Enough"	Safe	11	"Empty Space"	Eliminated
Michela Pace	5	"I Don't Want to Miss a Thing"	Safe	12	"Shallow"	Safe
Luke Chappell	6	"Heathens"	Safe	9	"What Do You Mean?"	Bottom three
Kelsey Bellante	7	"Pray for Me"	Eliminated	N/A (Already eliminated)		
Petra Zammit	8	"We Don't Need Another Hero"	Safe	10	"Set Fire to the Rain"	Safe
Final showdown details
Act		Order		Song		Result
Owen Leuellen		N/A				Safe
Luke Chappell		N/A				Eliminated

Judges' vote to eliminate

- Mercieca: Luke Chappell
- Alden: Owen Leuellen
- Debono: Owen Leuellen
- Losco: Luke Chappell

With the acts in the sing-off receiving two votes each, the result went to deadlock and reverted to the earlier public vote. Luke Chappell was eliminated as the act with the fewest public votes.

In this semi-final, the eight qualified finalists performed at least once. The two acts with the fewest public votes after the first round left the competition, with Kelsey Bellante, gaining the fewest votes overall, and Ben Purplle gaining the second fewest votes. The top six performed again, with the top three acts automatically progressing to the final. The remaining three faced elimination. Of these three, Norbert Bondin received the fewest votes and was thus immediately eliminated. The remaining two, Owen Leuellen and Luke Chappell, faced the tiebreaker, which was to be decided by the judges. However, as the tie was not resolved by the end of the judges' vote, the deadlock - once again decided by the public vote - had to be used. As Owen Leuellen received more votes then Luke Chappell, the former progressed to the final.

==== Week 4: Final (26 Jan) ====
Contestants' performances on the fourth live show
Act	Order	First Song	Order	Second Song	Order	Third Song	Order	Fourth Song	Result
Petra Zammit	1	"You Don't Own Me"	5	"Be My Guest" (with Ray Mercieca)	N/A (Already eliminated)				4th Place
Nicole Frendo	2	"Russian Roulette"	7	"Just Give Me a Reason" (with Matthew James)	10	"Kemm hu Sabiħ" (New Cuorey)	N/A (Already eliminated)		3rd Place
Owen Leuellen	3	"One Day" (Original Song)	6	"Hey Now" (with Ira Losco)	9	"Aħseb fit-tifel" (Shazam)	12	"Believe" (Original Song)	Runner-up
Michela Pace	4	"Total Eclipse of the Heart"	8	"Perfect" (with Joseph Calleja)	11	"Inti Djamant" (The Tramps)	13	"Shallow"	Winner

=== Aired Shows ===
Episode	Air date
Auditions 1	7 October 2018
Auditions 2	14 October 2018
Auditions 3	21 October 2018
Auditions 4	28 October 2018
Auditions 5	4 November 2018
Bootcamp 1	11 November 2018
Bootcamp 2	18 November 2018
Six Chair Challenge 1 (Girls)	25 November 2018
Six Chair Challenge 2 (Boys)	2 December 2018
Six Chair Challenge 3 (Overs)	9 December 2018
Six Chair Challenge 4 (Groups)	16 December 2018
Judges Houses 1 (Girls and Overs)	23 December 2018
Judges Houses 2 (Boys and Groups)	30 December 2018
Live Show 1	6 January 2019
Live Show 2	13 January 2019
Live Show 3	20 January 2019
Live Show 4	26 January 2019

== Season 2 ==
The second season premiered on 6 October 2019. As with the inaugural season, the format continued to serve as the Maltese national selection for the Eurovision Song Contest. The winner of the second season of X Factor Malta would have represented the island nation at the 2020 contest in Rotterdam, Netherlands, but the contest was cancelled due to COVID-19.

=== Six Chair Challenge ===
The 24 successful acts were:

- Boys: Matt Blxck, Kyle Cutajar, Dav. Jr, Giovanni, Karl Schembri, Jurgen Volkov
- Girls: Jasmine Abela, Gail Attard, Marija Bellia, Destiny Chukunyere, Karin Duff, Justine Shorfid
- Overs: Ed Abdilla, Celine Agius, Paul Anthony, Chantal Catania, Kersten Graham, Jozi
- Groups: Bloodline, Chord, F.A.I.T.H, Reign, Sweet Chaos, Yazmin and James

=== Judges' Houses ===
The Judges' Houses episodes were broadcast on 22 and 29 December 2019.

Summary of Judges' Houses
Judge	Category	Assistant	Contestants eliminated
Mercieca	Boys	Amelia Lily	Matt Blxck, Giovanni, Jurgen Volkov
Losco	Girls	Louisa Johnson	Gail Attard, Marija Bellia, Karin Duff
Alden	Overs	The New Victorians	Chantal Catania, Kersten Graham, Jozi
Debono	Groups	Lil' Eddie	Chord, Reign, Sweet Chaos

=== Contestants ===
Key:

– Winner
– Runner-up
– Third Place

Category (mentor)	Acts		
Boys (Mercieca)	Kyle Cutajar	Dav. Jr	Karl Schembri
Girls (Losco)	Jasmine Abela	Destiny Chukunyere	Justine Shorfid
Overs (Alden)	Ed Abdilla	Celine Agius	Paul Anthony
Groups (Debono)	Bloodline	F.A.I.T.H	Yazmin & James

=== Live shows ===
The live shows began on Sunday, 12 January 2020. They were filmed at the Malta Fairs & Conventions Centre (MFCC) in Attard, Malta. Dance groups contracted for all live shows were The Unit Collective (Deedee Clark, Kimberly Lowell, Nicole Schembri), Southville Dancers (Christian Scerri), Kinetic Dance Academy (Clayton Mifsud, Daphne Gatt) and Annalise Dance Studio (Annalise Ellul).

=== Results summary ===
Colour key
– Contestant in the bottom three and had to perform in the Sing-Off
– Contestant was in the bottom three but received the fewest votes and was immediately eliminated
– Contestant received the fewest votes and was immediately eliminated

Contestant	Week 1	Week 2	Week 3	Week 4		Week 5		
Contestant	Week 1	Week 2	Week 3	Round One	Round Two	Round One	Round Two	Round Three
Destiny Chukunyere	Safe	Safe	Safe	Safe	Safe	Safe	Safe	Winner
Justine Shorfid	Safe	Safe	Safe	Safe	Safe	Safe	Safe	Runner-up
F.A.I.T.H	Safe	Safe	Safe	Safe	Safe	Safe	3rd	Eliminated (week 5)
Kyle Cutajar	Safe	Safe	Safe	Safe	Safe	4th	Eliminated (week 5)	
Bloodline	Safe	Safe	Bottom three	Safe	5th	Eliminated (week 4)		
Yazmin & James	Safe	8th	Safe	6th	Eliminated (week 4)			
Celine Agius	Bottom three	Safe	Bottom three	Eliminated (week 3)				
Karl Schembri	Safe	Safe	8th	Eliminated (week 3)				
Dav. Jr	Safe	9th	Eliminated (week 2)					
Jasmine Abela	Safe	10th	Eliminated (week 2)					
Paul Anthony	Bottom three	Eliminated (week 1)						
Ed Abdilla	12th	Eliminated (week 1)						
Sing-Off	Celine Agius, Paul Anthony	Dav. Jr, Yazmin & James	Bloodline, Celine Agius	No Sing Off or Judges Vote. The two acts with the fewest votes will leave the competition.		No Sing Off or Judges Vote, the public votes decide who wins.		
Alden's vote to eliminate	Paul Anthony	Yazmin & James	Bloodline	No Sing Off or Judges Vote. The two acts with the fewest votes will leave the competition.		No Sing Off or Judges Vote, the public votes decide who wins.		
Debono's vote to eliminate	Paul Anthony	Dav. Jr	Celine Agius	No Sing Off or Judges Vote. The two acts with the fewest votes will leave the competition.		No Sing Off or Judges Vote, the public votes decide who wins.		
Losco's vote to eliminate	Paul Anthony	Dav. Jr	Celine Agius	No Sing Off or Judges Vote. The two acts with the fewest votes will leave the competition.		No Sing Off or Judges Vote, the public votes decide who wins.		
Mercieca's vote to eliminate	Paul Anthony	Yazmin & James	Celine Agius	No Sing Off or Judges Vote. The two acts with the fewest votes will leave the competition.		No Sing Off or Judges Vote, the public votes decide who wins.		
Eliminated	Ed Abdilla; Public vote Paul Anthony; 4 of 4 votes Majority	Jasmine Abela; Public vote Dav. Jr; 2 of 4 votes Deadlock	Karl Schembri; Public vote Celine Agius; 3 of 4 votes Majority	Yazmin & James; Public vote	Bloodline; Public vote	Destiny Chukunyere		
Eliminated	Ed Abdilla; Public vote Paul Anthony; 4 of 4 votes Majority	Jasmine Abela; Public vote Dav. Jr; 2 of 4 votes Deadlock	Karl Schembri; Public vote Celine Agius; 3 of 4 votes Majority	Yazmin & James; Public vote	Bloodline; Public vote	Justine Shorfid		
Eliminated	Ed Abdilla; Public vote Paul Anthony; 4 of 4 votes Majority	Jasmine Abela; Public vote Dav. Jr; 2 of 4 votes Deadlock	Karl Schembri; Public vote Celine Agius; 3 of 4 votes Majority	Yazmin & James; Public vote	Bloodline; Public vote	F.A.I.T.H		
Eliminated	Ed Abdilla; Public vote Paul Anthony; 4 of 4 votes Majority	Jasmine Abela; Public vote Dav. Jr; 2 of 4 votes Deadlock	Karl Schembri; Public vote Celine Agius; 3 of 4 votes Majority	Yazmin & James; Public vote	Bloodline; Public vote	Kyle Cutajar		

=== Live show details ===
==== Week 1 (12 Jan) ====
- Theme: Born This Way

Contestants' performances on the first live show
Act	Order	Song	Result
Jasmine Abela	1	"Crazy in Love"	Safe
Kyle Cutajar	2	"Writing's on the Wall"	Safe
Yazmin & James	3	"Señorita"	Safe
Celine Agius	4	"It's a Man's Man's Man's World"	Bottom three
Justine Shorfid	5	"Always Remember Us This Way"	Safe
Ed Abdilla	6	"Devil's Robe" (Original song)	Eliminated
F.A.I.T.H	7	"That's My Girl"	Safe
Karl Schembri	8	"Smalltown Boy"	Safe
Dav. Jr	9	"Life is Good" (Original song)	Safe
Paul Anthony	10	"Feel"	Bottom three
Bloodline	11	"My Favorite Things"/"Lovely"	Safe
Destiny Chukunyere	12	"Higher Love"	Safe
Final showdown details
Act	Order	Song	Result
Celine Agius	1	"Valerie"	Safe
Paul Anthony	2	"Forget You"	Eliminated

Judges' vote to eliminate

- Alden: Paul Anthony
- Debono: Paul Anthony
- Mercieca: Paul Anthony
- Losco: Paul Anthony

==== Week 2 (19 Jan) ====
- Theme: Guilty Pleasures

Contestants' performances on the second live show
Act	Order	Song	Result
F.A.I.T.H	1	"Wannabe"	Safe
Celine Agius	2	"Sweet Dreams (Are Made of This)"	Safe
Jasmine Abela	3	"Material Girl"	Eliminated
Dav. Jr	4	"Umbrella"	Bottom three
Justine Shorfid	5	"Dance Monkey"	Safe
Bloodline	6	"Forever Young"	Safe
Yazmin & James	7	"(I've Had) The Time of My Life"	Bottom three
Kyle Cutajar	8	"Never Gonna Give You Up"	Safe
Destiny Chukunyere	9	"I Will Survive"	Safe
Karl Schembri	10	"I'll Fly with You"	Safe
Final showdown details
Act	Order	Song	Result
Yazmin & James	1	"Homesick"	Safe
Dav. Jr	2	"Your Song"	Eliminated

Judges' vote to eliminate

- Mercieca: Yazmin & James
- Debono: Dav. Jr
- Alden: Yazmin & James
- Losco: Dav. Jr

With the acts in the sing-off receiving two votes each, the result went to deadlock and reverted to the earlier public vote. Dav. Jr was eliminated as the act with the fewest public votes

==== Week 3 (26 Jan) ====
- Theme: Movie Spectacular

Contestants' performances on the third live show
Act	Order	Song	Movie	Result
Destiny Chukunyere	1	"He Lives in You"	The Lion King II: Simba's Pride	Safe
Celine Agius	2	"What a Wonderful World"	Good Morning, Vietnam	Bottom three
Yazmin & James	3	"You're the One That I Want"	Grease	Safe
Karl Schembri	4	"Nessun Dorma"	Turandot	Eliminated
Bloodline	5	"Swan Song"	Alita: Battle Angel	Bottom three
Justine Shorfid	6	"I Will Always Love You"	The Bodyguard	Safe
Kyle Cutajar	7	"Kiss from a Rose"	Batman Forever	Safe
F.A.I.T.H	8	"Man in the Mirror"	Man in the Mirror: The Michael Jackson Story	Safe
Final showdown details
Act	Order	Song		Result
Bloodline	1	"Lost on You"		Safe
Celine Agius	2	"I Put a Spell on You"		Eliminated

Judges' vote to eliminate

- Debono: Celine Agius
- Alden: Bloodline
- Losco: Celine Agius
- Mercieca: Celine Agius

==== Week 4 Semi-final (2 Feb) ====
- Theme: Big Band, Jukebox

Contestants' performances on the fourth live show
Act	Order	First Song	Result	Order	Second Song	Result
Bloodline	1	"Diamonds Are Forever"	Safe	10	"Euphoria"	Eliminated
Kyle Cutajar	2	"Feelin' Good"	Safe	7	"River"	Safe
Destiny Chukunyere	3	"And I Am Telling You I'm Not Going"	Safe	9	"This Is Me"	Safe
Yazmin & James	4	"Fever"	Eliminated	N/A (Already eliminated)		
F.A.I.T.H	5	"Candyman"	Safe	11	"Runnin' (Lose It All)"	Safe
Justine Shorfid	6	"(You Make Me Feel Like) A Natural Woman"	Safe	8	"Spirit"	Safe

==== Week 5: Final (8 Feb) ====
Contestants' performances on the fifth live show
Act	Order	First Song (original song)	Order	Second Song (guest duet)	Order	Third Song (Maltese classic song)	Order	Fourth Song (best moment song)	Result
Destiny Chukunyere	1	"Save the Hero"	5	"River Deep – Mountain High" (with Amelia Lily)	11	"Fejn Staħbejtli"	13	"He Lives in You"	Winner
F.A.I.T.H	2	"We Are F.A.I.T.H"	6	"Don't Start Now" (with Owen Leuellen)	9	"Viva Malta"	N/A (Already eliminated)		3rd Place
Justine Shorfid	3	"Bittersweet"	7	"Alone" (with Louisa Johnson)	10	"L-Aħħar Bidwi"	12	"All I Want"	Runner-Up
Kyle Cutajar	4	"Rise"	8	"Shallow" (with Michela Pace)	N/A (Already eliminated)				4th Place

== Season 3 ==
The third season premiered on 3 October 2021. This time around, the winner would not receive the rights to represent Malta at the Eurovision Song Contest 2022 in Italy.

=== Six Chair Challenge ===
The 24 successful acts were:

- Boys: Aidan Drakard, Ryan Hili, Kevin Paul, Nathan Psaila, Rheez, Isaac Tom
- Girls: Timea Farr, Lisa Gauci, Mariah Gerada, Kristy Spiteri, Hannah Theuma, Shauna Vassallo
- Overs: Janice Azzopardi, Cheryl Balzan, Dean Barton, Audrienne Fenech, Jastene Pacis, Jimmy Tyrrell
- Groups: Beyond, Ceci & Kriss, Daryl & Dale, Jasmine, Anna & Jana, Soul Tide, Wish Me Lack

=== Judges' Houses ===
The Judges' Houses episodes were broadcast on 19 December 2021 and 2 January 2022.

Summary of Judges' Houses
Judge	Category	Contestants eliminated
Debono	Boys	Nathan Psaila, Rheez, Isaac Tom
Grech	Girls	Mariah Gerada, Kristy Spiteri, Hannah Theuma
Losco	Overs	Janice Azzopardi, Dean Barton, Jastene Pacis
Naudi	Groups	Daryl & Dale, Jasmine, Anna & Jana, Wish Me Lack

=== Finalists ===
Key:

– Winner
– Runner-Up
– Third Place

Category (mentor)	Acts		
Boys (Debono)	Aidan Drakard	Ryan Hili	Kevin Paul
Girls (Grech)	Timea Farr	Lisa Gauci	Shauna Vassallo
Overs (Losco)	Cheryl Balzan	Audrienne Fenech	Jimmy Tyrrell
Groups (Naudi)	Beyond	Ceci & Kriss	Soul Tide

=== Live shows ===
The live shows began on Sunday, 16 January 2022. They were filmed at the Malta Fairs & Conventions Centre (MFCC) in Attard, Malta. Dance groups contracted for all live shows were The Unit Collective (Deedee Clark, Kimberly Lowell, Nicole Schembri), Southville Dancers (Christian Scerri), Kinetic Dance Academy (Clayton Mifsud, Daphne Gatt) and Annalise Dance Studio (Annalise Ellul).

=== Results summary ===
Colour key
– Contestant in the bottom three and had to perform in the Sing-Off
– Contestant was in the bottom three but received the fewest votes and was immediately eliminated
– Contestant received the fewest votes and was immediately eliminated

Contestant	Week 1	Week 2	Week 3	Week 4	Week 5	
Contestant	Week 1	Week 2	Week 3	Week 4	Round One	Round Two
Ryan Hili	Safe	Safe	Safe	Safe	Safe	Winner
Aidan Drakard	Safe	Safe	Safe	Safe	Safe	Runner-Up
Lisa Gauci	Safe	Safe	Safe	Safe	Safe	3rd Place
Cheryl Balzan	Safe	Safe	Safe	Safe	4th	Eliminated (week 5)
Ceci & Kriss	Safe	Safe	Safe	5th	Eliminated (week 4)	
Timea Farr	Safe	Bottom three	Bottom three	6th	Eliminated (week 4)	
Kevin Paul	Safe	Safe	Bottom three	Eliminated (week 3)		
Audrienne Fenech	Safe	Safe	8th	Eliminated (week 3)		
Soul Tide	Safe	Bottom three	Eliminated (week 2)			
Beyond	10th	10th	Eliminated (week 2)			
Jimmy Tyrrell	11th	Eliminated (week 1)				
Shauna Vassallo	12th	Eliminated (week 1)				
Sing-Off	Beyond, Jimmy Tyrrell	Soul Tide, Timea Farr	Kevin Paul, Timea Farr	No Sing Off or Judges Vote. The two acts with the fewest votes will leave the competition.	No Sing Off or Judges Vote, the public votes decide who wins.	
Debono's vote to eliminate	Beyond	Soul Tide	Timea Farr	No Sing Off or Judges Vote. The two acts with the fewest votes will leave the competition.	No Sing Off or Judges Vote, the public votes decide who wins.	
Grech's vote to eliminate	Jimmy Tyrrell	Soul Tide	Kevin Paul	No Sing Off or Judges Vote. The two acts with the fewest votes will leave the competition.	No Sing Off or Judges Vote, the public votes decide who wins.	
Losco's vote to eliminate	Beyond	Soul Tide	Kevin Paul	No Sing Off or Judges Vote. The two acts with the fewest votes will leave the competition.	No Sing Off or Judges Vote, the public votes decide who wins.	
Naudi's vote to eliminate	Jimmy Tyrrell	Timea Farr	Kevin Paul	No Sing Off or Judges Vote. The two acts with the fewest votes will leave the competition.	No Sing Off or Judges Vote, the public votes decide who wins.	
Eliminated	Shauna Vassallo; Public vote Jimmy Tyrrell; 2 of 4 votes Deadlock	Beyond; Public vote Soul Tide; 3 of 4 votes Majority	Audrienne Fenech; Public vote Kevin Paul; 3 of 4 votes Majority	Timea Farr; Public vote Ceci & Kriss; Public vote	Cheryl Balzan; Public vote	Ryan Hili; Winner
Eliminated	Shauna Vassallo; Public vote Jimmy Tyrrell; 2 of 4 votes Deadlock	Beyond; Public vote Soul Tide; 3 of 4 votes Majority	Audrienne Fenech; Public vote Kevin Paul; 3 of 4 votes Majority	Timea Farr; Public vote Ceci & Kriss; Public vote	Cheryl Balzan; Public vote	Aidan Drakard; Runner-up
Eliminated	Shauna Vassallo; Public vote Jimmy Tyrrell; 2 of 4 votes Deadlock	Beyond; Public vote Soul Tide; 3 of 4 votes Majority	Audrienne Fenech; Public vote Kevin Paul; 3 of 4 votes Majority	Timea Farr; Public vote Ceci & Kriss; Public vote	Cheryl Balzan; Public vote	Lisa Gauci; Third place

=== Live show details ===
==== Week 1 (16 Jan) ====
- Theme: It's My Life
- Group performance: "It's My Life"

Contestants' performances on the first live show
Act	Order	Song	Result
Ryan Hili	1	"Impossible"	Safe
Shauna Vassallo	2	"Blinding Lights"	Eliminated
Jimmy Tyrrell	3	"Dancing On My Own"	Bottom three
Beyond	4	"Love Runs Out"	Bottom three
Kevin Paul	5	"Hurt" (Original song)	Safe
Audrienne Fenech	6	"Ex's & Oh's"	Safe
Timea Farr	7	"Control"	Safe
Ceci & Kriss	8	"Higher Power"	Safe
Aidan Drakard	9	"Mercy"	Safe
Soul Tide	10	"Don't Go Yet"	Safe
Cheryl Balzan	11	"Just Like a Pill"	Safe
Lisa Gauci	12	"Run"	Safe
Final showdown details
Act	Order	Song	Result
Beyond	1	"I Just Called to Say I Love You"	Safe
Jimmy Tyrrell	2	"Purple Rain"	Eliminated

Judges' vote to eliminate

- Losco: Beyond
- Naudi: Jimmy Tyrrell
- Debono: Beyond
- Grech: Jimmy Tyrrell

With the acts in the sing-off receiving two votes each, the result went to deadlock and reverted to the earlier public vote. Jimmy Tyrrell was eliminated as the act with the fewest public votes.

==== Week 2 (23 Jan) ====
- Theme: Retro

Contestants' performances on the second live show
Act	Order	Song	Result
Cheryl Balzan	1	"The Best"	Safe
Timea Farr	2	"Iris"	Bottom three
Kevin Paul	3	"Right Here Waiting"	Safe
Beyond	4	"I'm Still Standing"	Eliminated
Soul Tide	5	"I Wanna Dance with Somebody (Who Loves Me)"	Bottom three
Lisa Gauci	6	"Believe"	Safe
Ceci & Kriss	7	"L-Aħħar Bidwi f’Wied il-Għasel"	Safe
Ryan Hili	8	"Against All Odds (Take a Look at Me Now)"	Safe
Audrienne Fenech	9	"Tainted Love"	Safe
Aidan Drakard	10	"Freedom! '90"	Safe
Final showdown details
Act	Order	Song	Result
Timea Farr	1	"The Night We Met"	Safe
Soul Tide	2	"I Will Survive"	Eliminated

Judges' vote to eliminate

- Naudi: Timea Farr
- Grech: Soul Tide
- Losco: Soul Tide
- Debono: Soul Tide

==== Week 3 (30 Jan) ====
- Theme: Soundtracks

Contestants' performances on the third live show
Act	Order	Song	Result
Kevin Paul	1	"My Life Is Going On"	Bottom three
Ceci & Kriss	2	"Let it Be"	Safe
Lisa Gauci	3	"Holding Out for a Hero"	Safe
Aidan Drakard	4	"Mad World"	Safe
Audrienne Fenech	5	"Friend Like Me"	Eliminated
Timea Farr	6	"Yellow"	Bottom three
Ryan Hili	7	"Somewhere Only We Know"	Safe
Cheryl Balzan	8	"(Everything I Do) I Do It for You"	Safe
Final showdown details
Act	Order	Song	Result
Timea Farr	1	"How Am I Supposed to Live Without You"	Safe
Kevin Paul	2	"If You're Not the One"	Eliminated

Judges' vote to eliminate

- Debono: Timea Farr
- Grech: Kevin Paul
- Naudi: Kevin Paul
- Losco: Kevin Paul

==== Week 4 (6 Feb) ====
- Theme: Greatest hits

Contestants' performances on the fourth live show
Act	Order	Song	
Ryan Hili	1	"Someone You Loved"	
Ceci & Kriss	2	"Royals"	
Lisa Gauci	3	"The Winner Takes It All"	
Aidan Drakard	4	"Let Me Entertain You"	
Timea Farr	5	"Easy on Me"	
Cheryl Balzan	6	"We Are the Champions"	
Sing-off showdown details
Act	Order	Song	Result
Lisa Gauci	1	"If I Were a Boy"	Safe
Cheryl Balzan	2	"Always"	Safe
Ceci & Kriss	3	"Drivers License"	Eliminated
Aidan Drakard	4	"Anyone"	Safe
Timea Farr	5	"Say Something"	Eliminated
Ryan Hili	6	"Human"	Safe

==== Week 5: Final (12 Feb) ====
Contestants' performances on the fifth live show
Act	Order	First Song	Order	Second Song (guest duet)	Order	Third Song (best moment song)	Result
Aidan Drakard	1	"Leave a Light On"	7	"Wicked Game" (with Michela Pace)	9	"Freedom! '90"	Runner-Up
Cheryl Balzan	2	"Here Comes the Rain Again"	8	"Beat It" (with Owen Leuellen)	N/A (Already eliminated)		4th Place
Lisa Gauci	3	"Purple Rain"	5	"Rumour Has It" (with Justine Shorfid)	10	"Run"	3rd Place
Ryan Hili	4	"Falling"	6	"Stay With Me" (with Nicole Frendo)	11	"Somewhere Only We Know"	Winner

== Season 4 ==
The fourth season premiered on 8 October 2023.

=== Six Chair Challenge ===
The 24 successful acts were:

- Boys: Mattia Adduocchio, Francesco Bonello, Kodin Camilleri, Aiden Cohen, Christian Grasso, Isaac Tom
- Girls: Marija Bellia, Mariah Fenech, Amelia Kalabic, Shanice Micallef, Kristy Spiteri, Eliza Stellini
- Overs: Richard Aquilina, Shenise Ghirxi, Sean Kamati, Cora Elizabeth Lewis, Rose Marielle Mamaclay, Joe Romano
- Groups: Freezap, Kelsie & Martina, Lapes & Nadine, Tonation, XO, Zoe & Kuba

=== Judges' Houses ===
The Judges' Houses episodes were broadcast on 24 and 31 December 2023.

Summary of Judges' Houses
Judge	Category	Contestants eliminated
Bondin	Boys	Francesco Bonello, Aiden Cohen, Christian Grasso
Bezzina	Girls	Marija Bellia, Mariah Fenech, Eliza Stellini
Debono	Overs	Shenise Ghirxi, Cora Elizabeth Lewis, Joe Romano
Losco	Groups	Freezap, Tonation, Zoe & Kuba

=== Finalists ===
Key:

– Winner
– Runner-Up
– Third Place

Category (mentor)	Acts		
Boys (Bondin)	Mattia Adduocchio	Kodin Camilleri	Isaac Tom
Girls (Bezzina)	Amelia Kalabic	Shanice Micallef	Kristy Spiteri
Overs (Debono)	Richard Aquilina	Sean Kamati	Rose Marielle Mamaclay
Groups (Losco)	Kelsie & Martina	Lapes & Nadine	XO

=== Live shows ===
The live shows began on Sunday, 14 January 2024. They were filmed at the Malta Fairs & Conventions Centre (MFCC) in Attard, Malta.

=== Results summary ===
Colour key
– Contestant in the bottom three and had to perform in the Sing-Off
– Contestant was in the bottom three but received the fewest votes and was immediately eliminated
– Contestant received the fewest votes and was immediately eliminated

Contestant	Week 1	Week 2	Week 3	Week 4	Week 5	
Contestant	Week 1	Week 2	Week 3	Week 4	Round One	Round Two
Richard Aquilina	Safe	Safe	Safe	Safe	Safe	Winner
Lapes u Nadine	Safe	Safe	Safe	Safe	Safe	Runner-up
Shanice Micallef	Safe	Safe	Safe	Safe	Safe	Third Place
Amelia Kalabic	Safe	Bottom three	Bottom three	Safe	4th	Eliminated (week 5)
Rose Marielle Mamaclay	Safe	Safe	Safe	5th	Eliminated (week 4)	
Sean Kamati	Bottom three	Safe	Safe	6th	Eliminated (week 4)	
XO	Safe	Safe	Bottom three	Eliminated (week 3)		
Isaac Tom	Safe	Safe	8th	Eliminated (week 3)		
Kodin Camilleri	Safe	Bottom three	Eliminated (week 2)			
Kelsie & Martina	Safe	10th	Eliminated (week 2)			
Kristy Spiteri	Bottom three	Eliminated (week 1)				
Mattia Adduocchio	12th	Eliminated (week 1)				
Sing-Off	Sean Kamati, Kristy Spiteri	Kodin Camilleri, Amelia Kalabic	XO, Amelia Kalabic	No Sing Off or Judges Vote. The two acts with the fewest votes will leave the competition.	No Sing Off or Judges Vote, the public votes decide who wins.	
Debono's vote to eliminate	Kristy Spiteri	Kodin Camilleri	XO	No Sing Off or Judges Vote. The two acts with the fewest votes will leave the competition.	No Sing Off or Judges Vote, the public votes decide who wins.	
Losco's vote to eliminate	Kristy Spiteri	Kodin Camilleri	Amelia Kalabic	No Sing Off or Judges Vote. The two acts with the fewest votes will leave the competition.	No Sing Off or Judges Vote, the public votes decide who wins.	
Bondin's vote to eliminate	Kristy Spiteri	Amelia Kalabic	XO	No Sing Off or Judges Vote. The two acts with the fewest votes will leave the competition.	No Sing Off or Judges Vote, the public votes decide who wins.	
Bezzina's vote to eliminate	Sean Kamati	Kodin Camilleri	XO	No Sing Off or Judges Vote. The two acts with the fewest votes will leave the competition.	No Sing Off or Judges Vote, the public votes decide who wins.	
Eliminated	Mattia Adduocchio; Public vote Kristy Spiteri; 3 of 4 votes Majority	Kelsie & Martina; Public vote Kodin Camilleri; 3 of 4 votes Majority	Isaac Tom; Public vote XO; 3 of 4 votes Majority	Sean Kamati; Public vote Rose Marielle Mamaclay; Public vote	Amelia Kalabic; Public vote	Richard Aquilina; Winner
Eliminated	Mattia Adduocchio; Public vote Kristy Spiteri; 3 of 4 votes Majority	Kelsie & Martina; Public vote Kodin Camilleri; 3 of 4 votes Majority	Isaac Tom; Public vote XO; 3 of 4 votes Majority	Sean Kamati; Public vote Rose Marielle Mamaclay; Public vote	Amelia Kalabic; Public vote	Lapes u Nadine; Runner-up
Eliminated	Mattia Adduocchio; Public vote Kristy Spiteri; 3 of 4 votes Majority	Kelsie & Martina; Public vote Kodin Camilleri; 3 of 4 votes Majority	Isaac Tom; Public vote XO; 3 of 4 votes Majority	Sean Kamati; Public vote Rose Marielle Mamaclay; Public vote	Amelia Kalabic; Public vote	Shanice Micallef; Third place

=== Live show details ===
==== Week 1 (14 Jan) ====
- Group performance: "Praising You"
- Theme: This is Me

Contestants' performances on the first live show
Act	Order	Song	Result
Shanice Micallef	1	"Jealous"	Safe
Sean Kamati	2	"Lay Me Down"	Bottom three
XO	3	"New Rules"	Safe
Isaac Tom	4	"Arcade"	Safe
Amelia Kalabic	5	"Savage Love (Laxed – Siren Beat)"	Safe
Kelsie & Martina	6	"Alive"	Safe
Richard Aquilina	7	"In the Stars"	Safe
Kodin Camilleri	8	"Roadhouse Blues"	Safe
Kristy Spiteri	9	"Déjà Vu"	Bottom three
Rose Marielle Mamaclay	10	"Who You Are"	Safe
Mattia Adduocchio	11	"Feeling Good"	Eliminated
Lapes & Nadine	12	Original song	Safe
Final showdown details
Act	Order	Song	Result
Sean Kamati	1	"Purple Rain"	Safe
Kristy Spiteri	2	"How Am I Supposed to Live Without You"	Eliminated

Judges' vote to eliminate

- Debono: Kristy Spiteri
- Bezzina: Sean Kamati
- Losco: Kristy Spiteri
- Bondin: Kristy Spiteri

==== Week 2 (21 Jan) ====
- Theme: Number 1 Hits

Contestants' performances on the second live show
Act	Order	Song	Result
Amelia Kalabic	1	"Nothing Compares 2 U"	Bottom three
Rose Marielle Mamaclay	2	"What About Us"	Safe
Isaac Tom	3	"Save Your Tears"	Safe
Kelsie & Martina	4	"Ain't No Mountain High Enough"	Eliminated
Sean Kamati	5	"It's a Man's Man's Man's World"	Safe
Kodin Camilleri	6	"Uptown Funk"	Bottom three
Lapes & Nadine	7	"Love the Way You Lie" (Maltese)	Safe
Shanice Micallef	8	"Bridge over Troubled Water"	Safe
XO	9	"Jolene"	Safe
Richard Aquilina	10	"Shivers"	Safe
Final showdown details
Act	Order	Song	Result
Kodin Camilleri	1	"California Dreamin'"	Eliminated
Amelia Kalabic	2	"Killing Me Softly with His Song"	Safe

Judges' vote to eliminate

- Bondin: Amelia Kalabic
- Bezzina: Kodin Camilleri
- Losco: Kodin Camilleri
- Debono: Kodin Camilleri

==== Week 3 (28 Jan) ====
- Theme: Throwbacks

Contestants' performances on the third live show
Act	Order	Song	Result
XO	1	"Man! I Feel Like a Woman!"	Bottom three
Amelia Kalabic	2	"Bohemian Rhapsody"	Bottom three
Sean Kamati	3	"Don't Stop Believin'"	Safe
Lapes & Nadine	4	"Read All About It" (Maltese)	Safe
Rose Marielle Mamaclay	5	"I Have Nothing"	Safe
Shanice Micallef	6	"Yesterday"	Safe
Richard Aquillina	7	"Angels"	Safe
Issac Tom	8	"It's a Sin"	Eliminated
Final showdown details
Act	Order	Song	Result
XO	1	"Drivers License"	Eliminated
Amelia Kalabic	2	"I See Red"	Safe

Judges' vote to eliminate

- Losco: Amelia Kalabic
- Bezzina: XO
- Debono: XO
- Bondin: XO

==== Week 4 (Semi-Finals) (4 Feb) ====
- Theme: Movies

Contestants' performances on the fourth live show
Act	Order	Song	Film	Result
Rose Marielle Mamaclay	1	"Never Enough	The Greatest Showman	Safe
Amelia Kalabic	2	"No Time to Die"	No Time to Die	Safe
Richard Aquilina	3	"A Thousand Years"	The Twilight Saga: Breaking Dawn – Part 1	Safe
Sean Kamati	4	"Kiss from a Rose"	Batman Forever	Eliminated
Lapes & Nadine	5	"Now We Are Free"	Gladiator	Safe
Shanice Micallef	6	"What Was I Made For?"	Barbie	Safe
Final showdown details
Act	Order	Song	Result	
Lapes & Nadine	1	"Lose Yourself (Maltese)"	Safe	
Richard Aquilina	2	"Don't Give Up on Me"	Safe	
Shanice Micallef	3	"Vampire"	Safe	
Amelia Kalabic	4	"Cutting Ties (Original)"	Safe	
Rose Marielle Mamaclay	5	"Bang Bang"	Eliminated	

==== Week 5: Final (11 Feb) ====
Contestants' performances on the fifth live show
Act	Order	First Song	Order	Second Song (guest duet)	Order	Third Song (best moment song)	Result
Amelia Kalabic	1	"Running in Circles (Original)"	5	"You Don't Own Me" (with Owen Leuellen)	N/A (Already eliminated)		4th Place
Richard Aquilina	2	"Half a Man"	6	"Broken Strings" (with Lisa Gauci)	9	"In the Stars"	Winner
Shanice Micallef	3	"As the World Caves In"	7	"Sabiħa" (with Gianluca Bezzina)	10	"Jealous"	3rd Place
Lapes & Nadine	4	"Ġo Gaġġa Kollha Lwien (Original Maltese)"	8	"Cannonball" (with Ira Losco)	11	"Now We Are Free"	Runner Up

== Season 5 ==
The fifth season premiered on 11 January 2026 with a 'Back to Win' format, meaning singers from the previous seasons return to go head to head to win this contest.

=== Auditions ===
Auditions for The X Factor Malta Season 5 were held on 11 January and 18 January 2026. The judging panel consisted of Amber Bondin, Howard Keith Debono, Philippa Naudi, and Aleandro Spiteri Monsigneur. A total of 23 acts, all of whom were former contestants of the competition, returned to audition. Each act performed in front of the judges, who evaluated the performances and delivered a “yes” or “no” vote.

Acts that received four “yes” votes automatically advanced to the live shows. Contestants who received two or fewer “yes” votes were eliminated from the competition. Acts that received three “yes” votes were placed under further deliberation, after which the judges selected two additional acts to complete the lineup. In total, 12 acts advanced to the live shows.

Colour key
– Received a unanimous “yes” from all four judges and automatically advanced to the live shows
– Received three “yes” votes and was later selected by the judges during deliberation to advance
– Received three “yes” votes but was not selected to advance after deliberation
– Received two or fewer “yes” votes and was immediately eliminated

Auditions Results
Contestants	Audition Result
Lisa Gauci	Passed
Audrienne Fenech	Failed To Pass
Ben Purplee	Failed To Pass
Miguel Bonello	Passed
Shaunna Vassallo	Passed
Brady Ferndo	Failed To Pass
Amelia Kalabic	Passed
Kyle George	Passed
Nathan Psaila	Failed To Pass
Rose Marielle Mamaclay	Passed
Bloodeline	Passed
Maya Sesay	Passed
Lapes & Nadine	Passed
Cora Elizabeth Lewis	Failed To Pass
Jasmine Abela	Passed
Timea Farr	Failed To Pass
Shanice Micallef	Passed
Shenise Ghirxi	Failed To Pass
Jimmy Tyrrell	Failed To Pass
Carly Buttigieg	Failed To Pass
Dav. Jr	Failed To Pass
Kersten Graham	Failed To Pass
Owen Luellen	Passed

=== Finalists ===
Key:

– Winner
– Runner-up
– Third place
– Fourth place

Mentor	Acts		
Amber Bondin	Owen Leuellen	Mamaclay	Kyle George
Howard Keith Debono	Miguel Bonello	Amelia Kalabic	Lapes & Nadine
Philippa Naudi	Bloodline	Lisa Gauci	Maya Sesay
Aleandro Spiteri Monsigneur	Jasmine Abela	Shanice Micallef	Shauna Vassallo

=== Live shows ===
The live shows began on Sunday, 25 January 2026. They were filmed at the Malta Fairs & Conventions Centre (MFCC) in Attard, Malta.

=== Results summary ===
Colour key
– Contestant in the bottom two and had to perform in the Sing-Off
– Contestant in the bottom three and had to perform in the Sing-Off
– Contestant was in the bottom three but received the fewest votes and was immediately eliminated
– Contestant received the fewest votes and was immediately eliminated
– All Contestants had to perform in the Super Sing-Off

Contestant	Week 1	Week 2	Week 3	Week 4	Week 5		Week 6
Contestant	Week 1	Week 2	Week 3	Week 4	Round One	Round Two	Week 6
Lisa Gauci	Safe	Safe	Safe	Safe	Safe	Safe	Winner
Miguel Bonello	Safe	Safe	Safe	6th	Safe	Safe	Runner-Up
Jasmine Abela	Safe	Safe	Bottom two	Safe	Safe	Safe	Third Place
Amelia Kalabic	Safe	Safe	Safe	Safe	Safe	Safe	Fourth Place
Lapes & Nadine	Safe	Safe	Safe	Safe	Safe	5th	Eliminated (week 5)
Shanice Micallef	Safe	Safe	Safe	Safe	6th	Eliminated (week 5)	
Owen Leuellen	Safe	Safe	Safe	7th	Eliminated (week 4)		
Kyle George	Safe	8th	Bottom two	Eliminated (week 3)			
Bloodline	Safe	9th	Eliminated (week 2)				
Shauna Vassallo	Bottom three	10th	Eliminated (week 2)				
Maya Sesay	Bottom three	Eliminated (week 1)					
Mamaclay	12th	Eliminated (week 1)					
Sing-Off	Maya Sesay, Shauna Vassallo	Bloodline, Kyle George	Kyle George, Jasmine Abela	Owen Leullen, Miguel Bonello	No Sing Off or Judges Vote. The act with the fewest votes will leave the competition.	All Remaining Contestants	No Sing Off or Judges Vote, the public votes decide who wins.
Bondin's vote to eliminate	Maya Sesay	Bloodline	Jasmine Abela	Miguel Bonello	No Sing Off or Judges Vote. The act with the fewest votes will leave the competition.	No Judges Vote. The act with the fewest public votes will leave the competition.	No Sing Off or Judges Vote, the public votes decide who wins.
Debono's vote to eliminate	Maya Sesay	Kyle George	Kyle George	Owen Leuellen	No Sing Off or Judges Vote. The act with the fewest votes will leave the competition.	No Judges Vote. The act with the fewest public votes will leave the competition.	No Sing Off or Judges Vote, the public votes decide who wins.
Naudi's vote to eliminate	Shauna Vassallo	Kyle George	Kyle George	Owen Leuellen	No Sing Off or Judges Vote. The act with the fewest votes will leave the competition.	No Judges Vote. The act with the fewest public votes will leave the competition.	No Sing Off or Judges Vote, the public votes decide who wins.
Spiteri's vote to eliminate	Maya Sesay	Bloodline	Kyle George	Miguel Bonello	No Sing Off or Judges Vote. The act with the fewest votes will leave the competition.	No Judges Vote. The act with the fewest public votes will leave the competition.	No Sing Off or Judges Vote, the public votes decide who wins.
Eliminated	Mamaclay; Public vote Maya Sesay; 3 of 4 votes Majority	Shauna Vassallo; Public vote Bloodline; 2 of 4 votes Deadlock	Kyle George; 3 of 4 votes Majority	Owen Leuellen; 2 of 4 votes Deadlock	Shanice Micallef; Public vote	Lapes & Nadine; Public vote	Lisa Gauci
Eliminated	Mamaclay; Public vote Maya Sesay; 3 of 4 votes Majority	Shauna Vassallo; Public vote Bloodline; 2 of 4 votes Deadlock	Kyle George; 3 of 4 votes Majority	Owen Leuellen; 2 of 4 votes Deadlock	Shanice Micallef; Public vote	Lapes & Nadine; Public vote	Miguel Bonello
Eliminated	Mamaclay; Public vote Maya Sesay; 3 of 4 votes Majority	Shauna Vassallo; Public vote Bloodline; 2 of 4 votes Deadlock	Kyle George; 3 of 4 votes Majority	Owen Leuellen; 2 of 4 votes Deadlock	Shanice Micallef; Public vote	Lapes & Nadine; Public vote	Jasmine Abela
Eliminated	Mamaclay; Public vote Maya Sesay; 3 of 4 votes Majority	Shauna Vassallo; Public vote Bloodline; 2 of 4 votes Deadlock	Kyle George; 3 of 4 votes Majority	Owen Leuellen; 2 of 4 votes Deadlock	Shanice Micallef; Public vote	Lapes & Nadine; Public vote	Amelia Kalabic

==== Week 1 (25 Jan) ====
- Theme: Show Yourself

Contestants' performances on the first live show
Act	Order	Song	Result
Amelia Kalabic	1	"Vampire"	Safe
Jasmine Abela	2	"Where Is My Husband!"	Safe
Maya Sesay	3	"Kill Bill"	Bottom three
Owen Leuellen	4	"Industry Baby"	Safe
Shanice Micallef	5	"All I Want"	Safe
Rose Marielle Mamaclay	6	"Alive"	Eliminated
Miguel Bonello	7	"Golden Hour"	Safe
Bloodline	8	"Good Luck, Babe!"	Safe
Kyle George	9	"Unholy"	Safe
Shauna Vassallo	10	"Bring Me to Life"	Bottom three
Lisa Gauci	11	"Dangerous Woman"	Safe
Lapes u Nadine	12	"Ma Nafekx Sew"	Safe
Final showdown details
Act	Order	Song	Result
Maya Sesay	1	"I Can't Make You Love Me"	Eliminated
Shauna Vassallo	2	"Paparazzi"	Safe

==== Week 2 (1 Feb) ====
- Theme: Retro

Contestants' performances on the second live show
Act	Order	Song	Result
Lisa Gauci	1	"I Say a Little Prayer"	Safe
Jasmine Abela	2	"I Wanna Dance with Somebody (Who Loves Me)"	Safe
Owen Leuellen	3	"Many Men (Wish Death)"	Safe
Miguel Bonello	4	"Maneater"	Safe
Bloodline	5	"With or Without You"	Bottom three
Amelia Kalabic	6	"Heart of Glass"	Safe
Shauna Vassallo	7	"I Was Made for Lovin' You"	Eliminated
Lapes u Nadine	8	"Iljieli Sħaħ"	Safe
Kyle George	9	"It's My Life"	Bottom three
Shanice Micallef	10	"Billie Jean"	Safe
Final showdown details
Act	Order	Song	Result
Bloodline	1	"Fix You"	Eliminated
Kyle George	2	"Anyone"	Safe

==== Week 3 (8 Feb) ====
- Theme: Soundtracks

Contestants' performances on the third live show
Act	Order	Song	Result
Jasmine Abela	1	"Over the Rainbow"	Bottom two
Amelia Kalabic	2	"She Used to Be Mine"	Safe
Miguel Bonello	3	"Youngblood"	Safe
Shanice Micallef	4	"It Must Have Been Love"	Safe
Lapes u Nadine	5	"Jien Tliftek"	Safe
Lisa Gauci	6	"Dream On"	Safe
Kyle George	7	"You'll Be in My Heart"	Bottom two
Owen Leuellen	8	"Without Me"	Safe
Final showdown details
Act	Order	Song	Result
Kyle George	1	"Dancing on My Own"	Eliminated
Jasmine Abela	2	"If I Ain't Got You"	Safe

==== Week 4 (15 Feb) ====
- Theme: Viral Hits

Contestants' performances on the fourth live show
Act	Order	Song	Result
Miguel Bonello	1	"Sign of the Times"	Bottom two
Owen Leuellen	2	"Not Like Us"	Bottom two
Shanice Micallef	3	"Arcade"	Safe
Jasmine Abela	4	"Pink Pony Club"	Safe
Lapes u Nadine	5	"Oceans"	Safe
Amelia Kalabic	6	"I Love You, I'm Sorry"	Safe
Lisa Gauci	7	"Beautiful Things"	Safe
Final showdown details
Act	Order	Song	Result
Owen Leuellen	1	?	Eliminated
Miguel Bonello	2	"The Village"	Safe

==== Week 5: Semi-Final (18 Feb) ====
- Theme: Orchestral

Contestants' performances on the fifth live show
Act	Order	Song	Result
Shanice Micallef	1	"Birds of a Feather"	Eliminated
Amelia Kalabic	2	"Creep"	Advanced to Super Sing-Off
Lapes u Nadine	3	"Nerġa' Nqum"	Advanced to Super Sing-Off
Lisa Gauci	4	"Die with a Smile"	Advanced to Super Sing-Off
Jasmine Abela	5	"Training Season"	Advanced to Super Sing-Off
Miguel Bonello	6	"The Night We Met"	Advanced to Super Sing-Off
Super Sing-Off (Round 5.5)
Act	Order	Song	Result
Jasmine Abela	1	"When We Were Young"	Safe
Lapes u Nadine	2	"Id-Dinja Tibqa' Ddur" (original song)	Eliminated
Lisa Gauci	3	"Lonely"	Safe
Miguel Bonello	4	"Ceilings"	Safe
Amelia Kalabic	5	"The House of the Rising Sun"	Safe

==== Week 6: Final (21 Feb) ====
- Round 1: Free Pick
- Round 2: Guest duet
- Round 3: Favourite performance from Weeks 1–5

Contestants' performances on the sixth live show
Act	Order	First song (new song)	Order	Second song (guest duet)	Order	Third song (best performance)	Result
Amelia Kalabic	1	"Blank" (original song)	5	"A Thousand Years" (with Richard Aquilina)	9	"Vampire"	4th place
Jasmine Abela	2	"Crazy in Love"	6	"He Lives in You" (with Destiny Chukunyere)	10	"Somewhere Over the Rainbow"	3rd place
Lisa Gauci	3	"All I Ask"	7	"Falling" (with Ryan Hili)	11	"Dream On"	Winner
Miguel Bonello	4	"Ordinary"	8	"Shallow" (with Michela Pace)	12	"Golden Hour"	Runner-up
