= Asterisks (festival) =

Festival in the Republic of North Macedonia

"Asterisks" is an international children's festival in the Republic of North Macedonia. It takes place in October every year in the town of Prilep. It is organized by Estrada Multimedia Center.

The festival strives to produce children's hits and to make the participant children new little stars.

North Macedonia

Prilep, Republic of North Macedonia

The main intention of the festival is to create strong friendship bonds between the children from different ethnic and religious backgrounds and to practice the principles of collective living, interpersonal tolerance and understanding, as well as overcoming the cultural differences between the children from all over the world.

The festival is intended to be a big show for children from all over the world where they have the opportunity to show their capabilities, sing their children's songs and have fun. The festival days are a real holiday for the children because everything on this festival is prearranged especially for them.
