= All of My Love (Destiny song) =

2020 song by Destiny Chukunyere

Single by Destiny
- Released: 9 March 2020
- Genre: Soul-pop
- Length: 3:00
- Songwriters: Bernarda Brunović; Borislav Milanov; Sebastian Arman; Dag Lundberg; Joacim Persson

Destiny singles chronology
"Fast Life (Ladidadi)" (2016)	"All of My Love" (2020)	"Je me casse" (2021)

Music video
- All of My Love on YouTube

Eurovision Song Contest 2020 entry
- Country: Malta
- Artist: Destiny Chukunyere
- As: Destiny
- Language: English
- Composers: Bernarda Brunović; Borislav Milanov; Sebastian Arman; Dag Lundberg; Joacim Persson; Cesár Sampson
- Lyricists: Bernarda Brunović; Borislav Milanov; Sebastian Arman; Dag Lundberg; Joacim Persson

Finals performance
- Semi-final result: Contest cancelled

Entry chronology
- ◄ "Chameleon" (2019)
- "Je me casse" (2021) ►

"All of My Love" is a song recorded by Maltese singer Destiny Chukunyere. The song was planned to represent Malta in the Eurovision Song Contest 2020 in Rotterdam. However, the contest was cancelled because of the COVID-19 pandemic. The song was written by Bernarda Brunović, Borislav Milanov, Sebastian Arman, Dag Lundberg and Joacim Persson.

The song was originally aimed for Bulgarian singer Poli Genova, who instead chose to release "If Love Was a Crime" as Bulgaria's 2016 Eurovision entry, as revealed in an Instagram conversation with 2013 Finland entry Krista Siegfrids, who she was alongside in the Finnish selection process in March 2020. Another of the song's writers, Bernarda Brunovic, admitted that she submitted the song to the Croatian selection process but, after it was rejected, was given to Destiny. 2018 Austrian Eurovision entrant Cesar Sampson, a close friend of Milanov, was also a composer of the song.

== Critical reception ==
The song earned acclaim from fansites. On the website Wiwibloggs, the song got an average of 8.1/10 (a minimum of 6.5 and a maximum of 9.5), the second highest behind the German entry, also written by Milanov. One member of the panel stated "'All of My Love' is a very strong effort from Malta. Channeling from gospel R&B, Destiny takes you on a journey that is both interesting and ticks all the boxes for a standout Eurovision act. A powerful vocal with enough personality to make the track unique paired with one of the best productions of the year. Also, it had room to grow live. A strong contender for the victory.", whilst other members of the 22 member panel compared it to songs by Lizzo and Sigala.

On another fansite, ESCXtra, it was ranked 6th out of the 41 songs with 156 points (2 gave it the maximum 12, but one gave it a low of 2) from the 19 reviewers. Reviewer praises included that "All the big touchpoints are here: vocals, song quality, authenticity, and a strong reason to vote.", and "We know that Destiny has the pipes to sing any you song you giver to her. ‘All of My Love’ did not disappoint and was the appropriate choice for the contest. The song suits her voice and I cannot wait to hear Destiny sing this song live, whenever that may be.", though some critics felt that the song was dated.

Metro online columnist Emma Kelly described the song as "All of My Love by Destiny is Emeli Sande does Eurovision. [...] Destiny’s diva attitude and strong vocals make this track a bit more special sum of its parts, and as we all know, Eurovision voters love a diva. Plus, the video is very prescient with all of those face masks.", giving it 7.4 out of 10.

The song also fared well in alternative programming to replace Eurovision in various countries. Austria's ORF aired Der kleine Song Contest in April 2020, which saw every entry being assigned to one of three semi-finals. A jury consisting of ten singers that had represented Austria at Eurovision before, including Sampson, was hired to rank each song; the best-placed in each semi-final advanced to the final round. In the second semi-final on 14 April, "All of My Love" won in a field of 14 participants, achieving 97 points, with every juror giving it at least 8. In the final show involving the 3 heat winners, the song placed 3rd with 19% of the votes.

The song also fared well in Norddeutscher Rundfunk's Eurovision 2020 – das deutsche Finale, where it placed 4th, and Sveriges Television's Sveriges 12:a on 14 May, placing second to Iceland in both lists.

== Music video ==
The music video was released with the song on 9 March, running at 3 minutes and 48 seconds, and with over 2.2 million views as of 7 June 2020. It begins with a narrated part, "Free spirit. Live like there’s no tomorrow. Run wild. Fulfil your destiny", a reference to her name. It features a varied range of surroundings, including dancers engaging in Parkour and Freediving. In a poll on the website Wiwibloggs, fans named it as their favourite music video.

== Eurovision Song contest ==
In the Eurovision Song Celebration YouTube stream in place of Semi Final 1, it was revealed the song would have performed 10th, between Belgium's entry and Croatia's.
