= Chameleon (Michela Pace song) =

2019 song by Michela Pace

Single by Michela Pace
- Released: 4 April 2019
- Genre: Pop
- Length: 2:59
- Label: Spinnup
- Songwriters: Joacim Persson; Paula Winger; Borislav Milanov; Johan Alkenäs

Michela Pace singles chronology
"Chameleon" (2019)	"Cannonball" (2019)

Music video
- "Chameleon" on YouTube

Eurovision Song Contest 2019 entry
- Country: Malta
- Artist: Michela Pace
- Language: English
- Composers: Joacim Persson; Paula Winger; Borislav Milanov; Johan Alkenäs
- Lyricists: Joacim Persson; Paula Winger; Borislav Milanov; Johan Alkenäs

Finals performance
- Semi-final result: 8th
- Semi-final points: 157
- Final result: 14th
- Final points: 107

Entry chronology
- ◄ "Taboo" (2018)
- "All of My Love" (2020) ►

"Chameleon" is a song by Maltese singer Michela Pace. It was selected by PBS (Malta) to represent Malta at the Eurovision Song Contest 2019 in Tel Aviv, Israel. The song was revealed on 10 March 2019, along with the music video, while its official release was on 4 April 2019. The singer was selected to represent her country at the 2019 Eurovision Song Contest through winning the first edition of X Factor Malta. This song was assigned to the singer after that TV show had ended. It was performed during the second semi-final on 16 May 2019, and qualified for the final, where it placed 14th with a total of 107 points.

== Reception ==
By 29 March, "Chameleon" had achieved more than four million views on the official YouTube channel of the contest. It peaked at number 1 in its debut in the Malta's Top 10 charts show held every week by Bay 89.7 radio station. The song has received positive reviews from Eurovision journalists. William Lee Adams of Wiwibloggs made a reaction video saying that the song "is daring" and "full of quality", while Natalie Feliks described it "strong" and "colorful" with an "infectious quality". Owner of ESCtips wrote about "Chameleon" that it is the "most original" among the upbeat pop songs of the 2019 contest.

== Eurovision Song Contest ==
Michela Pace won the first Maltese version of The X Factor on 26 January 2019 and therefore got the right to represent Malta in the Eurovision Song Contest 2019, in Tel Aviv. On 10 March, her song "Chameleon", written and composed by Joacim Persson, Paula Winger, Borislav Milanov and Johan Alkanas, was revealed on the Eurovision Song Contest's official YouTube channel along with its music video. The commercial release of the song was on 4 April. The music video of "Chameleon" was produced and directed by a team from the Maltese national broadcaster PBS, with popular freelance steadicam operator and videographer Charles Ahar at the head of the team.

On 28 January 2019, a special allocation draw was held which placed each country into one of the two semi-finals, as well as which half of the show they would perform in. Malta was placed into the second semi-final, to be held on 16 May 2019, and was scheduled to perform in the second half of the show.

Once all the competing songs for the 2019 contest had been released, the running order for the semi-finals was decided by the shows' producers rather than through another draw, so that similar songs were not placed next to each other. Malta was set to perform in position 11, following the entry from Croatia and preceding the entry from Lithuania.

The song qualified to the final from the second semi-final where it was announced as the last qualifying entry (the songs were announced in a random order).

== Charts ==
2019 weekly chart performance
Chart (2019)	Peak position
Belgium (Ultratip Bubbling Under Flanders)	59
Estonia (Eesti Tipp-40)	29
Greece International (IFPI)	65
Iceland (Tónlistinn)	38
Lithuania (AGATA)	23
Netherlands (Single Top 100)	73
Scottish Singles Sales (Official Charts)	86
Sweden (Sverigetopplistan)	69

2026 weekly chart performance
Chart (2026)	Peak position
Malta Domestic Airplay (BMAT PRS)	7
